= 2020 Pennsylvania House of Representatives election =

- November 3, 2020

All 203 seats in the Pennsylvania House of Representatives 102 seats needed for a majority
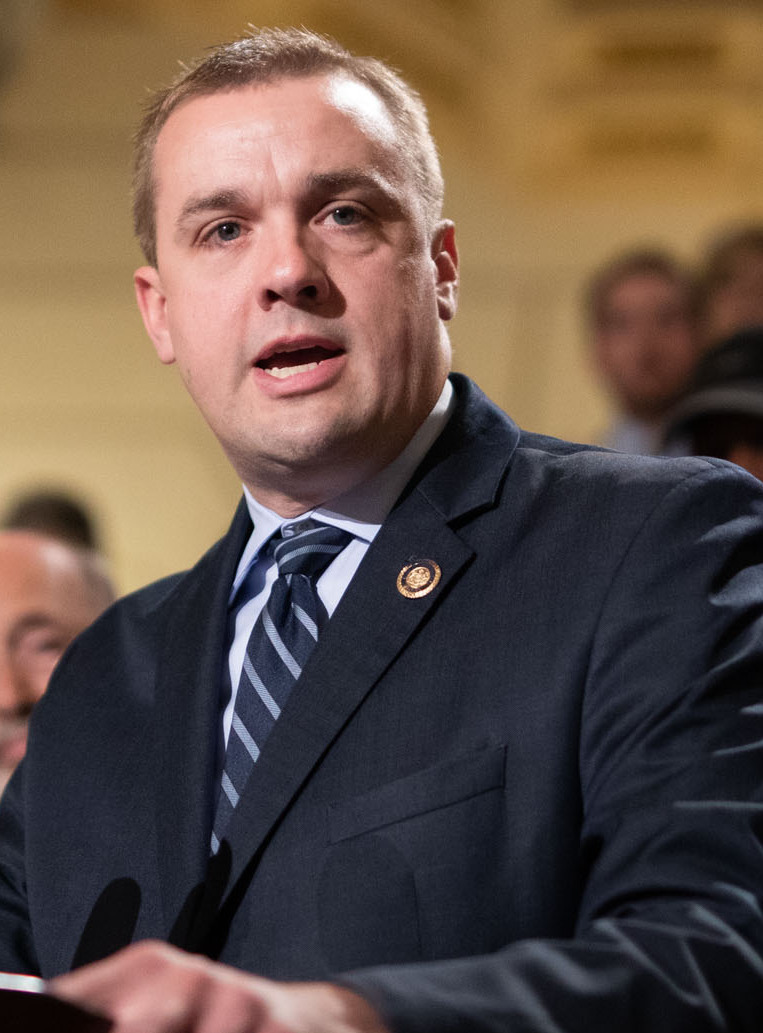

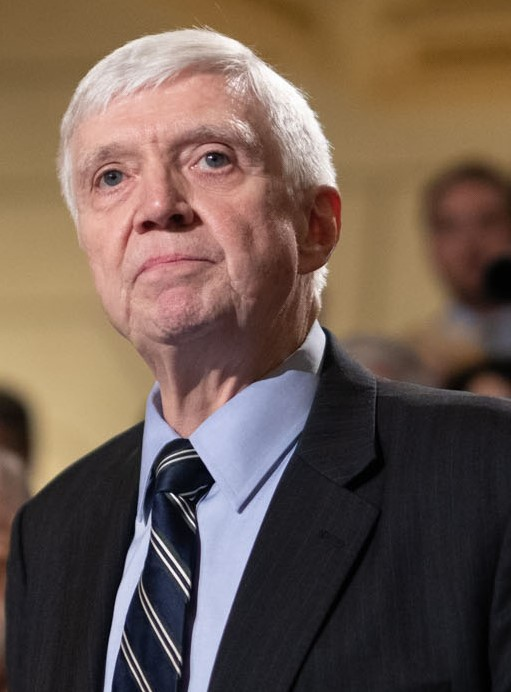
	Majority party	Minority party
Leader	Bryan Cutler	Frank Dermody (lost re-election)
Party	Republican	Democratic
Leader since	June 22, 2020	January 4, 2011
Leader's seat	100th	33rd
Last election	110	93
Seats won	113	90
Seat change	▲3	▼3
Popular vote	3,416,942	3,017,689
Percentage	52.73%	46.57%
Swing	▲8.30%	▼8.43%
- Results: Republican hold Republican gain Democratic hold Democratic gain
Speaker before election
Bryan Cutler
(replacing Mike Turzai)
Republican
Elected Speaker
Bryan Cutler
Republican

The 2020 elections for the Pennsylvania House of Representatives was held on November 3, 2020, with all districts being decided. The term of office for those that were elected in 2020 began when the House of Representatives convened in January 2021. Pennsylvania State Representatives were elected for two-year terms, with all 203 seats up for election every two years. The election was coincided with the 2020 United States presidential election, United States House of Representatives elections, and one-half of the State Senate.

At the time of this election, Republicans had controlled the chamber since 2010. In October 2020, The Washington Post identified this state election as one of eight whose outcomes could affect partisan balance during post-census redistricting.

== Special elections ==
=== 8th legislative district ===
In the 2019 elections, Republican state representative Tedd Nesbit was elected to be a judge on the Mercer County Court of Common Pleas. A special election for the 8th legislative district was held on March 17 to fill his seat.

Democrats selected business owner Phil Heasley as their nominee, while Republicans nominated attorney Timothy R. Bonner. Bonner won the special election in the heavily Republican district.

District 8 special election
Party	Candidate	Votes	%
Republican	Timothy R. Bonner	4,000	75.08
Democratic	Phil Heasley	1,328	24.92
Total votes		5,328	100.00
Republican hold			

=== 18th legislative district ===
In the 2019 elections, Republican state representative Gene DiGirolamo was elected to be a Bucks County commissioner. A special election for the 18th legislative district was held on March 17 to fill his seat.

Democrats selected union plumber Harold Hayes as their nominee. Republicans nominated Kathleen "KC" Tomlinson, a funeral director and daughter of State Senator Tommy Tomlinson. Both candidates also ran for their respective party's nomination for the general election.

After arguments by Democrats over holding this election during the COVID-19 pandemic, Tomlinson won the special election.

District 18 special election
Party	Candidate	Votes	%
Republican	Kathleen C. Tomlinson	4,516	55.23
Democratic	Harold Hayes	3,661	44.77
Total votes		8,177	100.00
Republican hold			

=== 58th legislative district ===
In the 2019 elections, Republican state representative Justin Walsh was elected to be a judge on the Westmoreland County Court of Common Pleas. A special election for the 58th legislative district was held on March 17 to fill his seat.

Democrats selected former Smithton mayor Robert Prah Jr. as their nominee, while Republicans nominated union carpenter Eric Davanzo. Both candidates also ran for their respective party's nomination for the general election. Davanzo won the special election.

District 58 special election
Party	Candidate	Votes	%
Republican	Eric Davanzo	4,269	52.58
Democratic	Robert Prah Jr.	3,294	40.57
Libertarian	Kenneth Bach	556	6.85
Total votes		8,119	100.00
Republican hold			

=== 190th legislative district ===
Democratic state representative Movita Johnson-Harrell, elected to the seat in a 2019 special election, resigned her seat less than a year after being charged with stealing from her own charity. A special election for the 190th legislative district was held on February 25 to fill Johnson-Harrell's vacancy.

Democrats selected local SEIU business agent G. Roni Green as their nominee, and Republicans nominated businesswoman Wanda Logan. Green easily won this heavily Democratic district.

District 190 special election
Party	Candidate	Votes	%
Democratic	G. Roni Green	2,651	86.27
Republican	Wanda Logan	422	13.73
Total votes		3,073	100.00
Democratic hold			

== Predictions ==
Source	Ranking	As of
The Cook Political Report	Tossup	October 21, 2020

== General election results overview ==
Affiliation	Candidates	Votes	Vote %	Seats won
Republican	168	3,416,942	52.73%	113 (▲3)
Democratic	164	3,017,689	46.57%	90 (▼3)
Libertarian	6	23,268	0.36%	0
Independent	2	9,799	0.15%	0
Green	5	12,575	0.19%	0
Total	345	6,480,273	100%	203

Popular vote for 203 House seats
Republican	52.73%
Democratic	46.57%
Libertarian	0.36%
Green	0.15%
Independent	0.19%

House seats
Republican	55.67%
Democratic	44.33%

=== Close races ===
Districts where the margin of victory was under 10%:

1. District 158, 1.34%
2. District 160, 1.52%
3. District 168, 1.98%
4. District 33, 2.78% (gain)
5. District 143, 3.06% (gain)
6. District 165, 3.14%
7. District 105, 3.66%
8. District 55, 4.56% (gain)
9. District 18, 4.64%
10. District 119, 5.14%
11. District 72, 5.42%
12. District 50, 6.54%
13. District 26, 7%
14. District 118, 7.06%
15. District 106, 7.14%
16. District 28, 7.46%
17. District 114, 7.74%
18. District 131, 8.5%
19. District 152, 8.84% (gain)
20. District 150, 8.94%
21. District 53, 9.4%
22. District 162, 9.6%
23. District 30, 9.66%
24. District 44, 9.92%

== Results by district ==
District	Party	Incumbent	Status	Party	Candidate	Votes	%
1	Democratic	Pat Harkins	Re-Elected	Democratic	Pat Harkins	17,919	100.00
2	Democratic	Robert Merski	Re-elected	Democratic	Robert Merski	22,342	100.00
3	Democratic	Ryan Bizzarro	Re-Elected	Democratic	Ryan Bizzarro	22,219	61.37
3	Democratic	Ryan Bizzarro	Re-Elected	Republican	Greg Hayes	13,985	38.63
4	Republican	Curt Sonney	Re-Elected	Republican	Curt Sonney	26,762	100.00
5	Republican	Barry Jozwiak	Re-Elected	Republican	Barry Jozwiak	23,291	69.73
5	Republican	Barry Jozwiak	Re-Elected	Democratic	Graham Gonzales	10,112	30.27
6	Republican	Brad Roae	Re-elected	Republican	Brad Roae	21,285	65.35
6	Republican	Brad Roae	Re-elected	Democratic	Matthew Ferrence	11,286	34.65
7	Democratic	Mark Longietti	Re-Elected	Democratic	Mark Longietti	28,297	100.00
8	Republican	Tim Bonner	Re-Elected	Republican	Tim Bonner	23,838	75.15
8	Republican	Tim Bonner	Re-Elected	Democratic	Phillip Heasley	7,883	24.85
9	Democratic	Chris Sainato	Re-Elected	Democratic	Chris Sainato	15,180	50.35
9	Democratic	Chris Sainato	Re-Elected	Republican	Carol Lynne Ryan	12,030	39.90
9	Democratic	Chris Sainato	Re-Elected	Independent	Darryl Audia	2,940	9.75
10	Republican	Aaron Bernstine	Re-elected	Republican	Aaron Bernstine	15,009	51.50
10	Republican	Aaron Bernstine	Re-elected	Democratic	Kolbe Cole	10,032	34.43
10	Republican	Aaron Bernstine	Re-elected	Independent	Johnathan Peffer	4,100	14.07
11	Republican	Marci Mustello	Re-elected	Republican	Marci Mustello	22,956	71.84
11	Republican	Marci Mustello	Re-elected	Democratic	Samuel Doctor	9,043	28.26
12	Republican	Daryl Metcalfe	Re-elected	Republican	Daryl Metcalfe	26,909	61.67
12	Republican	Daryl Metcalfe	Re-elected	Democratic	Daniel Smith Jr	16,724	38.33
13	Republican	John Lawrence	Re-elected	Republican	John Lawrence	20,247	58.95
13	Republican	John Lawrence	Re-elected	Democratic	Richard Ruggieri	14,097	41.05
14	Republican	Jim E. Marshall	Re-elected	Republican	Jim E. Marshall	24,961	69.95
14	Republican	Jim E. Marshall	Re-elected	Democratic	Zach Wilson	10,878	30.35
15	Republican	Josh Kail	Re-elected	Republican	Josh Kail	24,558	70.85
15	Republican	Josh Kail	Re-elected	Democratic	Robert Williams	10,102	29.15
16	Democratic	Robert Matzie	Re-elected	Democratic	Robert Matzie	19,101	56.19
16	Democratic	Robert Matzie	Re-elected	Republican	Rico Elmore	14,891	43.81
17	Republican	Parke Wentling	Re-elected	Republican	Parke Wentling	26,574	100.00
18	Republican	K.C. Tomlinson	Re-elected	Republican	K.C. Tomlinson	16,711	52.32
18	Republican	K.C. Tomlinson	Re-elected	Democratic	Harold Hayes	15,228	47.68
19	Democratic	Jake Wheatley	Re-elected	Democratic	Jake Wheatley	22,700	100.00
20	Democratic	Adam Ravenstahl	Defeated in Primary	Democratic	Emily Kinkead	27,680	100.00
21	Democratic	Sara Innamorato	Re-elected	Democratic	Sara Innamorato	24,057	66.38
21	Democratic	Sara Innamorato	Re-elected	Republican	John Waugh	12,183	33.62
22	Democratic	Peter Schweyer	Re-elected	Democratic	Peter Schweyer	13,969	100.00
23	Democratic	Dan Frankel	Re-elected	Democratic	Dan Frankel	24,685	85.42
23	Democratic	Dan Frankel	Re-elected	Green	Jay Ting Walker	4,212	14.58
24	Democratic	Ed Gainey	Re-elected	Democratic	Ed Gainey	29,919	100.00
25	Democratic	Brandon Markosek	Re-elected	Democratic	Brandon Markosek	19,461	58.32
25	Democratic	Brandon Markosek	Re-elected	Republican	John Ritter	13,908	41.68
26	Republican	Tim Hennessey	Re-elected	Republican	Tim Hennessey	19,769	53.50
26	Republican	Tim Hennessey	Re-elected	Democratic	Paul Friel	17,180	46.50
27	Democratic	Dan Deasy	Re-elected	Democratic	Dan Deasy	26,109	100.00
28	Republican	Mike Turzai	Resigned	Republican	Rob Mercuri	23,806	53.73
28	Republican	Mike Turzai	Resigned	Democratic	Emily Skopov	20,500	46.27
29	Republican	Meghan Schroeder	Re-elected	Republican	Meghan Schroeder	23,237	55.24
29	Republican	Meghan Schroeder	Re-elected	Democratic	Marlene Katz	18,475	43.92
29	Republican	Meghan Schroeder	Re-elected	Independent	Nathanael Schmolze	352	0.84
30	Republican	Lori Mizgorski	Re-elected	Republican	Lori Mizgorski	23,340	54.83
30	Republican	Lori Mizgorski	Re-elected	Democratic	Lissa Geiger Shulman	19,231	45.17
31	Democratic	Perry Warren	Re-elected	Democratic	Perry Warren	26,275	59.69
31	Democratic	Perry Warren	Re-elected	Republican	Charles Adcock	17,742	40.31
32	Democratic	Anthony M. DeLuca	Re-elected	Democratic	Anthony M. DeLuca	30,332	100.00
33	Democratic	Frank Dermody	Defeated	Republican	Carrie DelRosso	16,383	51.39
33	Democratic	Frank Dermody	Defeated	Democratic	Frank Dermody	15,494	48.61
34	Democratic	Summer Lee	Re-elected	Democratic	Summer Lee	27,129	100.00
35	Democratic	Austin Davis	Re-elected	Democratic	Austin Davis	21,335	100.00
36	Democratic	Harry Readshaw	Retired	Democratic	Jessica Benham	20,076	62.61
36	Democratic	Harry Readshaw	Retired	Republican	Adrian Doyle	11,988	37.39
37	Republican	Mindy Fee	Re-elected	Republican	Mindy Fee	25,783	72.91
37	Republican	Mindy Fee	Re-elected	Democratic	John Padora	9,579	27.09
38	Democratic	William C. Kortz	Retired	Democratic	Nick Pisciottano	20,362	56.09
38	Democratic	William C. Kortz	Retired	Republican	Linda Book	15,941	43.91
39	Republican	Mike Puskaric	Re-elected	Republican	Mike Puskaric	23,093	62.82
39	Republican	Mike Puskaric	Re-elected	Democratic	Sara-Summer Oliphant	13,669	37.18
40	Republican	Natalie Mihalek	Re-elected	Republican	Natalie Mihalek	26,485	60.92
40	Republican	Natalie Mihalek	Re-elected	Democratic	Sharon Guidi	16,990	39.08
41	Republican	Brett Miller	Re-elected	Republican	Brett Miller	23,230	57.87
41	Republican	Brett Miller	Re-elected	Democratic	Michele Wherley	16,912	42.13
42	Democratic	Dan Miller	Re-elected	Democratic	Dan Miller	25,580	68.47
42	Democratic	Dan Miller	Re-elected	Republican	Kurt Korinko Jr.	11,778	31.53
43	Republican	Keith Greiner	Re-elected	Republican	Keith Greiner	27,324	100.00
44	Republican	Valerie Gaydos	Re-elected	Republican	Valerie Gaydos	22,140	54.96
44	Republican	Valerie Gaydos	Re-elected	Democratic	Michele Knoll	18,143	45.04
45	Democratic	Anita Astorino Kulik	Re-elected	Democratic	Anita Astorino Kulik	22,853	61.71
45	Democratic	Anita Astorino Kulik	Re-elected	Republican	Danny Devito	14,180	38.29
46	Republican	Jason Ortitay	Re-elected	Republican	Jason Ortitay	25,271	62.41
46	Republican	Jason Ortitay	Re-elected	Democratic	Byron Timmins	15,224	37.59
47	Republican	Keith J. Gillespie	Re-elected	Republican	Keith J. Gillespie	22,066	65.37
47	Republican	Keith J. Gillespie	Re-elected	Republican	Donald Owens	11,687	34.63
48	Republican	Tim O'Neal	Re-elected	Republican	Tim O'Neal	20,571	58.41
48	Republican	Tim O'Neal	Re-elected	Democratic	Harlan Shober	14,646	41.59
49	Republican	Bud Cook	Re-elected	Republican	Bud Cook	17,926	63.56
49	Republican	Bud Cook	Re-elected	Democratic	Randy Barli	10,278	36.44
50	Democratic	Pam Snyder	Re-elected	Democratic	Pam Snyder	14,587	53.27
50	Democratic	Pam Snyder	Re-elected	Republican	Larry Yost	12,796	46.73
51	Republican	Matt Dowling	Re-elected	Republican	Matt Dowling	19,592	68.64
51	Republican	Matt Dowling	Re-elected	Democratic	Kevin Jones	8,953	31.36
52	Republican	Ryan Warner	Re-elected	Republican	Ryan Warner	21,219	70.40
52	Republican	Ryan Warner	Re-elected	Democratic	Harry Cochran	8,923	29.60
53	Democratic	Steve Malagari	Re-elected	Democratic	Steve Malagari	19,974	54.70
53	Democratic	Steve Malagari	Re-elected	Republican	Allan Arnott	16,543	45.30
54	Republican	Robert Brooks	Re-elected	Republican	Robert Brooks	30,446	100.00
55	Democratic	Joseph Petrarca Jr.	Defeated	Republican	Jason Silvis	16,446	52.28
55	Democratic	Joseph Petrarca Jr.	Defeated	Democratic	Joseph Petrarca Jr.	14,914	47.72
56	Republican	George Dunbar	Re-elected	Republican	George Dunbar	32,942	100.00
57	Republican	Eric Nelson	Re-elected	Republican	Eric Nelson	28,797	100.00
58	Republican	Eric Davanzo	Re-elected	Republican	Eric Davanzo	20,591	63.21
58	Republican	Eric Davanzo	Re-elected	Democratic	Robert Prah	11,982	36.79
59	Republican	Mike Reese	Re-elected	Republican	Mike Reese	32,189	100.00
60	Republican	Jeff Pyle	Re-elected	Republican	Jeff Pyle	29,898	100.00
61	Democratic	Liz Hanbidge	Re-elected	Democratic	Liz Hanbidge	25,065	59.83
61	Democratic	Liz Hanbidge	Re-elected	Republican	Florence Friebel	16,832	40.17
62	Republican	James Struzzi	Re-elected	Republican	James Struzzi	19,943	68.41
62	Republican	James Struzzi	Re-elected	Democratic	Dennis Semsick	9,211	31.59
63	Republican	Donna Oberlander	Re-elected	Republican	Donna Oberlander	26,480	100.00
64	Republican	Lee James	Re-elected	Republican	Lee James	23,004	80.46
64	Republican	Lee James	Re-elected	Green	Michael Bagdes-Canning	5,587	19.54
65	Republican	Kathy Rapp	Re-elected	Republican	Kathy Rapp	25,343	100.00
66	Republican	Cris Dush	Running for State Senate	Republican	Brian Smith	28,093	100.00
67	Republican	Martin Causer	Re-elected	Republican	Martin Causer	27,302	100.00
68	Republican	Clint Owlett	Re-elected	Republican	Clint Owlett	26,055	89.11
68	Republican	Clint Owlett	Re-elected	Libertarian	Noyes Lawton	3,183	10.89
69	Republican	Carl Walker Metzgar	Re-elected	Republican	Carl Walker Metzgar	31,077	100.00
70	Democratic	Matthew Bradford	Re-elected	Democratic	Matthew Bradford	21,596	69.11
70	Democratic	Matthew Bradford	Re-elected	Republican	Daniel Wissert	9,653	30.89
71	Republican	Jim Rigby	Re-elected	Republican	Jim Rigby	26,689	100.00
72	Democratic	Frank Burns	Re-elected	Democratic	Frank Burns	16,886	52.71
72	Democratic	Frank Burns	Re-elected	Republican	Howard Terndrup	15,150	47.29
73	Republican	Tommy Sankey	Re-elected	Republican	Tommy Sankey	26,933	100.00
74	Democratic	Dan K. Williams	Re-elected	Democratic	Dan K. Williams	21,730	64.38
74	Democratic	Dan K. Williams	Re-elected	Republican	Dale Hensel	12,025	35.62
75	Republican	Matt Gabler	Retired	Republican	Michael Armanini	25,558	76.22
75	Republican	Matt Gabler	Retired	Democratic	Ryan Grimm	7,973	23.78
76	Republican	Stephanie Borowicz	Re-elected	Republican	Stephanie Borowicz	19,175	65.49
76	Republican	Stephanie Borowicz	Re-elected	Democratic	Joseph Waltz	10,105	34.51
77	Democratic	Scott Conklin	Re-elected	Democratic	Scott Conklin	14,290	65.81
77	Democratic	Scott Conklin	Re-elected	Republican	Stephen Yetsko	7,424	34.19
78	Republican	Jesse Topper	Re-elected	Republican	Jesse Topper	31,550	100.00
79	Republican	Louis Schmitt Jr.	Re-elected	Republican	Louis Schmitt Jr.	20,103	70.19
79	Republican	Louis Schmitt Jr.	Re-elected	Democratic	Jason Runk	8,536	29.81
80	Republican	Jim Gregory	Re-elected	Republican	Jim Gregory	30,950	100.00
81	Republican	Rich Irvin	Re-elected	Republican	Rich Irvin	23,361	68.75
81	Republican	Rich Irvin	Re-elected	Democratic	Ian Kidd	10,618	31.25
82	Republican	John D. Hershey	Re-elected	Republican	John D. Hershey	26,822	100.00
83	Republican	Jeff Wheeland	Re-elected	Republican	Jeff Wheeland	19,065	67.32
83	Republican	Jeff Wheeland	Re-elected	Democratic	Airneezer Page	9,253	32.68
84	Republican	Garth Everett	Retired	Republican	Joe Hamm	25,961	78.82
84	Republican	Garth Everett	Retired	Democratic	Amanda Waldman	6,975	21.18
85	Republican	David H. Rowe	Re-elected	Republican	David H. Rowe	20,783	68.14
85	Republican	David H. Rowe	Re-elected	Democratic	Kathleen M. Evans	9,719	31.86
86	Republican	Mark Keller	Retired	Republican	Perry A. Stambaugh	27,355	100.00
87	Republican	Greg Rothman	Re-elected	Republican	Greg Rothman	24,239	55.92
87	Republican	Greg Rothman	Re-elected	Democratic	Nicole Miller	19,104	44.08
88	Republican	Sheryl M. Delozier	Re-elected	Republican	Sheryl M. Delozier	21,344	58.09
88	Republican	Sheryl M. Delozier	Re-elected	Democratic	Tara Shakespeare	15,396	41.91
89	Republican	Rob Kauffman	Re-elected	Republican	Rob Kauffman	28,302	100.00
90	Republican	Paul Schemel	Re-elected	Republican	Paul Schemel	30,095	100.00
91	Republican	Dan Moul	Re-elected	Republican	Dan Moul	28,932	100.00
92	Republican	Dawn Keefer	Re-elected	Republican	Dawn Keefer	27,049	71.97
92	Republican	Dawn Keefer	Re-elected	Democratic	Douglas Ross	10,533	28.03
93	Republican	Paul M. Jones	Re-elected	Republican	Paul M. Jones	27,827	100.00
94	Republican	Stan Saylor	Re-elected	Republican	Stan Saylor	26,266	100.00
95	Democratic	Carol Hill-Evans	Re-elected	Democratic	Carol Hill-Evans	14,120	63.98
95	Democratic	Carol Hill-Evans	Re-elected	Republican	Kathryn French	7,950	36.02
96	Democratic	Mike Sturla	Re-elected	Democratic	Mike Sturla	20,880	100.00
97	Republican	Steven Mentzer	Re-elected	Republican	Steven Mentzer	24,352	56.87
97	Republican	Steven Mentzer	Re-elected	Democratic	Dana Gulick	18,466	43.13
98	Republican	David Hickernell	Re-elected	Republican	David Hickernell	22,412	66.61
98	Republican	David Hickernell	Re-elected	Democratic	Bill Troutman	11,235	33.39
99	Republican	David H. Zimmerman	Re-elected	Republican	David H. Zimmerman	21,187	73.40
99	Republican	David H. Zimmerman	Re-elected	Democratic	Richard Hodge	7,680	26.60
100	Republican	Bryan Cutler	Re-elected	Republican	Bryan Cutler	24,315	100.00
101	Republican	Frank Ryan	Re-elected	Republican	Frank Ryan	21,611	62.82
101	Republican	Frank Ryan	Re-elected	Democratic	Calvin Clements	12,792	37.18
102	Republican	Russ Diamond	Re-elected	Republican	Russ Diamond	23,197	70.20
102	Republican	Russ Diamond	Re-elected	Democratic	Matthew Duvall	9,845	29.80
103	Democratic	Patty Kim	Re-elected	Democratic	Patty Kim	22,460	100.00
104	Republican	Sue Helm	Re-elected	Republican	Susan Helm	20,735	55.88
104	Republican	Sue Helm	Re-elected	Democratic	Patricia Smith	16,371	44.12
105	Republican	Andrew Lewis	Re-elected	Republican	Andrew Lewis	21,320	51.83
105	Republican	Andrew Lewis	Re-elected	Democratic	Brittney Rodas	19,814	48.17
106	Republican	Tom Mehaffie	Re-elected	Republican	Tom Mehaffie	19,283	53.57
106	Republican	Tom Mehaffie	Re-elected	Democratic	Lindsay Drew	16,714	46.43
107	Republican	Kurt Masser	Re-elected	Republican	Kurt Masser	23,083	82.20
107	Republican	Kurt Masser	Re-elected	Libertarian	Ryan Bourinski	4,992	17.80
108	Republican	Lynda Schlegel-Culver	Re-elected	Republican	Lynda Schlegel-Culver	27,354	100.00
109	Republican	David R. Millard	Re-elected	Republican	David R. Millard	19,127	66.16
109	Republican	David R. Millard	Re-elected	Democratic	Will Monahan	7,334	25.37
109	Republican	David R. Millard	Re-elected	Independent	Roger Nuss	2,449	8.47
110	Republican	Tina Pickett	Re-elected	Republican	Tina Pickett	24,855	86.62
110	Republican	Tina Pickett	Re-elected	Libertarian	Lawrence D Frey III	3,840	13.38
111	Republican	Jonathan Fritz	Re-elected	Republican	Jonathan Fritz	26,472	100.00
112	Democratic	Kyle Mullins	Re-elected	Democratic	Kyle Mullins	21,274	65.22
112	Democratic	Kyle Mullins	Re-elected	Republican	Mary Alice Noldy	11,346	34.78
113	Democratic	Marty Flynn	Re-elected	Democratic	Marty Flynn	20,308	68.42
113	Democratic	Marty Flynn	Re-elected	Republican	William Kresge	9,374	31.58
114	Democratic	Bridget Malloy Kosierowski	Re-elected	Democratic	Bridget Malloy Kosierowski	19,890	53.87
114	Democratic	Bridget Malloy Kosierowski	Re-elected	Republican	James May	17,030	46.13
115	Democratic	Maureen Madden	Re-elected	Democratic	Maureen Madden	17,605	63.92
115	Democratic	Maureen Madden	Re-elected	Republican	Dulce Ridder	9,939	36.08
116	Republican	Tarah Toohil	Re-elected	Republican	Tarah Toohil	19,167	72.31
116	Republican	Tarah Toohil	Re-elected	Democratic	Todd Eachus	7,338	27.69
117	Republican	Karen Boback	Re-elected	Republican	Karen Boback	28,963	100.00
118	Democratic	Michael B. Carroll	Re-elected	Democratic	Michael B. Carroll	18,759	53.53
118	Democratic	Michael B. Carroll	Re-elected	Republican	Andrew Holter	16,283	46.47
119	Democratic	Gerald Mullery	Re-elected	Democratic	Gerald Mullery	14,961	52.57
119	Democratic	Gerald Mullery	Re-elected	Republican	John Chura	13,500	47.43
120	Republican	Aaron Kaufer	Re-elected	Republican	Aaron Kaufer	20,428	63.12
120	Republican	Aaron Kaufer	Re-elected	Democratic	Joanna Bryn Smith	11,934	36.88
121	Democratic	Eddie Day Pashinski	Re-elected	Democratic	Eddie Day Pashinski	18,764	100.00
122	Republican	Doyle Heffley	Re-elected	Republican	Doyle Heffley	28,398	100.00
123	Democratic	Neal Goodman	Retired	Republican	Tim Twardzik	15,090	62.63
123	Democratic	Neal Goodman	Retired	Democratic	Peter Symons	9,004	37.37
124	Republican	Jerry Knowles	Re-elected	Republican	Jerry Knowles	23,111	72.04
124	Republican	Jerry Knowles	Re-elected	Democratic	Taylor Picone	8,972	27.96
125	Republican	Mike Tobash	Retired	Republican	Joe Kerwin	28,076	100.00
126	Democratic	Mark Rozzi	Re-elected	Democratic	Mark Rozzi	18,508	67.38
126	Democratic	Mark Rozzi	Re-elected	Republican	James Oswald	8,961	32.62
127	Democratic	Thomas Caltagirone	Retired	Democratic	Manny Guzman Jr.	11,786	72.94
127	Democratic	Thomas Caltagirone	Retired	Republican	Vincent Gagliardo Jr.	4,372	27.06
128	Republican	Mark M. Gillen	Re-elected	Republican	Mark M. Gillen	30,348	100.00
129	Republican	Jim Cox	Re-elected	Republican	Jim Cox	21,067	57.33
129	Republican	Jim Cox	Re-elected	Democratic	Kelly McDonough	15,682	42.67
130	Republican	David Maloney	Re-elected	Republican	David Maloney	23,508	63.81
130	Republican	David Maloney	Re-elected	Democratic	Francis Foley	13,332	36.19
131	Republican	Justin Simmons	Retired	Republican	Milou Mackenzie	22,489	54.25
131	Republican	Justin Simmons	Retired	Democratic	Kevin Branco	18,964	45.75
132	Democratic	Mike Schlossberg	Re-elected	Democratic	Mike Schlossberg	17,025	67.89
132	Democratic	Mike Schlossberg	Re-elected	Republican	Michael McCreary	8,051	32.11
133	Democratic	Jeanne McNeill	Re-elected	Democratic	Jeanne McNeill	18,844	60.65
133	Democratic	Jeanne McNeill	Re-elected	Republican	David Molony	12,227	39.35
134	Republican	Ryan Mackenzie	Re-elected	Republican	Ryan Mackenzie	23,485	60.06
134	Republican	Ryan Mackenzie	Re-elected	Democratic	Marc Basist	15,618	39.94
135	Democratic	Steve Samuelson	Re-elected	Democratic	Steve Samuelson	19,924	65.62
135	Democratic	Steve Samuelson	Re-elected	Democratic	Scott Hough	10,438	34.38
136	Democratic	Robert L. Freeman	Re-elected	Democratic	Robert L. Freeman	21,469	100.00
137	Republican	Joe Emrick	Re-elected	Republican	Joe Emrick	23,846	63.30
137	Republican	Joe Emrick	Re-elected	Democratic	Katelind Brennan	13,828	36.70
138	Republican	Marcia Hahn	Retired	Republican	Ann Flood	23,555	56.15
138	Republican	Marcia Hahn	Retired	Democratic	Tara Zrinski	18,396	43.85
139	Republican	Michael Peifer	Re-elected	Republican	Michael Peifer	24,597	68.41
139	Republican	Michael Peifer	Re-elected	Democratic	Marian Keegan	11,359	31.59
140	Democratic	John Galloway	Re-elected	Democratic	John Galloway	19,840	59.99
140	Democratic	John Galloway	Re-elected	Republican	Jeanine McGee	13,230	40.01
141	Democratic	Tina Davis	Re-elected	Democratic	Tina Davis	19,364	62.67
141	Democratic	Tina Davis	Re-elected	Republican	Kelly Bellerby-Allen	11,532	37.33
142	Republican	Frank Farry	Re-elected	Republican	Frank Farry	25,916	61.18
142	Republican	Frank Farry	Re-elected	Democratic	Lauren Lareau	16,443	38.82
143	Democratic	Wendy Ullman	Defeated	Republican	Shelby Labs	22,553	51.53
143	Democratic	Wendy Ullman	Defeated	Democratic	Wendy Ullman	21,217	48.47
144	Republican	Todd Polinchock	Re-elected	Republican	Todd Polinchock	22,915	55.50
144	Republican	Todd Polinchock	Re-elected	Democratic	Gary Spillane	18,372	44.50
145	Republican	Craig Staats	Re-elected	Republican	Craig Staats	22,482	59.66
145	Republican	Craig Staats	Re-elected	Democratic	Robyn Colajezzi	15,203	40.34
146	Democratic	Joe Ciresi	Re-elected	Democratic	Joe Ciresi	20,719	56.84
146	Democratic	Joe Ciresi	Re-elected	Republican	Tom Neafcy	15,731	43.16
147	Republican	Marcy Toepel	Retired	Republican	Tracy Pennycuick	21,437	54.72
147	Republican	Marcy Toepel	Retired	Democratic	Jill Dennin	16,534	42.20
147	Republican	Marcy Toepel	Retired	Libertarian	Jared Martin	1,207	3.08
148	Democratic	Mary Jo Daley	Re-elected	Democratic	Mary Jo Daley	31,559	70.06
148	Democratic	Mary Jo Daley	Re-elected	Republican	Allen Anderson	13,489	29.94
149	Democratic	Tim Briggs	Re-elected	Democratic	Tim Briggs	28,706	70.05
149	Democratic	Tim Briggs	Re-elected	Republican	William A. Michael	12,275	29.95
150	Democratic	Joe Webster	Re-elected	Democratic	Joe Webster	20,594	54.47
150	Democratic	Joe Webster	Re-elected	Republican	Beth Ann Mazza	17,217	45.53
151	Republican	Todd Stephens	Re-elected	Republican	Todd Stephens	21,074	53.11
151	Republican	Todd Stephens	Re-elected	Democratic	Jonathan Kassa	18,604	46.89
152	Republican	Tom Murt	Retired	Democratic	Nancy Guenst	20,208	50.97
152	Republican	Tom Murt	Retired	Republican	Karen Houck	16,701	42.13
152	Republican	Tom Murt	Retired	Independent	John Weinrich Sr.	2,734	6.90
153	Democratic	Ben Sanchez	Re-elected	Democratic	Ben Sanchez	30,434	77.01
153	Democratic	Ben Sanchez	Re-elected	Libertarian	Marc Bozzacco	9,088	22.99
154	Democratic	Steve McCarter	Retired	Democratic	Napoleon Nelson	30,610	77.72
154	Democratic	Steve McCarter	Retired	Republican	Kathleen Bowers	8,776	22.28
155	Democratic	Danielle Friel Otten	Re-elected	Democratic	Danielle Friel Otten	25,140	55.98
155	Democratic	Danielle Friel Otten	Re-elected	Republican	Michael Taylor	19,766	44.02
156	Democratic	Carolyn Comitta	Ran for State Senate	Democratic	Dianne Herrin	21,956	55.34
156	Democratic	Carolyn Comitta	Ran for State Senate	Republican	Leonard Iacono	17,718	44.66
157	Democratic	Melissa Shusterman	Re-elected	Democratic	Melissa Shusterman	25,238	62.47
157	Democratic	Melissa Shusterman	Re-elected	Republican	Bryan Walters	15,161	37.53
158	Democratic	Christina Sappey	Re-elected	Democratic	Christina Sappey	19,324	50.67
158	Democratic	Christina Sappey	Re-elected	Republican	Eric Roe	18,816	49.33
159	Democratic	Brian Joseph Kirkland	Re-elected	Democratic	Brian Joseph Kirkland	17,558	71.58
159	Democratic	Brian Joseph Kirkland	Re-elected	Republican	Ruth Moton	6,972	28.42
160	Republican	Stephen Barrar	Retired	Republican	Craig Williams	20,408	50.76
160	Republican	Stephen Barrar	Retired	Democratic	Anton Andrew	19,798	49.24
161	Democratic	Leanne Krueger	Re-elected	Democratic	Leanne Krueger	22,764	57.01
161	Democratic	Leanne Krueger	Re-elected	Republican	Ralph Shicatano Jr.	17,169	42.99
162	Democratic	David Delloso	Re-elected	Democratic	David Delloso	18,693	54.30
162	Democratic	David Delloso	Re-elected	Republican	Peter Gaglio Jr.	15,731	45.70
163	Democratic	Michael Zabel	Re-elected	Democratic	Michael Zabel	22,259	60.26
163	Democratic	Michael Zabel	Re-elected	Republican	Michael McCollum	14,680	39.74
164	Democratic	Margo L. Davidson	Re-elected	Democratic	Margo L. Davidson	24,398	100.00
165	Democratic	Jennifer O'Mara	Re-elected	Democratic	Jennifer O'Mara	21,529	51.57
165	Democratic	Jennifer O'Mara	Re-elected	Republican	Robert Smythe Jr.	20,222	48.43
166	Democratic	Greg Vitali	Re-elected	Democratic	Greg Vitali	28,803	70.89
166	Democratic	Greg Vitali	Re-elected	Republican	Christine Boyle	11,830	29.11
167	Democratic	Kristine Howard	Re-elected	Democratic	Kristine Howard	24,261	55.81
167	Democratic	Kristine Howard	Re-elected	Republican	Wendy Leland	19,211	44.19
168	Republican	Christopher B. Quinn	Re-elected	Republican	Christopher B. Quinn	22,399	50.99
168	Republican	Christopher B. Quinn	Re-elected	Democratic	Debra Ciamacca	21,526	49.01
169	Republican	Kate Klunk	Re-elected	Republican	Kate Klunk	29,957	100.00
170	Republican	Martina White	Re-elected	Republican	Martina White	17,693	60.43
170	Republican	Martina White	Re-elected	Democratic	Michael Doyle Jr.	11,586	39.57
171	Republican	Kerry Benninghoff	Re-elected	Republican	Kerry Benninghoff	24,322	61.39
171	Republican	Kerry Benninghoff	Re-elected	Democratic	Peter Buckland	15,298	38.61
172	Democratic	Kevin J. Boyle	Re-elected	Democratic	Kevin J. Boyle	16,426	61.19
172	Democratic	Kevin J. Boyle	Re-elected	Republican	Haroon Bashir	10,420	38.81
173	Democratic	Michael Driscoll	Re-elected	Democratic	Michael Driscoll	17,606	100.00
174	Democratic	Ed Neilson	Re-elected	Democratic	Ed Neilson	18,327	100.00
175	Democratic	Mary Isaacson	Re-elected	Democratic	Mary Isaacson	30,233	100.00
176	Republican	Jack Rader	Re-elected	Republican	Jack Rader	17,736	55.11
176	Republican	Jack Rader	Re-elected	Democratic	Claudette Williams	14,445	44.89
177	Democratic	Joseph C. Hohenstein	Re-elected	Democratic	Joseph C. Hohenstein	15,640	59.90
177	Democratic	Joseph C. Hohenstein	Re-elected	Republican	John Nungesser	10,470	40.10
178	Republican	Wendi Thomas	Re-elected	Republican	Wendi Thomas	24,787	55.43
178	Republican	Wendi Thomas	Re-elected	Democratic	Ann Marie Mitchell	19,927	44.57
179	Democratic	Jason Dawkins	Re-elected	Democratic	Jason Dawkins	18,951	100.00
180	Democratic	Angel Cruz	Re-elected	Democratic	Angel Cruz	13,558	100.00
181	Democratic	Malcolm Kenyatta	Re-elected	Democratic	Malcolm Kenyatta	25,258	100.00
182	Democratic	Brian Sims	Re-elected	Democratic	Brian Sims	34,225	83.08
182	Democratic	Brian Sims	Re-elected	Republican	Drew Murray	6,969	16.92
183	Republican	Zach Mako	Re-elected	Republican	Zach Mako	22,294	61.03
183	Republican	Zach Mako	Re-elected	Democratic	Jason Ruff	14,233	38.97
184	Democratic	Elizabeth Fiedler	Re-elected	Democratic	Elizabeth Fiedler	20,243	71.07
184	Democratic	Elizabeth Fiedler	Re-elected	Republican	Lou Menna IV	8,240	28.93
185	Democratic	Maria Donatucci	Lost Primary	Democratic	Regina Young	23,825	100.00
186	Democratic	Jordan A. Harris	Re-elected	Democratic	Jordan A. Harris	31.994	100.00
187	Republican	Gary Day	Re-elected	Republican	Gary Day	23,335	61.51
187	Republican	Gary Day	Re-elected	Democratic	Michael Blichar Jr.	14,602	38.49
188	Democratic	James R. Roebuck Jr.	Lost Primary	Democratic	Rick Krajewski	25,256	100.00
189	Republican	Rosemary Brown	Re-elected	Republican	Rosemary Brown	18,408	59.55
189	Republican	Rosemary Brown	Re-elected	Republican	Adam Rodriguez	12,502	40.45
190	Democratic	G. Roni Green	Defeated in primary	Democratic	Amen Brown	27,869	94.72
190	Democratic	G. Roni Green	Defeated in primary	Republican	Wanda Logan	1,555	5.28
191	Democratic	Joanna E. McClinton	Re-elected	Democratic	Joanna E. McClinton	25,065	100.00
192	Democratic	Morgan Cephas	Re-elected	Democratic	Morgan Cephas	29,199	100.00
193	Republican	Torren Ecker	Re-elected	Republican	Torren Ecker	28,539	100.00
194	Democratic	Pamela DeLissio	Re-elected	Democratic	Pamela DeLissio	27,965	74.25
194	Democratic	Pamela DeLissio	Re-elected	Republican	Lisa Riley	8,738	23.20
194	Democratic	Pamela DeLissio	Re-elected	Libertarian	Matt Baltsar	958	2.54
195	Democratic	Donna Bullock	Re-elected	Democratic	Donna Bullock	30,022	100.00
196	Republican	Seth Grove	Re-elected	Republican	Seth Grove	28,818	100.00
197	Democratic	Danilo Burgos	Re-elected	Democratic	Danilo Burgos	18,892	100.00
198	Democratic	Rosita Youngblood	Retired	Democratic	Darisha Parker	25,464	100.00
199	Republican	Barbara Gleim	Re-elected	Republican	Barbara Gleim	21,678	63.56
199	Republican	Barbara Gleim	Re-elected	Democratic	Janelle Crossley	12,431	36.44
200	Democratic	Chris Rabb	Re-elected	Democratic	Chris Rabb	36,437	100.00
201	Democratic	Stephen Kinsey	Re-elected	Democratic	Stephen Kinsey	26,663	100.00
202	Democratic	Jared Solomon	Re-elected	Democratic	Jared Solomon	18,116	100.00
203	Democratic	Isabella Fitzgerald	Re-elected	Democratic	Isabella Fitzgerald	27,126	100.00

== Notes ==
Partisan clients

== See also ==
- 2020 Pennsylvania elections
- Elections in Pennsylvania
- List of Pennsylvania state legislatures
