= Pennsylvania Legislative Black Caucus =

- Abbreviation: PLBC
- Chairperson: Napoleon Nelson
- Secretary: Ismail Smith-Wade-El
- Vice Chair: Darisha Parker
- Treasurer: Justin C. Fleming
- Founder: K. Leroy Irvis
- Founded: 1973; 53 years ago

Website
- https://pahouse.com/PLBC/

The Pennsylvania Legislative Black Caucus is an American political organization composed of African Americans elected to the Pennsylvania General Assembly.

== Role ==
By drafting and sponsoring legislation to address constituent needs and by examining all bills that affect the black populace, the Caucus acts as a legislative body on behalf of the black community. The Caucus presents a black perspective from the entire state to the Legislature and advocates public policies that promote black social, cultural and economic progress, statewide. In addition, the Caucus serves as a research study group to generate pertinent data in support of appropriate public policies.

== Current membership ==
As of April 9, 2026

Member Name	Party	Chamber	District	Officer Position
Napoleon Nelson	Democratic	House	154	Chair
Darisha Parker	Democratic	House	198	Vice Chair
Ismail Smith-Wade-El	Democratic	House	49	Secretary
Justin Fleming	Democratic	House	105	Treasurer
Tarik Khan	Democratic	House	194	Subcommittee Chair
Rick Krajewski	Democratic	House	188	Subcommittee Chair
La'Tasha Mayes	Democratic	House	24	Subcommittee Chair
Regina Young	Democratic	House	185	Subcommittee Chair
Aerion Abney	Democratic	House	19	
Anthony A. Bellmon	Democratic	House	203	
Amen Brown	Democratic	House	10	
Danilo Burgos	Democratic	House	197	
Andre Carroll	Democratic	House	201	
Johanny Cepeda-Freytiz	Democratic	House	129	
Morgan Cephas	Democratic	House	192	
Gina Curry	Democratic	House	164	
Jason Dawkins	Democratic	House	179	
Jose Giral	Democratic	House	180	
G. Roni Green	Democratic	House	190	
Manny Guzman	Democratic	House	127	
Jordan A. Harris	Democratic	House	186	
Keith Harris	Democratic	House	195	
Art Haywood	Democratic	Senate	4	
Carol Hill-Evans	Democratic	House	95	
Vincent Hughes	Democratic	Senate	7	
Carol Kazeem	Democratic	House	159	
Malcolm Kenyatta	Democratic	House	181	
Patty Kim	Democratic	Senate	15	
Dave Madsen	Democratic	House	104	
Joanna McClinton	Democratic	House	191	
Lindsay Powell	Democratic	House	21	
Chris Rabb	Democratic	House	200	
Nikil Saval	Democratic	Senate	1	
Greg Scott	Democratic	House	54	
Sharif Street	Democratic	Senate	3	
Arvind Venkat	Democratic	House	30	
Anthony H. Williams	Democratic	Senate	8	
Dan K. Williams	Democratic	House	74	
