= Amen Brown =

American politician

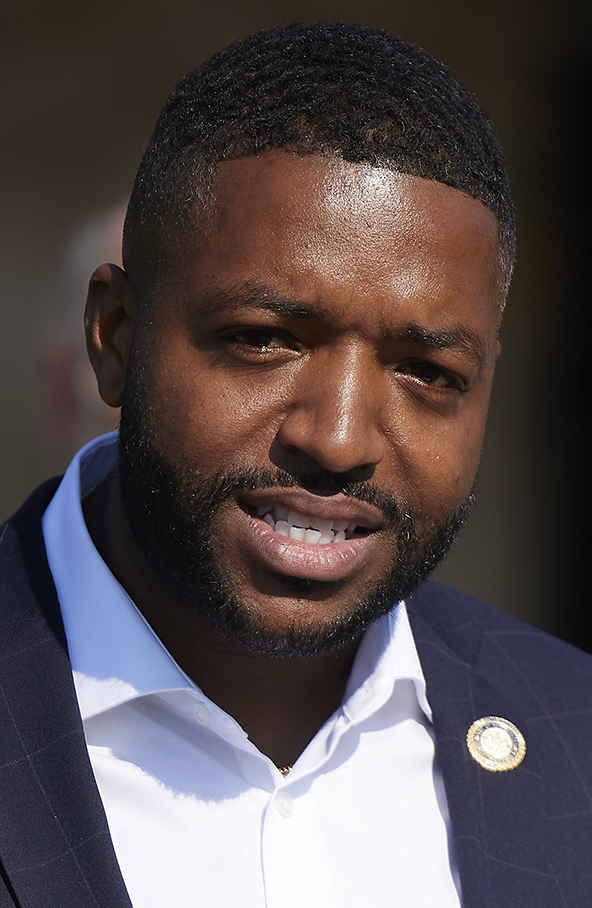

Member of the Pennsylvania House of Representatives
- Incumbent
- Assumed office January 5, 2021
- Preceded by: G. Roni Green
- Constituency: 190th District (2021–2022); 10th District (2023–present)

Personal details
- Born: c. 1987 Philadelphia, Pennsylvania, U.S.
- Party: Democratic
- Children: 2
- Education: Community College of Philadelphia

Amen R. Brown (born c. 1987) is an American politician. He is a member of the Pennsylvania House of Representatives, representing the 10th District since 2023. Brown previously represented the 190th District from 2021 to 2022 before redistricting moved him to the 10th District.

== Early life and education ==
Brown was born and raised in West Philadelphia. He grew up in a single parent household with his eight siblings. His mother was addicted to drugs and his father was incarcerated. At age 12, a gunman shot him and a friend in the back near his family home at 56th and Market. A bullet fragment would remain lodged between his ribs into his adult life. In high school, Brown was arrested during a police raid at a corner store. He was in jail for 45 days before the charges of felony drug-dealing were dropped.

After graduating from Overbrook High School, in 2006, he attended the Community College of Philadelphia with the intention of becoming a school principal. He left college early to pursue his business career.

== Business career ==
At age 22, Brown co-founded the Education Nation Learning Academy, a child care facility in Frankford. A few years later, he opened a second facility. Brown left the partnership and founded the Overbrook Beacon Community Center in Overbrook.

He has also worked as the coordinator for the University of Pennsylvania Sayre Community School Beacon.

== Political career ==
In March 2019, Brown ran in the special election held to fill the 190th state house seat vacated after Vanessa L. Brown resigned. He ran as a member of the Amen Brown Party and won 20% of the vote in a four-way race, losing to Democrat Movita Johnson-Harrell.

=== State representative ===
In June 2020, Brown ran as a Democrat, defeating incumbent G. Roni Green in the Democratic primary, winning by just 600 votes. He campaigned during the COVID-19 pandemic by delivering masks and hand sanitizer.

Brown was elected to the Pennsylvania House of Representatives in November 2020, winning 95% of the vote and defeating Republican Wanda Logan.

Following redistricting in 2021, Brown successfully ran for the 10th District seat in 2022. This was despite an attempt to have Brown removed from the primary ballot after it was revealed Brown failed to properly fill out a required list of financial interests. Brown's name was allowed to remain on the ballot, though a judge did chastise Brown for displaying “an ignorance and shocking lack of care of the law.” Brown faced a similar challenge to his candidacy again in 2024.

=== 2023 Philadelphia mayoral election ===
The Philadelphia Inquirer reported on December 5, 2022, Brown was planning to declare his candidacy as a Democratic candidate for the 2023 Philadelphia mayoral election. He announced his candidacy on December 16, 2022. His platform centered around fighting crime and improving the city's standard of living. In March 2023, the validity of Brown's candidacy was challenged. Attorney Kevin Greenberg challenged Brown's candidacy on the basis that some 2,700 signatures on Brown's nominating petitions were allegedly fraudulent. Greenberg additionally said omissions in Brown's financial statements should also disqualify him from the race. Brown himself claimed the challenge was a "smear tactic" arranged by fellow candidate Jeff Brown (no relation to Brown). Greenberg worked for Jeff Brown, and several individuals who reviewed Brown's nominating petitions had ties to Jeff Brown's campaign. Around 2,000 signatures on Brown's nominating petitions were thrown out, but he was still left with the required minimum to remain on the ballot. A judge also allowed Brown to refile his financial statement and remain on the ballot.

Brown kept a low profile during the mayoral race; skipping several forums where most other candidates were present. He was considered a "longshot" candidate. Because of his laxed campaign and larger absence from party functions, Bob Brady, the chair of Philadelphia's Democratic Party, removed Brown as 60th Ward Leader and installed a temporary replacement. Brown ultimately came in sixth in the primary with just over 3,000 votes, or 1.3%.

== Political positions ==
The Philadelphia Inquirer has labeled Brown as a "centrist" or "moderate" Democrat. Philadelphia magazine called Brown "[t]he closest thing Philly has to an Eric Adams."

=== Criminal justice and policing ===
The Philadelphia Inquirer described Brown as "unabashedly pro-law enforcement."

According to Axios, Brown is known for being hard on crime, and has pushed for mandatory minimum sentences. In 2021, Brown was the primary sponsor for a bill increasing Pennsylvania's mandatory minimum sentences for individuals with a prior record who are arrested for gun-related offenses. Under Pennsylvania law, the mandatory minimum would be two years; Brown's bill would increase it to ten years. Originally boasting a bipartisan slate of sponsors, all co-sponsoring Democrats (except for Representative Frank Burns) later dropped their support of Brown's bill. The bill passed the State House's judiciary committee, but never was put to a vote in the State House proper.

Brown has argued for more policing to "provide much needed support in Philadelphia in addressing [the] gun violence crisis." He called on Pennsylvania Governor Tom Wolf to deploy the Pennsylvania National Guard to help police the streets of Philadelphia.

Despite supporting Philadelphia District Attorney Larry Krasner's view on criminal justice reform, Brown has been "deeply critical" of him, according to The Philadelphia Inquirer. Specifically Brown has criticized Krasner for not thoroughly prosecuting repeat offenders. In 2022, Brown voted against the creation of a State House select committee designed to investigate Krasner's potential impeachment, but later accepted a seat on the committee. Brown did vote to find Krasner in contempt for failing to comply with a committee subpoena, but was absent when the House impeached Krasner. He later said he was "on the fence" whether Krasner should be removed from office. When asked at a 2023 Philadelphia mayoral debate, Brown replied in the negative when asked if Krasner's policies made Philadelphia safe.

Following the 2023 killing of Temple University police officer Christopher Fitzgerald, a cousin of Brown's, he introduced a bill to mandate officers in high-crime areas have partners and better body armor. Fitzgerald's father, Joel Fitzgerald, a former Philadelphia police officer and former Allentown, Pennsylvania police chief, was the primary architect of Brown's public safety plan when he ran for Mayor of Philadelphia.

Brown supports a ski-mask ban in Philadelphia. When running for mayor, his platform prioritized the creation of a social media task force to monitor gang activity. Brown supports the involuntary removal of panhandlers from business fronts.

=== Education ===
Brown supports charter school. PACs linked to Jeff Yass, a businessman, who supports school choice, have given Brown at least $62,500 since the start of 2021, which is roughly 40% of his total donations of his state house campaign in that same time period. Brown was the only Democrat in the State House to vote for a bill that would have created a voucher program for children attending schools that have low cumulative test scores, though he later had his vote reversed. During a 2023 Philadelphia mayoral debate, Brown voiced the idea of replacing the elected Philadelphia school board with an appointed one. He credited the existing board with causing poor conditions in schools.

=== Illegal dirt bikes and ATVs ===
He has been outspoken in his opposition to illegal dirt bikes and ATVs on the streets of Philadelphia. He has said that they terrorize pedestrians, drive recklessly and cause noise pollution. Brown has called for legislation to be passed that will permit the police to capture and destroy illegal dirt bikes. He supports developing vacant land into a suitable area for dirt bike and ATV use.

=== LGTBQ+ issues ===
Brown voted against a bill in the State House that would have prohibited transgender athletes from participating in the sport of their identifying gender.

Brown also voted against legislation that would require transgender youth to use the bathrooms of their assigned gender. He has also expressed support for gender affirming care conducted at the Children's Hospital of Philadelphia.

In a show of support for drag queens, Brown and several other 2023 Philadelphia mayoral candidates participated in a photo-op with Philadelphia drag performers.

== Personal life ==
Brown has two children.

=== Financial issues ===
In 2014, Brown was implicated in deed fraud when he purchased a property at 2312 Reed Street for $15,000 cash from owner Norman Johnson who had been deceased for over a decade. Johnson's rightful heirs reacquired the property in court after a judge nullified the forged deed. He faced criminal charges, which were eventually dropped. Brown defended his actions saying he was a victim of a Craigslist scam.

A year later, Brown was sued for $26,000 in a breach of contract lawsuit. Brown signed a contract to renovate a house in North Philadelphia but "completely failed to perform certain aspects of the work or performed the work negligently" according to the lawsuit. In 2021, the City of Philadelphia sued Brown for $30,000 in unpaid taxes and liens.

In a 2023 article in The Philadelphia Inquirer, Jeffrey Brooks Jr., a former business associate of Brown, accused him of only paying back $23,000 of a $50,000 loan.

== Electoral history ==
2019 Pennsylvania House of Representatives special election, District 190
Party	Candidate	Votes	%
Democratic	Movita Johnson-Harrell	3,188	66.6
Amen Brown Party	Amen Brown	958	20.0
Working Families	Pamela K. Williams	511	10.7
Republican	Michael Harvey	129	2.7
Total votes		4,786	100.0

2020 Pennsylvania House of Representatives Democratic primary election, District 190
Party	Candidate	Votes	%
Democratic	Amen Brown	5,996	43.0
Democratic	G. Roni Green (incumbent)	5,406	38.8
Democratic	Danyl Patterson	1,843	13.2
Democratic	Van Stone	662	4.8
Write-in		28	0.2
Total votes		13,935	100.0

2020 Pennsylvania House of Representatives election, District 190
Party	Candidate	Votes	%
Democratic	Amen Brown	27,869	94.6
Republican	Wanda Logan	1,555	5.3
Write-in		42	0.1
Total votes		29,466	100.0

2022 Pennsylvania House of Representatives Democratic primary election, District 10
Party	Candidate	Votes	%
Democratic	Amen Brown	3,064	39.8
Democratic	Cass Green	2,881	37.5
Democratic	Sajda Blackwell	1,714	22.3
Write-in		30	0.4
Total votes		7,689	100.0

2022 Pennsylvania House of Representatives election, District 10
Party	Candidate	Votes	%
Democratic	Amen Brown	15,874	99.0
Write-in		157	1.0
Total votes		16,031	100.0

2023 Philadelphia mayoral Democratic primary election
Party	Candidate	Votes	%
Democratic	Cherelle Parker	81,080	32.7
Democratic	Rebecca Rhynhart	56,581	22.8
Democratic	Helen Gym	54,705	22.0
Democratic	Allan Domb	28,051	11.3
Democratic	Jeff Brown	21,868	8.8
Democratic	Amen Brown	3,321	1.3
Democratic	James DeLeon	1,488	0.6
Democratic	Delscia Gray	582	0.2
Democratic	Warren Bloom	499	0.2
Write-in		163	<0.1
Total votes		248,288	100.0

2024 Pennsylvania House of Representatives Democratic primary election, District 10
Party	Candidate	Votes	%
Democratic	Amen Brown (incumbent)	2,991	40.1
Democratic	Cass Green	2,947	39.5
Democratic	Sajda Blackwell	1,496	20.1
Write-in		25	0.3
Total votes		7,459	100.0

2024 Pennsylvania House of Representatives election, District 10
Party	Candidate	Votes	%
Democratic	Amen Brown (incumbent)	22,919	98.7
Write-in		294	1.3
Total votes		23,213	100.0

Pennsylvania House of Representatives
Preceded by G. Roni Green	Member of the Pennsylvania House of Representatives from the 190th district 2021–2022	Succeeded by G. Roni Green
Preceded by Aaron Bernstine	Member of the Pennsylvania House of Representatives from the 10th district 2023–present	Incumbent
