= Aaron Bernstine =

American politician

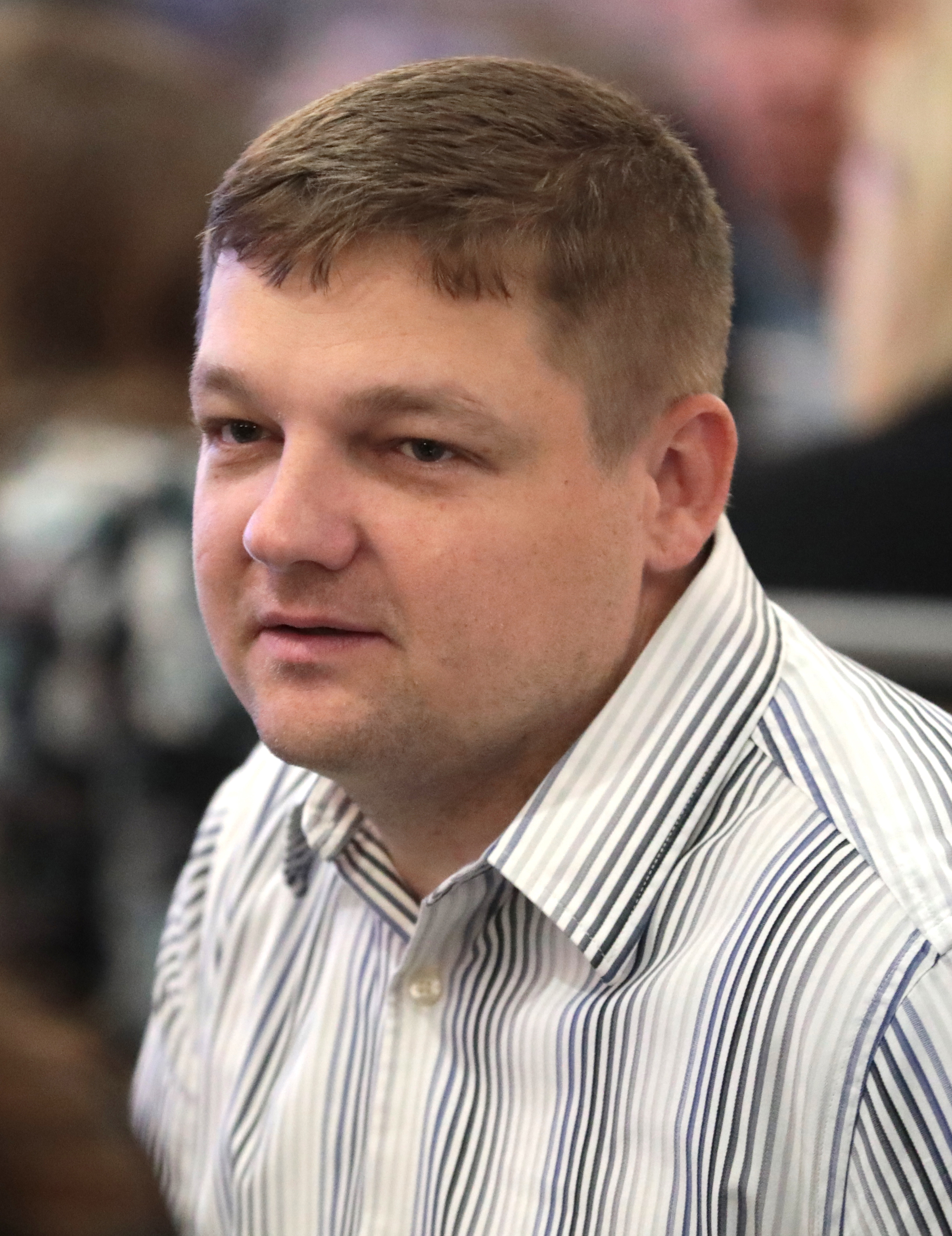
- Bernstine in 2022

Member of the Pennsylvania House of Representatives
- Incumbent
- Assumed office January 3, 2017
- Preceded by: Jaret Gibbons
- Constituency: 10th district (2017-2022); 8th district (2023-present)

Personal details
- Born: Aaron Joseph Bernstine; July 2, 1984 (age 42) Pennsylvania, U.S.
- Party: Republican
- Spouse: Ilia
- Children: 1
- Education: Pennsylvania State University (BS); University of Pittsburgh (MBA)
- Website: Official website

Aaron Joseph Bernstine (born July 2, 1984) is an American politician who serves in the Pennsylvania House of Representatives from the 8th District as a member of the Republican Party. Prior to redistricting he served from the 10th district.

== Early life and education ==
Aaron Joseph Bernstine was born on July 2, 1984. He graduated from Union Area High School in 2003, from Pennsylvania State University with a bachelor’s degree in business management in 2006, and from the University of Pittsburgh with a master of business administration in 2013. He worked as a part-time adjunct at the University of Pittsburgh.

== State legislature ==
=== Elections ===
Bernstine won the Republican nomination for a seat in the Pennsylvania House of Representatives from the 10th district against Dawnlyn Valli and Clifford Glovier. He defeated incumbent Democratic Representative Jaret Gibbons in the general election. Bernstine stated that he would only serve four terms in the state house. He won the Democratic nomination in the 2018 election through a write-in candidacy. He defeated Green nominee Darcelle Slappy in the general election. Bernstine defeated Democratic nominee Kolbe Cole and United nominee Johnathan Peffer in the 2020 election.

Following redistricting in 2021, Bernstine was moved from the 10th District to the 8th District. He defeated John Kennedy and Eric Ditullio for the Republican nomination and won without opposition in the 2022 election.

=== Tenure ===
During Bernstine's tenure in the state house he has served on the Commerce, Game and Fisheries, Health, and Insurance committees. He is a member of the Pennsylvania Freedom Caucus.

Bernstine was criticized for a Snapchat video he posted of his five-year old son smoking a cigar and swearing. Speaker Bryan Cutler and Majority Leader Kerry Benninghoff stated that they were "disgusted" by the video and called for his resignation. The Republican caucus in the state house also called for his resignation. The Republican Committee of Beaver County revoked its endorsement of him in response to the video.

== Political positions ==
Bernstine is anti-abortion. Bernstine and twenty-five Republican members of the state house signed a letter calling for district attorneys to not prosecute COVID-19 shutdown violations. He voted against legislation to raise the minimum age to buy tobacco from 18 to 21. Bernstine stated that Donald Trump was not at fault for the attack on the United States Capitol.

In 2020, Bernstine was among 26 Republicans in the state house who called for the reversal of Joe Biden's certification as the winner of Pennsylvania's electoral votes in the 2020 United States presidential election, citing false claims of election irregularities. He proposed legislation to remove Biden from the ballot in Pennsylvania in the 2024 election.

Bernstine voted in favor of legislation to prohibit transgender women from participating in women's sports in public schools. He proposed legislation to prohibit people under eighteen from attending drag shows.

Bernstine has a lifetime rating of 88% from the American Conservative Union. He has a lifetime rating of 4% from the Sierra Club. He received an A+ rating from the NRA Political Victory Fund. He signed onto the U.S. Term Limits pledge.

== Electoral history ==
2016 Pennsylvania House of Representatives 10th district election
Primary election
| Party | Candidate | Votes | % |
|---|---|---|---|
| Republican | Aaron Bernstine | 5,181 | 74.57% |
| Republican | Dawnlyn Valli | 1,141 | 16.42% |
| Republican | Clifford Glovier | 626 | 9.01% |
| Total votes | | 6,948 | 100.00% |
General election
| Republican | Aaron Bernstine | 15,807 | 58.48% |
| Democratic | Jaret Gibbons (incumbent) | 11,224 | 41.52% |
| Total votes | | 27,031 | 100.00% |

2018 Pennsylvania House of Representatives 10th district election
Primary election
| Party | Candidate | Votes | % |
|---|---|---|---|
| Republican | Aaron Bernstine (incumbent) | 3,045 | 100.00% |
| Total votes | | 3,045 | 100.00% |
General election
| Republican | Aaron Bernstine (incumbent) | | |
| Democratic | Aaron Bernstine (incumbent) | | |
| Total | Aaron Bernstine (incumbent) | 16,090 | 78.19% |
| Green | Darcelle Slappy | 4,487 | 21.81% |
| Total votes | | 20,577 | 100.00% |

2020 Pennsylvania House of Representatives 10th district election
Primary election
| Party | Candidate | Votes | % |
|---|---|---|---|
| Republican | Aaron Bernstine (incumbent) | 5,454 | 100.00% |
| Total votes | | 5,454 | 100.00% |
General election
| Republican | Aaron Bernstine (incumbent) | 15,009 | 51.50% |
| Democratic | Kolbe Cole | 10,032 | 34.43% |
| United | Johnathan Peffer | 4,100 | 14.07% |
| Total votes | | 29,141 | 100.00% |

2022 Pennsylvania House of Representatives 8th district election
Primary election
| Party | Candidate | Votes | % |
|---|---|---|---|
| Republican | Aaron Bernstine (incumbent) | 5,826 | 49.05% |
| Republican | John Kennedy | 4,887 | 41.15% |
| Republican | Eric Ditullio | 1,164 | 9.80% |
| Total votes | | 11,877 | 100.00% |
General election
| Republican | Aaron Bernstine (incumbent) | 25,702 | 100.00% |
| Total votes | | 25,702 | 100.00% |

Pennsylvania House of Representatives
| Preceded by Jaret Gibbons | Member of the Pennsylvania House of Representatives from the 10th district 2017–2022 | Succeeded by Amen Brown |
| Preceded by Timothy R. Bonner | Member of the Pennsylvania House of Representatives from the 8th district 2023–present | Incumbent |
