= Vanessa L. Brown =

American politician (born 1965)

Vanessa Lowery Brown

Member of the Pennsylvania House of Representatives from the 190th district
- In office January 6, 2009 – December 11, 2018
- Preceded by: Thomas Blackwell
- Succeeded by: Movita Johnson-Harrell

Personal details
- Born: Vanessa Lowery Brown; December 16, 1965 (age 60) Philadelphia, Pennsylvania
- Party: Democratic
- Education: Howard University

Vanessa Lowery Brown (born December 16, 1965) is a former Democratic member of the Pennsylvania House of Representatives from the 190th District. She is a member of the Pennsylvania Legislative Black Caucus. In 2018 she was convicted on seven charges related to a bribery case, six of which were felonies. She was sentenced to 23 months probation for her crimes. In 2023, Brown became employed in the office of the Philadelphia Register of Wills.

== Background ==
Brown attended Philadelphia High School for Girls, graduating in 1984. She then studied at the Community College of Philadelphia followed by Howard University. She is single.

== Bribery case ==
On 31 October 2018 Brown was convicted on seven charges stemming relating to bribery. She was found guilty of five felony counts of violating the state conflict-of-interest law, a felony count of bribery, and a further misdemeanor count relating to failure to report payments. The charges resulted from a sting operation which was controversially shut down by Democrat Pennsylvania Attorney General Kathleen Kane who had claimed the investigations could not produce cases that were winnable in court. On 30 November 2018 Brown was sentenced to 23 months probation for her crimes. Despite her bribery conviction, she refused to resign from her position. However, on 12 December, Brown resigned from her seat "under protest".

Brown was represented at trial by Patrick A. Casey, John B. Dempsey and Erik R. Anderson of the Scranton-based law firm, Myers, Brier & Kelly, LLP.
