= G. Roni Green =

American politician

Member of the Pennsylvania House of Representatives from the 190th district
- Incumbent
- Assumed office January 3, 2023
- Preceded by: Amen Brown
- In office March 26, 2020 – November 30, 2020
- Preceded by: Movita Johnson-Harrell
- Succeeded by: Amen Brown

Personal details
- Born: June 9, 1959 (age 67)
- Party: Democratic
- Education: Murrell Dobbins Vocational High School

Gwendolyn Veronica Green (born June 9, 1959) is an American politician. She is a member of the Pennsylvania House of Representatives representing the 190th District since 2023 and previously in 2020.

== Early life and education ==
Green was born on June 9, 1959. She graduated from Murrell Dobbins Vocational High School in 1977 and later attended George Meany Labor College.

== Political career ==
In February 2020, Green won a special election to fill the 190th District seat of Pennsylvania State Representative Movita Johnson-Harrell, who had pled guilty to charity theft in 2019. Green failed to win the 2020 general primary election, and was defeated by fellow Democrat Amen Brown. In 2022, Brown was redistricted to the 10th District. Green ran for the 190th seat again and won.

== Electoral history ==
Pennsylvania House of Representatives, District 190 2020 special election
Party	Candidate	Votes	%
Democratic	G. Roni Green	2,651	86.27
Republican	Wanda Logan	422	13.73
Total votes		3,073	100.00
Democratic hold			

2020 Pennsylvania House of Representatives Democratic primary election, District 190
Party	Candidate	Votes	%
Democratic	Amen Brown	5,996	43.03
Democratic	G. Roni Green (incumbent)	5,406	38.79
Democratic	Danyl Patterson	1,843	13.23
Democratic	Van Stone	662	4.75
Write-in		28	0.2
Total votes		13,935	100.00

2022 Pennsylvania House of Representatives election, District 190
Party	Candidate	Votes	%
Democratic	G. Roni Green	17,056	96.47
Independent	James Love Jackson	583	3.30
Write-in		41	0.23
Total votes		17,680	100.00
Democratic hold			

2024 Pennsylvania House of Representatives Democratic primary election, District 190
Party	Candidate	Votes	%
Democratic	G. Roni Green	4,786	66.99
Democratic	James Love Jackson	2,323	32.52
Write-in		35	0.49
Total votes		7,144	100.00

2024 Pennsylvania House of Representatives election, District 190
Party	Candidate	Votes	%
Democratic	G. Roni Green	24,492	99.67
Write-in		80	0.33
Total votes		24,572	100.00
