= Rosita Youngblood =

American politician (born 1946)

Rosita C. Youngblood

Member of the Pennsylvania House of Representatives from the 198th district
- In office April 19, 1994 – December 1, 2020
- Preceded by: Bob O'Donnell
- Succeeded by: Darisha Parker

Personal details
- Born: December 20, 1946 (age 79) Philadelphia, Pennsylvania, U.S.
- Party: Democratic
- Education: Antioch University

Rosita C. Youngblood (born December 20, 1946) is a former Democratic member of the Pennsylvania House of Representatives, representing the 198th District from 1994 until 2020. She was the first black woman to hold a position in Pennsylvania House leadership. She was elected to the House in a special election on April 5, 1994 to fill a vacancy. She held her seat until retirement in 2020.

== Ward leader ==
Youngblood was the Ward Leader of the 13th Ward Democratic Executive Committee for 34 years, elected in 1986.

== Negro Mountain ==
In July 2007, Youngblood called for the renaming of Negro Mountain. In a news release, she said, "Through a school project, my son and granddaughter first informed me of the name of this range and I found it to be disparaging that we have one of our great works of nature named as such… I find it disheartening for tourists who visit this range to see the plaque with the name Negro Mountain displayed on the mountainside."

On 1 August 2007, Youngblood and other lawmakers introduced House Resolution No. 378 resolving that the governor "form a commission …to study the naming of Negro Mountain and Mount Davis …[to] adopt names that accurately reflect the history of the region and the heroism displayed by the African American in the Negro Mountain conflict of 1756" and accordingly to alter "brochures, plaques and signs [to] accurately reflect the facts of this heroic historical event". (The 1921 naming of Mount Davis is now also considered controversial because it honors the white settler who once owned the land, rather than the colonial African-American.)
