= Jason Dawkins =

American politician

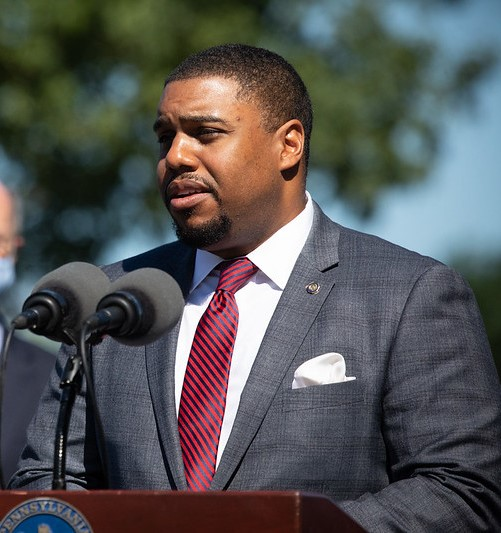

Member of the Pennsylvania House of Representatives from the 179th district
- Incumbent
- Assumed office January 6, 2015
- Preceded by: James Clay Jr.

Personal details
- Born: March 25, 1984 (age 42)
- Party: Democratic
- Occupation: Legislator

Jason Dawkins is a Democratic member of the Pennsylvania House of Representatives representing the 179th House district in Philadelphia, Pennsylvania. Dawkins is a member of the Pennsylvania Legislative Black Caucus.
