= Ben Sanchez (politician) =

American politician

Member of the Pennsylvania House of Representatives from the 153rd district
- Incumbent
- Assumed office January 1, 2019
- Preceded by: Madeleine Dean

Personal details
- Born: Benjamin V. Sanchez; March 11, 1975 (age 51) Abington Township, Montgomery County, Pennsylvania, U.S.
- Party: Democratic
- Education: Villanova University (BS); Temple University (JD)
- Website: State house website Campaign website

Benjamin V. Sanchez (born March 11, 1975) is an American attorney, accountant, and politician serving as a member of the Pennsylvania House of Representatives from the 153rd district. Elected in November 2018, he assumed office on December 1, 2018.

== Early life and education ==
Sanchez was born in Abington Township, Montgomery County, Pennsylvania. He earned a Bachelor of Science degree in accounting from Villanova University and a Juris Doctor from the Temple University Beasley School of Law.

== Career ==
Since graduating from law school, Sanchez has worked as a Certified Public Accountant and attorney. He was also an adjunct professor of law at the Thomas R. Kline School of Law. From 2014 to 2018, he was a member of the Abington Township Commission. He was elected to the Pennsylvania House of Representatives in November 2018 and assumed office on December 1, 2018. Sanchez currently sits on the Appropriations, Health, Local Government, and State Government committees.
