= Jack Rader =

American politician

Member of the Pennsylvania House of Representatives from the 176th district
- Incumbent
- Assumed office January 6, 2015
- Preceded by: Mario M. Scavello

Personal details
- Born: February 10, 1954 (age 72) Allentown, Pennsylvania, U.S.
- Party: Republican
- Spouse: Susan
- Children: 4
- Education: Susquehanna University
- Occupation: Resort manager
- Website: Campaign website

Jack B. Rader Jr. (born February 10, 1954) is a member of the Pennsylvania House of Representatives, representing the 176th House district in Monroe County, Pennsylvania.

He was born on February 10, 1954 in Allentown, Pennsylvania. In 1972, he graduated from Pocono Mountain High School and in 1976 from Susquehanna University with a bachelor's degree in business administration. For thirty years, he was manager and vice president of Mountain Springs Resort.

Rader's political career started as an elected supervisor of Jackson Township in Monroe County, of which he was chair for twenty years. He also served on the Pocono-Jackson Water Authority, Regional Planning Board, Open Space Commission, and Monroe County Council of Government prior to being elected to the Pennsylvania House of Representatives in 2014.
