= Peter Schweyer =

American politician

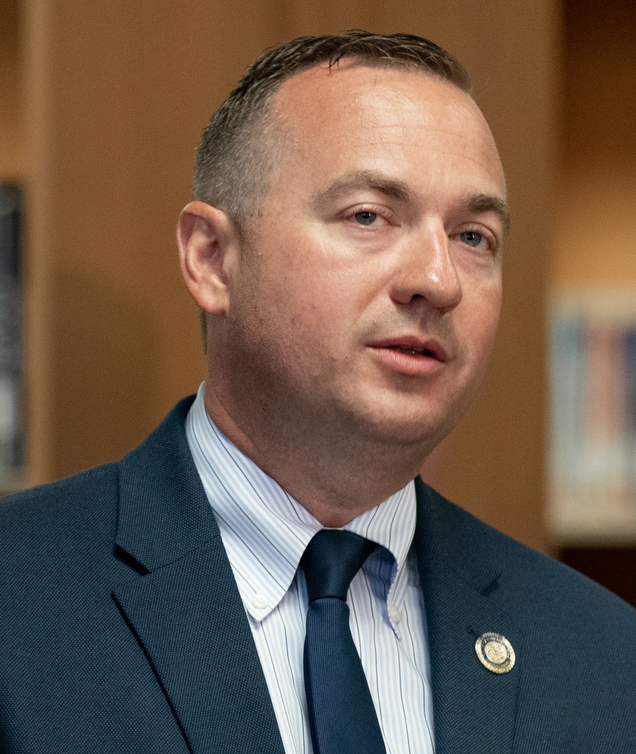

Member of the Pennsylvania House of Representatives
- Incumbent
- Assumed office January 6, 2015
- Preceded by: Erin Molchany
- Constituency: 22nd district (2015–2023); 134th district (2023–present)

Personal details
- Born: July 26, 1978 (age 48) Allentown, Pennsylvania, U.S.
- Party: Democratic
- Spouse: Jennifer
- Children: Sarah, Erin
- Education: Pennsylvania State University (BA)
- Occupation: State Legislator

Peter George Schweyer (born July 26, 1978) is a Democratic member of the Pennsylvania House of Representatives representing the 22nd House district in Lehigh County, Pennsylvania.

== Committee assignments ==
- Appropriations
- Committee On Committees
- Committee On Ethics
- Consumer Affairs
- Professional Licensure
