= Pennsylvania House of Representatives, District 190 =

American legislative district

Pennsylvania's 190th State House of Representatives district
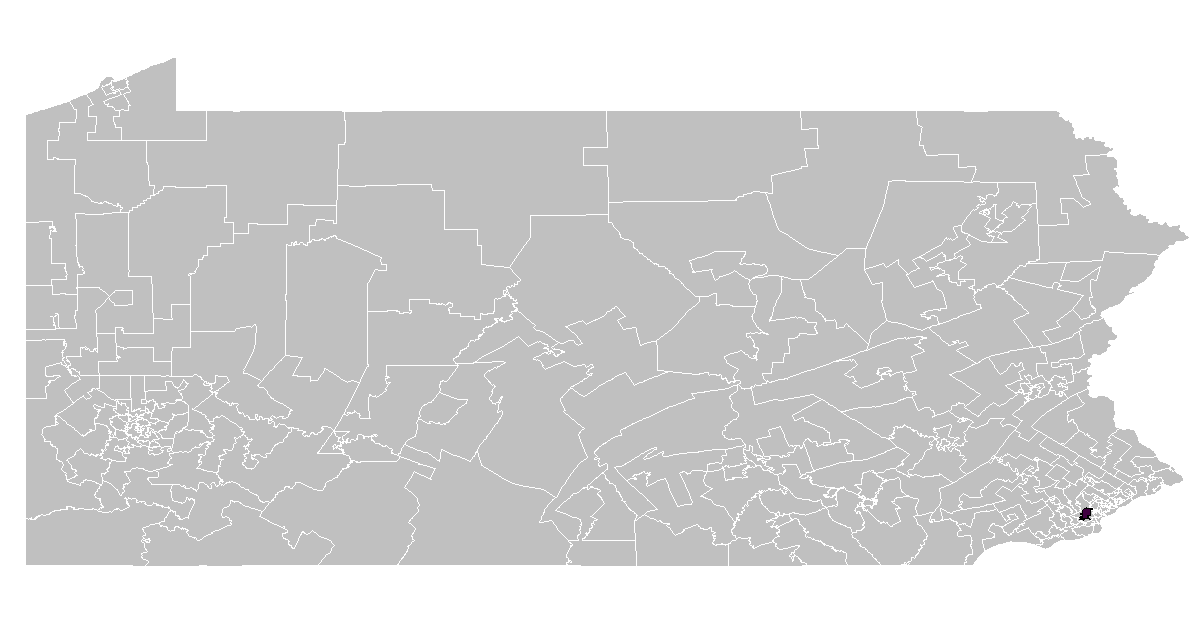
Representative
G. Roni Green; D–Philadelphia
- Demographics: 9.9% White; 83.4% Black; 2.5% Hispanic
- Population (2011) • Citizens of voting age: 62,703; 48,108

The 190th Pennsylvania House of Representatives District is located in southeast Pennsylvania and is currently represented by G. Roni Green.

== District profile ==
The 190th Pennsylvania House of Representatives District is located in Philadelphia County and encompasses the Belmont Mansion and Malcolm X Park in West Philadelphia. It also includes the following areas:

- Ward 04 [PART, Divisions 01, 07, 08, 12, 13, 19 and 20]
- Ward 06
- Ward 24 [PART, Divisions 06, 07, 08, 16 and 17]
- Ward 38 [PART, Division 09]
- Ward 44
- Ward 52 [PART, Divisions 01, 02, 03, 04, 06, 07, 08, 09, 10, 11, 12, 13, 21 and 28]
- Ward 60 [PART, Divisions 04, 05, 06, 08, 09, 10, 11, 12, 13, 14, 15, 16, 17, 18, 20 and 21]

== Representatives ==
Representative	Party	Years	District home	Note
Prior to 1969, seats were apportioned by county.
James Barber	Democrat	1969 – 1986		
Vincent Hughes	Democrat	1987 – 1994		
Mike Horsey	Democrat	1995 – 2004		Removed from ballot
Thomas W. Blackwell	Democrat	2007 – 2008		Removed from ballot
Vanessa L. Brown	Democrat	2009 – 2019		Resigned after being convicted
Movita Johnson-Harrell	Democrat	2019		Resigned after being convicted
G. Roni Green	Democrat	2020 – 2021		Lost renomination
Amen Brown	Democrat	2021 – 2023		Redistricted to 10th District
G. Roni Green	Democrat	2023 – present		

== Recent election results ==
PA House election, 2010: Pennsylvania House, District 190
Party	Candidate	Votes	%
Democratic	Vanessa L. Brown (incumbent)	Unopposed	
Total votes		17,895	100.0
Democratic hold			

PA House election, 2012: Pennsylvania House, District 190
Party	Candidate	Votes	%
Democratic	Vanessa L. Brown (incumbent)	Unopposed	
Total votes		27,617	100.0
Democratic hold			

PA House election, 2014: Pennsylvania House, District 190
Party	Candidate	Votes	%
Democratic	Vanessa L. Brown (incumbent)	16,446	95.73
Republican	Glenn Davis	734	4.27
Total votes		17,180	100.0
Democratic hold			

PA House election, 2016: Pennsylvania House, District 190
Party	Candidate	Votes	%
Democratic	Vanessa L. Brown (incumbent)	Unopposed	
Total votes		28,620	100.0
Democratic hold			

PA House election, 2018: Pennsylvania House, District 190
Party	Candidate	Votes	%
Democratic	Vanessa L. Brown (incumbent)	Unopposed	
Total votes		22,644	100.0
Democratic hold			

PA House special election, 2019: Pennsylvania House, District 190
Party	Candidate	Votes	%
Democratic	Movita Johnson-Harrell	3,188	66.61
Independent	Amen Brown	958	20.02
Working Families	Pamela K. Williams	511	10.68
Republican	Michael Harvey	129	2.70
Total votes		4,786	100.00
Democratic hold			

PA House special election, 2020: Pennsylvania House, District 190
Party	Candidate	Votes	%
Democratic	G. Roni Green	2,651	86.27
Republican	Wanda Logan	422	13.73
Total votes		3,073	100.00
Democratic hold			

PA House election, 2020: Democratic Primary, District 190
Party	Candidate	Votes	%
Democratic	Amen Brown	5,996	43.11
Democratic	G. Roni Green (incumbent)	5,406	38.87
Democratic	Danyl S. Patterson	1,843	13.25
Democratic	Samuel Downing	662	4.76
Total votes		13,907	100.00

PA House election, 2020: General Election, District 190
Party	Candidate	Votes	%
Democratic	Amen Brown	27,869	94.72
Republican	Wanda Logan	1,555	5.28
Total votes		29,424	100.00
Democratic hold			
