= Movita Johnson-Harrell =

American politician (born 1966)

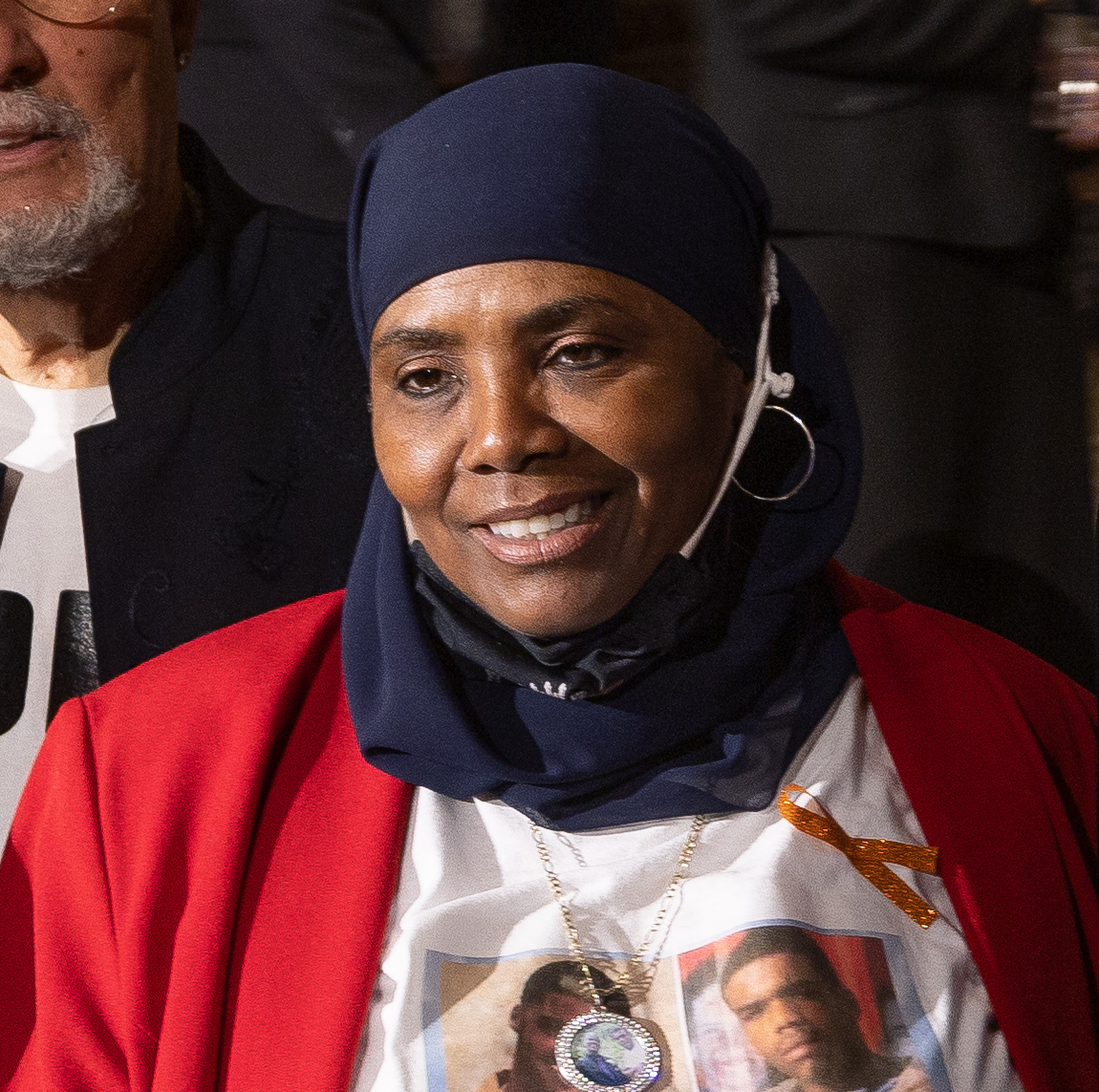

Member of the Pennsylvania House of Representatives from the 190th district
- In office March 25, 2019 – December 13, 2019
- Preceded by: Vanessa Lowery Brown
- Succeeded by: G. Roni Green

Personal details
- Born: Movita Johnson-Harrell; April 21, 1966 (age 60)
- Party: Democratic
- Education: University of Pennsylvania
- Occupation: Politician
- Criminal information
- Status: on parole
- Convictions: perjury, tampering with public records, theft by unlawful taking and theft by deception and contributions of corporations

Movita Johnson-Harrell (born April 21, 1966) is an American politician from Pennsylvania who served as a Democratic member of the Pennsylvania House of Representatives for the 190th district from March to December 2019. She was the first female Muslim member of the Pennsylvania House of Representatives.

She resigned after pleading guilty to various criminal acts related to a charity she worked for. She was sentenced to 3 months in jail followed by 8.5 months on house arrest, 11 months on parole, and 2 years probation.

== Early life and education ==
Johnson-Harrell was raised in poverty in a family that suffered from generations of substance abuse. She received support from welfare and lived in public housing. She earned an associate's degree in behavioral health in 1999. She also earned a bachelor's degree in applied science in 2002 and a master's degree in social work from the University of Pennsylvania in 2004.

== Career ==
Johnson-Harrell worked as supervisor of victim services for the Philadelphia District Attorney's office. She is the founder of the CHARLES Foundation (Creating Healthy Alternatives Results in Less Emotional Suffering) which was established in 2011 after the mistaken identity shooting death of her 18-year-old son, Charles André Johnson. The CHARLES foundation is focused on improving the lives of young people, their neighborhoods and "common-sense" gun control legislation to reduce violence.

== Pennsylvania House of Representatives ==
Johnson-Harrell was elected to the Pennsylvania House of Representatives for the 190th district on March 12, 2019 during a special election held after Vanessa Lowery Brown resigned due to her conviction on corruption and bribery charges. She was sworn into office on March 25, 2019. During her swearing in, she made headlines after state Representative Stephanie Borowicz made a Christian prayer that invoked Jesus 13 times, praised Trump, praised Israel, and said, "God forgive us — Jesus — we’ve lost sight of you, we’ve forgotten you, God, in our country, and we’re asking you to forgive us, Jesus." Johnson-Harrel criticized this as "weaponized prayer" and as an example of Islamophobia.

== Criminal charges ==
In December 2019, Johnson-Harrell pled guilty to charges of perjury, tampering with public records, theft by unlawful taking and theft by deception and contributions of corporations related to her personal use of $500,000 over the course of a decade from a non-profit organization Motivation Education and Consultation Associates. She announced that she would resign from the Pennsylvania House of Representatives due to these charges. In August 2020, Johnson-Harrell was released from prison to begin serving house arrest.

Pennsylvania House of Representatives
Preceded by Vanessa Lowery Brown	Member of the Pennsylvania House of Representatives for the 190th district 2019	Succeeded by Roni Green
