= Darisha Parker =

American politician (born 1975)

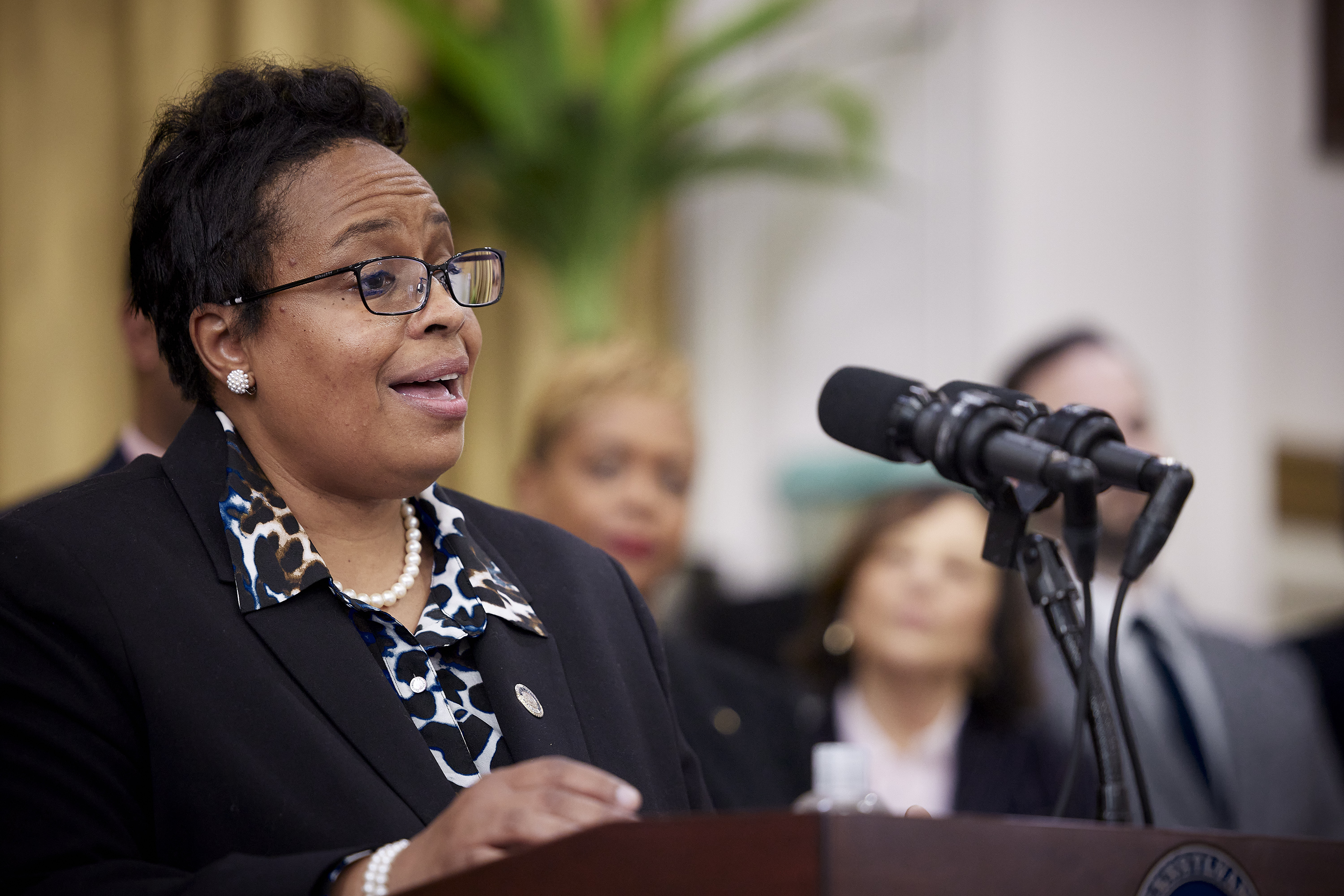

Member of the Pennsylvania House of Representatives from the 198th district
- Incumbent
- Assumed office December 1, 2020
- Preceded by: Rosita Youngblood

Personal details
- Born: 1975 (age 50–51)
- Party: Democratic
- Education: Bennett College (BA)

Darisha K. Parker (born 1975) is an American politician serving as a member of the Pennsylvania House of Representatives from the 198th district.

Elected in November 2020, she assumed office on December 1, 2020.

== Education ==
Parker graduated from Lankenau Environmental Science Magnet High School and earned a Bachelor of Arts degree from Bennett College.

== Career ==
Parker worked as a legislative assistant for Rosita Youngblood. She was elected to the Pennsylvania House of Representatives in November 2020 and assumed office on December 1, 2020, succeeding Youngblood.
