= Redistricting in Pennsylvania =

Redistricting in Pennsylvania refers to the decennial process of redrawing state legislative and federal congressional districts in the U.S. state of Pennsylvania.

== United States congressional redistricting ==
=== 2001–2011 ===
Before the 2000 election, the Pennsylvania House of Representatives was evenly split with 100 members from the Republican and Democratic parties and 3 vacancies. After the 2000 election, there were 104 Republican house seats and 99 Democratic seats. Republicans also maintained control of the Pennsylvania State Senate, with 30 Republican seats and 20 Democratic seats. Republicans also controlled the Pennsylvania governorship. This would ensure the 2000 census redistricting process was led by the Republican-controlled Pennsylvania General Assembly. Following the 2000 census, Pennsylvania Republicans would have full state control of the redistricting process.

Pennsylvania Senate Bill 1200 was introduced by Republican State Senators Brightbill and Lemmond on November 16, 2001. On December 10, 2001, the Senate considered amendments to Senate Bill 1200. A Republican amendment was ultimately agreed to. The version of Senate Bill 1200 that eventually passed the Senate contained a population deviation of twenty-four persons. After an amendment by the Pennsylvania House of Representatives, that chamber passed Senate Bill 1200 on December 12, 2001. The version of Senate Bill 1200 that passed the House had a total population deviation of nineteen persons. It also maintained two minority-majority districts in the Philadelphia area, created one open seat in the southeastern part of the Commonwealth and paired two Democratic incumbents in the same district. One Democratic incumbent was paired against one Republican incumbent. The Senate refused to concur in the amendments to Senate Bill 1200 offered by the House of Representatives. A Conference Committee was appointed and a plan was eventually devised that contained a nineteen-person deviation. This Conference Committee Report on Senate Bill 1200 was passed by the Senate on January 3, 2002 and by the House of Representatives later the same day. It was signed into law by Governor Mark Schweiker on January 7, 2002.

==== Vieth v. Jubelirer ====
In Vieth v. Jubelirer, a United States Supreme Court case challenging the constitutionality of the 2000 redistricting process, the Supreme Court was unable to agree upon a legal standard for judging when partisan gerrymandering violated the United States Constitution.

==== Effects ====
After the 2000 elections, Pennsylvania Republicans held a slim 11 to 10 congressional seat majority over the Democrats. In the 2002 Pennsylvania House of Representatives elections:

- Republicans expanded their majority in House of Representatives in Pennsylvania, winning 12 seats to the Democrats 7 seats.
- After the 2000 U.S. census, Pennsylvania lost two congressional districts: Pennsylvania's 20th and 21st congressional districts. Republican Phil English, U.S. Representative of the 21st congressional district, would later be redistricted to 3rd congressional district, where he won reelection. Democratic Frank Mascara, U.S. Representative of the 21st congressional district, was redistricted to the 18th congressional district, but moved to and lost renomination in the 12th congressional district to fellow Democratic Representative John Murtha.
- In the newly redrawn 6th congressional district, Republican Jim Gerlach won the seat for the Republicans, after Democratic Representative Tim Holden was redistricted from the 17th congressional district, where he won reelection. Democratic Representative Robert Borski was redistricted from the 3rd congressional district, to the 6th congressional district, but retired from Congress.
- Democrat Mike Doyle, U.S. Representative for 18th congressional district, would later be redistricted to 3rd congressional district, where he won reelection unopposed.

This would be maintained until the 2006 Democratic wave election, when Democrats won 11 of the 19 elections for the United States House of Representatives.

=== 2011–2021 ===
==== Congressional districts drawn in 2011 ====
In the 2010 Pennsylvania elections, Republicans won a landslide victory, with Tom Corbett winning the 2010 Pennsylvania gubernatorial election, recapturing the Pennsylvania House of Representatives, and regained their majority in House of Representatives in Pennsylvania, winning 12 seats to the Democrat's 7 seats. Following the 2010 census, Pennsylvania Republicans would have full state control of the redistricting process for the second decade in a row.

On September 14, 2011, Republican senate leadership introduced a congressional redistricting bill which contained neither a map nor description of proposed congressional district lines. The proposed lines were added in the senate State Government Committee on December 13, 2011. The committee approved the bill 6-5 along party lines. Breaking with his party, Republican Sen. Mike Folmer opposed the Republican bill, saying "all you have to do is look at (the map)" to see it appeared to be specifically drawn to dilute Democratic votes and was the perfect example of why redistricting reform is needed. Barry Kauffman, lobbyist for Common Cause of Pennsylvania, agreed with Folmer, saying the plan "is a clear-cut case of politicians picking their voters in order to prevent voters from having a meaningful opportunity to pick their elected officials".

On December 14, 2011, the bill returned to the senate, which passed it the following day. Prior to senate passage, senate Democrats proposed an amendment to use a different map. Advocating for the change, Democratic Senator Vincent Hughes argued that under both plans, the Democrats could only count on four districts, but the Republicans would go from 12 safe districts to eight. In the Republican plan two districts would be "swing" districts, but the Democrats' plan would have six. This amendment was defeated on a party line vote. The Senate voted to approve the new map by a 26–24 vote on December 14, 2011. The map then went to the House, who approved it 136–61 on December 20, 2011. The House vote was less partisan, with 36 Democrats voting for the redistricting map and 8 Republicans voting against it. Democrats introduced their own map as an amendment, but the amendment failed. Pennsylvania Democratic Chairman Jim Burn issued a press release, stating, "The Republicans have proposed a map far more partisan and gerrymandered than anyone would have guessed, a map that they will now force into law without any public input."

Corbett signed the new map into law on December 22, 2011.

The map drew Democratic Reps. Jason Altmire and Mark Critz into the same district while putting six Republicans into safer districts.

==== 2018: League of Women Voters v. Commonwealth ====
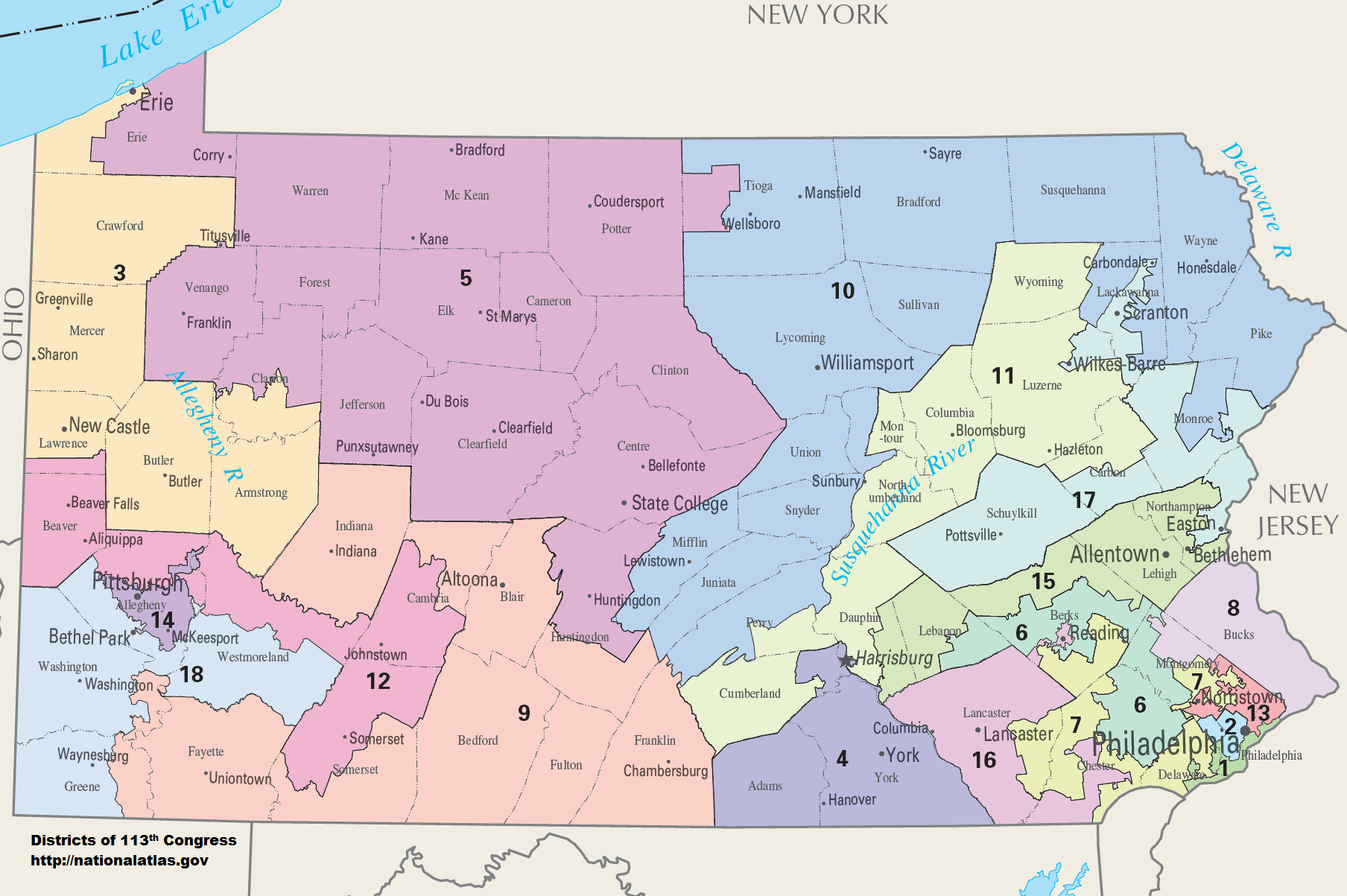
Congressional district map (2011–2017)

Court-mandated districts for (2018–2020) elections

On June 14, 2017, the League of Women Voters of Pennsylvania filed a lawsuit, alleging that the existing congressional district lines were unconstitutionally gerrymandered to favor the Republican Party. In a short order on January 22, 2018, the Pennsylvania Supreme Court struck down the existing map, saying it "clearly, plainly and palpably" violated the state constitution. After the deadline for the General Assembly to submit a new plan to the governor expired, the Court released a new congressional map to take effect for the May 15, 2018 primaries.

== State legislative redistricting ==
=== 2011–2021 ===
On August 17, 2011, the Legislative Reapportionment Commission unanimously approved the census data and voted to go ahead with the redistricting process. This officially began the 90-day period allotted to the commission to introduce a preliminary map. Commission members identified 129 precincts where precinct lines and census data may not match up, but they decided to correct the errors as they went rather than wait any longer.

The LRC held a meeting on October 31, 2011 where it took up a vote on new legislative district maps. Voting 3-2 along party lines, the panel passed a preliminary Republican proposal that moved seats from west to east. House seats would be added in Allentown, Berks County, Chester County and York County, while eliminating existing districts in Erie and Philadelphia and Allegheny County.

Democrats attacked the plan as partisan, expressing hope that the plan would change prior to adoption. Rep. Gregory Vitali (D) stated, "It seems what this process has been about is incumbency protection, not about the best welfare of communities." Republicans called their plan fair, stressing that the overwhelming loss of population in the west came from Democratic districts, and thus their map was simply an accurate reflection of population changes.

Democrats were also critical of the negotiating process. House Minority Leader Frank Dermody lividly complained that Republicans didn't share their proposed plan until Monday. Dermody said, "And my guess is clearly that my colleague had a significant more amount time to review the plan. Frankly, I look at is as a classic bait and switch."

Majority Leader Dominic Pileggi's office released a revised map of state senate districts on December 7, 2011. According to Pileggi's press release, the new plan "incorporates more than 150 requests made by Senate Democratic Leader Jay Costa" and "modifies 25 Senate districts from the Preliminary Plan".

==== Maps approved ====
By a 4–1 vote the Legislative Reapportionment Commission approved new Senate and House maps on December 12, 2011. No further action was required to implement the districts for 2012, but there was a 30-day period to file appeals with the state Supreme Court. One district in the Senate and five in the House were moved from the western part of the state to the east. Senate Minority Leader Jay Costa (D) initially said Democrats had not decided whether they would appeal, but during the first week of January 2012 he said an appeal would be forthcoming.

==== Appeals ====
The court received at least 11 appeals by the January 11, 2012 deadline. The broadest appeal came from the Senate Democrats, arguing against plans to move a Senate district from the southwestern portion of the state to the northeast, move Harrisburg out of its present district, and splits to multiple counties and municipalities. Another major appeal was made by Michael Churchill, a lawyer at The Public Interest Law Center of Philadelphia, on behalf of 13 citizens. He argued that counties and towns were unnecessarily divided in order to include the homes of incumbents.

==== Maps thrown out ====
After hearing arguments on January 23, 2012, the state Supreme Court threw out the maps two days later by a vote of 4–3. Calling the redistricting approach "contrary to law," the court ruled current district lines would stay in place until the Legislative Reapportionment Commission could devise a plan that was legal. With the signature filing deadline for state legislative candidates quickly approaching on February 14, the 2012 elections could have taken place in districts that were drawn in 2001.

The court rendered their full opinion on February 3, 2012. Ronald Castille said most appeals were rejected for only showing how a particular region was drawn unconstitutional, but cited two as having a big picture focus and showing how the whole map could be drawn better. One was submitted by Senate Democrats and the other came from Amanda Holt, a 29-year-old piano teacher and Republican committeewoman. The court said Holt's map proved the Legislative Redistricting Commission failed to meet the criteria that municipalities and wards should only be split if absolutely necessary. She initially showed her map to the commission at a hearing on September 7, 2011, but they went on to release a map that had more than twice as many splits as hers did.

==== Commission meeting, delays ====
The Legislative Reapportionment Commission met on February 22, 2012, but did not hold a vote. The next meeting was scheduled for February 28, 2012. but the day before it was announced that the meeting had been rescheduled for March 2 without giving a reason why. On March 1 it was announced, again without a stated reason, that the meeting would be rescheduled, but a new date was not given.

On March 8, 2012, Commission chairman Stephen McEwen said talks had been "far from productive" and so it would be pointless to hold a meeting the following week, but that he hoped there would be a vote by March 19.

The next meeting was set for April 12, 2012. While leaders did not say there was new deal, they were expecting a new preliminary plan to be voted on.

==== New map approved by LRC ====
On April 12, 2012, the Legislative Reapportionment Commission finally met, voting 4–1 in favor of a compromise proposal put forth by chairman Stephen McEwen. The revised plan addressed municipality splits, with the new Senate map containing only two split between districts while the House map has 68. The initial maps that were rejected by the court had 108 municipal splits.

The commission met on May 2, 2012 to take public comments and had until May 14 to decide whether or not to approve the maps. If approved, they would be in effect starting in 2013 and be used in the 2014 elections.

The LRC voted 4–1 on June 8, 2012 to approve the final plan. The plan, which was drawn up by Republican members, was sent to the Pennsylvania Supreme Court. Before the court could sign off on the map, citizens had 30 days to file a complaint.

In the 2012 state election in Pennsylvania, the old 2000 census legislative borders were used in the election.

In May 2013, the Pennsylvania Supreme Court, in a 6–0 ruling, approved of the new LRC state redistricting plan. The new redistricting borders went into effect in the 2014 state election in Pennsylvania.

=== 2021–2031 ===
==== Members ====
The 2021 Legislative Reapportionment Commission consisted of the following members after the Supreme Court of Pennsylvania appointed a Chairman to break a deadlock of the legislative leaders.

Member	Title
Mark Nordenberg	Chairman
Kim Ward	Senate Republican Leader
Jay Costa	Senate Democratic Leader
Kerry Benninghoff	House Republican Leader
Joanna McClinton	House Democratic Leader

2021 was the first time a woman (Ward and McClinton) and a person of color (McClinton) had ever served on the LRC, and the first time a member (Costa) had served on two consecutive commissions. Chairman Nordenberg currently serves as Chair of Pitt's Institute of Politics and Director of its Dick Thornburgh Forum for Law & Public Policy and holds the special faculty rank of Distinguished Service Professor of Law. He is a registered Democrat, effectively making the LRC a 3-2 Democratic majority.

==== Redistricting process ====
On August 24, 2021, the Legislative Reapportionment Commission voted 3–2 to end prison gerrymandering by counting incarcerated state prisoners as residing in the districts where they originally lived, as opposed to where they're incarcerated. However, on September 21, the effort was scaled back slightly when the LRC voted 3–2 to carve out an exception for those prisoners serving sentences that will end after the 2030 census.

On October 25, 2021, the LRC approved the 2020 census data and voted to go ahead with the redistricting process. This officially began the 90-day period allotted to the commission to introduce a preliminary map. The commission also invited citizens to submit their own proposed maps for consideration through software like Dave's Redistricting and DistrictBuilder.

The LRC held a meeting on December 16, 2021, where it voted 5–0 on a proposed State Senate map, and 3–2 on a proposed State House map. Republican state officials objected to what they perceived to be gerrymandering favoring Democrats, particularly in and around the collar counties of Philadelphia. Public comment was received through January 18, 2022 for final consideration of the State House map.

== See also ==
- Redistricting
- Political party strength in Pennsylvania
- Pennsylvania General Assembly
- Politics of Pennsylvania
- Elections in Pennsylvania
- 2020 United States census
- 2020 United States redistricting cycle
