= Pennsylvania House of Representatives, District 179 =

American legislative district

Pennsylvania's 179th State House of Representatives district
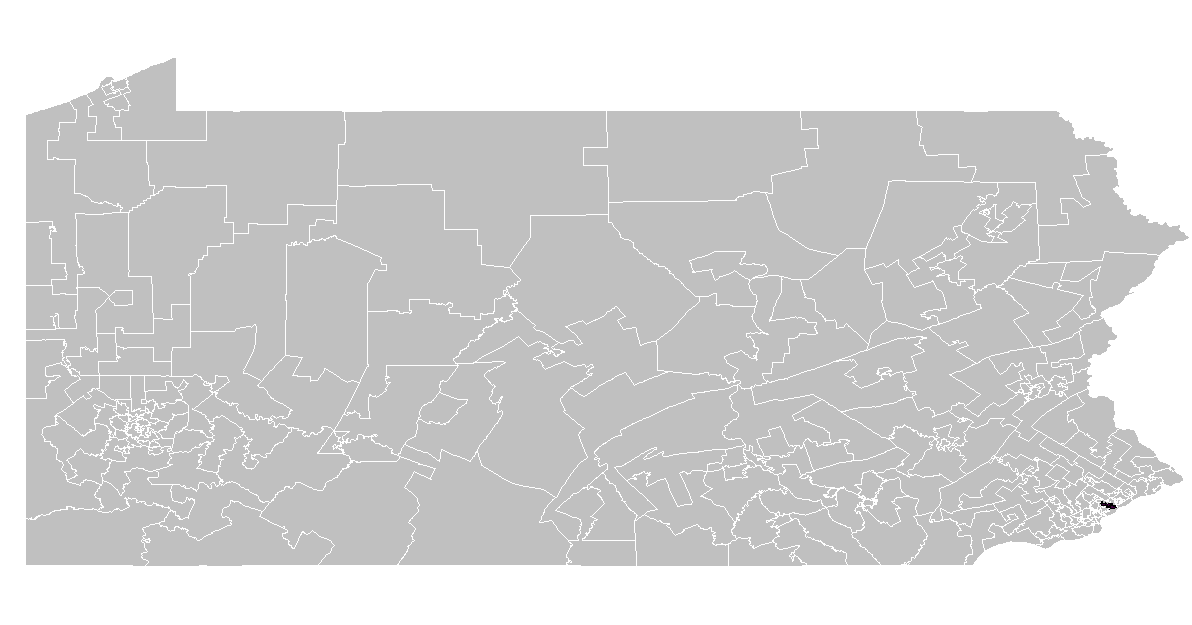
Representative
Jason Dawkins; D–Philadelphia

The 179th Pennsylvania House of Representatives District is located in Philadelphia County and includes the following areas:

- Ward 23 [PART, Divisions 02, 05, 06, 07, 10, 11, 12, 15, 16, 17, 18, 19, 20, 21, 22 and 23]
- Ward 35 [PART, Divisions 15, 23, 24, 26, 29 and 30]
- Ward 41 [PART, Divisions 01, 02 and 03]
- Ward 42 [PART, Divisions 12, 13, 14, 15, 16, 17, 18, 19, 20, 21, 24 and 25]
- Ward 53 [PART, Division 01]
- Ward 54 [PART, Division 01]
- Ward 61 [PART, Divisions 01, 02, 03 and 07]
- Ward 62 [PART, Divisions 01, 02, 03, 04, 05, 06, 07, 08, 09, 10, 11, 12, 14 and 19]

== Representatives ==
Representative	Party	Years	District home	Note
Prior to 1969, seats were apportioned by county.
William W. Rieger	Democrat	1969 – 2006		
Tony J. Payton	Democrat	2007 – 2012	Philadelphia	
James Clay, Jr.	Democrat	2013 – 2014	Philadelphia	
Jason Dawkins	Democrat	2015 – present	Philadelphia	Incumbent
