= Timothy R. Bonner =

American attorney and politician

Tim Bonner

Member of the Pennsylvania House of Representatives
- Incumbent
- Assumed office March 12, 2020
- Preceded by: Tedd Nesbit
- Constituency: 8th district (2020-2022); 17th district (2023-present)

Personal details
- Born: June 7, 1950 (age 76) Pennsylvania, U.S.
- Party: Republican
- Education: Westminster College (BA); University of Notre Dame (JD)
- Website: Official website

Timothy R. Bonner (born June 7, 1950) is an American attorney and politician, currently serving as a member of the Pennsylvania House of Representatives from the 17th district. Prior to redistricting, he served from the 8th district.

== Early life and education ==
Bonner earned a Bachelor of Arts degree in political science from Westminster College, followed by a Juris Doctor from Notre Dame Law School.

== Career ==
Prior to entering politics, Bonner worked as an attorney in Mercer County, Pennsylvania. Bonner served as Mercer County Assistant District Attorney from 1993 to 2010. He also worked as an instructor at Grove City College.

Bonner assumed office after a special election March 12, 2020, succeeding Tedd Nesbit, who resigned from the House after being elected to the Court of common pleas. Bonner will serve for the rest of Nesbit's term, and has announced his intention to run for re-election in November 2020. He is a member of the Republican Party.

=== Committee assignments ===
- Children & Youth
- Health, Subcommittee on Health Facilities, Chair
- Human Services
- Judiciary

== Electoral history ==
2020 Pennsylvania House of Representatives 8th district special election
Party	Candidate	Votes	%
Republican	Tim Bonner	4,000	75.08%
Democratic	Phil Heasley	1,328	24.92%
Total votes		5,328	100%

2020 Pennsylvania House of Representatives 8th district Republican primary
Party	Candidate	Votes	%
Republican	Tim Bonner	7,703	87.01%
Republican	Jaillet Scott	1,150	12.99%
Total votes		8,853	100%

2020 Pennsylvania House of Representatives 8th district election
Party	Candidate	Votes	%
Republican	Tim Bonner	23,838	75.15%
Democratic	Phil Heasley	7,883	24.85%
Total votes		31,721	100%

2022 Pennsylvania House of Representatives 17th district election
Party	Candidate	Votes	%
Republican	Tim Bonner	Unopposed	
Total votes		22,001	100%
