= Pennsylvania House of Representatives, District 198 =

American legislative district

Pennsylvania's 198th State House of Representatives district
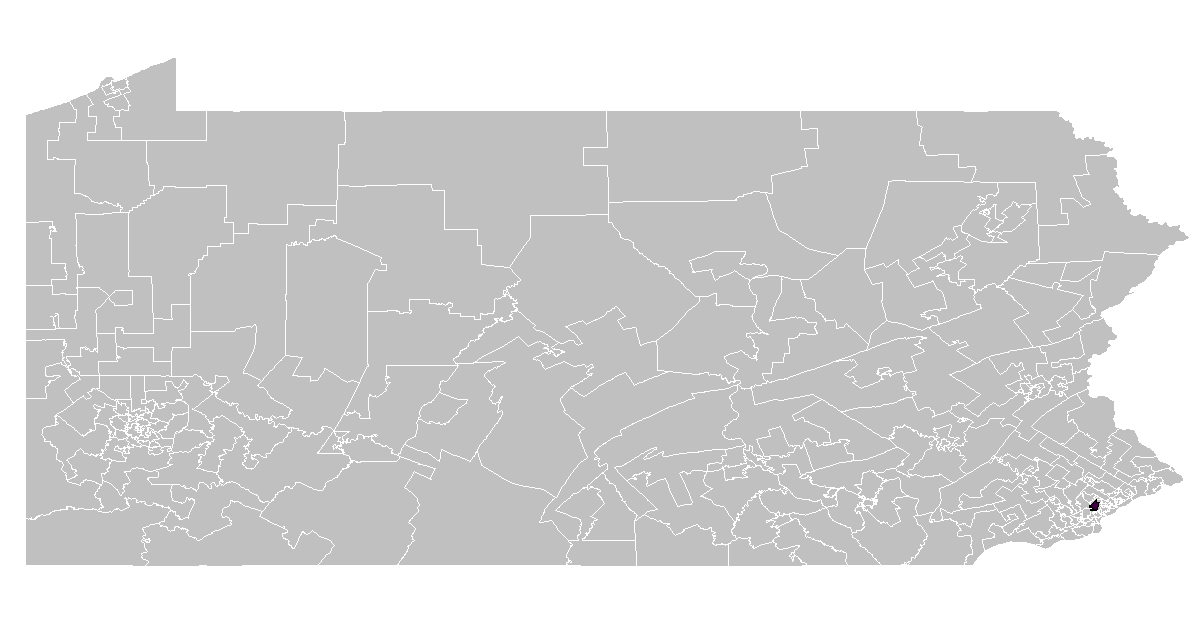
Representative
Darisha Parker; D–Philadelphia

The 198th Pennsylvania House of Representatives District is located in Philadelphia County and includes the following areas:

- Ward 11 [PART, Divisions 04, 05, 06, 09, 10, 12, 14, 15, 16, 17 and 18]
- Ward 12
- Ward 13
- Ward 17 [PART, Divisions 16, 21, 22, 23, 24, 25 and 29]
- Ward 38 [PART, Divisions 02, 03, 04, 05, 06, 10, 11, 17, 18 and 21]

== Representatives ==
Representative	Party	Years	District home	Note
Prior to 1969, seats were apportioned by county.
David M. Savitt	Democrat	1969 – 1974		
Robert W. O'Donnell	Democrat	1973 – 1994		Resigned January 7, 1994
Rosita C. Youngblood	Democrat	1993 – present		Elected April 5, 1994, to fill vacancy Incumbent
