= Pennsylvania House of Representatives =

Lower house of the Pennsylvania General Assembly

Coordinates: 40°15′50″N 76°53′00″W

- Pennsylvania General Assembly

Type
- Type: Lower house
- Term limits: None

History
- New session started: January 7, 2025

Leadership
- Speaker: Joanna McClinton (D) since February 28, 2023
- Majority Leader: Matthew Bradford (D) since February 28, 2023
- Minority Leader: Jesse Topper (R) since January 7, 2025

Structure
- Seats: 203
- Political groups: Majority: Democratic (103); Minority: Republican (100)
- Length of term: 2 years
- Authority: Article II, section 1, Pennsylvania Constitution
- Salary: $113,591 base (as of 2025), $198 per diem

Elections
- Last election: November 5, 2024
- Next election: November 3, 2026

Meeting place
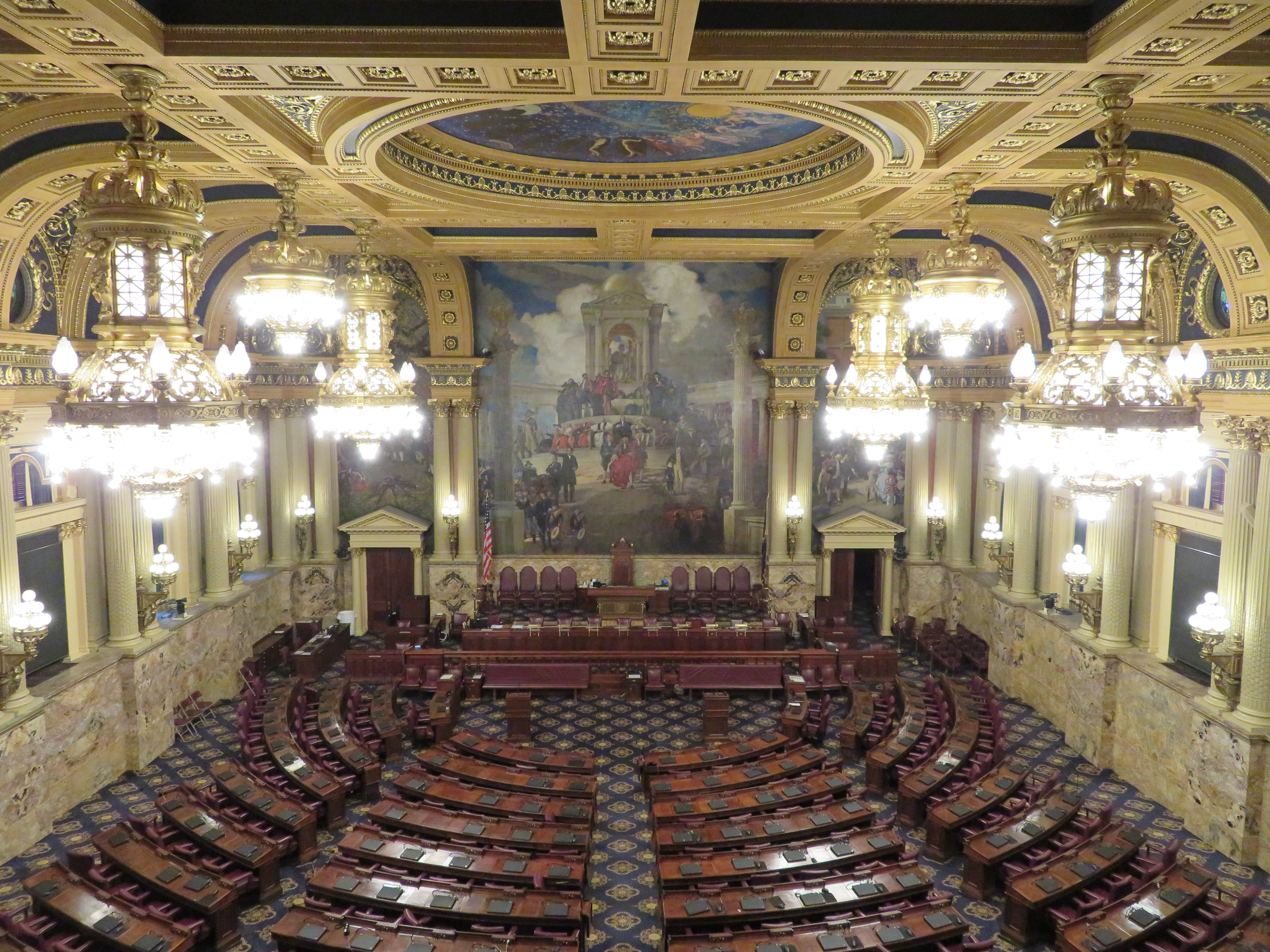
- House of Representatives Chamber; Pennsylvania State Capitol; Harrisburg, Pennsylvania

Website
- Official website

The Pennsylvania House of Representatives is the lower house of the bicameral Pennsylvania General Assembly, the state legislature of the Commonwealth of Pennsylvania. There are 203 members, elected for two-year terms from single member districts.

It is the largest full-time state legislature in the country; the New Hampshire House of Representatives is larger but it only serves part-time.

== Qualifications ==
Representatives must be at least 21 years of age. They must be United States citizens, Pennsylvania residents for at least four years, and residents of the district they represent for one year prior to their election. They must also reside in their district during their term.

== Speaker of the House ==
The speakership is the oldest elected statewide office in the commonwealth. Since its first session in 1682—presided over by William Penn—over 130 House members have been elevated to the speaker's chair. The House cannot hold an official session in the absence of the speaker or their designated speaker pro tempore. Speaker Leroy Irvis was the first African-American elected speaker of any state legislature in the United States since Reconstruction. Speaker Dennis O'Brien was the only minority-party speaker known in Pennsylvania and only the second known nationwide.

Democrat Joanna McClinton was elected speaker of the House on February 28, 2023, becoming the first female speaker in Pennsylvania.

== Composition ==
=== Current session ===
As of September 8, 2026:

↓
103	100
Democratic	Republican

Affiliation	Party (shading indicates majority caucus)			Total	Vacant
Affiliation	Republican	Independent	Democratic	Total	Vacant
End of previous legislature	101	0	102	203	0
January 7, 2025	101	0	102	203	0
January 19, 2025	101	0	101	202	1
March 26, 2025	101	0	102	203	0
December 17, 2025	101	0	100	201	2
December 30, 2025	100	0	100	200	3
December 31, 2025	99	0	100	199	4
January 31, 2026	98	0	100	198	5
March 23, 2026	98	0	102	200	3
March 31, 2026	97	0	102	199	4
April 13, 2026	99	0	102	201	2
June 9, 2026	100	0	102	202	1
September 8, 2026	100	0	103	203	0
Latest voting share	49.3%		50.7%		

=== Leadership ===
As of November 13, 2024:

Speaker of the House: Joanna McClinton (D)

Majority Party (D)	Leadership Position	Minority Party (R)
Matthew Bradford	Floor Leader	Jesse Topper
Michael Schlossberg	Whip	Tim O'Neal
Robert Matzie	Caucus Chairperson	Martina White
Tina Davis	Caucus Secretary	Clint Owlett
Jordan A. Harris	Appropriations Committee Chairperson	Jim Struzzi
Leanne Krueger	Caucus Administrator	Sheryl M. Delozier
Ryan Bizzarro	Policy Committee Chairperson	David H. Rowe

== Membership ==
=== List of current representatives ===
House composition by district, Jan 2026: Democratic representative Republican representative Seat vacant

As of September 8, 2026:

District	Name	Party	Residence	Counties	Start
1	Pat Harkins	Democratic	Erie	Erie	2006
2	Robert Merski	Democratic	Erie	Erie	2018
3	Ryan Bizzarro	Democratic	Millcreek Township	Erie	2012
4	Jake Banta	Republican	Waterford	Erie	2022
5	Eric Weaknecht	Republican	Bern Township	Berks	2024
6	Brad Roae	Republican	East Mead Township	Crawford, Erie	2006
7	Parke Wentling	Republican	Greenville	Mercer	2014
8	Aaron Bernstine	Republican	New Beaver	Butler, Lawrence	2016
9	Marla Brown	Republican	New Castle	Lawrence	2022
10	Amen Brown	Democratic	Philadelphia	Philadelphia	2020
11	Marci Mustello	Republican	Butler Township	Butler	2019
12	Brandon Dukes	Democratic	Butler Township	Butler	2026
13	John Lawrence	Republican	Franklin Township	Chester	2010
14	Roman Kozak	Republican	Beaver Falls	Beaver	2024
15	Josh Kail	Republican	Beaver	Beaver, Washington	2018
16	Robert Matzie	Democratic	Ambridge	Beaver	2008
17	Timothy R. Bonner	Republican	Grove City	Butler, Mercer	2020
18	K.C. Tomlinson	Republican	Bensalem	Bucks	2020
19	Aerion Abney	Democratic	Pittsburgh	Allegheny	2022
20	Emily Kinkead	Democratic	Pittsburgh	Allegheny	2020
21	Lindsay Powell	Democratic	Pittsburgh	Allegheny	2023
22	Ana Tiburcio	Democratic	Allentown	Lehigh	2026
23	Dan Frankel	Democratic	Pittsburgh	Allegheny	1998
24	La'Tasha Mayes	Democratic	Pittsburgh	Allegheny	2022
25	Brandon Markosek	Democratic	Monroeville	Allegheny	2018
26	Paul Friel	Democratic	East Vincent Township	Chester	2022
27	Daniel Deasy	Democratic	Pittsburgh	Allegheny	2008
28	Jeremy Shaffer	Republican	Wexford	Allegheny	2024
29	Tim Brennan	Democratic	Doylestown	Bucks	2022
30	Arvind Venkat	Democratic	McCandless	Allegheny	2022
31	Perry Warren	Democratic	Newtown	Bucks	2016
32	Joe McAndrew	Democratic	Penn Hills	Allegheny	2023
33	Mandy Steele	Democratic	Fox Chapel	Allegheny	2022
34	Abigail Salisbury	Democratic	Swissvale	Allegheny	2023
35	Daniel Goughnour	Democratic	McKeesport	Allegheny	2025
36	Jessica Benham	Democratic	Pittsburgh	Allegheny	2020
37	Mindy Fee	Republican	Manheim	Lancaster	2012
38	John Inglis	Democratic	West Mifflin	Allegheny	2024
39	Andrew Kuzma	Republican	Elizabeth Township	Allegheny, Washington	2022
40	Natalie Mihalek	Republican	Upper St. Clair	Allegheny, Washington	2018
41	Brett Miller	Republican	East Hempfield Township	Lancaster	2014
42	Jen Mazzocco	Democratic	Dormont	Allegheny	2026
43	Keith Greiner	Republican	West Lampeter Township	Lancaster	2012
44	Valerie Gaydos	Republican	Moon Township	Allegheny	2018
45	Anita Astorino Kulik	Democratic	Kennedy Township	Allegheny	2016
46	Jason Ortitay	Republican	South Fayette Township	Allegheny, Washington	2014
47	Joseph D'Orsie	Republican	Mount Wolf	York	2022
48	Tim O'Neal	Republican	South Strabane Township	Washington	2018
49	Ismail Smith-Wade-El	Democratic	Lancaster	Lancaster	2022
50	Bud Cook	Republican	Jefferson	Greene, Washington	2016
51	Charity Grimm Krupa	Republican	Smithfield	Fayette	2022
52	Ryan Warner	Republican	Perryopolis	Fayette	2014
53	Steve Malagari	Democratic	Lansdale	Montgomery	2018
54	Greg Scott	Democratic	Norristown	Montgomery	2022
55	Jill N. Cooper	Republican	Murrysville	Westmoreland	2022
56	Brian Rasel	Republican	Penn Township	Westmoreland	2024
57	Eric Nelson	Republican	Hempfield Township	Westmoreland	2016
58	Eric Davanzo	Republican	Smithton	Westmoreland	2020
59	Leslie Rossi	Republican	Unity Township	Westmoreland	2021
60	Abby Major	Republican	Leechburg	Armstrong, Westmoreland	2021
61	Liz Hanbidge	Democratic	Lower Gwynedd Township	Montgomery	2018
62	James Struzzi	Republican	Indiana	Indiana	2018
63	Josh Bashline	Republican	Clarion	Armstrong, Clarion	2024
64	Lee James	Republican	Oil City	Crawford, Venango	2012
65	Kathy Rapp	Republican	Warren	Crawford, Forest, Warren	2004
66	Brian Smith	Republican	Punxsutawney	Indiana, Jefferson	2020
67	Martin Causer	Republican	Port Allegany	Cameron, McKean, Potter	2002
68	Clint Owlett	Republican	Liberty	Bradford, Tioga	2018
69	Carl Walker Metzgar	Republican	Berlin	Somerset	2008
70	Matthew Bradford	Democratic	Worcester Township	Montgomery	2008
71	James Rigby	Republican	Johnstown	Cambria, Somerset	2018
72	Frank Burns	Democratic	East Taylor Township	Cambria	2008
73	Dallas Kephart	Republican	Decatur Township	Cambria, Clearfield	2022
74	Dan K. Williams	Democratic	Sadsbury Township	Chester	2018
75	Michael Armanini	Republican	Sandy Township	Clearfield, Elk	2020
76	Stephanie Borowicz	Republican	Lock Haven	Clinton, Union	2018
77	Scott Conklin	Democratic	Rush Township	Centre	2006
78	Jesse Topper	Republican	Bedford	Bedford, Fulton	2014
79	Andrea Verobish	Republican	Blair	Blair	2026
80	Scott Barger	Republican	Hollidaysburg	Blair, Huntingdon	2024
81	Rich Irvin	Republican	Spruce Creek Township	Franklin, Huntingdon	2014
82	Paul Takac	Democratic	College Township	Centre	2022
83	Jamie Flick	Republican	South Williamsport	Lycoming, Union	2022
84	Joseph D. Hamm	Republican	Hepburn Township	Lycoming, Sullivan	2020
85	David Rowe	Republican	East Buffalo Township	Juniata, Mifflin, Snyder, Union	2019
86	Perry A. Stambaugh	Republican	Tyrone Township	Juniata, Perry	2020
87	Thomas Kutz	Republican	Lower Allen Township	Cumberland	2022
88	Sheryl M. Delozier	Republican	Lower Allen Township	Cumberland	2008
89	Rob Kauffman	Republican	Chambersburg	Franklin	2004
90	Chad Reichard	Republican	Waynesboro	Franklin	2024
91	Dan Moul	Republican	Conewago Township	Adams	2006
92	Marc Anderson	Republican	Dillsburg	York	2024
93	Mike Jones	Republican	York Township	York	2018
94	Wendy Fink	Republican	Red Lion	York	2022
95	Carol Hill-Evans	Democratic	York	York	2016
96	Nikki Rivera	Democratic	Lancaster	Lancaster	2024
97	Steven Mentzer	Republican	Manheim Township	Lancaster	2012
98	Tom Jones	Republican	East Donegal Township	Lancaster, Lebanon	2022
99	David H. Zimmerman	Republican	East Earl Township	Berks, Lancaster	2014
100	Bryan Cutler	Republican	Drumore Township	Lancaster	2006
101	John A. Schlegel	Republican	Cornwall	Lebanon	2022
102	Russ Diamond	Republican	Annville Township	Lebanon	2014
103	Nathan Davidson	Democratic	Harrisburg	Cumberland, Dauphin	2024
104	Dave Madsen	Democratic	Harrisburg	Dauphin	2022
105	Justin C. Fleming	Democratic	Susquehanna Township	Dauphin	2022
106	Tom Mehaffie	Republican	Lower Swatara Township	Dauphin	2016
107	Joanne Stehr	Republican	Hegins Township	Northumberland, Schuylkill	2022
108	Mike Stender	Republican	Sunbury	Montour, Northumberland	2023
109	Robert Leadbeter	Republican	Catawissa	Columbia	2022
110	Tina Pickett	Republican	Towanda	Bradford, Wyoming	2000
111	Jonathan Fritz	Republican	Honesdale	Susquehanna, Wayne	2016
112	Kyle Mullins	Democratic	Blakely	Lackawanna	2018
113	Kyle Donahue	Democratic	Scranton	Lackawanna	2022
114	Bridget Malloy Kosierowski	Democratic	Scranton	Lackawanna	2019
115	Maureen Madden	Democratic	Coolbaugh Township	Monroe	2016
116	Dane Watro	Republican	McAdoo	Luzerne, Schuylkill	2022
117	Jamie Walsh	Republican	Sweet Valley	Luzerne	2024
118	Jim Haddock	Democratic	Pittston Township	Lackawanna, Luzerne	2022
119	Alec Ryncavage	Republican	Plymouth	Luzerne	2022
120	Brenda Pugh	Republican	Dallas Township	Luzerne	2024
121	Eddie Day Pashinski	Democratic	Wilkes-Barre	Luzerne	2006
122	Doyle Heffley	Republican	Lower Towamensing Township	Carbon	2010
123	Timothy Twardzik	Republican	Butler Township	Schuylkill	2020
124	Jamie Barton	Republican	East Brunswick Township	Berks, Schuylkill	2022
125	Joseph Kerwin	Republican	Lykens	Dauphin	2020
126	Jacklyn Rusnock	Democratic	Muhlenberg Township	Berks	2024
127	Manny Guzman Jr.	Democratic	Reading	Berks	2020
128	Mark M. Gillen	Republican	Robeson Township	Berks	2010
129	Johanny Cepeda-Freytiz	Democratic	Reading	Berks	2022
130	David Maloney	Republican	Pike Township	Berks	2010
131	Milou Mackenzie	Republican	Lower Saucon Township	Lehigh, Montgomery, Northampton	2020
132	Michael Schlossberg	Democratic	Allentown	Lehigh	2012
133	Jeanne McNeill	Democratic	Whitehall Township	Lehigh	2017
134	Peter Schweyer	Democratic	Allentown	Lehigh	2014
135	Steve Samuelson	Democratic	Bethlehem	Northampton	1998
136	Robert L. Freeman	Democratic	Easton	Northampton	1998 (Note: Rep. Freeman previously served from 1983 to 1994.)
137	Joe Emrick	Republican	Nazareth	Northampton	2010
138	Ann Flood	Republican	Moore Township	Northampton	2020
139	Jeff Olsommer	Republican	Hawley	Pike, Wayne	2024
140	Jim Prokopiak	Democratic	Falls Township	Bucks	2024
141	Tina Davis	Democratic	Levittown	Bucks	2010
142	Joe Hogan	Republican	Langhorne	Bucks	2022
143	Shelby Labs	Republican	Plumstead Township	Bucks	2020
144	Brian Munroe	Democratic	Warminster	Bucks	2022
145	Craig Staats	Republican	Richland Township	Bucks	2014
146	Joe Ciresi	Democratic	Limerick Township	Montgomery	2018
147	Donna Scheuren	Republican	Lower Salford Township	Montgomery	2022
148	Mary Jo Daley	Democratic	Narberth	Montgomery	2012
149	Tim Briggs	Democratic	Upper Merion Township	Montgomery	2008
150	Joe Webster	Democratic	Montgomery County	Montgomery	2018
151	Melissa Cerrato	Democratic	Horsham	Montgomery	2022
152	Nancy Guenst	Democratic	Hatboro	Montgomery, Philadelphia	2020
153	Ben Sanchez	Democratic	Abington Township	Montgomery	2018
154	Napoleon Nelson	Democratic	Cheltenham Township	Montgomery	2020
155	Danielle Friel Otten	Democratic	Uwchlan Township	Chester	2018
156	Chris Pielli	Democratic	West Chester	Chester	2022
157	Melissa Shusterman	Democratic	Schuylkill Township	Chester	2018
158	Christina Sappey	Democratic	West Bradford	Chester	2018
159	Carol Kazeem	Democratic	Chester	Delaware	2022
160	Wendell Craig Williams	Republican	Concord Township	Chester, Delaware	2020
161	Leanne Krueger	Democratic	Swarthmore	Delaware	2015
162	David Delloso	Democratic	Ridley Township	Delaware	2018
163	Heather Boyd	Democratic	Upper Darby	Delaware	2023
164	Gina Curry	Democratic	Upper Darby Township	Delaware	2021 (Note: Margo Davidson resigned on July 23, 2021, after being charged with theft of state funds.)
165	Jennifer O'Mara	Democratic	Springfield Township	Delaware	2018
166	Greg Vitali	Democratic	Havertown	Delaware	1992
167	Kristine Howard	Democratic	East Whiteland Township	Chester	2018
168	Lisa Borowski	Democratic	Radnor Township	Delaware	2022
169	Kate Klunk	Republican	Hanover	York	2014
170	Martina White	Republican	Philadelphia	Philadelphia	2015
171	Kerry Benninghoff	Republican	Bellefonte	Centre, Mifflin	1996
172	Sean Dougherty	Democratic	Philadelphia	Philadelphia	2024
173	Pat Gallagher	Democratic	Philadelphia	Philadelphia	2022
174	Ed Neilson	Democratic	Philadelphia	Philadelphia	2015 (Note: Rep. Neilson previously served from 2012 to 2014.)
175	Mary Isaacson	Democratic	Philadelphia	Philadelphia	2018
176	Jack Rader	Republican	Jackson Township	Monroe	2014
177	Joseph Hohenstein	Democratic	Philadelphia	Philadelphia	2018
178	Kristin Marcell	Republican	Wrightstown Township	Bucks	2022
179	Jason Dawkins	Democratic	Philadelphia	Philadelphia	2014
180	Jose Giral	Democratic	Philadelphia	Philadelphia	2022
181	Malcolm Kenyatta	Democratic	Philadelphia	Philadelphia	2018
182	Ben Waxman	Democratic	Philadelphia	Philadelphia	2022
183	Zach Mako	Republican	Walnutport	Lehigh, Northampton	2016
184	Elizabeth Fiedler	Democratic	Philadelphia	Philadelphia	2018
185	Regina Young	Democratic	Philadelphia	Delaware, Philadelphia	2020
186	Jordan A. Harris	Democratic	Philadelphia	Philadelphia	2012
187	Gary Day	Republican	Lower Macungie Township	Lehigh	2024
188	Rick Krajewski	Democratic	Philadelphia	Philadelphia	2020
189	Tarah Probst	Democratic	Stroudsburg	Monroe, Pike	2022
190	Roni Green	Democratic	Philadelphia	Philadelphia	2022
191	Joanna McClinton	Democratic	Philadelphia	Delaware, Philadelphia	2015
192	Morgan Cephas	Democratic	Philadelphia	Philadelphia	2016
193	Catherine Wallen	Republican	York Springs	Adams, Cumberland	2026
194	Tarik Khan	Democratic	Philadelphia	Philadelphia	2022
195	Keith Harris	Democratic	Philadelphia	Philadelphia	2024
196	George Margetas	Republican	York	York	2026
197	Danilo Burgos	Democratic	Philadelphia	Philadelphia	2018
198	Darisha Parker	Democratic	Philadelphia	Philadelphia	2020
199	Barbara Gleim	Republican	Middlesex Township	Cumberland	2018
200	Chris Rabb	Democratic	Philadelphia	Philadelphia	2016
201	Andre Carroll	Democratic	Philadelphia	Philadelphia	2024
202	Jared Solomon	Democratic	Philadelphia	Philadelphia	2016
203	Anthony A. Bellmon	Democratic	Philadelphia	Philadelphia	2022

== Committees ==
As of March 29, 2025:

Committee name	Majority chair (D)	Minority chair (R)
Subcommittee name	Majority chair (D)	Minority chair (R)
Aging & Older Adult Services	Maureen Madden	Steven Mentzer
Care and Services	Darisha Parker	Eric Nelson
Programs and Benefits	Jessica Benham	Joanne Stehr
Agriculture & Rural Affairs	Eddie Day Pashinski	Dan Moul
Appropriations	Jordan A. Harris	James Struzzi
Health and Human Services	Aerion Abney	Eric Nelson
Education	Joe Webster	Ann Flood
Economic Impact and Infrastructure	Manny Guzman Jr.	Zach Mako
Fiscal Policy	Ben Sanchez	Ryan Warner
Criminal Justice	Ben Waxman	Josh Kail
Government and Financial Oversight	Steve Malagari	Kristin Marcell
Children & Youth	Jeanne McNeill	Kate Klunk
Commerce	Scott Conklin	John A. Lawrence
Financial Services and Banking	Malcolm Kenyatta	Shelby Labs
Housing Finance	Morgan Cephas	Kristin Marcell
Economic Development	Johanny Cepeda-Freytiz	Timothy Twardzik
Local Business	Chris Rabb	Marla Brown
Automation and Technology	Chris Pielli	Donna Scheuren
Committee On Committees	Dan Miller	Tina Pickett
Communications & Technology	Joe Ciresi	Jason Ortitay
Consumer Protection, Technology & Utilities (Note: Known as the Consumer Affairs Committee prior to 2023.)	Danilo Burgos	Carl Walker Metzgar
Consumer Protection	Lisa Borowski	Joe Hogan
Technology	Steve Malagari	Alec Ryncavage
Utilities	Pat Gallagher	Craig Williams
Education	Peter Schweyer	Bryan Cutler
Basic Education	Gina Curry	Barbara Gleim
Special Education	Paul Takac	Joe D'Orsie
Higher Education	Mary Isaacson	Dane Watro
Career and Technical Education	Aerion Abney	John A. Schlegel
Energy	Elizabeth Fiedler	Martin Causer
Environmental Resources & Natural Resource Protection	Greg Vitali	Jack Rader
Parks and Forests	Mary Isaacson	Michael Stender
Mining	Paul Takac	Louis Schmitt Jr.
Ethics	Peter Schweyer	Carl Walker Metzgar
Finance	Steve Samuelson	Keith Greiner
Tax Modernization and Reform	Chris Rabb	Dallas Kephart
Game & Fisheries	Anita Kulik	David Maloney
Gaming Oversight	Pat Harkins	Russ Diamond
Government Oversight	Morgan Cephas	Craig Williams
Health	Dan Frankel	Kathy Rapp
Health Facilities	Lisa Borowski	Timothy R. Bonner
Health Care	Rick Krajewski	Timothy Twardzik
Housing and Community Development (Note: Known as the Urban Affairs Committee prior to 2023.)	Brandon Markosek	Rich Irvin
Human Services	Dan K. Williams	Doyle Heffley
Mental Health	Jessica Benham	Ann Flood
Drugs and Alcohol	Arvind Venkat	Jamie Flick
Insurance	Perry Warren	Tina Pickett
Intergovernmental Affairs & Operations	David Delloso	Craig Staats
Judiciary	Tim Briggs	Rob Kauffman
Family Law	Melissa Shusterman	Timothy R. Bonner
Courts	Joseph C. Hohenstein	Robert Leadbeter
Crime and Corrections	Dan Miller	Jim Rigby
Labor & Industry	Jason Dawkins	Seth Grove
Employment and Unemployment Compensation	Jennifer O'Mara	Torren Ecker
Workers Compensation and Worker Protection	Tim Brennan	Aaron Bernstine
Liquor Control	Dan Deasy	Mindy Fee
Licensing	Mary Isaacson	Tom Mehaffie
Marketing	Lindsay Powell	Jonathan Fritz
Local Government	Bob Freeman	Brett Miller
Counties	Liz Hanbidge	Tom Jones
Cities	Kyle Donahue	Dane Watro
Boroughs	Tarah Probst	Wendy Fink
Townships	Lisa Borowski	Parke Wentling
Policy	Ryan Bizzarro	David H. Rowe
Professional Licensure	Frank Burns	Joe Emrick
Rules	Matthew Bradford	Jesse Topper
State Government	Carol Hill-Evans	Brad Roae
Campaign Finance and Elections	Joe Webster	Russ Diamond
Government Operations	Ben Sanchez	Wendy Fink
Public Pensions, Benefits and Risk Management	Malcolm Kenyatta	Timothy R. Bonner
Government Information Technology and Communication	Kristine Howard	Stephenie Scialabba
Government Integrity and Transparency	Melissa Shusterman	Jake Banta
Tourism & Economic & Recreational Development	Mary Jo Daley	Robert Lee James
Recreation	Anthony A. Bellmon	Brian Smith
Arts and Entertainment	Johanny Cepeda-Freytiz	Jill Cooper
Travel Promotion, History and Heritage	Tim Brennan	Michael Armanini
Transportation	Ed Neilson	Kerry Benninghoff
Highways	Anthony A. Bellmon	Donna Scheuren
Public Transportation	Joe McAndrew	Perry A. Stambaugh
Transportation Safety	Kyle Mullins	Eric Davanzo
Aviation	Joshua Siegel	Brian Smith
Railroads	Gina Curry	Aaron Bernstine
Ports	Joseph C. Hohenstein	Shelby Labs
Veterans Affairs & Emergency Preparedness	Jared Solomon	Shelby Labs
Military and Veterans Facilities	Joe Webster	Craig Williams
Security and Emergency Response Readiness	Jennifer O'Mara	Jim Rigby

== See also ==
- Pennsylvania State Senate
- List of Pennsylvania state legislatures

== Sources ==
- Trostle, Sharon, ed. (2009). The Pennsylvania Manual. Vol. 119. Harrisburg: Pennsylvania Department of General Services. ISBN 978-0-8182-0334-3.
