= 2026 Pennsylvania House of Representatives election =

- November 3, 2026

All 203 seats in the Pennsylvania House of Representatives 102 seats needed for a majority
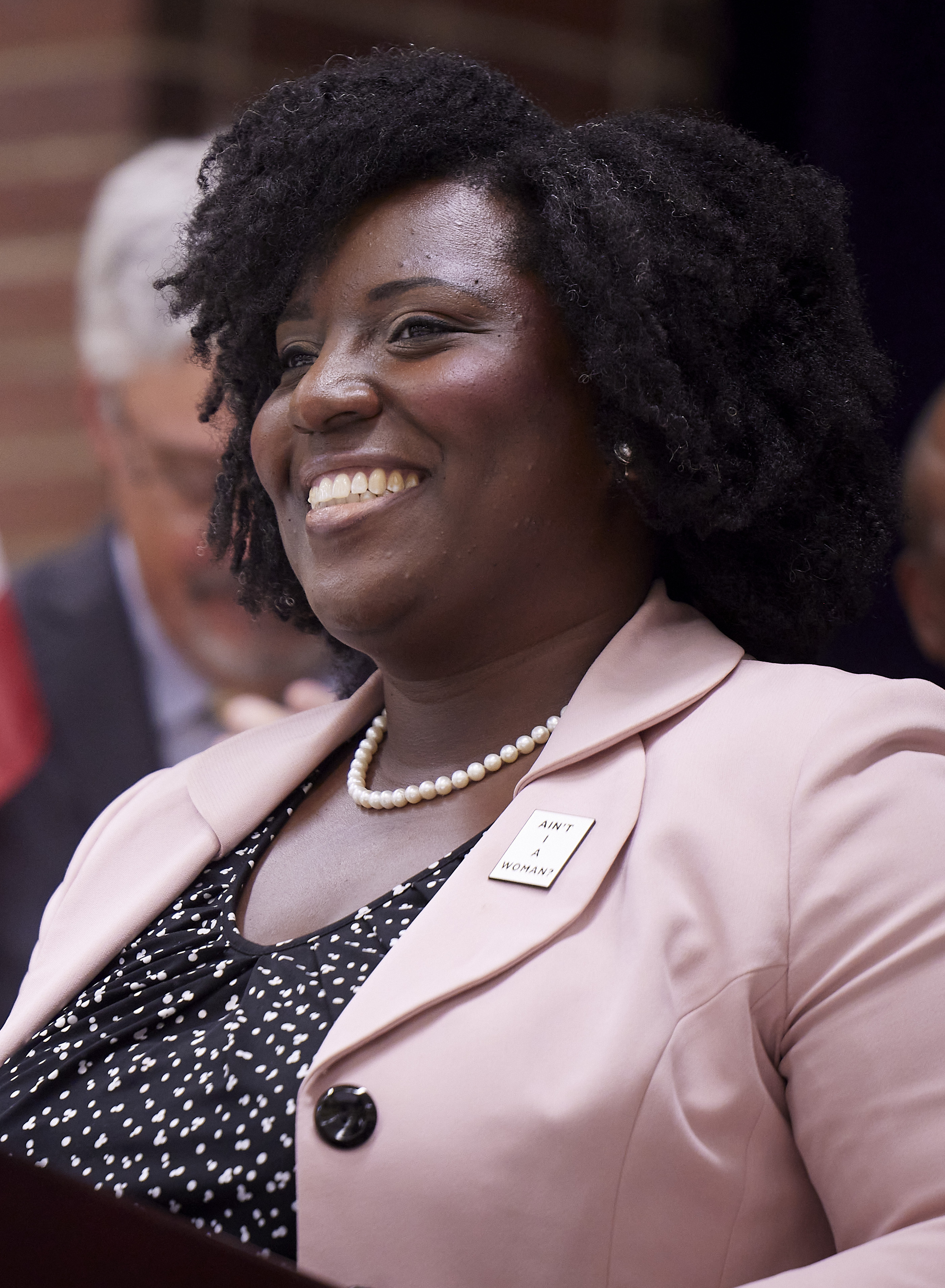

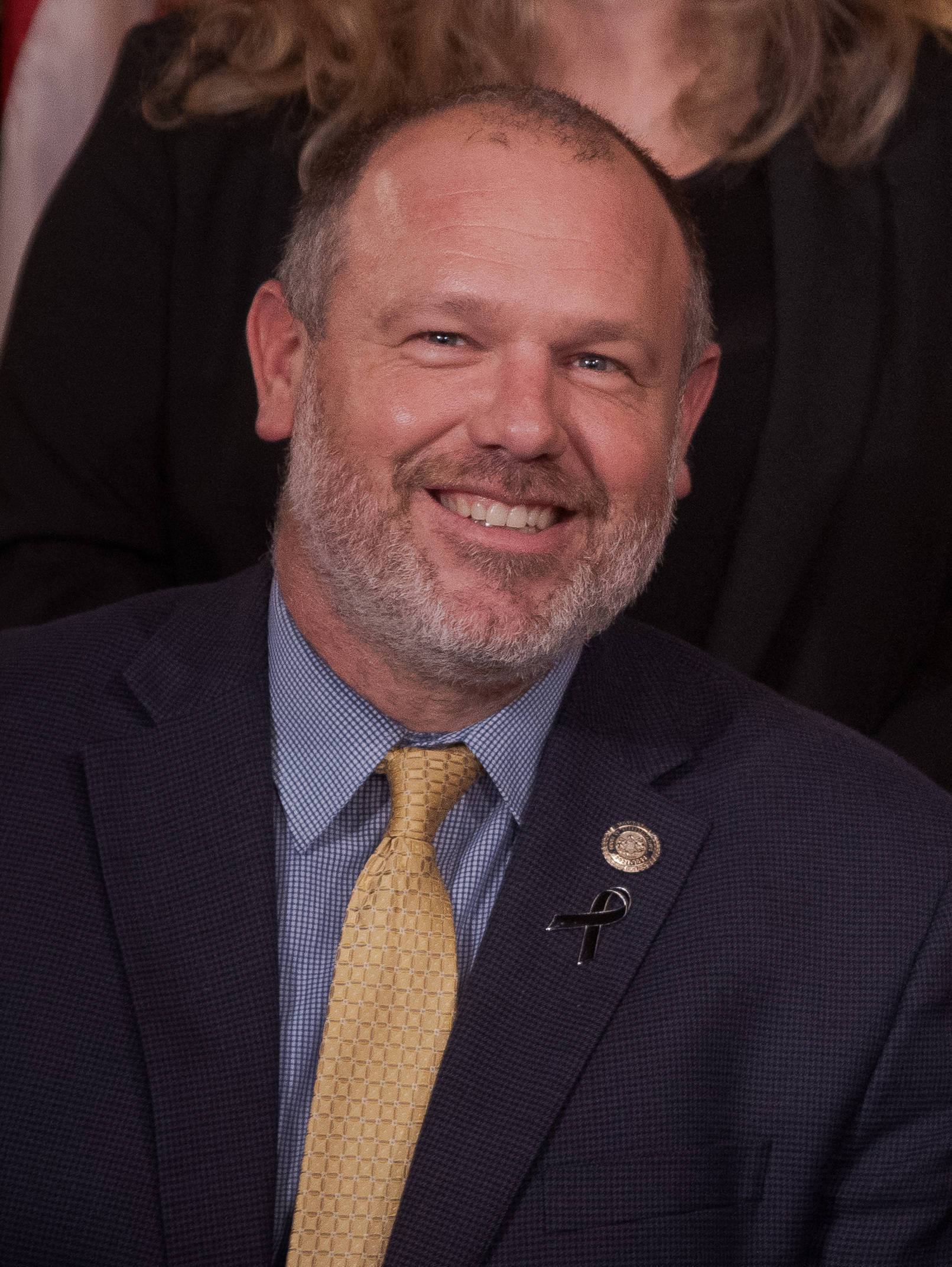
	Majority party	Minority party
Leader	Joanna McClinton	Jesse Topper
Party	Democratic	Republican
Leader since	December 1, 2020	January 7, 2025
Leader's seat	191st	78th
Last election	102	101
Seats before	103	100
Seats won	111-114	89-92
Seat change	▲8-11	▼8-11
- Legend: Result TBD; Democratic hold Democratic gain Republican hold Republican gain
Speaker before election
Joanna McClinton
Democratic
Elected Speaker
Democratic

The 2026 Pennsylvania House of Representatives election was held on November 3, 2026, alongside the other 2026 United States elections. Voters elected members of the Pennsylvania House of Representatives in all 203 of the U.S. state of Pennsylvania's legislative districts to serve a two-year term.

== Special elections ==
=== 22nd district ===
After being elected Lehigh County Executive, Representative Joshua Siegel resigned from the state House on December 17, 2025. A special election is scheduled for February 24. The Democratic Party initially chose Julian Guridy, a staffer to state Senator Nick Miller, as its candidate. However, Guridy did not met the residency requirement to run for the state House and was forced to withdraw. He was replaced by Allentown School Board member Ana Tiburcio. The Republican Party has selected its 2022 nominee Robert E. Smith Jr., a former Allentown School Board member. Tiburcio won the election.

District 22 special election
Party	Candidate	Votes	%
Democratic	Ana Tiburcio	1,474	67.3
Republican	Robert E. Smith Jr.	717	32.7
Total votes		2,191	100.0

=== 42nd district ===
Representative Dan Miller was elected as a judge in Allegheny County in 2025 and resigned from the state House on December 17, 2025. A special election is scheduled for February 24. The Democratic Party selected Dormont borough councilor Jennifer Mazzocco. The Republican Party selected 2024 nominee Joseph Leckenby. Mazzocco won the election.

District 42 special election
Party	Candidate	Votes	%
Democratic	Jennifer Mazzocco	10,451	81.49
Republican	Joseph Leckenby	2,338	18.23
Write-in		36	0.28
Total votes		12,825	100.0

=== 79th district ===
Representative Lou Schmitt was elected as a judge in Blair County in 2025 and resigned on December 31. A special election is scheduled for March 17. The Republican Party chose Andrea Verobish, a staffer for Congressman Glenn Thompson, as its candidate. The Democratic Party nominated registered nurse Caleb McCoy. Verobish won the election.

District 79 special election
Party	Candidate	Votes	%
Republican	Andrea Verobish	5,330	57.6
Democratic	Caleb McCoy	3,923	42.4
Total votes		9,253	100

=== 193rd district ===
Representative Torren Ecker was elected as a judge in Adams County in 2025 and resigned on December 30. A special election is scheduled for March 17. On January 15, Republicans in Cumberland and Adams counties selected Ecker staffer Catherine Wallen to be their nominee. On January 24, Democrats nominated former Harrisburg Area Community College official Todd Crawley. Wallen won the election.

District 193 special election
Party	Candidate	Votes	%
Republican	Catherine Wallen	5,234	59.69
Democratic	Todd Crawley	3,534	40.31
Total votes		8,768	100.00

=== 196th district ===
Representative Seth Grove announced that he would resign effective January 31. He had previously stated that he would not seek reelection in 2026. Since January 1, Grove was CEO of the Pennsylvania Aggregates and Concrete Association, a lobbying group. Because he was also the minority chair of the Labor & Industry Committee, Grove faced accusations of a conflict of interest and announced his resignation under scrutiny. A special election coincided with the primary election on May 19. The Democratic Party nominated West Manchester Township supervisor and former gubernatorial press secretary Ron Ruman. The Republican Party nominated attorney George Margetas who won.

District 196 special election
Party	Candidate	Votes	%
Republican	George Margetas	6,197	55.37
Democratic	Ron Ruman	4,975	44.46
Write-in		19	0.17
Total votes		11,191	100.00

=== 12th district ===
Representative Stephenie Scialabba previously announced plans to retire at the conclusion of the current term. She later announced her resignation effective March 31. A special election took place August 18. Scott Timko was the Republican candidate. Brandon Dukes was the Democratic candidate. Dukes won by less than 100 votes, becoming the first Democrat to represent this district since Patricia Carone switched parties in the 1990s. With the win, the Democrats increased their majority in the Pennsylvania House to 103-100.

District 12 special election
Party	Candidate	Votes	%
Democratic	Brandon Dukes	8,470	50.29
Republican	Scott Timko	8,372	49.71
Total votes		16,780	100.0

== Results summary ==
=== Retiring incumbents ===
==== Democrats ====
1. District 45: Anita Kulik retired
2. District 148: Mary Jo Daley retired
3. District 121: Eddie Day Pashinski retired
4. District 200: Chris Rabb retired to run for U.S. House

==== Republicans ====
1. District 88: Sheryl Delozier retired
2. District 98: Tom Jones retired to run for run for State Senate
3. District 100: Bryan Cutler retired
4. District 130: David Maloney retired

=== Incumbents defeated in primary ===
==== Democrats ====
1. District 22: Ana Tiburcio lost renomination to Ce-Ce Gerlach
2. District 166: Greg Vitali lost renomination to Judy Trombetta
3. District 195: Keith Harris lost renomination to Sierra McNeil

==== Republicans ====
1. District 50: Bud Cook lost renomination to Ben Humble

=== Incumbents defeated in general ===
==== Democrats ====
1. District 12: Brandon Dukes lost reelection to Scott Timko

==== Republicans ====
1. District 13: John Lawrence lost reelection to Madelyn Alvarino
2. District 18: K.C. Tomlinson lost reelection to Bryan Allen
3. District 44: Valerie Gaydos lost reelection to Hadley Haas
4. District 131: Milou Mackenzie lost reelection to Meriam Sabih
5. District 137: Joe Emrick lost reelection to Jeff Warren
6. District 142: Joe Hogan lost reelection to Kristin Egan
7. District 143: Shelby Labs lost reelection to Tim Hayes
8. District 143: Donna Scheuren lost reelection to Margaret Burke
9. District 160: Craig Williams lost reelection to Elizabeth Moro
10. District 187: Gary Day lost reelection to Rachel Cuevas

== Crossover seats ==
This is a list of seats that voted for one party in the 2024 presidential election and another in the 2024 house election.

=== Democratic ===
This lists the districts which Donald Trump won in 2024 that are represented by Democrats:

District		Incumbent				
#	Trump margin of victory in 2024	Member	Party	First elected	Incumbent margin of victory in 2024	Incumbent status
12	R+18.4	Brandon Dukes	Democratic	2026 (spec.)	D+0.6 (Note: Margin from his most recent election.)	Defeated
16	R+7.5	Robert Matzie	Democratic	2008	D+4.6	Reelected
72	R+31.2	Frank Burns	Democratic	2008	D+2.8	Reelected
118	R+7.5	Jim Haddock	Democratic	2022	D+12.5	Reelected
121	R+1.7	Eddie Day Pashinski	Democratic	2006	D+10.6	Retired
144	R+0.3	Brian Munroe	Democratic	2022	D+2.7	Reelected
172	R+0.8	Sean Dougherty	Democratic	2024	D+2.0	Reelected

=== Republican ===
This lists the district which Kamala Harris won in 2024 that is represented by a Republican:

District		Incumbent				
#	Harris margin of victory in 2024	Member	Party	First elected	Incumbent margin of victory in 2024	Incumbent status
160	D+5.3	Wendell Craig Williams	Republican	2020	R+3.6	Defeated

== Primary elections ==
=== Democratic primary ===
2026 Pennsylvania House of Representatives elections Democratic primary
District	Candidates	Votes	Percent
1	Pat Harkins	Unopposed	
2	Bob Merski	Unopposed	
3	Ryan Bizzarro	Unopposed	
4	Kathryn A. Divittorio	Unopposed	
5	Andres Ruben Flammer Santiago	Unopposed	
6	Michael C. Walker	Unopposed	
7	Chris Ford (Note: Won as a write-in candidate)	505	64.91
8	Richard E. Telesz	Unopposed	
9	Shay Micco	Unopposed	
10	Amen Brown	Unopposed	
11	No candidate filed		
12	Brandon Dukes	Unopposed	
13	Madelyn Alvarino	Unopposed	
14	Bradley Jacob Young	644	66.25
15	Sydney Louise Speicher	Unopposed	
16	Robert Matzie	Unopposed	
17	No candidate filed		
18	Bryan Allen	Unopposed	
19	Aerion Abney	Unopposed	
20	Emily Kinkead	Unopposed	
21	Lindsay Powell	Unopposed	
22	Ce-Ce Gerlach	1,703	56.69
22	Ana Tiburcio	1,301	43.31
23	Dan Frankel	Unopposed	
24	La'Tasha Mayes	8,910	87.77
24	Will Anderson	1,209	11.91
25	Brandon Markosek	Unopposed	
26	Paul Friel	Unopposed	
27	Dan Deasy	Unopposed	
28	Jeremy Ferderber	3,857	66.68
28	Robert Bertha	1,897	32.80
29	Tim Brennan	Unopposed	
30	Arvind Venkat	Unopposed	
31	Perry Warren	Unopposed	
32	Joe McAndrew	Unopposed	
33	Mandy Steele	Unopposed	
34	Abigail Salisbury	Unopposed	
35	Dan Goughnour	Unopposed	
36	Jessica Benham	Unopposed	
37	Chad William Gleissl	Unopposed	
38	John Inglis	Unopposed	
39	Dylan Altemara	3,837	62.73
39	Kellianne Frketic	2,244	36.68
40	Jonathan C. Lloyd	Unopposed	
41	Bradford T. Chambers	Unopposed	
42	Jennifer Mazzocco	Unopposed	
43	Bryan K. Peirson	Unopposed	
44	Hadley Haas	Unopposed	
45	Brittany Bloam	5,236	63.08
45	Patrick J. Catena Jr.	3,034	36.55
46	Michael Crossey	Unopposed	
47	Edward Lee Ritter	Unopposed	
48	Rebecca Mactaggart	Unopposed	
49	Ismail Smith-Wade-El	Unopposed	
50	Lois Bower-Bjornson	Unopposed	
51	No candidate filed		
52	No candidate filed		
53	Steve Malagari	Unopposed	
54	Greg Scott	Unopposed	
55	Davon Tyrone Magwood	Unopposed	
56	No candidate filed		
57	Robert B. Frances	Unopposed	
58	Cherri Rogers	Unopposed	
59	Jordan Omlor	2,893	59.58
59	Lisa Gephert	1,930	39.74
60	Dustyn A. Dorn	Unopposed	
61	Liz Hanbidge	Unopposed	
62	Trajan William Jones	Unopposed	
63	Andrew L. Harbaugh	Unopposed	
64	Amanda Shaffer	Unopposed	
65	Destiny Kay Patricia Howard	Unopposed	
66	Lisa M. Gourley	Unopposed	
67	Zachary R. Ware	Unopposed	
68	Joseph Quentin Gee	Unopposed	
69	No candidate filed		
70	Matt Bradford	Unopposed	
71	No candidate filed		
72	Frank Burns	Unopposed	
73	No candidate filed		
74	Dan K. Williams	Unopposed	
75	Kimberly Kohlhepp	Unopposed	
76	Elizabeth Sara Eggler	Unopposed	
77	Scott Conklin	Unopposed	
78	No candidate filed		
79	Caleb McCoy	Unopposed	
80	Sarah Holland	Unopposed	
81	Caleb J. Donahue	Unopposed	
82	Paul Takac	Unopposed	
83	No candidate filed		
84	No candidate filed		
85	No candidate filed		
86	Wendy Morgan	Unopposed	
87	Jessica Lynne St. Clair	Unopposed	
88	Sara Agerton	Unopposed	
89	Shannon Michael Jackson	Unopposed	
90	No candidate filed		
91	Kathleen Pratt	2,676	60.07
91	Tony Nunez-Guzman	1,196	26.85
91	Darian Sundberg	555	12.46
92	Krista Jean Anderson	Unopposed	
93	Melissa Ann Barnes	Unopposed	
94	Konnor John-Richard Grimek	Unopposed	
95	Carol Hill-Evans	Unopposed	
96	Nikki Rivera	Unopposed	
97	Jessica Lee Branas	Unopposed	
98	Hugh Stockton Hyder-Darlington	Unopposed	
99	Ethan Gabrick	Unopposed	
100	No candidate filed		
101	No candidate filed		
102	Matt Duvall	328	63.69
103	Nate Davidson	Unopposed	
104	Dave Madsen	2,959	59.43
104	Shane Steele	2,008	40.33
105	Justin Fleming	Unopposed	
106	Anju Singh	2,809	51.53
106	Ryan Hazel	2,609	47.86
107	Ryan T. Coleman	Unopposed	
108	Amder L. Neidig	Unopposed	
109	Justin Hummel	Unopposed	
110	Pamela J. Hemann	Unopposed	
111	Kyle T. Devlin	Unopposed	
112	Kyle Mullins	Unopposed	
113	Kyle Donahue	Unopposed	
114	Bridget Malloy Kosierowski	Unopposed	
115	Maureen Madden	Unopposed	
116	No candidate filed		
117	Jeremy Benscoter	Unopposed	
118	Jim Haddock	Unopposed	
119	Lauren Elizabeth McCurdy	Unopposed	
120	Fern Leard	3,502	57.13
120	Joanna Bryn Smith	2,581	42.10
121	Jessica McClay	2,661	61.91
121	Michael Stadulis	1,631	37.95
122	Christian Bartulovich	483	41.04
123	John A. Deatrich Jr.	Unopposed	
124	Tina M. Burns	Unopposed	
125	Kathryn L. Waters	Unopposed	
126	Jacklyn Rusnock	3,292	85.20
126	Joshua Caltagirone	567	14.67
127	Manny Guzman Jr.	Unopposed	
128	Andrew Wagner	Unopposed	
129	Johanny Cepeda-Freytiz	Unopposed	
130	Eric Bonnett	Unopposed	
131	Meriam Sabih	Unopposed	
132	Michael Schlossberg	Unopposed	
133	Jeanne McNeill	Unopposed	
134	Peter Schweyer	Unopposed	
135	Steve Samuelson	Unopposed	
136	Robert L. Freeman	Unopposed	
137	Jeff Warren	Unopposed	
138	Jared Bitting	Unopposed	
139	Dominique N. Azzollini	Unopposed	
140	Jim Prokopiak	Unopposed	
141	Tina Davis	Unopposed	
142	Kristin Egan	Unopposed	
143	Tim Hayes	Unopposed	
144	Brian Munroe	Unopposed	
145	Les Mavus	Unopposed	
146	Joe Ciresi	Unopposed	
147	Margaret Burke	Unopposed	
148	Megan Griffin-Shelley	4,917	37.44
148	Jason Landau Goodman	4,812	36.64
148	Leo Solga	1,870	14.24
148	Andrea Deutsch	1,534	11.68
149	Tim Briggs	Unopposed	
150	Joe Webster	Unopposed	
151	Melissa Cerrato	Unopposed	
152	Nancy Guenst	Unopposed	
153	Ben Sanchez	Unopposed	
154	Napoleon Nelson	Unopposed	
155	Danielle Friel Otten	Unopposed	
156	Chris Pielli	Unopposed	
157	Melissa Shusterman	Unopposed	
158	Christina Sappey	Unopposed	
159	Carol Kazeem	3,569	77.79
159	Brian Kirkland	1,012	22.06
160	Elizabeth Moro	Unopposed	
161	Leanne Krueger	Unopposed	
162	David Delloso	Unopposed	
163	Heather Boyd	Unopposed	
164	Gina Curry	Unopposed	
165	Jennifer O'Mara	Unopposed	
166	Judy Trombetta	5,867	61.72
166	Greg Vitali	3,627	38.15
167	Kristine Howard	Unopposed	
168	Lisa Borowski	Unopposed	
169	Austin L. Graham	Unopposed	
170	Robert N. Gurtcheff II	Unopposed	
171	John R. Zangari	Unopposed	
172	Sean Dougherty	Unopposed	
173	Pat Gallagher	Unopposed	
174	Ed Neilson	Unopposed	
175	Mary Isaacson	Unopposed	
176	Thomas Kucer	1,327	79.08
177	Joseph Hohenstein	Unopposed	
178	Monica Weninger	Unopposed	
179	Jason Dawkins	Unopposed	
180	Jose Giral	Unopposed	
181	Malcolm Kenyatta	Unopposed	
182	Ben Waxman	Unopposed	
183	Deirdre J. Kamber	Unopposed	
184	Elizabeth Fiedler	Unopposed	
185	Regina Young	5,391	82.18
185	Joe Sackor	1,153	17.58
186	Jordan A. Harris	Unopposed	
187	Rachel Cuevas	4,181	68.23
187	Geoffrey S. Whitcomb	1,947	31.77
188	Rick Krajewski	Unopposed	
189	Tarah Probst	Unopposed	
190	G. Roni Green	Unopposed	
191	Joanna McClinton	Unopposed	
192	Morgan Cephas	9,356	86.61
192	D'Angelo Virgo	1,428	13.22
193	Todd Crawley	946	89.92
194	Tarik Khan	Unopposed	
195	Sierra McNeil	5,821	53.95
195	Keith Harris	2,891	26.80
195	Kenneth T. Walker Jr.	2,065	19.14
196	Ronald Ruman	Unopposed	
197	Danilo Burgos	Unopposed	
198	Darisha Parker	Unopposed	
199	Tawanda Hunter Stallworth	3,087	63.43
199	Rick Christie	1,780	36.57
200	Chris Johnson	11,773	61.40
200	Deshawnda Williams	4,356	22.72
200	Qasim Rashad	3,023	15.77
201	Andre Carroll	Unopposed	
202	Jared Solomon	Unopposed	
203	Anthony A. Bellmon	Unopposed	

=== Republican primary ===
2026 Pennsylvania House of Representatives elections Republican primary
District	Candidates	Votes	Percent
1	No candidate filed		
2	Bob Merski	365	48.47
3	Donna Reese	Unopposed	
4	Jacob Banta	Unopposed	
5	Eric Weaknecht	Unopposed	
6	Brad Roae	Unopposed	
7	Parke Wentling	Unopposed	
8	Aaron Bernstine	Unopposed	
9	Marla Brown	Unopposed	
10	No candidate filed		
11	Marci Mustello	Unopposed	
12	Scott Timko	3,207	51.17
12	Ethan Nicholas	2,988	47.68
13	John Lawrence	Unopposed	
14	Roman Kozak	Unopposed	
15	Joshua Kail	Unopposed	
16	John Costanza	Unopposed	
17	Timothy Bonner	Unopposed	
18	Kathleen Tomlinson	Unopposed	
19	No candidate filed		
20	Joseph Aguglia	845	85.79
21	No candidate filed		
22	Robert Smith Jr.	Unopposed	
23	No candidate filed		
24	No candidate filed		
25	Amy Noone	Unopposed	
26	Samantha L. Horosky	1,371	85.37
27	Ed Brosky	691	82.46
28	Jeremy Shaffer	Unopposed	
29	Sean Duffy	Unopposed	
30	Libby Blackburn	2,689	82.81
31	No candidate filed		
32	Gary Motor	796	82.15
33	Michael Hammill	Unopposed	
34	No candidate filed		
35	James Edwards	Unopposed	
36	Timothy McCune	Unopposed	
37	Melinda Fee	Unopposed	
38	Stone Sobieralski	371	67.09
39	Andrew Kuzma	Unopposed	
40	Natalie Stuck	Unopposed	
41	Brett Miller	Unopposed	
42	No candidate filed		
43	Keith Greiner	Unopposed	
44	Valerie Gaydos	Unopposed	
45	James Julius	Unopposed	
46	Jason Ortitay	Unopposed	
47	Joseph D'Orsie	Unopposed	
48	Timothy O'Neal	Unopposed	
49	Venessa Acosta	Unopposed	
50	Ben Humble	3,327	54.93
50	Bud Cook	2,730	45.07
51	Charity Grimm Krupa	Unopposed	
52	Ryan Warner	Unopposed	
53	Yanni Lambros	1,437	91.30
54	No candidate filed		
55	Jill Cooper	Unopposed	
56	Brian Rasel	Unopposed	
57	Eric Nelson	Unopposed	
58	Eric Davanzo	Unopposed	
59	Leslie Rossi	Unopposed	
60	Abigail Major	Unopposed	
61	Angela Illingworth	907	74.04
62	James Struzzi	Unopposed	
63	Joshua Bashline	Unopposed	
64	Robert James	Unopposed	
65	Kathy Rapp	Unopposed	
66	Brian Smith	Unopposed	
67	Martin Causer	Unopposed	
68	Clinton Owlett	Unopposed	
69	Carl Metzgar	Unopposed	
70	Chris Martino	1,079	83.90
71	James Rigby	Unopposed	
72	Philip Rice	Unopposed	
73	Dallas Kephart	Unopposed	
74	Lorenzo Kelly	Unopposed	
75	Michael Armanini	Unopposed	
76	Stephanie Borowicz	Unopposed	
77	Michelle Schellberg	Unopposed	
78	Jesse Topper	Unopposed	
79	Andrea Verobish	Unopposed	
80	Scott Barger	Unopposed	
81	Richard Irvin	Unopposed	
82	Kirsten McTernan	Unopposed	
83	Jamie Flick	Unopposed	
84	Joseph Hamm	Unopposed	
85	David Rowe	Unopposed	
86	Perry Stambaugh	Unopposed	
87	Thomas Kutz	Unopposed	
88	Jeff Clark	2,791	50.65
88	Savannah Martin	2,719	49.35
89	Robert Kauffman	Unopposed	
90	Chad Reichard	Unopposed	
91	Dan Moul	4,180	61.32
91	Nick Lovell	2,159	31.67
91	Lindsay Krug	439	6.44
92	Marc Anderson	Unopposed	
93	Michael Jones	Unopposed	
94	Wendy Fink	Unopposed	
95	Jasmine Rivera	Unopposed	
96	Babita Rusyn	Unopposed	
97	Steven Mentzer	Unopposed	
98	Nicky Woods	5,986	77.75
98	Danielle Lindemuth	1,626	21.12
99	David Zimmerman	Unopposed	
100	Dave Nissley	3,740	56.00
100	Kelly Osborne	2,925	43.80
101	John Schlegel	Unopposed	
102	Russel Diamond	Unopposed	
103	Cindi Ward	466	74.20
104	No candidate filed		
105	No candidate filed		
106	Thomas Mehaffie	Unopposed	
107	Joanne Stehr	Unopposed	
108	Michael Stender Jr.	Unopposed	
109	Robert Leadbeter	Unopposed	
110	Tina Pickett	Unopposed	
111	Jonathan Fritz	Unopposed	
112	Joseph Sabia Jr.	Unopposed	
113	Lucas O'Brien	Unopposed	
114	Logan Lombardo	1,674	65.24
114	David Burgerhoff	861	33.55
115	Richard Szabo	Unopposed	
116	Dane Watro Jr.	Unopposed	
117	Jamie Walsh	6,120	72.01
117	Bill Jones	2,365	27.83
118	John Lombardo	Unopposed	
119	Alec Ryncavage	Unopposed	
120	Brenda Pugh	Unopposed	
121	Michael Harostock III	Unopposed	
122	Doyle Heffley	Unopposed	
123	Timothy Twardzik	Unopposed	
124	James Barton	Unopposed	
125	Joseph Kerwin	Unopposed	
126	Miguel Vasquez	Unopposed	
127	No candidate filed		
128	Mark Gillen	3,499	71.55
128	David Hughes	1,366	27.93
129	No candidate filed		
130	Melissa Brewer	3,668	63.22
130	Mitch Micale	2,110	36.37
131	Milou Mackenzie	Unopposed	
132	Caren Lowrey	Unopposed	
133	No candidate filed		
134	Miriam Alicia Maldonado	Unopposed	
135	Joseph F. Poplawski	Unopposed	
136	Pilar M. Campisi	Unopposed	
137	Joe Emrick	Unopposed	
138	Ann Flood	Unopposed	
139	Jeff Olsommer	Unopposed	
140	Michael J. Gettis	Unopposed	
141	Kenneth James Velez	Unopposed	
142	Joe Hogan	Unopposed	
143	Shelby Labs	Unopposed	
144	Michael J. Murphy	Unopposed	
145	Craig Staats	Unopposed	
146	Jeffrey T. Fartro	356	56.42
147	Donna Scheuren	Unopposed	
148	No candidate filed		
149	No candidate filed		
150	Frank Pastella	687	75.08
151	Allen Arthur Anderson	647	75.85
152	Eric Maier	965	83.86
153	Cory L. Toner	Unopposed	
154	No candidate filed		
155	Greer Heindel	1,223	83.14
156	Kris R. Vollrath	Unopposed	
157	Justin J. Pak	Unopposed	
158	Tina Louise Ayala	969	83.18
159	Mike Bannon	316	63.97
160	Craig Williams	Unopposed	
161	John Mancinelli Jr.	1,451	79.25
162	Michael E. Murphy	Unopposed	
163	No candidate filed		
164	No candidate filed		
165	Deirdre D. McCleary	Unopposed	
166	Joseph William Walker	Unopposed	
167	Joseph M Lewis	Unopposed	
168	Kathryn M.L. Buckley	Unopposed	
169	Kate Klunk	Unopposed	
170	Martina White	Unopposed	
171	Kerry Benninghoff	Unopposed	
172	Wallace J. Quinlan	Unopposed	
173	William J. Griffin Jr.	Unopposed	
174	No candidate filed		
175	No candidate filed		
176	Jack Rader	Unopposed	
177	Robyn L. Bird	Unopposed	
178	Kristin Marcell	Unopposed	
179	No candidate filed		
180	No candidate filed		
181	No candidate filed		
182	No candidate filed		
183	Zach Mako	Unopposed	
184	No candidate filed		
185	No candidate filed		
186	No candidate filed		
187	Gary Day	Unopposed	
188	No candidate filed		
189	Danica L. Hartenfels	Unopposed	
190	No candidate filed		
191	No candidate filed		
192	Tiffany Brown	Unoppsed	
193	Catherine Wallen	Unopposed	
194	No candidate filed		
195	No candidate filed		
196	George Margetas	Unopposed	
197	No candidate filed		
198	No candidate filed		
199	Barbara Gleim	Unopposed	
200	No candidate filed		
201	No candidate filed		
202	No candidate filed		
203	No candidate filed		

== General election ==
=== Predictions ===
Source	Ranking	As of
Sabato's Crystal Ball	Likely D	October 16, 2026
State Navigate	Lean D	August 27, 2026

=== Overview ===
Affiliation	Candidates	Votes	Vote %	Seats Won
Democratic	187			
Republican	162			
Independent	5			
Total				

=== District breakdown ===
District	Party	Incumbent	Status	Party	Candidate	Votes	%
1	Democratic	Pat Harkins	Reelected	Democratic	Pat Harkins	13,875	100.0%
2	Democratic	Bob Merski (Note: Representative Bob Merski ran as a Democrat, but will appear on the ballot as both a Democrat and a Republican after also winning the Republican nomination via write-in votes.)	Reelected	Democratic	Bob Merski	20,214	100.0%
3	Democratic	Ryan Bizzarro	Reelected	Democratic	Ryan Bizzarro	18,327	65.5%
3	Democratic	Ryan Bizzarro	Reelected	Republican	Donna Reese	9,633	34.5%
4	Republican	Jake Banta	Reelected	Republican	Jake Banta	14,156	59.2%
4	Republican	Jake Banta	Reelected	Democratic	Kathryn A. Divittorio	9,769	40.8%
5	Republican	Eric Weaknecht	Reelected	Republican	Eric Weaknecht	15,534	60.9%
5	Republican	Eric Weaknecht	Reelected	Democratic	Andres Ruben Flammer Santiago	9,978	39.1%
6	Republican	Brad Roae	Reelected	Republican	Brad Roae	14,324	63.2%
6	Republican	Brad Roae	Reelected	Democratic	Michael C. Walker	8,354	36.8%
7	Republican	Parke Wentling	Reelected	Republican	Parke Wentling	12,770	56.9%
7	Republican	Parke Wentling	Reelected	Democratic	Chris Ford	9,661	43.1%
8	Republican	Aaron Bernstine	Reelected	Republican	Aaron Bernstine	18,460	62.9%
8	Republican	Aaron Bernstine	Reelected	Democratic	Richard E. Telesz	10,874	37.1%
9	Republican	Marla Brown	Reelected	Republican	Marla Brown	13,750	61.6%
9	Republican	Marla Brown	Reelected	Democratic	Shay Micco	8,585	38.4%
10	Democratic	Amen Brown	Reelected	Democratic	Amen Brown	17,426	100.0%
11	Republican	Marci Mustello	Reelected	Republican	Marci Mustello	19,427	100.0%
12	Democratic	Brandon Dukes	Defeated	Democratic	Brandon Dukes	16,088	49.2%
12	Democratic	Brandon Dukes	Defeated	Republican	Scott Timko	16,634	50.8%
13	Republican	John Lawrence	Defeated	Republican	John Lawrence	13,187	48.7%
13	Republican	John Lawrence	Defeated	Democratic	Madelyn Alvarino	13,907	51.3%
14	Republican	Roman Kozak	Reelected	Republican	Roman Kozak	14,925	57.9%
14	Republican	Roman Kozak	Reelected	Democratic	Bradley Jacob Young	10,859	42.1%
15	Republican	Josh Kail	Reelected	Republican	Josh Kail	15,976	62.1%
15	Republican	Josh Kail	Reelected	Democratic	Sydney Louise Speicher	9,752	37.9%
16	Democratic	Robert Matzie	Reelected	Democratic	Robert Matzie	14,606	60.8%
16	Democratic	Robert Matzie	Reelected	Republican	John Costanza	9,428	39.2%
17	Republican	Tim Bonner	Reelected	Republican	Tim Bonner	18,266	100.0%
18	Republican	K.C. Tomlinson	Defeated	Republican	K.C. Tomlinson	10,832	45.0%
18	Republican	K.C. Tomlinson	Defeated	Democratic	Bryan Allen	13,234	55.0%
19	Democratic	Aerion Abney	Reelected	Democratic	Aerion Abney	16,495	100.0%
20	Democratic	Emily Kinkead	Reelected	Democratic	Emily Kinkead	18,484	68.8%
20	Democratic	Emily Kinkead	Reelected	Republican	Joseph Aguglia	8,382	31.2%
21	Democratic	Lindsay Powell	Reelected	Democratic	Lindsay Powell	23,131	100.0%
22	Democratic	Ana Tiburcio	Lost primary election	Democratic	Ce-Ce Gerlach	7,969	70.8%
22	Democratic	Ana Tiburcio	Lost primary election	Republican	Robert Smith Jr.	3,283	29.2%
23	Democratic	Dan Frankel	Reelected	Democratic	Dan Frankel	23,319	100.0%
24	Democratic	La'Tasha D. Mayes	Reelected	Democratic	La'Tasha D. Mayes	21,714	100.0%
25	Democratic	Brandon Markosek	Reelected	Democratic	Brandon Markosek	16,809	67.4%
25	Democratic	Brandon Markosek	Reelected	Republican	Amy Noone	8,133	32.6%
26	Democratic	Paul Friel	Reelected	Democratic	Paul Friel	19,584	65.2%
26	Democratic	Paul Friel	Reelected	Republican	Samantha L. Horosky	10,442	34.8%
27	Democratic	Dan Deasy	Reelected	Democratic	Dan Deasy	20,015	100.0%
28	Republican	Jeremy Shaffer	Reelected	Republican	Jeremy Shaffer	16,330	52.6%
28	Republican	Jeremy Shaffer	Reelected	Democratic	Jeremy Ferderber	14,697	47.4%
29	Democratic	Tim Brennan	Reelected	Democratic	Tim Brennan	23,537	63.4%
29	Democratic	Tim Brennan	Reelected	Republican	Sean Duffy	13,574	36.6%
30	Democratic	Arvind Venkat	Reelected	Democratic	Arvind Venkat	19,547	63.4%
30	Democratic	Arvind Venkat	Reelected	Republican	Libby Blackburn	11,310	36.6%
31	Democratic	Perry Warren	Reelected	Democratic	Perry Warren	28,113	100.0%
32	Democratic	Joe McAndrew	Reelected	Democratic	Joe McAndrew	20,094	75.5%
32	Democratic	Joe McAndrew	Reelected	Republican	Gary Motor	6,507	24.5%
33	Democratic	Mandy Steele	Reelected	Democratic	Mandy Steele	16,939	64.5%
33	Democratic	Mandy Steele	Reelected	Republican	Michael Hammill	9,301	35.5%
34	Democratic	Abigail Salisbury	Reelected	Democratic	Abigail Salisbury	24,193	100.0%
35	Democratic	Dan Goughnour	Reelected	Democratic	Dan Goughnour	14,409	70.5%
35	Democratic	Dan Goughnour	Reelected	Republican	James Edwards	6,014	29.4%
36	Democratic	Jessica Benham	Reelected	Democratic	Jessica Benham	17,094	77.8%
36	Democratic	Jessica Benham	Reelected	Republican	Timothy McCune	4,885	22.2%
37	Republican	Mindy Fee	Reelected	Republican	Mindy Fee	19,357	62.1%
37	Republican	Mindy Fee	Reelected	Democratic	Chad William Gleissl	11,828	37.9%
38	Democratic	John Inglis	Reelected	Democratic	John Inglis	16,407	65.7%
38	Democratic	John Inglis	Reelected	Republican	Stone Sobieralski	8,582	34.3%
39	Republican	Andrew Kuzma	Reelected	Republican	Andrew Kuzma	14,539	53.4%
39	Republican	Andrew Kuzma	Reelected	Democratic	Dylan Altemara	12,693	46.6%
40	Republican	Natalie Mihalek	Reelected	Republican	Natalie Mihalek	16,777	51.5%
40	Republican	Natalie Mihalek	Reelected	Democratic	Jon Lloyd	15,822	48.5%
41	Republican	Brett Miller	Recount pending	Republican	Brett Miller	14,263	50.0%
41	Republican	Brett Miller	Recount pending	Democratic	Bradford T. Chambers	14,291	50.0%
42	Democratic	Jen Mazzocco	Reelected	Democratic	Jen Mazzocco	24,714	100.0%
43	Republican	Keith Greiner	Reelected	Republican	Keith Greiner	13,877	64.6%
43	Republican	Keith Greiner	Reelected	Democratic	Bryan K. Peirson	7,595	35.4%
44	Republican	Valerie Gaydos	Defeated	Republican	Valerie Gaydos	13,471	46.7%
44	Republican	Valerie Gaydos	Defeated	Democratic	Hadley Haas	15,357	53.3%
45	Democratic	Anita Kulik	Retired	Democratic	Brittany Bloam	15,394	59.7%
45	Democratic	Anita Kulik	Retired	Republican	James Julius	10,375	40.3%
46	Republican	Jason Ortitay	Reelected	Republican	Jason Ortitay	14,917	52.5%
46	Republican	Jason Ortitay	Reelected	Democratic	Michael Crossey	13,480	47.5%
47	Republican	Joe D'Orsie	Reelected	Republican	Joe D'Orsie	14,862	55.0%
47	Republican	Joe D'Orsie	Reelected	Democratic	Edward Lee Ritter	12,159	45.0%
48	Republican	Tim O'Neal	Reelected	Republican	Tim O'Neal	14,169	56.7%
48	Republican	Tim O'Neal	Reelected	Democratic	Rebecca Mactaggart	10,836	43.3%
49	Democratic	Ismail Smith-Wade-El	Reelected	Democratic	Ismail Smith-Wade-El	12,308	74.3%
49	Democratic	Ismail Smith-Wade-El	Reelected	Republican	Venessa Acosta	4,265	25.7%
50	Republican	Bud Cook	Lost primary election	Republican	Ben Humble	12,735	62.1%
50	Republican	Bud Cook	Lost primary election	Democratic	Lois Bower-Bjornson	7,768	37.9%
51	Republican	Charity Grimm Krupa	Reelected	Republican	Charity Grimm Krupa	13,227	100.0%
52	Republican	Ryan Warner	Reelected	Republican	Ryan Warner	14,709	100.0%
53	Democratic	Steve Malagari	Reelected	Democratic	Steve Malagari	18,783	67.9%
53	Democratic	Steve Malagari	Reelected	Republican	Yanni Lambros	8,862	32.1%
54	Democratic	Greg Scott	Reelected	Democratic	Greg Scott	16,196	100.0%
55	Republican	Jill Cooper	Reelected	Republican	Jill Cooper	16,571	60.6%
55	Republican	Jill Cooper	Reelected	Democratic	Davon Tyrone Magwood	10,772	39.4%
56	Republican	Brian Rasel	Reelected	Republican	Brian Rasel	19,256	100.0%
57	Republican	Eric Nelson	Reelected	Republican	Eric Nelson	15,382	58.0%
57	Republican	Eric Nelson	Reelected	Democratic	Robert B. Frances	11,122	42.0%
58	Republican	Eric Davanzo	Reelected	Republican	Eric Davanzo	15,051	60.6%
58	Republican	Eric Davanzo	Reelected	Democratic	Cherri Rogers	9,795	39.4%
59	Republican	Leslie Rossi	Reelected	Republican	Leslie Rossi	16,515	61.5%
59	Republican	Leslie Rossi	Reelected	Democratic	Jordan Omlor	10,341	38.5%
60	Republican	Abby Major	Reelected	Republican	Abby Major	15,762	65.5%
60	Republican	Abby Major	Reelected	Democratic	Dustyn A. Dorn	8,287	34.5%
61	Democratic	Liz Hanbidge	Reelected	Democratic	Liz Hanbidge	22,575	68.7%
61	Democratic	Liz Hanbidge	Reelected	Republican	Angela Illingworth	10,297	31.3%
62	Republican	James Struzzi	Reelected	Republican	James Struzzi	14,051	62.9%
62	Republican	James Struzzi	Reelected	Democratic	Trajan William Jones	8,294	37.1%
63	Republican	Josh Bashline	Reelected	Republican	Josh Bashline	16,962	74.9%
63	Republican	Josh Bashline	Reelected	Democratic	Andrew L. Harbaugh	5,679	25.1%
64	Republican	Lee James	Reelected	Republican	Lee James	14,762	68.9%
64	Republican	Lee James	Reelected	Democratic	Amanda Shaffer	6,671	31.1%
65	Republican	Kathy Rapp	Reelected	Republican	Kathy Rapp		
65	Republican	Kathy Rapp	Reelected	Democratic	Destiny Kay Patricia Howard		
66	Republican	Brian Smith	Reelected	Republican	Brian Smith		
66	Republican	Brian Smith	Reelected	Democratic	Lisa M. Gourley		
67	Republican	Martin Causer	Reelected	Republican	Martin Causer		
67	Republican	Martin Causer	Reelected	Democratic	Zachary R. Ware		
68	Republican	Clint Owlett	Reelected	Republican	Clint Owlett		
68	Republican	Clint Owlett	Reelected	Democratic	Joseph Quentin Gee		
69	Republican	Carl Walker Metzgar	Reelected	Republican	Carl Walker Metzgar		
70	Democratic	Matthew Bradford	Reelected	Democratic	Matthew Bradford		
70	Democratic	Matthew Bradford	Reelected	Republican	Chris Martino		
71	Republican	Jim Rigby	Reelected	Republican	Jim Rigby		
72	Democratic	Frank Burns	Reelected	Democratic	Frank Burns		
72	Democratic	Frank Burns	Reelected	Republican	Philip Rice		
73	Republican	Dallas Kephart	Reelected	Republican	Dallas Kephart		
74	Democratic	Dan K. Williams	Reelected	Democratic	Dan K. Williams		
74	Democratic	Dan K. Williams	Reelected	Republican	Lorenzo Kelly		
75	Republican	Michael Armanini	Reelected	Republican	Michael Armanini		
75	Republican	Michael Armanini	Reelected	Democratic	Kimberly Kohlhepp		
76	Republican	Stephanie Borowicz	Reelected	Republican	Stephanie Borowicz		
76	Republican	Stephanie Borowicz	Reelected	Democratic	Elizabeth Sara Eggler		
77	Democratic	Scott Conklin	Reelected	Democratic	Scott Conklin		
77	Democratic	Scott Conklin	Reelected	Republican	Michelle Schellberg		
78	Republican	Jesse Topper	Reelected	Republican	Jesse Topper		
79	Republican	Andrea Verobish	Reelected	Republican	Andrea Verobish		
79	Republican	Andrea Verobish	Reelected	Democratic	Caleb McCoy		
80	Republican	Scott Barger	Reelected	Republican	Scott Barger		
80	Republican	Scott Barger	Reelected	Democratic	Sarah Holland		
81	Republican	Rich Irvin	Reelected	Republican	Rich Irvin		
81	Republican	Rich Irvin	Reelected	Democratic	Caleb J. Donahue		
82	Democratic	Paul Takac	Reelected	Democratic	Paul Takac		
82	Democratic	Paul Takac	Reelected	Republican	Kirsten McTernan		
83	Republican	Jamie Flick	Reelected	Republican	Jamie Flick		
84	Republican	Joe Hamm	Reelected	Republican	Joe Hamm		
85	Republican	David H. Rowe	Reelected	Republican	David H. Rowe		
86	Republican	Perry A. Stambaugh	Reelected	Republican	Perry Stambaugh		
86	Republican	Perry A. Stambaugh	Reelected	Democratic	Wendy Morgan		
87	Republican	Thomas Kutz	Reelected	Republican	Thomas Kutz		
87	Republican	Thomas Kutz	Reelected	Democratic	Jessica Lynne St. Clair		
88	Republican	Sheryl M. Delozier	Retired	Republican	Jeff Clark		
88	Republican	Sheryl M. Delozier	Retired	Democratic	Sara Agerton		
89	Republican	Rob Kauffman	Reelected	Republican	Rob Kauffman		
89	Republican	Rob Kauffman	Reelected	Democratic	Shannon Michael Jackson		
90	Republican	Chad Reichard	Reelected	Republican	Chad Reichard		
91	Republican	Dan Moul	Reelected	Republican	Dan Moul		
91	Republican	Dan Moul	Reelected	Democratic	Kathleen Pratt		
92	Republican	Marc Anderson	Reelected	Republican	Marc Anderson		
92	Republican	Marc Anderson	Reelected	Democratic	Krista Jean Anderson		
93	Republican	Mike Jones	Reelected	Republican	Mike Jones		
93	Republican	Mike Jones	Reelected	Democratic	Melissa Ann Barnes		
94	Republican	Wendy Fink	Reelected	Republican	Wendy Fink		
94	Republican	Wendy Fink	Reelected	Democratic	Konnor John-Richard Grimek		
95	Democratic	Carol Hill-Evans	Reelected	Democratic	Carol Hill-Evans		
95	Democratic	Carol Hill-Evans	Reelected	Republican	Jasmine Rivera		
96	Democratic	Nikki Rivera	Reelected	Democratic	Nikki Rivera		
96	Democratic	Nikki Rivera	Reelected	Republican	Babita Rusyn		
97	Republican	Steven Mentzer	Reelected	Republican	Steven Mentzer		
97	Republican	Steven Mentzer	Reelected	Democratic	Jessica Lee Branas		
98	Republican	Tom Jones	Retired (running for State Senate)	Republican	Nicky Woods		
98	Republican	Tom Jones	Retired (running for State Senate)	Democratic	Hugh Stockton Hyder-Darlington		
98	Republican	Tom Jones	Retired (running for State Senate)	Independent	Joshua L. Deering		
99	Republican	David H. Zimmerman	Reelected	Republican	David H. Zimmerman		
99	Republican	David H. Zimmerman	Reelected	Democratic	Ethan Gabrick		
100	Republican	Bryan Cutler	Retired	Republican	Dave Nissley		
100	Republican	Bryan Cutler	Retired	Independent	Dale Allen Hamby		
101	Republican	John A. Schlegel	Reelected	Republican	John A. Schlegel		
102	Republican	Russ Diamond	Reelected	Republican	Russ Diamond		
102	Republican	Russ Diamond	Reelected	Democratic	Matt Duvall		
103	Democratic	Nate Davidson	Reelected	Democratic	Nate Davidson		
103	Democratic	Nate Davidson	Reelected	Republican	Cindi Ward		
104	Democratic	Dave Madsen	Reelected	Democratic	Dave Madsen		
105	Democratic	Justin C. Fleming	Reelected	Democratic	Justin C. Fleming		
106	Republican	Tom Mehaffie	Reelected	Republican	Tom Mehaffie		
106	Republican	Tom Mehaffie	Reelected	Democratic	Anju Singh		
107	Republican	Joanne Stehr	Reelected	Republican	Joanne Stehr		
107	Republican	Joanne Stehr	Reelected	Democratic	Ryan T. Coleman		
108	Republican	Michael Stender	Reelected	Republican	Michael Stender		
108	Republican	Michael Stender	Reelected	Democratic	Amber L. Neidig		
109	Republican	Robert Leadbeter	Reelected	Republican	Robert Leadbeter		
109	Republican	Robert Leadbeter	Reelected	Democratic	Justin Hummel		
110	Republican	Tina Pickett	Reelected	Republican	Tina Pickett		
110	Republican	Tina Pickett	Reelected	Democratic	Pamela J. Hemann		
111	Republican	Jonathan Fritz	Reelected	Republican	Jonathan Fritz		
111	Republican	Jonathan Fritz	Reelected	Democratic	Kyle T. Devlin		
112	Democratic	Kyle Mullins	Reelected	Democratic	Kyle Mullins		
112	Democratic	Kyle Mullins	Reelected	Republican	Joseph Sabia		
113	Democratic	Kyle Donahue	Reelected	Democratic	Kyle Donahue		
113	Democratic	Kyle Donahue	Reelected	Republican	Lucas O'Brien		
114	Democratic	Bridget Malloy Kosierowski	Reelected	Democratic	Bridget Malloy Kosierowski		
114	Democratic	Bridget Malloy Kosierowski	Reelected	Republican	Logan Lombardo		
115	Democratic	Maureen Madden	Reelected	Democratic	Maureen Madden		
115	Democratic	Maureen Madden	Reelected	Republican	Richard Szabo		
116	Republican	Dane Watro	Reelected	Republican	Dane Watro		
117	Republican	Jamie Walsh	Reelected	Republican	Jamie Walsh		
117	Republican	Jamie Walsh	Reelected	Democratic	Jeremy Benscoter		
118	Democratic	Jim Haddock	Reelected	Democratic	Jim Haddock		
118	Democratic	Jim Haddock	Reelected	Republican	John Lombardo		
119	Republican	Alec Ryncavage	Reelected	Republican	Alec Ryncavage		
119	Republican	Alec Ryncavage	Reelected	Democratic	Lauren Elizabeth McCurdy		
120	Republican	Brenda Pugh	Reelected	Republican	Brenda Pugh		
120	Republican	Brenda Pugh	Reelected	Democratic	Fern Leard		
121	Democratic	Eddie Day Pashinski	Retired	Democratic	Jessica McClay		
121	Democratic	Eddie Day Pashinski	Retired	Republican	Mike Harostock III		
122	Republican	Doyle Heffley	Reelected	Republican	Doyle Heffley		
122	Republican	Doyle Heffley	Reelected	Democratic	Christian Bartulovich		
123	Republican	Timothy Twardzik	Reelected	Republican	Timothy Twardzik		
123	Republican	Timothy Twardzik	Reelected	Democratic	John A. Deatrich Jr.		
124	Republican	Jamie Barton	Reelected	Republican	Jamie Barton		
124	Republican	Jamie Barton	Reelected	Democratic	Tina M. Burns		
125	Republican	Joe Kerwin	Reelected	Republican	Joe Kerwin		
125	Republican	Joe Kerwin	Reelected	Democratic	Kathryn L. Waters		
126	Democratic	Jacklyn Rusnock	Reelected	Democratic	Jacklyn Rusnock		
126	Democratic	Jacklyn Rusnock	Reelected	Republican	Miguel Vasquez		
127	Democratic	Manny Guzman Jr.	Reelected	Democratic	Manny Guzman Jr.		
128	Republican	Mark M. Gillen	Reelected	Republican	Mark M. Gillen		
128	Republican	Mark M. Gillen	Reelected	Democratic	Andrew Wagner		
129	Democratic	Johanny Cepeda-Freytiz	Reelected	Democratic	Johanny Cepeda-Freytiz		
130	Republican	David Maloney	Retired	Republican	Melissa Brewer		
130	Republican	David Maloney	Retired	Democratic	Eric Bonnett		
131	Republican	Milou Mackenzie	Defeated	Republican	Milou Mackenzie		
131	Republican	Milou Mackenzie	Defeated	Democratic	Meriam Sabih		
132	Democratic	Mike Schlossberg	Reelected	Democratic	Mike Schlossberg		
132	Democratic	Mike Schlossberg	Reelected	Republican	Caren Lowry		
133	Democratic	Jeanne McNeill	Reelected	Democratic	Jeanne McNeill		
134	Democratic	Peter Schweyer	Reelected	Democratic	Peter Schweyer		
134	Democratic	Peter Schweyer	Reelected	Republican	Miriam Alicia Maldonado		
135	Democratic	Steve Samuelson	Reelected	Democratic	Steve Samuelson		
135	Democratic	Steve Samuelson	Reelected	Republican	Joseph F. Poplawski		
136	Democratic	Robert L. Freeman	Reelected	Democratic	Robert L. Freeman		
136	Democratic	Robert L. Freeman	Reelected	Republican	Pilar M. Campisi		
137	Republican	Joe Emrick	Defeated	Republican	Joe Emrick		
137	Republican	Joe Emrick	Defeated	Democratic	Jeff Warren		
138	Republican	Ann Flood	Reelected	Republican	Ann Flood		
138	Republican	Ann Flood	Reelected	Democratic	Jared Bitting		
139	Republican	Jeff Olsommer	Reelected	Republican	Jeff Olsommer		
139	Republican	Jeff Olsommer	Reelected	Democratic	Dominique N. Azzollini		
140	Democratic	Jim Prokopiak	Reelected	Democratic	Jim Prokopiak		
140	Democratic	Jim Prokopiak	Reelected	Republican	Michael J. Gettis		
141	Democratic	Tina Davis	Reelected	Democratic	Tina Davis		
141	Democratic	Tina Davis	Reelected	Republican	Kenneth James Velez		
142	Republican	Joe Hogan	Defeated	Republican	Joe Hogan		
142	Republican	Joe Hogan	Defeated	Democratic	Kristin Egan		
143	Republican	Shelby Labs	Defeated	Democratic	Tim Hayes		
143	Republican	Shelby Labs	Defeated	Republican	Shelby Labs		
143	Republican	Shelby Labs	Defeated	Forward Independent	Christopher D. Gambino		
144	Democratic	Brian Munroe	Reelected	Democratic	Brian Munroe		
144	Democratic	Brian Munroe	Reelected	Republican	Michael J. Murphy		
145	Republican	Craig Staats	Reelected	Republican	Craig Staats		
145	Republican	Craig Staats	Reelected	Democratic	Les Mavus		
146	Democratic	Joe Ciresi	Reelected	Democratic	Joe Ciresi		
146	Democratic	Joe Ciresi	Reelected	Republican	Jeffrey T. Fartro		
147	Republican	Donna Scheuren	Defeated	Democratic	Margaret Burke		
147	Republican	Donna Scheuren	Defeated	Republican	Donna Scheuren		
148	Democratic	Mary Jo Daley	Retired	Democratic	Megan Griffin-Shelley		
148	Democratic	Mary Jo Daley	Retired	Independent	Rebecca Catherine Prendergast		
149	Democratic	Tim Briggs	Reelected	Democratic	Tim Briggs		
150	Democratic	Joe Webster	Reelected	Democratic	Joe Webster		
150	Democratic	Joe Webster	Reelected	Republican	Frank Pastella		
151	Democratic	Melissa Cerrato	Reelected	Democratic	Melissa Cerrato		
151	Democratic	Melissa Cerrato	Reelected	Republican	Allen Arthur Anderson		
152	Democratic	Nancy Guenst	Reelected	Democratic	Nancy Guenst		
152	Democratic	Nancy Guenst	Reelected	Republican	Eric Maier		
153	Democratic	Ben Sanchez	Reelected	Democratic	Ben Sanchez		
153	Democratic	Ben Sanchez	Reelected	Republican	Cory L. Toner		
154	Democratic	Napoleon Nelson	Reelected	Democratic	Napoleon Nelson		
154	Democratic	Napoleon Nelson	Reelected	Progress for Pennsylvania	Stephanie Lynn Berardi		
155	Democratic	Danielle Friel Otten	Reelected	Democratic	Danielle Friel Otten		
155	Democratic	Danielle Friel Otten	Reelected	Republican	Greer Heindel		
156	Democratic	Chris Pielli	Reelected	Democratic	Chris Pielli		
156	Democratic	Chris Pielli	Reelected	Republican	Kris R. Vollrath		
157	Democratic	Melissa Shusterman	Reelected	Democratic	Melissa Shusterman		
157	Democratic	Melissa Shusterman	Reelected	Republican	Justin J. Pak		
158	Democratic	Christina Sappey	Reelected	Democratic	Christina Sappey		
158	Democratic	Christina Sappey	Reelected	Republican	Tina Louise Ayala		
159	Democratic	Carol Kazeem	Reelected	Democratic	Carol Kazeem		
159	Democratic	Carol Kazeem	Reelected	Republican	Mike Bannon		
160	Republican	Craig Williams	Defeated	Republican	Craig Williams		
160	Republican	Craig Williams	Defeated	Democratic	Elizabeth Moro		
161	Democratic	Leanne Krueger	Reelected	Democratic	Leanne Krueger		
161	Democratic	Leanne Krueger	Reelected	Republican	John Mancinelli Jr.		
162	Democratic	David Delloso	Reelected	Democratic	David Delloso		
162	Democratic	David Delloso	Reelected	Republican	Michael E. Murphy		
163	Democratic	Heather Boyd	Reelected	Democratic	Heather Boyd		
164	Democratic	Gina Curry	Reelected	Democratic	Gina Curry		
165	Democratic	Jennifer O'Mara	Reelected	Democratic	Jennifer O'Mara		
165	Democratic	Jennifer O'Mara	Reelected	Republican	Deidre D. McCleary		
166	Democratic	Greg Vitali	Lost primary election	Democratic	Judy Trombetta		
166	Democratic	Greg Vitali	Lost primary election	Republican	Joseph William Walker		
167	Democratic	Kristine Howard	Reelected	Democratic	Kristine Howard		
167	Democratic	Kristine Howard	Reelected	Republican	Joseph M. Lewis		
168	Democratic	Lisa Borowski	Reelected	Democratic	Lisa Borowski		
168	Democratic	Lisa Borowski	Reelected	Republican	Kathryn M.L. Buckley		
169	Republican	Kate Klunk	Reelected	Republican	Kate Klunk		
169	Republican	Kate Klunk	Reelected	Democratic	Austin L. Graham		
170	Republican	Martina White	Reelected	Republican	Martina White		
170	Republican	Martina White	Reelected	Democratic	Robert N. Gurtcheff II		
171	Republican	Kerry Benninghoff	Reelected	Republican	Kerry Benninghoff		
171	Republican	Kerry Benninghoff	Reelected	Democratic	John R. Zangari		
172	Democratic	Sean Dougherty	Reelected	Democratic	Sean Dougherty		
172	Democratic	Sean Dougherty	Reelected	Republican	Wallace J. Quinlan		
173	Democratic	Pat Gallagher	Reelected	Democratic	Pat Gallagher		
173	Democratic	Pat Gallagher	Reelected	Republican	William J. Griffin Jr.		
174	Democratic	Ed Neilson	Reelected	Democratic	Ed Neilson		
175	Democratic	Mary Isaacson	Reelected	Democratic	Mary Isaacson		
176	Republican	Jack Rader	Reelected	Republican	Jack Rader		
176	Republican	Jack Rader	Reelected	Democratic	Thomas Kucer		
177	Democratic	Joseph C. Hohenstein	Reelected	Democratic	Joseph C. Hohenstein		
177	Democratic	Joseph C. Hohenstein	Reelected	Republican	Robyn L. Bird		
178	Republican	Kristin Marcell	Reelected	Republican	Kristin Marcell		
178	Republican	Kristin Marcell	Reelected	Democratic	Monica Weninger		
179	Democratic	Jason Dawkins	Reelected	Democratic	Jason Dawkins		
180	Democratic	Jose Giral	Reelected	Democratic	Jose Giral		
181	Democratic	Malcolm Kenyatta	Reelected	Democratic	Malcolm Kenyatta		
182	Democratic	Ben Waxman	Reelected	Democratic	Ben Waxman		
183	Republican	Zach Mako	Reelected	Republican	Zach Mako		
183	Republican	Zach Mako	Reelected	Democratic	Deirdre J. Kamber Todd		
184	Democratic	Elizabeth Fiedler	Reelected	Democratic	Elizabeth Fiedler		
185	Democratic	Regina Young	Reelected	Democratic	Regina Young		
186	Democratic	Jordan A. Harris	Reelected	Democratic	Jordan A. Harris		
187	Republican	Gary Day	Defeated	Republican	Gary Day		
187	Republican	Gary Day	Defeated	Democratic	Rachel Cuevas		
188	Democratic	Rick Krajewski	Reelected	Democratic	Rick Krajewski		
189	Democratic	Tarah Probst	Reelected	Democratic	Tarah Probst		
189	Democratic	Tarah Probst	Reelected	Republican	Danica L. Hartenfels		
190	Democratic	G. Roni Green	Reelected	Democratic	G. Roni Green		
191	Democratic	Joanna E. McClinton	Reelected	Democratic	Joanna E. McClinton		
192	Democratic	Morgan Cephas	Reelected	Democratic	Morgan Cephas		
192	Democratic	Morgan Cephas	Reelected	Republican	Tiffany Brown		
193	Republican	Catherine Wallen	Reelected	Republican	Catherine Wallen		
193	Republican	Catherine Wallen	Reelected	Democratic	Todd Crawley		
194	Democratic	Tarik Khan	Reelected	Democratic	Tarik Khan		
195	Democratic	Keith Harris	Lost primary election	Democratic	Sierra McNeil		
196	Republican	George Margetas	Reelected	Republican	George Margetas		
196	Republican	George Margetas	Reelected	Democratic	Ronald Ruman		
197	Democratic	Danilo Burgos	Reelected	Democratic	Danilo Burgos		
198	Democratic	Darisha Parker	Reelected	Democratic	Darisha Parker		
199	Republican	Barbara Gleim	Reelected	Republican	Barbara Gleim		
199	Republican	Barbara Gleim	Reelected	Democratic	Tawanda Hunter Stallworth		
200	Democratic	Chris Rabb	Retired (running for U.S. Congress)	Democratic	Chris Johnson		
201	Democratic	Andre Carroll	Reelected	Democratic	Andre Carroll		
202	Democratic	Jared Solomon	Reelected	Democratic	Jared Solomon		
203	Democratic	Anthony A. Bellmon	Reelected	Democratic	Anthony A. Bellmon		

== Sources ==
- "Archival document: 2026 Primary Legislative Write in Votes (Statistically Significant)". Montgomery County, Pennsylvania.
- "Cumulative Results Report Luzerne County, Pennsylvania Primary Election". Luzerne County, Pennsylvania. May 27, 2026.
- "Cumulative Results with Aliases" (PDF). Delaware County, Pennsylvania. May 27, 2026.
- "Election Summary Report Montgomery County Summary for: All Contests, All Districts, All Tabulators, All Counting Groups Official Results" (PDF). Montgomery County, Pennsylvania. June 8, 2026.
- "Summary Results Report General Primary Election May 19, 2026 Unofficial Results Adams County, Pennsylvania" (PDF). Adams County, Pennsylvania. May 22, 2026.
- "Summary Results Report 2026 General Primary May 19, 2026 Statistics Berks County" (PDF). Berks County, PA. June 5, 2026.
- "Summary Results Report 2026 General Primary May 19, 2026 Official Results Washington" (PDF). Washington County, Pennsylvania. June 1, 2026.
- "Write-in Votes from May 19, 2026 Primary Election" (PDF). Commonwealth of Pennsylvania.
