= Tim Hayes (politician) =

American politician

Member-elect of the Pennsylvania House of Representatives from the 143rd district
- Assuming office January 4, 2027
- Succeeding: Shelby Labs

Personal details
- Party: Democratic

Timothy J. Hayes is an American politician who is the representative-elect for the 143rd district in the Pennsylvania House of Representatives. A Democrat, he defeated incumbent Shelby Labs in the 2026 election.

== Political career ==
In 2019, Hayes was elected to the borough council of Dublin, Pennsylvania. He became council president following the 2023 election. In 2026, Hayes, a member of the Democratic Party, against incumbent Republican state Representative Shelby Labs to represent the 143rd district in the Pennsylvania House of Representatives. In a blue wave election, Hayes defeated Labs and independent candidate Chris Gambino. The margin of victory between Hayes and Labs was less than 200 votes.
