= Hadley Haas =

American politician

Member-elect of the Pennsylvania House of Representatives from the 44th district
- Assuming office January 2027
- Succeeding: Valerie Gaydos

Personal details
- Party: Democratic

Hadley Haas is an American politician. A member of the Democratic Party, she is the member-elect for the 44th district of the Pennsylvania House of Representatives.
