= Bryan Allen (politician) =

American politician

Member-elect of the Pennsylvania House of Representatives from the 18th district
- Assuming office January 2027
- Succeeding: K.C. Tomlinson

Personal details
- Party: Democratic

Bryan Allen is an American politician. A member of the Democratic Party, he is the member-elect for the 18th district of the Pennsylvania House of Representatives.
