= Scott Timko =

American politician

Member-elect of the Pennsylvania House of Representatives from the 12th district
- Assuming office January 2027
- Succeeding: Brandon Dukes

Personal details
- Party: Republican

Scott Timko is an American politician. A member of the Republican Party, he is the member-elect for the 12th district of the Pennsylvania House of Representatives.
