= Kristin Egan =

American politician

Member-elect of the Pennsylvania House of Representatives from the 142nd district
- Assuming office January 2027
- Succeeding: Joe Hogan

Personal details
- Party: Democratic
- Education: Bucks County Community College; Holy Family University

Kristin Egan is an American politician. A member of the Democratic Party, she is the member-elect for the 142nd district of the Pennsylvania House of Representatives.

Egan earned an associate degree from Bucks County Community College and a bachelor's and a graduate degree from Holy Family University.
