= John Lawrence (Pennsylvania politician) =

American politician and businessman

Speaker pro tempore of the Pennsylvania House of Representatives
- In office January 5, 2021 – November 30, 2022
- Preceded by: Sheryl M. Delozier
- Succeeded by: Vacant

Member of the Pennsylvania House of Representatives from the 13th district
- Incumbent
- Assumed office January 4, 2011
- Preceded by: Tom Houghton
- Succeeded by: Madelyn Alvarino (elect)

Personal details
- Born: John Adda Lawrence; June 15, 1978 (age 48)
- Party: Republican
- Spouse: Rebecca
- Children: 2
- Education: Pennsylvania State University (BA)

John Adda Lawrence is an American politician and businessman, and member of the Republican Party. In 2010, he was elected to represent the 13th District in the Pennsylvania House of Representatives. He serves on the Agriculture & Rural Affairs, Appropriations, Committee On Committees, Government Oversight, Professional Licensure, Rules, and Transportation Committees.

== Early life ==
Lawrence earned a bachelor's degree in business from Penn State University. He worked as an account officer for J.P. Morgan Chase.

== Political career ==
Lawrence was elected to the Pennsylvania House of Representatives in 2010. He authored Act 102 of 2018, which eliminated the possibility of domestic violence victims being required to financially support their convicted abuser. He's served on six committees in the House, including the House Professional Licensure Committee and the Appropriations Committee. In February 2019, Lawrence was named deputy whip.

In the 2026 Pennsylvania House of Representatives election, he lost re-election to Democrat Madelyn Alvarino.

== Committee assignments ==
- Agriculture & Rural Affairs, Vice Chair
- Appropriations, Secretary, Subcommittee on Government and Financial Oversight - Chair
- Committee On Committees
- Government Oversight
- Professional Licensure
- Rules
- Transportation, Secretary

== Personal life ==
Lawrence and his wife, Rebecca, have two daughters and live in West Grove, Pennsylvania.

Pennsylvania House of Representatives
Preceded by Sheryl M. Delozier	Speaker pro tempore of the Pennsylvania House of Representatives; 2021–2022	Vacant
