= Andrea Verobish =

American politician

Member of the Pennsylvania House of Representatives
- Incumbent
- Assumed office April 13, 2026
- Preceded by: Louis Schmitt Jr.
- Constituency: 79th district

Personal details
- Party: Republican Party
- Website: voteverobish.com

Andrea Verobish is an American politician and member of the Pennsylvania House of Representatives. A member of the Pennsylvania Republican Party, she was elected in a special election in March 2026. Verobish served as a Field Representative and Economic Development Specialist for Congressman Glenn Thompson.
