= Wendy Ullman =

American politician (born 1952)

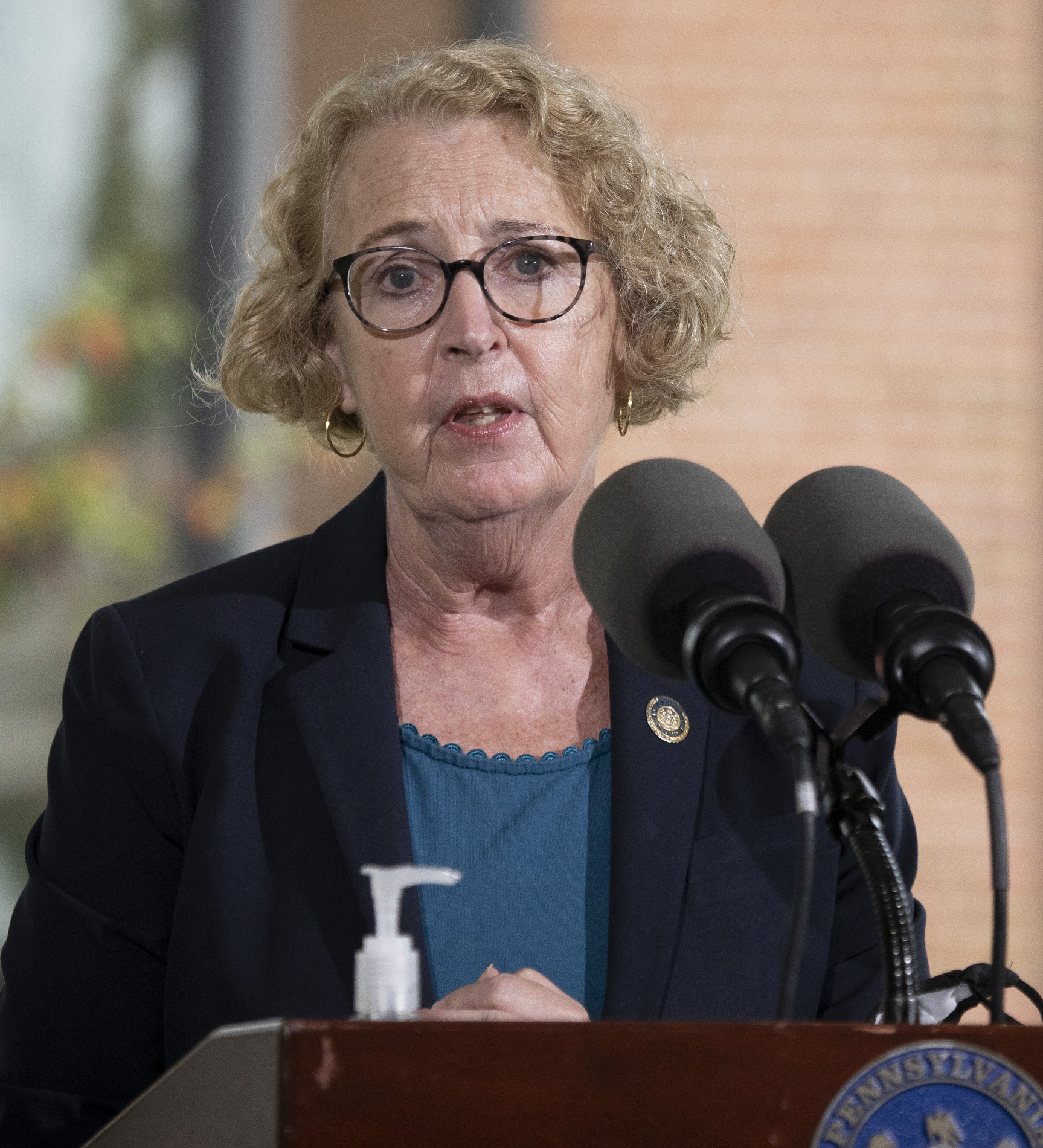

Member of the Pennsylvania House of Representatives from the 143rd district
- In office January 5, 2018 – January 5, 2021
- Preceded by: Marguerite Quinn
- Succeeded by: Shelby Labs

Personal details
- Party: Democratic
- Occupation: Professor

Wendy Ullman is an American politician. A member of the Democratic Party, she represented the 143rd district in the Pennsylvania House of Representatives from 2019 to 2021.

== Formative years ==
Born on July 29, 1952, in Oneida, New York, Ullman graduated from Watertown High School in 1970, and was awarded a Bachelor of Arts degree in English by the State University of New York at Potsdam in 1974. She was then awarded a Master of Arts degree in English by the University of Maine in 1976.

== Academic career ==
Before assuming office, Ullman worked as an English professor at Bucks County Community College. She began work there in 1988, and also worked as an educator at Delaware Valley College from 1995 to 1997. In addition, she has been a member of the English department faculty at Montgomery County Community College since 1993.

== Legislative career ==
On November 6, 2018, Ullman became one of a record number of female lawmakers elected to Pennsylvania's General Assembly. They were sworn in on January 1, 2019. At that time, women still made up only twenty-five percent of the state legislature; conversely, women made up fifty-one percent of the population in the Commonwealth of Pennsylvania.

Elected to represent the 143rd district in the Pennsylvania House of Representatives, she served in that capacity from 2019 to 2021. In 2019, Ullman introduced HB 1322 to implement a five-cent beverage deposit fee, which would be returned to the consumer upon the return of the bottle. The legislation was designed to increase the rates of recycling in Pennsylvania with unclaimed bottle deposit reimbursements forfeited to the state and used to support the commonwealth's Hazardous Sites Clean-Up fund. That same year, she was appointed to the Pennsylvania Statewide Suicide Prevention Task Force and to the Pennsylvania Higher Education Funding Commission. She held both posts until 2020. In 2020, she ran for re-election to the Pennsylvania House as an uncontested candidate during the Pennsylvania primaries. She then ran against, but was defeated by, Republican Shelby Labs during the general election on November 3 by a margin of 51.5 percent to 48.5%.

=== Written works ===
- Ullman, Wendy. "We must fight against the normalization of mass murder" (op-ed), in The Morning Call, August 9, 2019.
