= Keith Harris (politician) =

Pennsylvania politician

Member of the Pennsylvania House of Representatives from the 195th district
- Incumbent
- Assumed office September 30, 2024
- Preceded by: Donna Bullock

Personal details
- Born: c. 1961
- Party: Democratic
- Education: Philadelphia Community College

Keith Sea Harris (born c. 1961) is an American politician currently serving as a Democratic member of the Pennsylvania House of Representatives representing the 195th district since 2024.

Harris earned his teaching certificate from Philadelphia Community College in 1982. He worked with the Philadelphia Anti-Graffiti Network starting in 1984. Harris was also the 28th Ward leader for Philadelphia Democratic Party and the sergeant of arms for the Philadelphia City Council. Harris was chosen by the Philadelphia Democratic Party in 2024 to fill the seat vacated by the resignation of Donna Bullock. He won the September 17 special election unopposed. He was defeated for reelection in 2026, falling to Sierra McNeil in the Democratic primary election. Harris's defeat in the primary came after his later rescinded support for Republican-led bills on immigration and other issues.

== Electoral history ==
2024 Pennsylvania House of Representatives special election, District 195
Party	Candidate	Votes	%
Democratic	Keith Harris	Unopposed	
Total votes		3,162	100.00

2024 Pennsylvania House of Representatives election, District 195
Party	Candidate	Votes	%
Democratic	Keith Harris (incumbent)	26,653	99.28
Write-in		194	0.72
Total votes		26,847	100.00
