= Marguerite Quinn =

American politician

Marguerite Corr Quinn
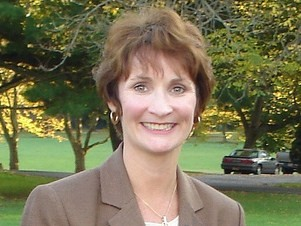

Member of the Pennsylvania House of Representatives from the 143rd district
- In office January 2, 2007 – January 1, 2019
- Preceded by: Charles T. McIlhinney Jr.
- Succeeded by: Wendy Ullman

Personal details
- Born: Marguerite Corr Philadelphia, Pennsylvania, U.S.
- Party: Republican
- Spouse: John Quinn
- Children: 2
- Education: St. Joseph's University
- Website: http://quinn4senate.com

Marguerite Corr Quinn is a former member of the Pennsylvania House of Representatives, representing the 143rd legislative district. She was first elected in 2006.

With roots in Philadelphia, Marguerite Corr moved to Doylestown with her family when she was eight years old. She attended Archbishop Wood Catholic High School, graduating in 1981 as valedictorian, and earned a degree in International Relations from St. Joseph’s University.

Quinn was first elected to the Pennsylvania House of Representatives in 2006. She represented the 143rd legislative district.
