= Gene DiGirolamo =

American politician

Gene D. DiGirolamo

Member of the Bucks County Board of Commissioners
- Incumbent
- Assumed office January 6, 2020
- Preceded by: Charles H. Martin

Member of the Pennsylvania House of Representatives from the 18th district
- In office January 3, 1995 – January 5, 2020
- Preceded by: Tommy Tomlinson
- Succeeded by: K.C. Tomlinson

Personal details
- Born: March 28, 1950 (age 76) Bensalem, Pennsylvania
- Party: Republican
- Spouse: Donna DiGirolamo
- Children: 4
- Education: Delaware Valley College; Holy Family College

Gene D. DiGirolamo (born March 28, 1950) served as a Republican member of the Pennsylvania House of Representatives for the 18th District from 1995 to 2020. He serves as the Bucks County Commissioner after being sworn in on January 6, 2020. A special election to fill the remainder of the term was held on March 17 and won by Republican K.C. Tomlinson, whose father, State Senator Tommy Tomlinson, previously held this house seat from 1991 to 1994.

== Career ==
Prior to elective office, DiGirolamo owned and managed his family's farm, DiGirolamo Farms, with his uncle Joe, who is now mayor of Bensalem Township, Pennsylvania.

In 1990, he was elected as Bensalem Township's auditor and in 1993, he served as chairman of the Bensalem Board of Auditors.

DiGirolamo was elected to the House in 1994 to replace Rep. Tommy Tomlinson who ran successfully for the Pennsylvania State Senate. He has been re-elected thirteen times.

Representative DiGirolamo served as the Republican Chairman of the House Labor Relations Committee. He was also on the House Health and Human Services Committee and was appointed to the Pennsylvania Interscholastic Athletic Association's Oversight Committee.

In 2002, his campaign website was praised as being among the best of the election cycle.

In November 2019, DiGirolamo won a seat on the Bucks County Board of Commissioners, thus tending his departure from the Pennsylvania House of Representatives. In January 2020 he was sworn in as Bucks County Commissioner.

== Personal ==
DiGirolamo is a graduate of Bishop Egan High School and attended Delaware Valley College and Holy Family College. Representative DiGirolamo and his wife Donna have four children, two sons and two daughters.

Pennsylvania House of Representatives
Preceded by Tommy Tomlinson	Member of the Pennsylvania House of Representatives from the 18th district 1995–2020	Succeeded by K.C. Tomlinson
Political offices
Preceded by Charles H. Martin	Member of the Bucks County Board of Commissioners; 2020–present	Incumbent
