= Edward F. Burns =

American politician (1931–2019)

Edward F. Burns, Jr.

Member of the Pennsylvania House of Representatives from the 18th district
- In office January 2, 1973 – November 30, 1990
- Preceded by: Andrew Fenrich
- Succeeded by: Tommy Tomlinson

Personal details
- Born: January 28, 1931 Branchdale, Pennsylvania, U.S.
- Died: January 10, 2019 (aged 87) Audubon, Pennsylvania, U.S.
- Party: Republican

Edward F. Burns Jr. (January 28, 1931 – January 10, 2019) was a Republican member of the Pennsylvania House of Representatives.
