= Pennsylvania House of Representatives, District 13 =

American legislative district

Pennsylvania's 13th State House of Representatives district
Representative
John Lawrence; R–Franklin Township, Chester County
- Population (2022): 64,075

The 13th Pennsylvania House of Representatives District is located in southeast Pennsylvania and has been represented by John Lawrence since 2010.

== District profile ==
The 13th Pennsylvania House of Representatives District is located in Chester County and includes the following areas:

- East Nottingham Township
- Elk Township
- Franklin Township
- Highland Township
- London Britain Township
- London Grove Township
- Londonderry Township
- Lower Oxford Township
- New London Township
- Oxford
- Penn Township
- Upper Oxford Township
- West Fallowfield Township
- West Grove
- West Nottingham Township

== Representatives ==
Representative	Party	Years	District home	Note
Prior to 1969, seats were apportioned by county.
Robert O. Davis	Republican	1969 – 1972		Subsequently, represented the 15th district
District moved from Beaver County to Chester & Lancaster Counties after 1972
Earl H. Smith	Republican	1973 – 1982		
Arthur D. Hershey	Republican	1983 – 2008	Cochranville	Retired
Tom Houghton	Democrat	2009 – 2011	Cochranville	Unsuccessful candidate for re-election
John Lawrence	Republican	2011 – present		Incumbent

== Recent election results ==
PA House election, 2026: Pennsylvania House, District 13
Party	Candidate	Votes	%
Democratic	Madelyn Alvarino	13,907	51.28
Republican	John Lawrence (incumbent)	13,187	48.62
Total votes		35,461	100.00
Democratic gain from Republican			

PA House election, 2024: Pennsylvania House, District 13
Party	Candidate	Votes	%
Republican	John Lawrence (incumbent)	20,571	58.01
Democratic	Cristian Luna	14,890	41.99
Total votes		35,461	100.00
Republican hold			

PA House election, 2022: Pennsylvania House, District 13
Party	Candidate	Votes	%
Republican	John Lawrence (incumbent)	16,325	59.35
Democratic	David Cunningham	11,181	40.65
Total votes		27,506	100.00
Republican hold			

PA House election, 2020: Pennsylvania House, District 13
Party	Candidate	Votes	%
Republican	John Lawrence (incumbent)	20,247	58.95
Democratic	Richard Ruggieri	14,097	41.05
Total votes		34,344	100.00
Republican hold			

PA House election, 2018: Pennsylvania House, District 13
Party	Candidate	Votes	%
Republican	John Lawrence (incumbent)	13,796	54.40
Democratic	Susannah Walker	11,250	44.36
Libertarian	Dominic Pirocchi	313	1.23
Total votes		25,359	100.00
Republican hold			

PA House election, 2016: Pennsylvania House, District 13
Party	Candidate	Votes	%
Republican	John Lawrence (incumbent)	18,446	62.49
Democratic	Nancy Dean	11,074	37.51
Total votes		29,520	100.00
Republican hold			

PA House election, 2014: Pennsylvania House, District 13
Party	Candidate	Votes	%
Republican	John Lawrence (incumbent)	10,280	62.91
Democratic	Ann Schott	6,061	37.09
Total votes		16,341	100.00
Republican hold			

PA House election, 2012: Pennsylvania House, District 13
Party	Candidate	Votes	%
Republican	John Lawrence (incumbent)	17,855	53.26
Democratic	Eric Schott	15,672	46.74
Total votes		33,527	100.00
Republican hold			

PA House election, 2010: Pennsylvania House, District 13
Party	Candidate	Votes	%
Republican	John Lawrence	12,790	54.97
Democratic	Tom Houghton (incumbent)	10,476	45.03
Total votes		23,266	100.00
Republican gain from Democratic			
