= Stephenie Scialabba =

American politician

Stephenie G. Anderson Scialabba
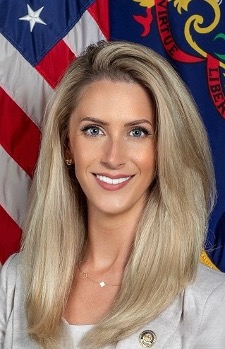
- Official portrait

Member of the Pennsylvania House of Representatives from the 12th district
- In office January 3, 2023 – March 31, 2026
- Preceded by: Daryl Metcalfe
- Succeeded by: Brandon Dukes

Personal details
- Born: c. 1991 Ebensburg, Pennsylvania, U.S.
- Party: Republican
- Spouse: John C. Scialabba (div. 2025)
- Children: 1
- Education: Bishop McCort High School; University of Pittsburgh (B.A.); University of Pittsburgh School of Law (J.D.)

Stephenie G.A. Scialabba (born c. 1991) is an American attorney and politician. A Republican, she represented the 12th District in the Pennsylvania House of Representatives from 2023 to 2026.

== Early life, education and career ==
Stephenie G. Anderson Scialabba was born and raised in Western Pennsylvania. In 2009, she graduated from Bishop McCort High School. Scialabba earned a dual major Bachelor of Arts degree in political science and history from the University of Pittsburgh in 2012, and a Juris Doctor degree from the University's School of Law in 2016. She served as the Senior Managing Editor of the University of Pittsburgh Law Review and graduated with high honors. She worked as an associate attorney at Buchanan Ingersoll & Rooney and a judicial law clerk for the Superior Court of Pennsylvania, before making partner at the law firm of Eckert Seamans specializing in healthcare, data privacy and cybersecurity.

== Political career ==
In 2022, after the unexpected death of her mother on December 23, 2021, Toni-Renee Anderson, Esq., Scialabba ran to represent the Pennsylvania House of Representatives 12th District with the support of retiring incumbent Daryl Metcalfe, defeating two opponents in the Republican primary and Democrat Robert Vigue in the general election.

She served as the Chair of the Artificial Intelligence Opportunity Task Force for the Pennsylvania House of Representatives, Chair of the Subcommittee on Government Information & Technology for the House of Representatives' State Government Committee, an Executive Member of the Pennsylvania Commission on Crime & Delinquency, Secretary of the House Veterans Affairs & Emergency Preparedness Committee and as a voting member of the House Education, Housing and Community Development, and Judiciary committees. Scialabba was appointed to serve as Deputy Whip within the Republican caucus. A focus of her political career was HB78, which successfully passed the House of Representatives in consecutive sessions and would establish data privacy rights for Pennsylvanians. She also hosted an annual event each of her terms to assist Pennsylvania families through her "Family First Initiative," which connected constituents to key resources on addiction, recovery, health, mental health, senior care, child care and disability care.

In 2023, Scialabba led a successful effort to end Butler County's status as a "sanctuary county." In 2024, through a combination of legal and legislative means, she effectively instituted a requirement that the Commonwealth require conspicuous identification and credentials of healthcare professionals who engage in school or app-based counseling for Pennsylvania students.

Scialabba announced her retirement from the state House in 2026 after rejoining the law firm of Eckert Seamans. She later announced that she would resign from the chamber on March 31, 2026.

== Personal life ==
Scialabba was married to John C. Scialabba and has one child.

== Electoral history ==
2022 Pennsylvania House of Representatives Republican primary election, District 12
Party	Candidate	Votes	%
Republican	Stephenie Scialabba	4,805	47.45
Republican	Gregg A. Semel	3,445	34.02
Republican	Scott Timko	1,856	18.33
Write-in		21	0.21
Total votes		10,127	100.00

2022 Pennsylvania House of Representatives election, District 12
Party	Candidate	Votes	%
Republican	Stephenie Scialabba	20,996	62.17
Democratic	Robert Vigue	12,734	37.70
Write-in		44	0.13
Total votes		33,774	100.00

2024 Pennsylvania House of Representatives election, District 12
Party	Candidate	Votes	%
Republican	Stephenie Scialabba (incumbent)	27,840	64.72
Democratic	Robert Vigue	15,103	35.11
Write-in		71	0.17
Total votes		43,014	100.00
