= Daryl Metcalfe =

American politician

Member of the Pennsylvania House of Representatives from the 12th district
- In office January 5, 1999 – January 3, 2023
- Preceded by: Patricia Carone
- Succeeded by: Stephenie Scialabba

Personal details
- Born: November 9, 1962 (age 63) Syracuse, New York, U.S.
- Party: Republican
- Spouse: Elke Metcalfe
- Education: Kansas State University, Manhattan

Daryl D. Metcalfe (born November 9, 1962) is an American politician who served in the Pennsylvania House of Representatives. Metcalfe is a member of the Republican Party and represented the 12th legislative district from 1999 until 2023.

== Background ==
Metcalfe is a graduate of Charles W. Baker High School in Baldwinsville, New York, and he attended Kansas State University while serving in the United States Army at Fort Riley in Kansas. He later was stationed in Germany.

Metcalfe was employed with Dade Behring (formerly DuPont Diagnostics) for 13 years as a field engineer.

== Political career ==
Metcalfe was elected in 1998 to replace retiring representative Pat Carone. He has won re-election nine times.

Since 2011 he was the majority chairman of the House State Government Committee.

Metcalfe ran as a candidate for lieutenant governor in 2010. He came in third place in the Republican primary, losing to Jim Cawley.

In 2022 Metcalfe did not seek reelection in November of that year, to retire at the end of the term.

=== Committee assignments ===
- Environmental Resources & Energy, Chair

== Political positions ==
=== Immigration ===
Metcalfe is the founder of State Legislators for Legal Immigration (SLLI), an organization opposed to birthright citizenship. The State Lawmakers for Legal Immigration works closely with the Federation for American Immigration Reform (FAIR), an anti-illegal alien organization.

On March 1, 2011, Metcalfe reintroduced HB 738, a bill which would direct police officers "to attempt to verify the immigration status of suspected illegal aliens." It would also create a new third-degree misdemeanor "for illegal aliens who violate federal law by either willfully failing to register as an alien or failing to possess proper proof of such registration when stopped for another primary offense, such as a traffic violation," crack down on employers who hire illegal aliens without first checking to see if they had registration papers and are in the state legally, create a new third-class felony "for intentionally smuggling illegal aliens (into the state) for profit," and would allow police officers "impound any vehicle driven by an illegal alien or used to transport illegal aliens." The proposed law is based on Arizona's Support Our Law Enforcement and Safe Neighborhoods Act (SB 1070), which was passed in April 2010 and largely struck down as unconstitutional.

=== Environment ===
In October 2009, Metcalfe criticized Operation FREE, a coalition of veterans and national security organizations that advocates on environmental issues, by saying: "As a veteran, I believe that any veteran lending their name, to promote the leftist propaganda of global warming and climate change, in an effort to control more of the wealth created in our economy, through cap and tax type policies, all in the name of national security, is a traitor to the oath he or she took to defend the Constitution of our great nation!"

On February 19, 2019, at House Environmental Resources and Energy Committee informational meeting on Department of Environmental Protection, Daryl Metcalfe suggested that efforts to reduce CO_{2} emissions could deprive vegetables of the CO_{2} they need to grow.

As chair of the Environment and Energy committee, Metcalf hosted an informational hearing in March 2019 to feature Gregory Wrightstone, whose testimony was at odds with the scientific consensus on climate change.

=== 2020 presidential election ===
Metcalf participated in attempts to overturn the 2020 United States presidential election. After Joe Biden won Pennsylvania, Metcalfe unsuccessfully filed suit to decertify the result. The suit was based on debunked conspiracy theories and allegations of irregularities which had previously been dismissed by courts. Metcalf urged the legislature to override the state's result by appointing electors for Trump, an action state legislative leaders said they had no authority to do. Metcalfe additionally urged the legislature to intervene by issuing subpoenas to investigate the election process, and to impeach Governor Wolf.

== Controversies and criticism ==
=== White nationalism ===
In September 2015, Metcalfe invited ProEnglish's Robert Vandervoora—a man with white nationalist ties and former head of Chicagoland Friends of American Renaissance—to testify before Pennsylvania's state government committee. After facing criticism for his decision by the Southern Poverty Law Center, who called Vandervoora a "white supremacist", Metcalfe countered by arguing that white "nationalism" is not white "supremacy." Metcalfe's response drew praise from The Daily Stormer, a white supremacist, neo-Nazi website. A GOP staffer reported that members of his own party were upset with his comments. "I believe white supremacists and white nationalists are synonymous and Daryl should repudiate both and their recent actions because I certainly do," Philadelphia Republican Representative John Taylor said after the controversy.

=== Gift ban ===
As Chairman of the House State Government Committee, Metcalfe has also drawn criticism for failing to hold a vote on a Republican-backed bill for a gift ban for state legislators.

External videos
- Touching incident, PA House video, 1:26 - incident begins at 0:05

=== LGBT rights ===
On December 5, 2017, Metcalfe strongly took issue with colleague Matthew Bradford touching his arm while speaking to him, saying, "I'm a heterosexual. I have a wife. I love my wife. I don't like men as you might so stop touching me all the time. Keep your hands to yourself. If you want to touch somebody, you have people on your side of the aisle that might like it. I don't." Pennsylvania Governor Tom Wolf then urged house leaders to demote Metcalfe from his committee position, saying "I urge House leadership to re-examine whether it is appropriate for him (Rep Metcalfe) to continue controlling a committee that oversees civil rights legislation."

Metcalfe opposed Philadelphia's program to market the city to gay tourists. He tried to cut state funding to universities that offer domestic partner benefits. He sued a gay New Hope couple for attempting to get a marriage license. In September 2009, Metcalfe held up a Pennsylvania State Assembly resolution declaring October "Domestic Violence Awareness Month". Metcalfe claimed that the bill "had language in it that brought men into the situation", citing this as evidence of a “homosexual agenda”. This met with criticism from Rep. Babette Josephs who said, "The gentleman from Butler has made this problem even worse and more men may be abused, even killed in their homes," on the House floor in 2009.

In 2011, House Bill 1434 was introduced by Daryl Metcalfe along with 36 cosponsors on May 3, 2011. It was referred to the Committee of State Government. The bill would amend the state constitution stating to ban same-sex marriage and any substantial equivalent. On March 13, 2012, a committee vote on the bill was stopped. In 2013, Daryl Metcalfe reintroduced the bill with 27 cosponsors on May 7, 2013, which is the lowest number of cosponsors the bill had been introduced with.

In June 2013, after the Defense of Marriage Act had been ruled unconstitutional by the U.S. Supreme Court, openly gay state representative Brian Sims tried to make a speech in the Pennsylvania House supporting the decision. Metcalfe, who was one of several representatives who blocked Sims from speaking, said, "I did not believe that as a member of that body that I should allow someone to make comments such as he was preparing to make that ultimately were just open rebellion against what the word of God has said, what God has said, and just open rebellion against God's law."

In April 2018, Metcalfe caused a heavy backlash following a tirade on Twitter against Democrats in Pennsylvania's state legislature, which was called homophobic, writing "I block all substantive Democrat legislation sent to my committee and advance good Republican legislation!" and "Liberals continue their lying attacks in an attempt to stop my work in defense of taxpayers and our liberty!" Metcalfe also targeted some Democrats by name, including former Representative Leslie Acosta, and sitting Representatives Sims and Matthew Bradford, labeling Acosta as a "convict" (as she had been under investigation for money laundering), insulting Sims as a "lying homosexual" and calling Bradford "touchy-feely" following a widely publicized incident involving Bradford and Metcalfe in 2017. Sims responded by denouncing Metcalfe on Twitter as "a gaslighter who threatens people and then backs down and claims victimhood when you're called out", accusing Metcalfe of starting the conflict without justification. The head of the Pennsylvania branch of the Democratic Party responded similarly by strongly condemning Metcalfe, heavily censuring him as "a partisan hack who abuses his power at the expense of making government better for Pennsylvanians" and "a disgusting human being."

=== Marjory Stoneman Douglas High School Shooting ===
Upon seeing student protests in the aftermath of the February 14, 2018 mass shooting in which 17 students and teachers were killed, Metcalfe cited his own experience in the army to criticize the students.

== Personal ==
Metcalfe lives in Cranberry Township with his wife, Elke, and daughter, Lisa.
