= Ce-Ce Gerlach =

American politician

Member-elect of the Pennsylvania House of Representatives from the 22nd district
- Assuming office January 2027
- Succeeding: Ana Tiburcio

Personal details
- Party: Democratic

Ce-Ce Gerlach is an American politician. A member of the Democratic Party, she is the member-elect for the 22nd district of the Pennsylvania House of Representatives. She received her bachelor's degree in elementary education from Cedar Crest College.
