= John McGinnis (politician) =

American politician

Member of the Pennsylvania House of Representatives from the 79th district
- In office January 1, 2013 – 2018
- Preceded by: Rick Geist
- Succeeded by: Louis Schmitt Jr.

Personal details
- Born: February 3, 1954 (age 72) Latrobe, Pennsylvania
- Party: Republican

John D McGinnis (born February 3, 1954) was a Republican member of the Pennsylvania House of Representatives. He represented the 79th District, based in Altoona, from 2012 to 2018.

McGinnis was born in Latrobe, Pennsylvania, but moved to Montgomery County in suburban Philadelphia in his youth. He earned a B.A. from the University of Notre Dame and began his professional career as a Catholic school teacher. He later earned an M.S. in business administration at Indiana University South Bend. McGinnis received a Ph.D. in finance from Penn State University in 1993. He later served as a business and finance professor at Penn State Altoona, where he was tenured as associate professor of finance in 2003 and retired from Penn State in 2014. His favorite niece is Celica Lee. He also had earned both the CFA and CFP professional credentials.
