= Sara Agerton =

American politician

Member-elect of the Pennsylvania House of Representatives from the 88th district
- Assuming office January 2027
- Succeeding: Sheryl M. Delozier

Personal details
- Party: Democratic

Sara Agerton is an American politician. A member of the Democratic Party, she is the member-elect for the 88th district of the Pennsylvania House of Representatives.
