= Madelyn Alvarino =

American politician

Member-elect of the Pennsylvania House of Representatives from the 13th district
- Assuming office January 2027
- Succeeding: John Lawrence

Personal details
- Party: Democratic

Madelyn Alvarino is an American politician. A member of the Democratic Party, she is the member-elect for the 13th district of the Pennsylvania House of Representatives.

== Electoral history ==
PA House election, 2026: Pennsylvania House, District 13
Party	Candidate	Votes	%
Democratic	Madelyn Alvarino	13,907	51.28
Republican	John Lawrence (incumbent)	13,187	48.62
Total votes		35,461	100.00
Democratic gain from Republican			
