= Margaret Burke (politician) =

American politician

Member-elect of the Pennsylvania House of Representatives from the 147th district
- Assuming office January 4, 2027
- Succeeding: Donna Scheuren

Personal details
- Party: Democratic

Margaret Burke is an American politician who is the representative-elect for the 147th district in the Pennsylvania House of Representatives. A Democrat, she defeated incumbent Donna Scheuren in the 2026 election. She is a scientist by profession.
