= Donna Scheuren =

American politician

Member of the Pennsylvania House of Representatives from the 147th district
- Incumbent
- Assumed office January 3, 2023
- Preceded by: Tracy Pennycuick
- Succeeded by: Margaret Burke (elect)

Personal details
- Born: New Jersey, U.S.
- Party: Republican
- Spouse: David Michael Scheuren
- Education: The College of New Jersey
- Website: repscheuren.com

Donna Scheuren is a Republican member of the Pennsylvania House of Representatives, representing the 147th district.

== Early life ==
Scheuren attended the Cherokee High School in Marlton, New Jersey, graduating in 1987. She attended The College of New Jersey graduating with a Bachelor of Science in Business Administration as part of their class of 1991. Prior to her election she worked as a Manufacturer's Representative. She moved to Lower Salford Township in 1996, shortly after marrying her husband, Dave Scheuren.

== Political career ==
Scheuren first became involved in politics when she became a member of the Souderton Area School Board and serve for three terms. She was also the Township supervisor for Lower Salford Township, and served on their sewer authority. She would defeat Democrat, Alexandra Wisser, a homemaker, in the general election. Scheuren defeated Wisser with 17,667 votes to 14,626.

She was defeated at the 2026 election by Democrat Margaret Burke.

== Electoral results ==
PA House election, 2022: Pennsylvania House, District 147
Party	Candidate	Votes	%	±%
Republican	Donna Scheuren	17,667	54.2	▼0.52
Democratic	Alexandra Wisser	14,626	44.8	▲1.64
Margin of victory		3,041	9.4	▼3.12
Turnout		32,293	100	
