= Jen Mazzocco =

American politician

Member of the Pennsylvania House of Representatives
- Incumbent
- Assumed office March 23, 2026
- Preceded by: Dan Miller
- Constituency: 42nd district

Personal details
- Born: 1984 (age 42)
- Party: Democratic Party
- Education: University of Pittsburgh
- Occupation: Teacher

Jennifer Mazzocco is an American teacher, politician and member of the Pennsylvania House of Representatives. A member of the Democratic Party, she was elected in a special election in February 2026.

Mazzocco has B.A. and M.A. degrees from the University of Pittsburgh. She is a native of Hempfield in Westmoreland County but has lived in Dormont in Allegheny County for the last dozen years. She was a teacher for 15 years at the Taylor Allderdice High School in the Pittsburgh public school district. As well as teaching English, she also coached the school's debate team the school's quiz bowl teams. Mazzocco is a member of the Pittsburgh Federation of Teachers trade union and led its Political Action Committee from 2018 to 2025.

Mazzocco has served three terms on the borough council in Dormont and is the current president. The Pennsylvania House of Representatives' 42nd district, which consists of the Baldwin, Castle Shannon, Dormont, Mt. Lebanon and a part of Upper St. Clair, became vacant after incumbent Dan Miller was elected to the Allegheny County Court of Common Pleas in November 2025. On January 3, 2026, the Allegheny County Democratic Committee chose Mazzocco over Alliyson Feldmann to be the party's candidate at the special election. Mazzocco was elected to the Pennsylvania House of Representatives at the special election held on February 24, 2026, receiving 82% of votes. She will serve-out Miller's term which expires at the end of 2026. Mazzocco has indicated that she will seek re-election at the November 2026 general election.

Mazzocco is married and has two daughters.
