= Judy Trombetta =

American politician

Member-elect of the Pennsylvania House of Representatives from the 166th district
- Assuming office January 2027
- Succeeding: Greg Vitali

Personal details
- Party: Democratic

Judy Trombetta is an American politician. A member of the Democratic Party, she is the member-elect for the 166th district of the Pennsylvania House of Representatives.
