= Tommy Tomlinson =

American politician

Robert M. Tomlinson
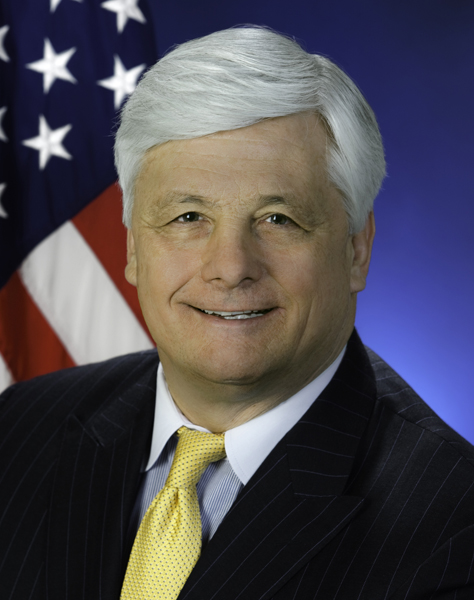

Member of the Pennsylvania State Senate from the 6th district
- In office January 3, 1995 – November 30, 2022
- Preceded by: Craig Lewis
- Succeeded by: Frank Farry

Member of the Pennsylvania House of Representatives from the 18th district
- In office January 1, 1991 – November 29, 1994
- Preceded by: Ed Burns
- Succeeded by: Gene DiGirolamo

Personal details
- Born: December 4, 1945 (age 80) Newtown, Pennsylvania
- Party: Republican
- Education: West Chester University (BS)
- Occupation: Funeral Director

Robert M. Tomlinson (born December 4, 1945) is an American politician who served as a member of the Pennsylvania State Senate, representing the 6th District from 1995 to 2022.

== Biography ==
Tomlinson was previously a member of the Pennsylvania House of Representatives for the 18th District from 1991 to 1994. He was a director of the Bensalem Township School District from 1978 to 1990.

In 2010, Tomlinson saved Lower Bucks Hospital from closure by legalizing table games in Bucks County casinos. The tax revenue generated allowed the hospital to avoid closure. In November 2019, Tomlinson received the Dee Brown Lifetime Achievement Award for his assistance to the hospital. Tomlinson's close relationship with casino lobbyists, including sponsorship of bills authored by them, has been a subject of controversy which was exposed in 2022.

Pennsylvania House of Representatives
Preceded by Edward F. Burns	Member of the Pennsylvania House of Representatives from the 18th district 1991–1994	Succeeded by Gene DiGirolamo
Pennsylvania State Senate
Preceded by H. Craig Lewis	Member of the Pennsylvania State Senate from the 6th district 1995–2022	Succeeded by Frank Farry
