= Melissa Brewer =

American politician

Member-elect of the Pennsylvania House of Representatives from the 130th district
- Assuming office January 2027
- Succeeding: David Maloney

Personal details
- Party: Republican

Melissa Brewer is an American politician. A member of the Republican Party, she is the member-elect for the 130th district of the Pennsylvania House of Representatives.
