= Sierra McNeil =

American politician

Member-elect of the Pennsylvania House of Representatives from the 195th district
- Assuming office January 2027
- Succeeding: Keith Harris

Personal details
- Party: Democratic

Sierra McNeil is an American politician. A member of the Democratic Party, she is the member-elect for the 195th district of the Pennsylvania House of Representatives.
