= Louis Schmitt Jr. =

American politician

Louis Schmitt

Member of the Pennsylvania House of Representatives from the 79th district
- In office January 1, 2019 – December 31, 2025
- Preceded by: John McGinnis
- Succeeded by: Andrea Verobish

Personal details
- Born: March 21, 1962 (age 64) Dutch Hill, Altoona, Pennsylvania, U.S.
- Party: Republican
- Spouse: Helen
- Children: 2
- Education: Saint Francis University (BA); Franklin Pierce Law Center (JD)
- Alma mater: Altoona Area High School

Louis C. Schmitt Jr. (born March 21, 1962) is an American attorney and politician who served as a member of the Pennsylvania House of Representatives from the 79th district from 2019 to 2026.

== Early life and education ==
Schmitt was born on March 21, 1962, in the Dutch Hill neighborhood of Altoona, Pennsylvania. He graduated from Altoona Area High School in 1980. Schmitt earned a Bachelor of Arts degree in political science and history from Saint Francis University in 1984 and a Juris Doctor from the Franklin Pierce Law Center in 1987.

== Career ==
From 1993 to 2018, Schmitt was a law partner at McIntyre, Hartye, Schmitt, and Sosnowski. He was elected to represent the 79th Pennsylvania House of Representatives District in 2018. In the primary, he faced off against Sharon Bream, a school board member for the Altoona Area School District. He defeated Bream on May 15, 2018 by a near 2–1 margin.

In 2020, Schmitt faced no Republican primary challenge. A Democrat, Jason Runk, filed petitions and appeared on the ballot, but disappeared from the public eye following Facebook controversy. Schmitt again won the Republican primary in 2022 unchallenged, and faced no Democrat challenger in 2022. In 2024, Schmitt won again with no challenger.

In January 2025, Rep. Schmitt announced his candidacy for an open Court of Common Pleas seat within Blair County. Pennsylvania statute allows Common Pleas candidates to cross-file on the Republican and Democrat ticket, and Schmitt obtained a place on the ballot on both. He faced attorney Mike Routch, attorney John Sisto, and MDJ Paula Aigner, who all cross-filed. After winning the election he resigned from the Pennsylvania House in December 2025 to assume the position.

== Personal life ==
Schmitt lives in Logan Township, Blair County, Pennsylvania, with his wife Helen; the couple have two daughters.

== Electoral record ==
2018 Republican primary election: Pennsylvania House of Representatives, District 79
Party	Candidate	Votes	%
Republican	Louis C. Schmitt, Jr.	3,865	66.7%
Republican	Sharon Bream	1,931	33.3%

2018 general election: Pennsylvania House of Representatives, District 79
Party	Candidate	Votes	%
Republican	Louis C. Schmitt, Jr.	15,106	100%

2020 Republican primary election: Pennsylvania House of Representatives, District 79
Party	Candidate	Votes	%
Republican	Louis C. Schmitt, Jr.	6,638	100%

2020 general election: Pennsylvania House of Representatives, District 79
Party	Candidate	Votes	%
Republican	Louis C. Schmitt, Jr.	20,103	70.2%
Democratic	Jason Runk	8,536	29.8%

2022 Republican primary election: Pennsylvania House of Representatives, District 79
Party	Candidate	Votes	%
Republican	Louis C. Schmitt, Jr.	7,870	100%

2022 general election: Pennsylvania House of Representatives, District 79
Party	Candidate	Votes	%
Republican	Louis C. Schmitt, Jr.	18,434	93.5%

2024 Republican primary election: Pennsylvania House of Representatives, District 79
Party	Candidate	Votes	%
Republican	Louis C. Schmitt, Jr.	6,246	100%

2024 general election: Pennsylvania House of Representatives, District 79
Party	Candidate	Votes	%
Republican	Louis C. Schmitt, Jr.	25,629	95.6%
