= K. C. Tomlinson =

American politician from Pennsylvania

Kathleen C. Tomlinson

Member of the Pennsylvania House of Representatives from the 18th district
- Incumbent
- Assumed office April 6, 2020
- Preceded by: Gene DiGirolamo

Personal details
- Born: September 29, 1988 (age 38)
- Party: Republican
- Education: Bensalem High School, Mercer County Community College
- Occupation: Funeral director

Kathleen C. Tomlinson (born September 29, 1988) is an American politician. She is a Republican in the Pennsylvania House of Representatives. In 2020, Tomlinson was elected to represent District 18, which encompasses a portion of Bucks County.

== Background ==
Tomlinson is a lifelong-resident of Bensalem. She is the daughter of Pennsylvania State Senator Tommy Tomlinson, and is a third-generation funeral director at their family-run funeral home in Bensalem.

== Political career ==
Tomlinson defeated Harold Hayes in a special election that was held March 17, 2020, to replace Gene DiGirolamo, who had resigned to become a Bucks County commissioner. She assumed office on April 6, 2020.

Tomlinson sought re-election in the general election held November 3, 2020, and again defeated Hayes to retain her seat for a two-year term. On January 29, 2021, she was named chair of the Pennsylvania House Human Services Subcommittee on Drugs and Alcohol.

=== Committee assignments ===
- Children & Youth
- Gaming Oversight, Secretary
- Human Services, Subcommittee on Drugs and Alcohol - Chair
- Urban Affairs
