= Ben Humble (politician) =

American politician

Member-elect of the Pennsylvania House of Representatives from the 50th district
- Assuming office January 2027
- Succeeding: Bud Cook

Personal details
- Party: Republican

Ben Humble is an American politician. A member of the Republican Party, he is the member-elect for the 50th district of the Pennsylvania House of Representatives.
