= Megan Griffin-Shelley =

American politician

Member-elect of the Pennsylvania House of Representatives from the 148th district
- Assuming office January 2027
- Succeeding: Mary Jo Daley

Personal details
- Party: Democratic

Megan Griffin-Shelley is an American politician. A member of the Democratic Party, she is the member-elect for the 148th district of the Pennsylvania House of Representatives.
