= Rachel Cuevas =

American politician

Member-elect of the Pennsylvania House of Representatives from the 187th district
- Assuming office January 2027
- Succeeding: Gary Day

Personal details
- Party: Democratic

Rachel Cuevas is an American politician. A member of the Democratic Party, she is the member-elect for the 187th district of the Pennsylvania House of Representatives.
