= Brittany Bloam =

American politician

Member-elect of the Pennsylvania House of Representatives from the 45th district
- Assuming office December, 2026
- Succeeding: Anita Kulik

Personal details
- Party: Democratic
- Education: Gettysburg College (BA) University of Pittsburgh, School of Law (JD)
- Profession: Attorney

Brittany Bloam is a working mom, lawyer, and American politician. A member of the Democratic Party, she is the member-elect for the 45th district of the Pennsylvania House of Representatives.
