= Pennsylvania House of Representatives, District 142 =

American legislative district

Coordinates: 40.17887°N 74.98992°W

Pennsylvania's 142nd State House of Representatives district
Representative
Joe Hogan; R–Langhorne
- Population (2022): 65,233

The 142nd Pennsylvania House of Representatives District is located in Southeastern Pennsylvania and has been represented since 2023 by Republican Joe Hogan.

== District profile ==
The 142nd Pennsylvania House of Representatives District is located in Bucks County. It includes the Joseph Richardson House. It is made up of the following areas:

- Langhorne
- Langhorne Manor
- Lower Southampton Township
- Middletown Township (PART)
  - District Upper
  - District Lower (PART)
    - Divisions 01, 02, and 13
- Northampton Township (PART)
  - Districts 09, 10, and 14
- Penndel

== Representatives ==
Representative	Party	Years	District home	Note
Prior to 1969, seats were apportioned by county.
James L. Wright, Jr.	Republican	1969 – 1990	Levittown	
Matthew N. Wright	Republican	1991 – 2006	Levittown	
Christopher J. King	Democrat	2007 – 2008	Langhorne	Unsuccessful candidate for reelection
Frank Farry	Republican	2009 – 2023	Langhorne	Elected to Pennsylvania Senate, District 6 in 2022
Joe Hogan	Republican	2023 – present	Langhorne	Incumbent. Unsuccessful candidate for reelection.
Kristin Egan	Democrat	Assuming office on January 5, 2027	Langhorne	Member-elect

== Recent election results ==
PA House election, 2024: Pennsylvania House, District 142
Party	Candidate	Votes	%
Republican	Joe Hogan (incumbent)	21,226	54.74
Democratic	Anna Payne	17,492	45.11
Total votes		38,718	100.00
Republican hold			

PA House election, 2022: Pennsylvania House, District 142
Party	Candidate	Votes	%
Republican	Joe Hogan	15,447	50.12
Democratic	Mark Moffa	15,371	49.88
Total votes		30,818	100.00
Republican hold			

PA House election, 2020: Pennsylvania House, District 142
Party	Candidate	Votes	%
Republican	Frank Farry (incumbent)	25,916	61.18
Democratic	Lauren Lareau	16,443	38.82
Total votes		42,359	100.00
Republican hold			

PA House election, 2018: Pennsylvania House, District 142
Party	Candidate	Votes	%
Republican	Frank Farry (incumbent)	18,177	56.07
Democratic	Lauren Lareau	14,241	43.93
Total votes		32,418	100.00
Republican hold			

PA House election, 2016: Pennsylvania House, District 142
Party	Candidate	Votes	%
Republican	Frank Farry (incumbent)	Unopposed	
Total votes		26,325	100.00
Republican hold			

PA House election, 2014: Pennsylvania House, District 142
Party	Candidate	Votes	%
Republican	Frank Farry (incumbent)	14,758	65.20
Democratic	Regina Kiley	7,878	34.80
Total votes		22,636	100.00
Republican hold			

PA House election, 2012: Pennsylvania House, District 142
Party	Candidate	Votes	%
Republican	Frank Farry (incumbent)	Unopposed	
Total votes		20,596	100.00
Republican hold			

PA House election, 2010: Pennsylvania House, District 142
Party	Candidate	Votes	%
Republican	Frank Farry (incumbent)	14,514	63.81
Democratic	John Toth	8,231	36.19
Total votes		22,745	100.00
Republican hold			
