= Elizabeth Moro =

American politician

Member-elect of the Pennsylvania House of Representatives from the 160th district
- Assuming office January 2027
- Succeeding: Craig Williams

Personal details
- Party: Democratic

Elizabeth Moro is an American politician. A member of the Democratic Party, she is the member-elect for the 160th district of the Pennsylvania House of Representatives.
