= Brandon Dukes =

American politician

Member of the Pennsylvania House of Representatives
- Incumbent
- Assumed office September 8, 2026
- Preceded by: Stephenie Scialabba
- Constituency: 12th district

Personal details
- Born: 1985 or 1986 (age 40–41)
- Party: Democratic Party
- Education: University of Pittsburgh

Brandon Michael Dukes is an American politician and member of the Pennsylvania House of Representatives. A member of the Democratic Party, he was elected in a special election in August 2026.

== Biography ==
Dukes grew up in the Brookline neighborhood of Pittsburgh and graduated from Seton-La Salle Catholic High School. He has a bachelor's degree in political science from the University of Pittsburgh. He currently resides in Cranberry Township, Butler County. He has worked in the financial sector since 2010, most recently in mortgages and commercial lending for a national bank.

Dukes contested the Cranberry Township supervisor election in November 2025 but was defeated by incumbent Bruce Hezlep by 1.3%. The Pennsylvania House of Representatives' 12th district, which includes the northern suburbs of Pittsburgh, became vacant following the resignation of incumbent Stephenie Scialabba in March 2026. The district has been represented by Republicans since the 1990s and voted for Donald Trump by a margin of 18% in the 2024 presidential election. Dukes was unopposed in the Democratic Party primary in May 2026. He was narrowly elected to the Pennsylvania House of Representatives in a special election held on August 18, 2026, receiving 50.3% of votes. He was sworn in on September 8, 2026 and will serve-out the remainder of Scialabba's term which expires in January 2027. Dukes and his special election opponent Scott Timko will face each other in the general election in the district on November 3, 2026.

Dukes is married and has a daughter.
