= Sheryl M. Delozier =

American politician

Sheryl Delozier
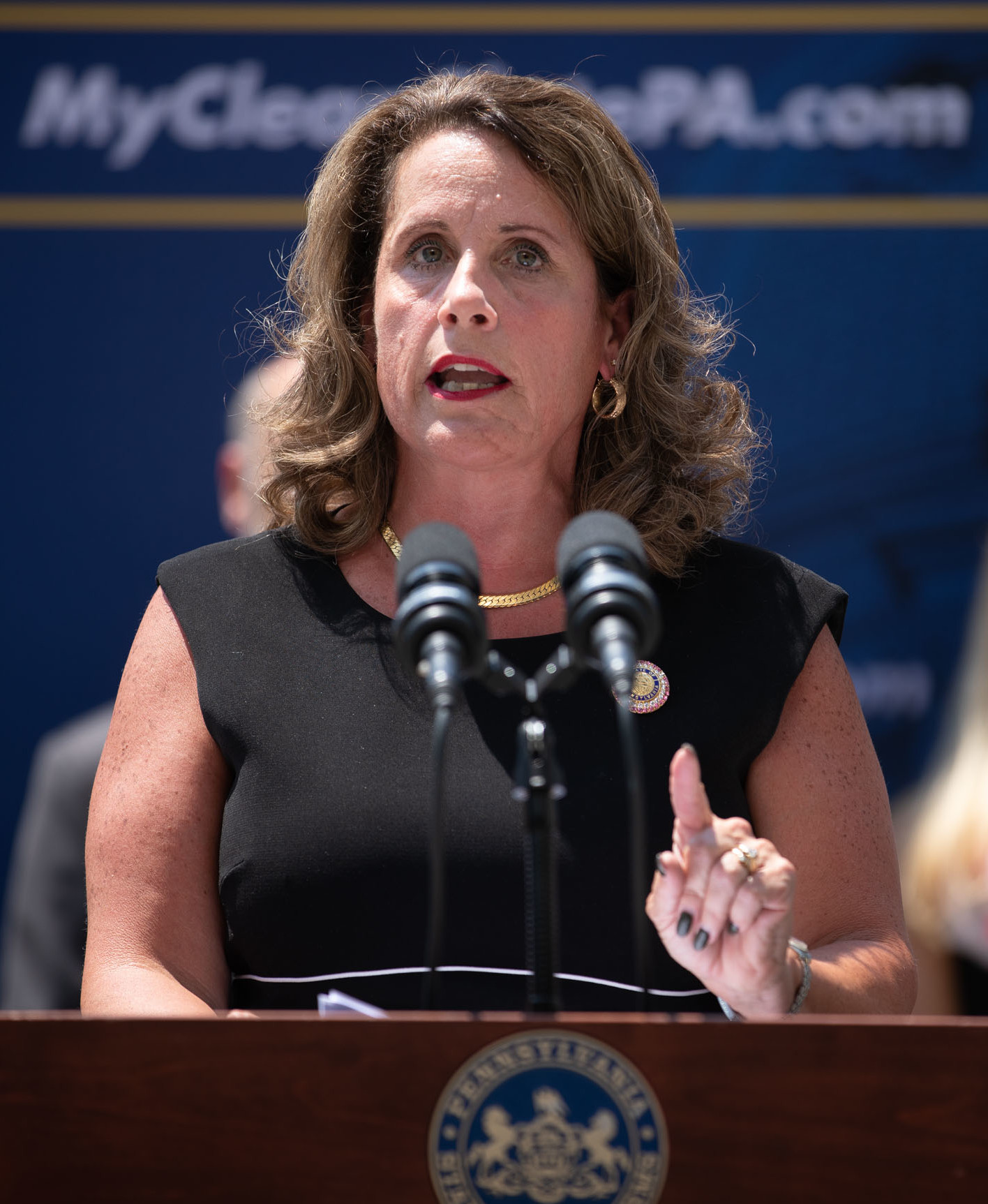

Speaker pro tempore of the Pennsylvania House of Representatives
- In office February 19, 2018 – January 5, 2021
- Preceded by: Matt E. Baker
- Succeeded by: John Lawrence

Member of the Pennsylvania House of Representatives from the 88th district
- Incumbent
- Assumed office January 6, 2009
- Preceded by: Jerry L. Nailor

Personal details
- Born: 1967 (age 58–59) Mount Vernon, New York, U.S.
- Party: Republican
- Education: University of Delaware, Newark (BA); Pennsylvania State University, University Park (MBA)

Sheryl Delozier is a Republican member of the Pennsylvania House of Representatives, first elected to represent the 88th Legislative District in November 2008.

== Career ==
Before winning an Assembly seat, Delozier worked in several facets of state government. She started in the state Auditor General's office, then moved on to a position with former Governor Tom Ridge's transition team. She continued on in the Ridge and Schweiker Administrations. Her most recent appointment was with the Pennsylvania Public Utility Commission.

Delozier currently sits on the Children & Youth, Consumer Affairs, and Rules committees.

On January 13, 2026, Delozier announced her intention to not seek re-election in 2026.

== Personal ==
Delozier graduated from West Chester East High School and the University of Delaware with a degree in political science and a concentration in domestic government. She went on to the Open University of the Netherlands, where she studied international business in European markets, and later to the Pennsylvania State University, where she received her master's degree in management in business administration.

Pennsylvania House of Representatives
Preceded by Matt E. Baker	Speaker pro tempore of the Pennsylvania House of Representatives; 2018–2021	Succeeded by John Lawrence
