= Meriam Sabih =

American politician

Member-elect of the Pennsylvania House of Representatives from the 131st district
- Assuming office January 2027
- Succeeding: Milou Mackenzie

Personal details
- Party: Democratic

Meriam Sabih is an American politician. A member of the Democratic Party, she is the member-elect for the 131st district of the Pennsylvania House of Representatives.
