= Jessica McClay =

American politician

Member-elect of the Pennsylvania House of Representatives from the 121st district
- Assuming office January 2027
- Succeeding: Eddie Day Pashinski

Personal details
- Party: Democratic

Jessica McClay is an American politician. A member of the Democratic Party, she is the member-elect for the 121st district of the Pennsylvania House of Representatives.
