= Chris Johnson (Pennsylvania politician) =

American politician

Member-elect of the Pennsylvania House of Representatives from the 200th district
- Assuming office January 2027
- Succeeding: Chris Rabb

Personal details
- Party: Democratic

Chris Johnson is an American politician. A member of the Democratic Party, he is the member-elect for the 200th district of the Pennsylvania House of Representatives.
