= Pennsylvania House of Representatives, District 44 =

American legislative district

Pennsylvania's 44th State House of Representatives district
Representative
Valerie Gaydos; R–Moon Township
- Population (2022): 66,419

The 44th Pennsylvania House of Representatives District is located in southwest Pennsylvania and has been represented since 2019 by Valerie Gaydos.

== District profile ==
The 44th District is located in Allegheny County and includes the following areas:

- Aleppo Township
- Bell Acres
- Crescent Township
- Edgeworth
- Findlay Township
- Glen Osborne
- Glenfield
- Haysville
- Leet Township
- Leetsdale
- Moon Township
- North Fayette Township
- Sewickley
- Sewickley Heights
- Sewickley Hills

== Representatives ==
Representative	Party	Years	District home	Note
Prior to 1969, seats were apportioned by county.
Andrew J. McGraw	Democrat	1969–1976		
Ronald Gamble	Democrat	1977–1996		
John R. Pippy	Republican	1997–2003		Resigned March 24, 2003 after election to Pennsylvania Senate.
Mark Mustio	Republican	2003–2019	Moon Township	Elected June 17, 2003 to fill vacancy
Valerie Gaydos	Republican	2019–present	Moon Township	Incumbent

== Recent election results ==
PA House election, 2024: Pennsylvania House, District 44
Party	Candidate	Votes	%
Republican	Valerie Gaydos (incumbent)	20,811	53.80
Democratic	Hadley Haas	17,872	46.20
Total votes		38,683	100.00
Republican hold			

PA House election, 2022: Pennsylvania House, District 44
Party	Candidate	Votes	%
Republican	Valerie Gaydos (incumbent)	16,703	54.90
Democratic	Debbie Turici	13,719	45.10
Total votes		30,422	100.00
Republican hold			

PA House election, 2020: Pennsylvania House, District 44
Party	Candidate	Votes	%
Republican	Valerie Gaydos (incumbent)	22,140	54.96
Democratic	Michele Knoll	18,143	45.04
Total votes		40,283	100.00
Republican hold			

PA House election, 2018: Pennsylvania House, District 44
Party	Candidate	Votes	%
Republican	Valerie Gaydos	15,338	51.72
Democratic	Michele Knoll	14,319	48.28
Total votes		29,657	100.00
Republican hold			

PA House election, 2016: Pennsylvania House, District 43
Party	Candidate	Votes	%
Republican	Mark Mustio (incumbent)	Unopposed	
Total votes		27,715	100.00
Republican hold			
