= Nicky Woods =

American politician

Member-elect of the Pennsylvania House of Representatives from the 98th district
- Assuming office January 2027
- Succeeding: Tom Jones

Personal details
- Party: Republican

Nicky Woods is an American politician. A member of the Republican Party, she is the member-elect for the 98th district of the Pennsylvania House of Representatives.
