= Pennsylvania House of Representatives, District 42 =

American legislative district

Pennsylvania's 42nd State House of Representatives district
Representative
Jen Mazzocco; D–Dormont
- Population (2022): 63,959

The 42nd Pennsylvania House of Representatives District is located in southwest Pennsylvania and is currently represented by Jen Mazzocco.

== District profile ==
The 42nd Pennsylvania House of Representatives District is located in Allegheny County and includes the following areas:

- Baldwin Township
- Castle Shannon
- Dormont
- Mt. Lebanon
- Upper St. Clair Township (part)
  - Ward 01
  - Ward 02
  - Ward 03 (part)
    - Division 03
  - Ward 04 (part)
    - Division 01

== Representatives ==
Representative	Party	Years	District home	Note
Prior to 1969, seats were apportioned by county.
H. Sheldon Parker, Jr.	Republican	1969 – 1978		
Terrence F. McVerry	Republican	1979 – 1990		
Gregory C. Fajt	Democrat	1991 – 1996		
Thomas L. Stevenson	Republican	1997 – 2006		
Matthew H. Smith	Democrat	2007 – 2012	Mt. Lebanon	Resigned upon election to the State Senate
Dan Miller	Democrat	2013 – 2025	Mt. Lebanon	Resigned upon election to Allegheny County Court of Common Pleas
Jen Mazzocco	Democrat	2026 – present	Dormont	Elected to fill vacancy

== Recent election results ==
PA House election, 2024: Pennsylvania House, District 42
Party	Candidate	Votes	%
Democratic	Dan Miller (incumbent)	26,932	66.72
Republican	Joseph Leckenby	13,436	33.28
Total votes		40,368	100.00
Democratic hold			

PA House election, 2022: Pennsylvania House, District 42
Party	Candidate	Votes	%
Democratic	Dan Miller (incumbent)	23,409	68.11
Republican	Patricia Tylka	10,961	31.89
Total votes		34,370	100.00
Democratic hold			

PA House election, 2020: Pennsylvania House, District 42
Party	Candidate	Votes	%
Democratic	Dan Miller (incumbent)	25,580	68.47
Republican	Kurt Korinko, Jr.	11,778	31.53
Total votes		37,358	100.00
Democratic hold			

PA House election, 2018: Pennsylvania House, District 42
Party	Candidate	Votes	%
Democratic	Dan Miller (incumbent)	Unopposed	
Total votes		23,947	100.00
Democratic hold			

PA House election, 2016: Pennsylvania House, District 42
Party	Candidate	Votes	%
Democratic	Dan Miller (incumbent)	Unopposed	
Total votes		26,759	100.00
Democratic hold			
