= Pennsylvania House of Representatives, District 79 =

American legislative district

Pennsylvania's 79th State House of Representatives district
Representative
Andrea Verobish; R–Allegheny Township, Blair County
- Population (2022): 63,269

The 79th Pennsylvania House of Representatives District is located in central Pennsylvania and has been represented by Andrea Verobish since March 2026.

== District profile ==
The 79th District is located in Blair County and includes the following areas:

- Allegheny Township
- Altoona
- Logan Township
- Tunnelhill (Blair County Portion)

== Representatives ==
Representative	Party	Years	District home	Note
Prior to 1969, seats were apportioned by county.
Denny J. Bixler	Democrat	1969 – 1974		
John P. Milliron	Democrat	1975 – 1978		
Richard Geist	Republican	1979 – 2012	Altoona	
John McGinnis	Republican	2013 – 2018		
Louis Schmitt Jr.	Republican	2019 – 2026		
Andrea Verobish	Republican	2026 –present	Allegheny Township	Elected to fill vacancy

== Recent election results ==
PA House election, 2024: Pennsylvania House, District 79
Party	Candidate	Votes	%
Republican	Louis Schmitt, Jr. (incumbent)	Unopposed	
Total votes		25,629	100.00
Republican hold			

PA House election, 2022: Pennsylvania House, District 79
Party	Candidate	Votes	%
Republican	Louis Schmitt, Jr. (incumbent)	Unopposed	
Total votes		18,434	100.00
Republican hold			

PA House election, 2020: Pennsylvania House, District 79
Party	Candidate	Votes	%
Republican	Louis Schmitt, Jr. (incumbent)	20,103	70.19
Democratic	Jason Runk	8,536	29.81
Total votes		28,639	100.00
Republican hold			

PA House election, 2018: Pennsylvania House, District 79
Party	Candidate	Votes	%
Republican	Louis Schmitt, Jr.	Unopposed	
Total votes		15,106	100.00
Republican hold			

PA House election, 2016: Pennsylvania House, District 79
Party	Candidate	Votes	%
Republican	John McGinnis (incumbent)	Unopposed	
Total votes		20,241	100.00
Republican hold			
