= Dan Miller (Pennsylvania politician) =

American politician

Majority Whip of the Pennsylvania House of Representatives
- In office February 28, 2023 – January 7, 2025
- Leader: Matthew Bradford
- Preceded by: Jordan Harris
- Succeeded by: Michael Schlossberg

Member of the Pennsylvania House of Representatives from the 42nd district
- In office June 4, 2013 – December 17, 2025
- Preceded by: Matthew H. Smith
- Succeeded by: Jen Mazzocco

Personal details
- Born: Daniel L. Miller; February 9, 1973 (age 53) Connecticut, United States
- Party: Democratic
- Spouse: Kim Miller
- Education: Western Connecticut State University; Catholic University of America

Daniel L. Miller (born February 9, 1973 in Danbury, Connecticut) is a former member of the Pennsylvania House of Representatives, representing the 42nd district as a Democrat.

== Biography ==
Miller grew up in Connecticut and intended to pursue a military career. He enlisted in the Army National Guard after high school but was honorably discharged after receiving a severe leg injury. Miller then enrolled in the AmeriCorps program and worked with disadvantaged youths. He then furthered his studies, receiving a bachelor's degree from Western Connecticut State University, and subsequently earning a job as the director of a youth camp.

Miller pursued a Juris Doctor degree from the Catholic University of America. Upon moving to Pennsylvania, he took a job with the Allegheny County public defender's office. He was elected to the Mt. Lebanon Commission, representing Ward 5, in 2007 and served a four-year term. At the time of his election to the Pennsylvania House, he served as an assistant solicitor in the Allegheny County law department. On December 4, 2024, Miller announced that he is running for judge of the Allegheny County Court of Common Pleas in 2025. Miller won a seat on the Court in the November 4, 2025, general election. He resigned from the Pennsylvania House in December 2025 in order to assume his judicial position.

== Committee assignments ==
- Government Oversight
- Rules

== Links ==
- Rep. Dan Miller website
