= Joe Hogan (Pennsylvania politician) =

American politician

Member of the Pennsylvania House of Representatives from the 142nd district
- Incumbent
- Assumed office January 3, 2023
- Preceded by: Frank Farry

Personal details
- Party: Republican
- Education: Pennsylvania State University (B.A., M.P.A.) Temple University (J.D.)

Joe Hogan is an American politician. A Republican, he is a member of the Pennsylvania House of Representatives representing the 142nd legislative district since 2023.

== Political career ==
Prior to his election to the House, Hogan served as a program director for the Redevelopment Authority of the County of Bucks (RDA), where he managed grant distribution. During his tenure, he oversaw the allocation of approximately $1 million in small business grants and loans, as well as several million dollars in emergency services grants. In 2022, Hogan ran for the 142nd district seat to succeed Frank Farry, who vacated the position to run for the Pennsylvania State Senate. Hogan was declared the winner by a margin of 76 votes following a recount and the discovery of an untabulated voting machine in Lower Southampton. Initial unofficial results had shown his opponent, Mark Moffa, leading by two votes.

Pennsylvania House of Representatives
Preceded by Frank Farry	Member of the Pennsylvania House of Representatives from the 142nd district 2023–present	Incumbent
