= Shelby Labs =

American politician

Member of the Pennsylvania House of Representatives from the 143rd district
- Incumbent
- Assumed office January 5, 2021
- Preceded by: Wendy Ullman

Personal details
- Party: Republican
- Education: Temple University (BA)
- Website: Official website

Shelby Labs is an American politician. She is a Republican member of the Pennsylvania House of Representatives, representing the 143rd district in Bucks County since 2021.

== Biography ==
Labs graduated from Central Bucks High School West in 2005, and received a BA in communications from Temple University in 2009.

In 2020, Labs was elected to the Pennsylvania House of Representatives representing the 143rd district, which is part of Bucks County. She defeated incumbent Democratic representative Wendy Ullman with 51.5% of the vote in the general election.
