= Pennsylvania House of Representatives, District 12 =

American legislative district

Pennsylvania's 12th State House of Representatives district
Representative
| Brandon Dukes; D–Cranberry Township, Butler County |
- Population (2022): 64,712

The 12th Pennsylvania House of Representatives District is in western Pennsylvania. As of September 2026, the district has been represented by Democrat Brandon Dukes, who was elected in a special election following the resignation of Republican Stephenie Scialabba.

== District profile ==
The 12th Pennsylvania House of Representatives District is located in Butler County and includes the following areas:

- Adams Township
- Callery
- Cranberry Township
- Evans City
- Harmony
- Jackson Township
- Mars
- Seven Fields
- Valencia
- Zelienople

== Representatives ==
| Representative | Party | Years | District home | Notes |
Before 1969, seats were apportioned by county.
| H. Francis Kennedy | Republican | 1969 – 1974 | Butler | Moved from the 2nd Butler County district. Defeated in general election. |
| James A. Green | Democrat | 1975 – 1976 | Slippery Rock | Did not run for re-election. |
| James M. Burd | Republican | 1977 – 1990 | Saxonburg | Defeated in general election. |
| Patricia Carone | Democrat | 1991 – 1998 | Lancaster Township | Did not run for re-election. |
| Daryl Metcalfe | Republican | 1999 – 2023 | Cranberry Township | |
| Stephenie Scialabba | Republican | 2023 – 2026 | Cranberry Township | Resigned |
| Brandon Dukes | Democratic | 2026 – present | Cranberry Township | Elected to fill vacancy |

== Recent election results ==
PA House special election, 2026: Pennsylvania House, District 12
| Party | Candidate | Votes | % |
|---|---|---|---|
| Democratic | Brandon Dukes | 8,434 | 50.26 |
| Republican | Scott Timko | 8,346 | 49.74 |
| Total votes | | 16,780 | 100.00 |
| Democratic gain from Republican | | | |

PA House election, 2024: Pennsylvania House, District 12
| Party | Candidate | Votes | % |
|---|---|---|---|
| Republican | Stephenie Scialabba (incumbent) | 27,839 | 64.83 |
| Democratic | Robert Vigue | 15,103 | 35.17 |
| Total votes | | 42,942 | 100.00 |
| Republican hold | | | |

PA House election, 2022: Pennsylvania House, District 12
| Party | Candidate | Votes | % |
|---|---|---|---|
| Republican | Stephenie Scialabba | 20,996 | 62.25 |
| Democratic | Robert Vigue | 12,734 | 37.75 |
| Total votes | | 33,730 | 100.00 |
| Republican hold | | | |

PA House election, 2020: Pennsylvania House, District 12
| Party | Candidate | Votes | % |
|---|---|---|---|
| Republican | Daryl Metcalfe (incumbent) | 26,909 | 61.67 |
| Democratic | Daniel Smith, Jr. | 16,724 | 38.33 |
| Total votes | | 43,633 | 100.00 |
| Republican hold | | | |

PA House election, 2018: Pennsylvania House, District 12
| Party | Candidate | Votes | % |
|---|---|---|---|
| Republican | Daryl Metcalfe (incumbent) | 18,086 | 58.33 |
| Democratic | Daniel Smith, Jr. | 12,922 | 41.67 |
| Total votes | | 31,008 | 100.00 |
| Republican hold | | | |

PA House election, 2016: Pennsylvania House, District 12
| Party | Candidate | Votes | % |
|---|---|---|---|
| Republican | Daryl Metcalfe (incumbent) | 24,405 | 67.84 |
| Democratic | Christian Rieger | 11,572 | 32.16 |
| Total votes | | 35,977 | 100.00 |
| Republican hold | | | |

PA House election, 2014: Pennsylvania House, District 12
| Party | Candidate | Votes | % |
|---|---|---|---|
| Republican | Daryl Metcalfe (incumbent) | 12,458 | 61.71 |
| Democratic | Lisa Inez Zucco | 7,731 | 38.29 |
| Total votes | | 20,189 | 100.00 |
| Republican hold | | | |

PA House election, 2012: Pennsylvania House, District 12
| Party | Candidate | Votes | % |
|---|---|---|---|
| Republican | Daryl Metcalfe (incumbent) | Unopposed | |
| Total votes | | 29,567 | 100.00 |
| Republican hold | | | |

PA House election, 2010: Pennsylvania House, District 12
| Party | Candidate | Votes | % |
|---|---|---|---|
| Republican | Daryl Metcalfe (incumbent) | 19,851 | 75.39 |
| Democratic | Zack Byrnes | 6,479 | 24.61 |
| Total votes | | 26,330 | 100.00 |
| Republican hold | | | |
