= Pennsylvania House of Representatives, District 18 =

American legislative district

Pennsylvania's 18th State House of Representatives district
Representative
K.C. Tomlinson; R–Bensalem
- Population (2022): 63,773

The 18th Pennsylvania House of Representatives District is located in Southeastern Pennsylvania. The seat is occupied by Republican K.C. Tomlinson, who has held the seat since a special election on March 17, 2020.

The seat was previously vacant for two months after Gene DiGirolamo left the seat which he had held since 1995 to join the Bucks County Board of Commissioners.

== District profile ==
Pennsylvania's 18th District is located in Bucks County and includes the following areas:

- Bensalem Township
- Hulmeville

== Representatives ==
Representative	Party	Years	District home	Note
Prior to 1969, seats were apportioned by county.
Andrew Fenrich	Democrat	1969 – 1973	Pittsburgh, Pennsylvania	
Edward F. Burns, Jr.	Republican	1973 – 1990	Bensalem, Pennsylvania	
Tommy Tomlinson	Republican	1991 – 1994	Bensalem, Pennsylvania	Elected to Pennsylvania Senate
Gene DiGirolamo	Republican	1995 – 2020	Bensalem, Pennsylvania	Elected to Bucks County Board of Commissioners
K.C. Tomlinson	Republican	2020 – present	Bensalem, Pennsylvania	

== Recent election results ==
PA House election, 2024: Pennsylvania House, District 18
Party	Candidate	Votes	%
Republican	K.C. Tomlinson (incumbent)	18,176	55.64
Democratic	Anand Patel	14,489	44.36
Total votes		32,665	100.00
Republican hold			

PA House election, 2022: Pennsylvania House, District 18
Party	Candidate	Votes	%
Republican	K.C. Tomlinson (incumbent)	12,558	52.29
Democratic	Laurie Smith	11,459	47.71
Total votes		24,017	100.00
Republican hold			

PA House election, 2020: Pennsylvania House, District 18
Party	Candidate	Votes	%
Republican	K.C. Tomlinson (incumbent)	16,711	52.32
Democratic	Harold Hayes	15,228	47.68
Total votes		31,939	100.00
Republican hold			

PA House special election, 2020: Pennsylvania House, District 18
Party	Candidate	Votes	%
Republican	K.C. Tomlinson	4,516	55.23
Democratic	Harold Hayes	3,661	44.77
Total votes		8,177	100.00
Republican hold			

PA House election, 2018: Pennsylvania House, District 18
Party	Candidate	Votes	%
Republican	Gene DiGirolamo (incumbent)	12,870	56.53
Democratic	Jimmy Lamb	9,897	43.47
Total votes		22,767	100.00
Republican hold			

PA House election, 2016: Pennsylvania House, District 18
Party	Candidate	Votes	%
Republican	Gene DiGirolamo (incumbent)	Unopposed	
Total votes		19,506	100.00
Republican hold			

PA House election, 2014: Pennsylvania House, District 18
Party	Candidate	Votes	%
Republican	Gene DiGirolamo (incumbent)	Unopposed	
Total votes		11,551	100.00
Republican hold			

PA House election, 2012: Pennsylvania House, District 18
Party	Candidate	Votes	%
Republican	Gene DiGirolamo (incumbent)	Unopposed	
Total votes		18,838	100.00
Republican hold			

PA House election, 2010: Pennsylvania House, District 18
Party	Candidate	Votes	%
Republican	Gene DiGirolamo (incumbent)	Unopposed	
Total votes		14,117	100.00
Republican hold			
