= Ana Tiburcio =

American politician

Member of the Pennsylvania House of Representatives from the 22nd district
- Incumbent
- Assumed office March 23, 2026
- Preceded by: Joshua Siegel

Personal details
- Party: Democratic
- Education: Dieruff High School

Ana Tiburcio is an American politician who is a representative in the Pennsylvania House of Representatives from the 22nd district, based in Allentown. A member of the Democratic Party, she won a special election in February 2026.

Tiburcio is a graduate of Dieruff High School in Allentown, Pennsylvania. She lived in New York for a time before moving back. She was active in volunteer efforts in Allentown. In 2022, Tiburcio joined the Allentown School Board. Three years later, State Representative Joshua Siegel from the 22nd district resigned after being elected Lehigh County executive. Tiburcio was nominated by the Democratic Party for the February 2026 special to replace Siegel; she was nominated hours before the filing deadline after the party's previous nominee was forced to withdraw because he did not meet the residency requirement to be a candidate in the election. Tiburcio defeated Republican candidate Robert E. Smith Jr. In the May primary election, Tiburcio was defeated by Ce-Ce Gerlach, an Allentown councilwoman who ran with Siegel's endorsement.
