= Pennsylvania House of Representatives, District 143 =

American legislative district

Pennsylvania's 143rd State House of Representatives district
Representative
| Shelby Labs; R–Plumstead Township |
- Population (2020): 65,742

The 143rd Pennsylvania House of Representatives District is located in Southeastern Pennsylvania and has been represented since 2021 by Republican Shelby Labs.

== District profile ==
The 143rd Pennsylvania House of Representatives District is located in Bucks County. It includes the Stover-Myers Mill. It is made up of the following areas:

- Bedminster Township
- Dublin
- Hilltown Township
- New Britain Township (part)
  - District East
  - District West
- Perkasie
- Plumstead Township
- Sellersville
- Silverdale
- Tinicum Township

== Representatives ==
| Representative | Party | Years | District home | Note |
Prior to 1969, seats were apportioned by county.
| John S. Renninger | Republican | 1969–1976 | | |
| Margaret H. George | Democrat | 1977–1980 | | |
| James C. Greenwood | Republican | 1981–1986 | | |
| David W. Heckler | Republican | 1987–1993 | | Resigned 1993. |
| Charles T. McIlhinney, Jr. | Republican | 1998–2006 | | Elected February 3, 1998 to fill vacancy |
| Marguerite Quinn | Republican | 2007–2018 | Doylestown | |
| Wendy Ullman | Democrat | 2019–2020 | Plumstead Township | |
| Shelby Labs | Republican | 2021–present | Plumstead Township | |

== Recent election results ==
PA House election, 2022: Pennsylvania House, District 143
| Party | Candidate | Votes | % |
|---|---|---|---|
| Republican | Shelby Labs (incumbent) | 18,418 | 53.18 |
| Democratic | Gwendolyn Stoltz | 16,215 | 46.82 |
| Total votes | | 34,633 | 100.00 |
| Republican hold | | | |

PA House election, 2020: Pennsylvania House, District 143
| Party | Candidate | Votes | % |
|---|---|---|---|
| Republican | Shelby Labs | 22,553 | 51.53 |
| Democratic | Wendy Ullman (incumbent) | 21,217 | 48.47 |
| Total votes | | 43,770 | 100.00 |
| Republican gain from Democratic | | | |

PA House election, 2018: Pennsylvania House, District 143
| Party | Candidate | Votes | % |
|---|---|---|---|
| Democratic | Wendy Ullman | 17,339 | 50.84 |
| Republican | Joseph Flood | 16,763 | 49.16 |
| Total votes | | 34,102 | 100.00 |
| Democratic gain from Republican | | | |

PA House election, 2016: Pennsylvania House, District 143
| Party | Candidate | Votes | % |
|---|---|---|---|
| Republican | Marguerite Quinn (incumbent) | 24,033 | 63.75 |
| Democratic | Stephen Kunkel | 13,663 | 36.25 |
| Total votes | | 37,696 | 100.00 |
| Republican hold | | | |

PA House election, 2014: Pennsylvania House, District 143
| Party | Candidate | Votes | % |
|---|---|---|---|
| Republican | Marguerite Quinn (incumbent) | Unopposed | |
| Total votes | | 17,107 | 100.00 |
| Republican hold | | | |

PA House election, 2012: Pennsylvania House, District 143
| Party | Candidate | Votes | % |
|---|---|---|---|
| Republican | Marguerite Quinn (incumbent) | 21,483 | 61.80 |
| Democratic | Joseph Frederick | 13,280 | 38.20 |
| Total votes | | 34,763 | 100.00 |
| Republican hold | | | |

PA House election, 2010: Pennsylvania House, District 143
| Party | Candidate | Votes | % |
|---|---|---|---|
| Republican | Marguerite Quinn (incumbent) | 16,357 | 62.78 |
| Democratic | Kathy McQuarrie | 8,637 | 33.15 |
| Independent | Tom Lingenfelter | 1,059 | 4.06 |
| Total votes | | 26,053 | 100.00 |
| Republican hold | | | |
