= Valerie Gaydos =

American politician

Member of the Pennsylvania House of Representatives from the 44th district
- Incumbent
- Assumed office December 1, 2018
- Preceded by: Mark Mustio

Personal details
- Born: July 3, 1967 (age 59) Pittsburgh, Pennsylvania, U.S.
- Party: Republican
- Education: Dickinson College (BA)

Valerie Gaydos (born July 3, 1967) is an American businesswoman and politician serving as a member of the Pennsylvania House of Representatives from the 44th district. Elected in November 2018, she assumed office on December 1, 2018.

== Early life and education ==
Gaydos was born in Pittsburgh in 1967. After graduating from Sewickley Academy in 1986, she earned a Bachelor of Arts degree in Russian language and economics from Dickinson College in 1989.

== Career ==
Gaydos began her public service career in 1989 as a legislative assistant for the Pennsylvania State Senate's Republican Caucus, and continued in that role until 1992, when she was hired as the director of the Greater Baltimore Technology Council. She worked for the council until 1995.

She founded Capitol Growth, Inc. in Baltimore, Maryland in 1994. By 2002, her firm was operating in Harrisburg, Pennsylvania. She continues as the company's president and chief executive officer, according to her current Pennsylvania House of Representatives biography.

In 2002, she founded 51st Associates, LLC and continues to serve as that company's president as well. She then founded the Angel Venture Forum in 2012 and remains that firm's president.

Gaydos was elected to the Pennsylvania House of Representatives in November 2018 and assumed office on December 1, 2018. During the 2019–2020 legislative session, Gaydos served as chair of the House Commerce Committee's Subcommittee on Economic Development. In the 2021–2022 session, she chaired the Commerce Committee's Subcommittee on Small Business and served as secretary of the House Liquor Control Committee.

Since her initial victory, she has been re-elected to three additional consecutive terms, in 2020, 2022, and 2024.
