= 2019 Pennsylvania elections =

- November 5, 2019

Elections were held in Pennsylvania on November 5, 2019, to fill judicial positions on the Superior Court, allow judicial retention votes, and fill numerous county, local and municipal offices, the most prominent being the Mayor of Philadelphia.

The necessary primary elections were held in May 2019. In addition, special elections for legislative vacancies were held at various times in 2019.

== Special elections ==
=== U.S. House of Representatives ===
==== 12th congressional district ====
A special election for Pennsylvania's 12th congressional district was held on May 21, 2019 following the resignation of Republican Representative Tom Marino.

=== Pennsylvania State Senate ===
==== 33rd senatorial district ====
A special election for the 33rd senatorial district was held on May 21 following Republican State Senator Richard Alloway's resignation from the chamber.

Democrats selected Spring Grove director of community development Sarah Hammond as their nominee. Republicans nominated retired Army colonel Doug Mastriano.

Pennsylvania Senate, District 33 special election, 2019
Party	Candidate	Votes	%
Republican	Doug Mastriano	20,595	68.46
Democratic	Sarah Hammond	9,490	31.54
Total votes		30,085	100.00
Republican hold			

==== 37th senatorial district ====
A special election for the 37th senatorial district was called for April 2, 2019 following Republican State Senator Guy Reschenthaler's election to the United States House of Representatives.

Democrats selected Pam Iovino as their nominee, and Republicans nominated D. Raja.

Pennsylvania Senate, District 37 special election, 2019
Party	Candidate	Votes	%
Democratic	Pam Iovino	33,401	51.98
Republican	D. Raja	30,854	48.02
Total votes		64,255	100.00
Democratic gain from Republican			

==== 41st senatorial district ====
A special election for the 41st senatorial district was held on May 21 following Republican State Senator Don White's retirement from the chamber.

Democrats selected Indiana University of Pennsylvania professor Susan Boser as their nominee. Republicans nominated White's chief of staff Joe Pittman.

Pennsylvania Senate, District 41 special election, 2019
Party	Candidate	Votes	%
Republican	Joe Pittman	25,017	65.43
Democratic	Susan Boser	13,219	34.57
Total votes		38,236	100.00
Republican hold			

=== Pennsylvania House of Representatives ===
==== 11th legislative district ====
State Representative Brian Ellis resigned in March 2019 in the midst of a sexual assault investigation. A special election for the 11th legislative district was held on May 21 (alongside the 2019 primary) to fill Ellis' vacancy.

Democrats selected steelworker Sam Doctor as their nominee, and Republicans nominated Marci Mustello, a scheduler for Congressman Mike Kelly.

Pennsylvania House of Representatives, District 11 special election, 2019
Party	Candidate	Votes	%
Republican	Marci Mustello	5,953	57.49
Democratic	Sam Doctor	4,402	42.51
Total votes		10,355	100.00
Republican hold			

==== 85th legislative district ====
A special election for the 85th legislative district was held on August 20 following Republican State Representative Fred Keller's election to the United States House of Representatives.

Democrats selected physician and school board director Dr. Jennifer Rager-Kay as their nominee, and Republicans nominated David Rowe, vice chair of the East Buffalo Township board of supervisors.

Pennsylvania House of Representatives, District 85 special election, 2019
Party	Candidate	Votes	%
Republican	David H. Rowe	6,489	62.59
Democratic	Jennifer Rager-Kay	3,879	37.41
Total votes		10,368	100.00
Republican hold			

==== 114th legislative district ====
State Representative Sid Michaels Kavulich died in October 2018, but was still re-elected in the 2018 elections. A special election for the 114th legislative district was held on March 12, 2019 to fill Kavulich's vacancy.

Democrats selected Bridget Malloy Kosierowski as their nominee, and Republicans nominated Frank Scavo.

Pennsylvania House of Representatives, District 114 special election, 2019
Party	Candidate	Votes	%
Democratic	Bridget Malloy Kosierowski	6,718	62.45
Republican	Frank Scavo III	4,040	37.55
Total votes		10,758	100.00
Democratic hold			

==== 190th legislative district ====
State Representative Vanessa Lowery Brown was re-elected in the 2018 elections, but resigned in December 2018 after being convicted of bribery. A special election for the 190th legislative district was held on March 12, 2019 to fill Brown's vacancy.

Democrats selected Movita Johnson-Harrell as their nominee, and Republicans nominated Michael Harvey. Two additional candidates, Amen Brown and Pam Williams, ran as independents.

Pennsylvania House of Representatives, District 190 special election, 2019
Party	Candidate	Votes	%
Democratic	Movita Johnson-Harrell	3,188	66.61
Amen Brown Party	Amen Brown	958	20.02
Working Families	Pamela Williams	511	10.68
Republican	Michael Harvey	129	2.70
Total votes		10,758	100.00
Democratic hold			

== Judge of the Superior Court ==
2019 Pennsylvania Superior Court election
- November 5, 2019

2 seats of the Superior Court of Pennsylvania
	Majority party	Minority party
Candidate	Daniel McCaffery; Amanda Green-Hawkins	Megan McCarthy King; Christylee Peck
Party	Democratic	Republican
Last election	7	8
Seats won	1	1
Seat change	▲1	Steady
Popular vote	2,509,485	2,418,266
Percentage	50.93%	49.07%
- County results Democrat: 50–60% 60–70% 80–90% Republican: 50–60% 60–70% 70–80% 80–90%

Two open seats on the 15-member court were up for election.

- First seat is a vacant seat due to retirement of Judge Kate Ford Elliott, a Democrat, in 2017.
- Second seat up for election, after Judge Paula Ott, a Republican, decided not to seek retention to another 10-year term.

=== Democratic primary ===
==== Candidates ====
- Amanda Green-Hawkins, counsel, United Steelworkers; former Allegheny County councilwoman
- Daniel McCaffery, Judge of the Philadelphia County Court of Common Pleas
- Beth Tarasi, attorney, candidate for Pennsylvania's 17th congressional district in 2018

===== Withdrawn =====
- Ryan James, criminal trial lawyer

==== Results ====
Democratic primary results (vote for 2)
Party	Candidate	Votes	%
Democratic	Amanda Green-Hawkins	480,225	37.97%
Democratic	Daniel McCaffery	407,660	32.23%
Democratic	Beth Tarasi	376,885	29.80%
Total votes		1,264,770	100.0%

=== Republican primary ===
==== Candidates ====
- Megan McCarthy King, Chester County deputy district attorney
- Christylee Peck, Judge of the Cumberland County Court of Common Pleas
- Rebecca Warren, former Montour County district attorney (2011–2015)

==== Results ====
Republican primary results (vote for 2)
Party	Candidate	Votes	%
Republican	Megan McCarthy King	370,084	35.59%
Republican	Christylee Peck	348,271	33.49%
Republican	Rebecca Warren	321,536	30.92%
Total votes		1,039,891	100.0%

=== General election ===
==== Results ====
2019 Pennsylvania Superior Court election (vote for 2)
Party	Candidate	Votes	%
Democratic	Daniel McCaffery	1,273,658	25.85%
Republican	Megan McCarthy King	1,252,065	25.41%
Democratic	Amanda Green-Hawkins	1,235,827	25.08%
Republican	Christylee Peck	1,166,201	23.67%
Total votes		4,927,751	100.0%
Democratic hold			
Republican hold			

== Judicial retention ==
=== Superior Court ===
Judge Anne Lazarus Retention (D), 2019
Choice	Votes	%
For	1,500,891	74.49
Against	513,912	25.51
Total	2,014,803	100.00
Source: PA Department of State

Judge Judy Olson (R) Retention, 2019
Choice	Votes	%
For	1,461,332	74.06
Against	511,747	25.94
Total	1,973,079	100.00
Source: PA Department of State

=== Commonwealth Court ===
Judge P. Kevin Brobson (R) Retention, 2019
Choice	Votes	%
For	1,393,158	71.72
Against	549,432	28.28
Total	1,942,590	100.00
Source: PA Department of State

Judge Patricia McCullough (R) Retention, 2019
Choice	Votes	%
For	1,474,584	75.02
Against	491,040	24.98
Total	1,965,624	100.00
Source: PA Department of State

== Ballot questions ==
At the statewide level, Pennsylvania voted on a constitutional amendment for Marsy's Law, though results of the measure were never certified following a lawsuit.
