= Stacy Garrity =

American politician and businesswoman (born 1964)

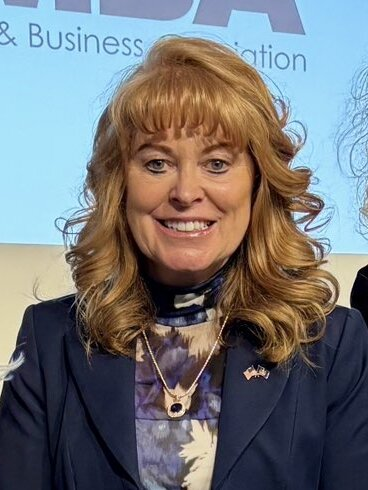
- Garrity in 2025

79th Treasurer of Pennsylvania
- Incumbent
- Assumed office January 19, 2021
- Governor: Tom Wolf; Josh Shapiro
- Preceded by: Joe Torsella

Personal details
- Born: May 17, 1964 (age 62) Athens, Pennsylvania, U.S.
- Party: Republican
- Spouse: Daniel Gizzi
- Education: Bloomsburg University (BA)
- Website: Office website Campaign website

Military service
- Branch/service: United States Army; Army Reserve
- Years of service: 1986–2016
- Rank: Colonel
- Battles/wars: Gulf War; Iraq War
- Awards: Bronze Star Medal (2); Legion of Merit

Stacy L. Garrity (born May 17, 1964) is an American politician, businesswoman, and former United States Army Reserve officer who has served as the 79th treasurer of Pennsylvania since 2021. A Republican, she defeated incumbent Democrat Joe Torsella in 2020 despite being outraised and trailing in polls. She won reelection in 2024, defeating Democratic challenger Erin McClelland with 51.9% of the vote.

Garrity served for 30 years in the Army Reserve, deploying three times during the Gulf and Iraq Wars and earning the nickname "The Angel of the Desert." She retired as a colonel in 2016. She worked at Global Tungsten & Powders Corp. from 1987 to 2021, rising to vice president. In 2019, she lost the Republican primary for Pennsylvania's 12th congressional district to Fred Keller. In August 2025, she announced her candidacy for governor of Pennsylvania in 2026, which she lost to incumbent governor Josh Shapiro in a landslide.

== Early life and education ==
Garrity was born on May 17, 1964, in Athens, Pennsylvania. She attended Sayre Area High School in Sayre, Pennsylvania and later graduated from Bloomsburg University of Pennsylvania with a degree in finance and economics, later earning a certificate from the Cornell University Business Management Institute.

== Military career ==
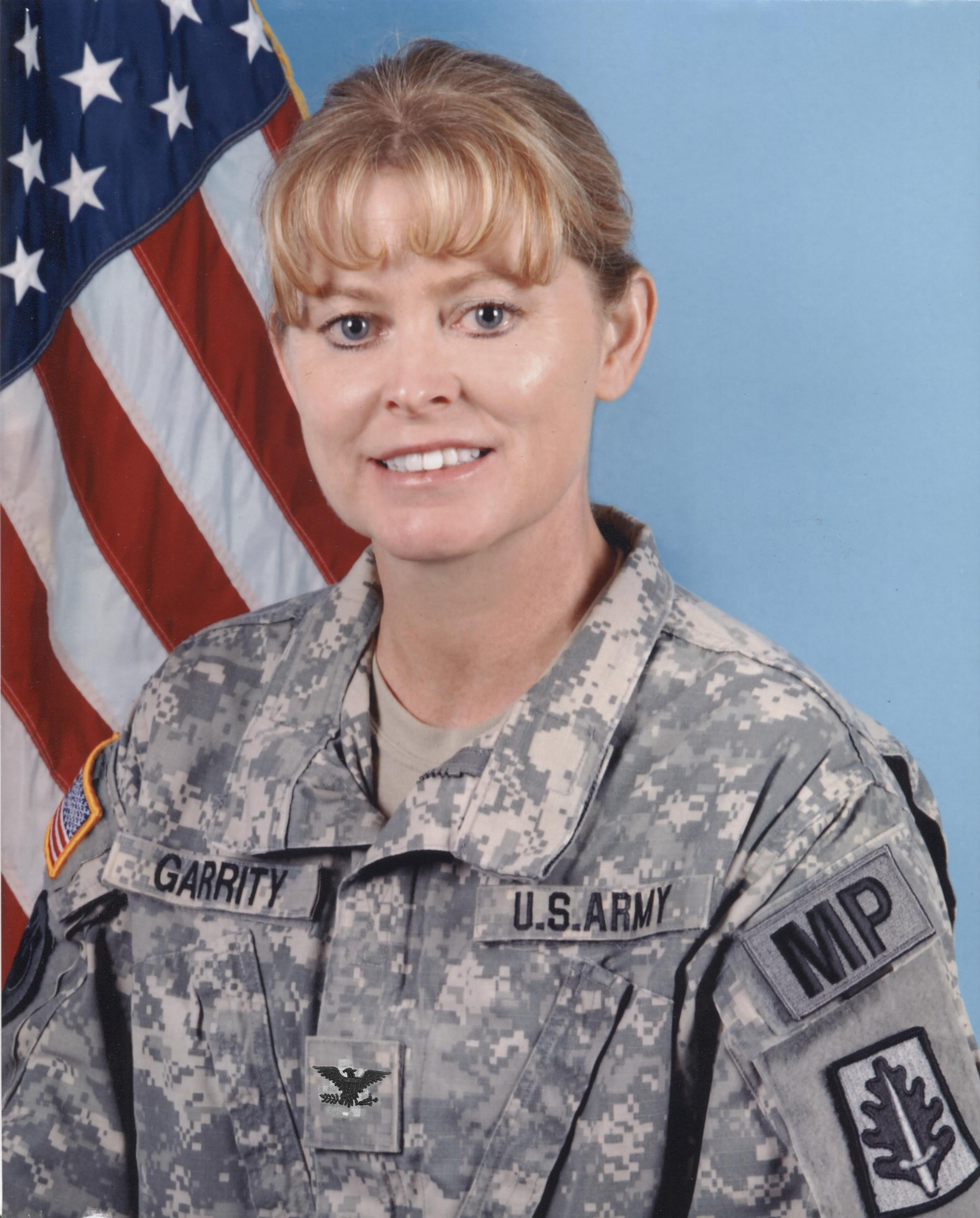
Garrity in the U.S. Army

Garrity served in the United States Army Reserve from 1986 to 2016, reaching a final rank of colonel. While in the Army Reserve, Garrity served as a military police officer. Garrity was deployed three times during her military career: in 1991 for the Gulf War, and in 2003–2004 as well as 2008–2009 for the Iraq War.

Garrity was stationed at Camp Bucca in southern Iraq during the Iraq War. She worked to process detainees, manage family visitations, and act as a Red Cross liaison. It was here Garrity obtained the nickname "The Angel of the Desert" or "The Angel of Camp Bucca" for her affection when dealing with the prisoners housed at the camp. Garrity earned two Bronze Stars and the Legion of Merit before retiring in 2016.

== Business career ==
Garrity worked at Global Tungsten & Powders Corp. (GTP) from 1987 to 2021. GTP is a producer of tungsten and metallurgic products based in Pennsylvania. Before leaving GTP to become Pennsylvania Treasurer, Garrity's final position at the company was vice president for Government Affairs and Industry Liaison. In 2018, while Garrity managed government affairs for Global Tungsten & Powders, she successfully lobbied Congress to ban the U.S. military from purchasing any tungsten from China, Russia, North Korea, and Iran.

In 2017, Global Tungsten & Powders was sued in federal court by a competitor company, Tungsten Heavy Powder and Parts, for defamation. Tungsten Heavy Powder and Parts alleged that Garrity spread defamatory statements about them at an industry event. The claims made by Tungsten Heavy Powder and Parts were dismissed in a court of law, and Tungsten Heavy Powder and Parts was ordered to pay over $5 million in damages.

== Political career ==
=== Congressional campaign ===
In 2019, Garrity ran for the Republican nomination in a special election for Pennsylvania's 12th Congressional district after the resignation of incumbent Republican Tom Marino. Garrity lost the nomination to state representative Fred Keller, who was supported by president Donald Trump and eventually won the seat. After losing the Congressional nomination, Garrity pursued the 2020 race for treasurer.

=== Pennsylvania treasurer ===
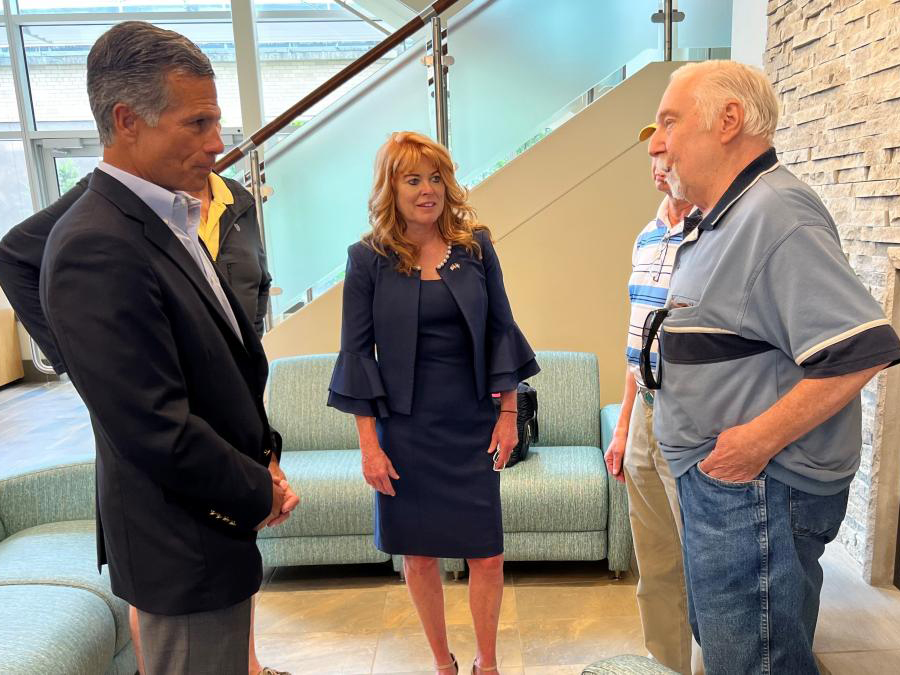
Garrity (center) with Dan Meuser and Matt Cartwright in 2023.

==== Comments on the 2020 presidential election ====
On multiple occasions, Garrity has supported Donald Trump's false claims that he won the 2020 presidential election. On January 5, 2021, she spoke at a rally in Harrisburg asking lawmakers to decertify Pennsylvania's election results. On May 6, 2022, Garrity appeared at a rally with former president Trump and 2022 U.S. Senate candidate Mehmet Oz in Greensburg, endorsing Trump's false claim to have won the 2020 election.

==== First term ====
Garrity challenged incumbent Democrat Joe Torsella for Pennsylvania treasurer in January 2020, winning the Republican nomination unopposed in June. Garrity charged that Torsella was mainly interested in the office to boost his profile and run for higher office, such as the state's governorship. She criticized Torsella's management of the office and alleged a lack of transparency, citing a D− rating given by the Public Interest Research Group in 2019.

On November 10, 2020, a week after election day, Torsella called Garrity to concede the race, with Garrity leading by 78,000 votes at the time of his concession. It was the first time a Republican had unseated an incumbent Democrat for a statewide office in Pennsylvania since 1994.

In May 2021, Garrity joined a critical letter sent by several Republican state treasurers to the Biden administration, charging that the administration was inappropriately encouraging financial institutions to stop supporting fossil fuels. The letter said that the government should not "bully corporations into curtailing legal activities," but it also threatened that the state governments represented by the signatory officials may divest their state funds from any banks that no longer support fossil fuel projects. Garrity's participation in this letter was criticized by an editorial in the Hazelton Standard-Speaker.

In honor of National College Savings Day in 2021, Garrity had the Pennsylvania Treasury offer $100 to families that opened 529 college savings plans.

In 2021, in her ex-officio capacity on the board of the Pennsylvania Public School Employees' Retirement System, Garrity joined a group of "dissident" board members opposing the contemporary management of the pension fund's investments, arguing instead that the pension fund should invest in low-fee, public investments. After failing to dismiss the fund's managers, the dissident group of board members, including Garrity's predecessor Joe Torsella, successfully blocked an investment strategy proposed by the fund managers in September 2021.

In 2022, Garrity opposed governor Tom Wolf's proposal to award state employees with five days vacation from work if they got vaccinated for COVID-19, claiming that it would cost the state government 100 million dollars. The Wolf administration claimed that Garrity's cost estimate was seriously exaggerated. Pennsylvania Secretary of Administration Michael Newsome, whose position reports to the governor, estimated the cost of the vacation incentives to be $45 million.

On March 15, 2023, Garrity joined state senator John DiSanto in introducing legislation that will automatically return unclaimed property to Pennsylvania residents. Pennsylvania Money Match will authorize Treasury to automatically return single-owner property for living individuals valued up to $5,000 to the rightful owner after a thorough identification and verification process.

In October 2023, Garrity announced that she had purchased $20 million in Israel Bonds for the state's investment portfolio, bringing Pennsylvania's investment in Israel Bonds to a total of $56 million.

==== Second term ====
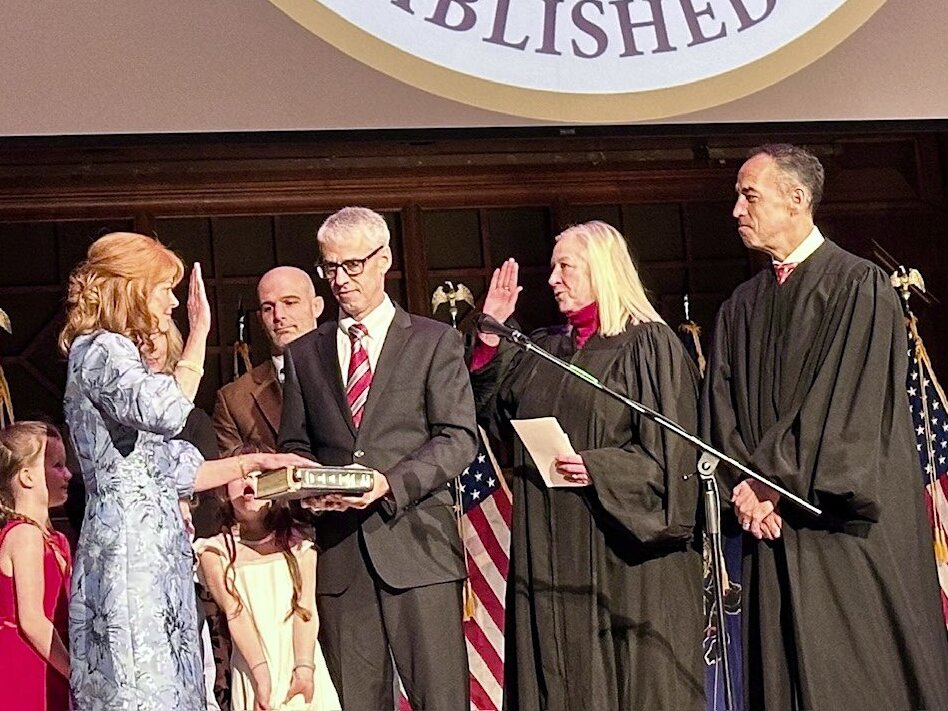
Garrity during her second inauguration in 2025.

In 2024, Garrity ran for a second term as state treasurer. She defeated Democratic challenger Erin McClelland in the general election. Garrity received more than 3.5 million votes, the most cast for any statewide candidate in Pennsylvania history.

In 2025, Garrity introduced a program offering $500 million in low-interest loans to county and local governments who had been affected by a state budget impasse, which had put local funding on hold due to the budget being three months overdue.

Garrity is a vocal supporter of the One Big Beautiful Bill Act passed by Congressional Republicans in July 2025. The legislation cut $186 billion from the Supplemental Nutrition Assistance Program (SNAP) and $1 trillion from Medicaid.

=== 2026 gubernatorial campaign ===
In August 2025, Garrity launched her bid for governor of Pennsylvania against incumbent Josh Shapiro. President Donald Trump endorsed Garrity." In March 2026, Trump hosted a fundraiser for her at Mar-a-Lago. Primary elections were held on May 19, 2026, in which Garrity won the primary uncontested. Within minutes of the polls closing Democrat Josh Shapiro was announced as having defeated Stacy Garrity in the 2026 PA governors race.

== Electoral history ==
2020 Pennsylvania State Treasurer Republican primary election
| Party | Candidate | Votes | % |
|---|---|---|---|
| Republican | Stacy Garrity | 1,047,510 | 100.00% |
| Total votes | | 1,047,510 | 100.00% |

2020 Pennsylvania State Treasurer election
| Party | Candidate | Votes | % | ±% |
|---|---|---|---|---|
| Republican | Stacy Garrity | 3,291,877 | 48.68% | +4.47% |
| Democratic | Joe Torsella (incumbent) | 3,239,331 | 47.91% | −2.75% |
| Libertarian | Joseph Soloski | 148,614 | 2.20% | −0.05% |
| Green | Timothy Runkle | 81,984 | 1.21% | −1.67% |
| Total votes | | 6,761,806 | 100.00% | |
| Republican gain from Democratic | | | | |

2024 Pennsylvania State Treasurer election
| Party | Candidate | Votes | % | ±% |
|---|---|---|---|---|
| Republican | Stacy Garrity (incumbent) | 3,542,336 | 51.91% | +3.23% |
| Democratic | Erin McClelland | 3,115,393 | 45.65% | −2.26% |
| Libertarian | Nick Ciesielski | 99,228 | 1.45% | −0.75% |
| Constitution | Troy Bowman | 40,886 | 0.60% | N/A |
| Forward | Chris Foster | 26,753 | 0.39% | N/A |
| Total votes | | 6,824,596 | 100.00% | |
| Republican hold | | | | |

Party political offices
| Preceded by Otto Voit | Republican nominee for Treasurer of Pennsylvania; 2020, 2024 | Most recent |
| Preceded by Doug Mastriano | Republican nominee for Governor of Pennsylvania; 2026 | Most recent |
Political offices
| Preceded by Joe Torsella | Treasurer of Pennsylvania; 2021–present | Incumbent |
