= 2020 Pennsylvania State Treasurer election =

- November 3, 2020
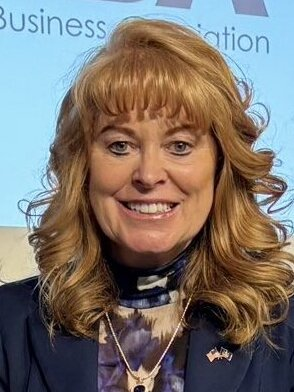

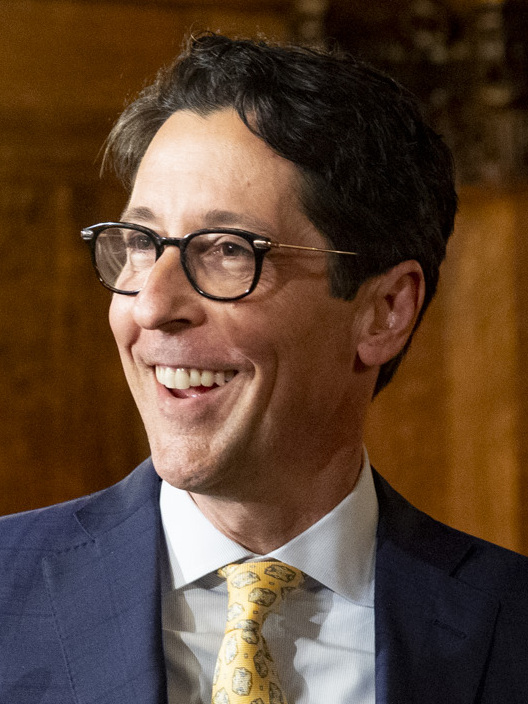
Nominee	Stacy Garrity	Joe Torsella
Party	Republican	Democratic
Popular vote	3,291,877	3,239,331
Percentage	48.68%	47.91%
- Garrity: 40–50% 50–60% 60–70% 70–80% 80–90% >90% Torsella: 40–50% 50–60% 60–70% 70–80% 80–90% >90% Tie: 40–50% No data
Treasurer before election
Joe Torsella
Democratic
Elected Treasurer
Stacy Garrity
Republican

The Pennsylvania Treasurer election of 2020 took place on November 3, 2020. Primary elections were originally due to take place on April 28, 2020. However, following concerns regarding the coronavirus pandemic the primaries were delayed until June 2, 2020. Incumbent Democratic State Treasurer Joe Torsella lost re-election to a second term to Republican Stacy Garrity.

On November 10, 2020, a week following election day, Torsella conceded to Garrity as she led him with 48.9% of the vote. Garrity's victory was an upset, with Torsella having a sizable fundraising advantage and consistently leading in polling throughout the campaign.

== Democratic primary ==
=== Candidates ===
==== Nominee ====
- Joe Torsella, incumbent Pennsylvania Treasurer

=== Results ===
Democratic primary results
Party	Candidate	Votes	%
Democratic	Joe Torsella (incumbent)	1,381,763	100.0%
Total votes		1,381,763	100.0%

== Republican primary ==
=== Candidates ===
==== Nominee ====
- Stacy Garrity, businesswoman, U.S. military veteran, and candidate for Pennsylvania’s 12th congressional district in 2019

=== Results ===
Republican primary results
Party	Candidate	Votes	%
Republican	Stacy Garrity	1,047,510	100.0%
Total votes		1,047,510	100.0%

== General election ==
=== Endorsements ===
Joe Torsella (D)

Executive branch officials

- Barack Obama, former president of the United States (2009–2017)

=== Polling ===
Poll source	Date(s) administered	Sample size (Note: Key: A – all adults RV – registered voters LV – likely voters V – unclear)	Margin of error	Joe Torsella (D)	Stacy Garrity (R)	Other	Undecided
Monmouth University	September 28 – October 4, 2020	500 (RV)	± 4.4%	47%	41%	2% (Note: "No one" and Soloski (L) with 1%; "Other candidate" and Runkle (G) with 0%)	10%
Monmouth University	September 28 – October 4, 2020	500 (LV)	± 4.4%	47% (Note: With a likely voter turnout model featuring high turnout)	42%	–	–
Monmouth University	September 28 – October 4, 2020	500 (LV)	± 4.4%	47% (Note: With a likely voter turnout model featuring low turnout)	43%	–	–
CPEC	September 15–17, 2020	830 (LV)	± 2.3%	24%	16%	1%	58%
Monmouth University	August 28–31, 2020	400 (RV)	± 4.9%	45%	40%	3% (Note: "No one" with 2%; Soloski (L) with 1%; Runkle (G) with 0%)	14%
Monmouth University	August 28–31, 2020	400 (LV)	± 4.9%	46% (Note: With a likely voter turnout model featuring higher turnout than in the 2016 presidential election)	41%	1%	12%
Monmouth University	August 28–31, 2020	400 (LV)	± 4.9%	45% (Note: With a likely voter turnout model featuring lower turnout than in the 2016 presidential election)	42%	0%	12%

=== Results ===
Pennsylvania State Treasurer election, 2020
Party	Candidate	Votes	%	±%
Republican	Stacy Garrity	3,291,877	48.68%	+4.47%
Democratic	Joe Torsella (incumbent)	3,239,331	47.91%	−2.75%
Libertarian	Joseph Soloski	148,614	2.20%	−0.05%
Green	Timothy Runkle	81,984	1.21%	−1.67%
Total votes		6,761,806	100.0%	
Republican gain from Democratic				

==== By county ====
County	Stacy Garrity Republican		Joesph Torsella Democratic		Various candidates Other parties	
County	#	%	#	%	#	%
Adams	37,087	66.60%	16,418	29.48%	2,180	3.92%
Allegheny	270,964	38.54%	404,138	57.49%	27,887	3.96%
Armstrong	25,875	72.07%	8,756	24.39%	1,271	3.24%
Beaver	51,292	55.13%	2,421	41.08%	3,527	3.79%
Bedford	22,272	81.96%	4,351	16.01%	550	2.02%
Berks	105,570	52.26%	88,616	43.87%	7,829	3.87%
Blair	44,464	70.59%	16,606	26.37%	1,915	3.04%
Bradford	22,175	75.00%	6,465	21.87%	926	3.14%
Bucks	187,154	47.97%	191,554	49.10%	11,415	2.92%
Butler	73,020	65.75%	34,148	30.75%	3,886	3.50%
Cambria	43,698	62.84%	23,946	34.43%	1,897	2.73%
Cameron	1,713	71.32%	611	25.44%	78	3.25%
Carbon	20,798	63.24%	11,037	33.56%	1,050	3.19%
Centre	36,303	47.59%	36,866	48.33%	3,114	4.08%
Chester	138,083	44.43%	163,147	52.50%	9,523	3.06%
Clarion	13,992	72.91%	4,570	23.81%	928	3.27%
Clearfield	27,576	70.91%	10,086	25.93%	1,228	3.16%
Clinton	11,379	65.33%	5,493	31.54%	546	3.13%
Columbia	18,126	58.95%	11,409	37.11%	1,212	3.94%
Crawford	27,299	66.34%	12,268	29.81%	1,583	3.84%
Cumberland	78,424	56.18%	55,652	39.87%	5,508	3.95%
Dauphin	65,729	45.59%	72,586	50.34%	5,666	4.06%
Delaware	124,401	38.62%	189,646	58.87%	8,093	2.51%
Elk	11,391	68.32%	4,730	28.37%	553	3.32%
Erie	62,029	46.66%	64,440	48.47%	6,471	4.86%
Fayette	37,111	61.64%	21,537	35.77%	1,561	2.59%
Forest	1,812	69.59%	699	26.84%	93	3.57%
Franklin	56,387	71.17%	20,123	25.40%	2,723	3.44%
Fulton	6,563	84.46%	1,044	13.43%	164	2.11%
Greene	11,101	64.97%	5,415	31.69%	570	3.34%
Huntingdon	16,603	74.01%	5,169	23.04%	660	2.94%
Indiana	26,431	65.02%	12,850	31.61%	1,372	2.37%
Jefferson	17,587	77.00%	4,555	19.94%	697	3.05%
Juniata	9,235	78.36%	2,236	18.97%	314	2.66%
Lackawanna	46,677	41.79%	61,104	54.71%	3,911	3.51%
Lancaster	163,477	59.48%	101,861	37.06%	9,521	3.27%
Lawrence	26,984	59.90%	16,634	36.92%	1,434	3.18%
Lebanon	45,942	65.42%	21,668	30.86%	2,615	3.72%
Lehigh	82,222	45.56%	91,616	50.77%	6,630	3.68%
Luzerne	77,304	52.22%	65,889	44.51%	4,829	3.26%
Lycoming	40,665	69.58%	15,951	27.29%	1,825	3.13%
McKean	13,921	72.88%	4,543	23.79%	636	3.33%
Mercer	34,913	61.47%	19,940	35.11%	1,945	3.42%
Mifflin	16,065	76.11%	4,371	20.71%	671	3.18%
Monroe	36,083	45.50%	41,036	50.73%	3,055	3.77%
Montgomery	189,613	37.70%	297,179	59.08%	16,225	3.22%
Montour	5,717	59.34%	3,561	36.96%	357	3.70%
Northampton	79,907	48.43%	79,191	47.99%	5,909	3.58%
Northumberland	27,664	66.58%	12,282	29.56%	1,605	3.87%
Perry	17,928	73.78%	5,444	22.40%	928	3.82%
Philadelphia	122,763	17.41%	561,438	79.61%	20,992	2.97%
Pike	18,973	59.26%	11,965	37.37%	1,070	3.37%
Potter	7,165	80.63%	1,498	16.86%	223	2.51%
Schuylkill	46,088	66.32%	20,685	29.77%	2,720	3.92%
Snyder	13,737	73.14%	4,416	23.51%	630	3.35%
Somerset	30,050	74.89%	9,046	22.54%	1,029	2.57%
Sullivan	2,522	71.69%	883	25.10%	113	3.21%
Susquehanna	14,957	69.90%	5,704	26.66%	738	3.45%
Tioga	15,661	75.69%	4,255	20.56%	776	3.75%
Union	12,451	62.62%	6,769	34.04%	663	3.34%
Venango	18,001	69.07%	7,033	26.98%	1,029	3.95%
Warren	13,599	67.41%	5,682	28.17%	892	4.43%
Washington	68,257	58.51%	44,477	38.12%	3,928	3.36%
Wayne	18,233	66.40%	8,363	30.46%	864	3.14%
Westmoreland	123,694	61.30%	71,908	35.64%	6,173	3.06%
Wyoming	9,751	67.17%	4,270	29.41%	496	3.41%
York	146,529	62.33%	79,288	33.73%	9,266	3.94%
Totals	3,291,877	48.68%	3,239,331	47.91%	230,598	3.41%

Counties that flipped from Democratic to Republican

- Beaver (largest city: Beaver)
- Luzerne (largest city: Wilkes-Barre)
- Northampton (largest municipality: Bethlehem)

==== By congressional district ====
Garrity and Torsella each won nine of 18 congressional districts. Each candidate won a district that elected a representative of the other party.

District	Torsella	Garrity	Representative
1st	50%	47%	Brian Fitzpatrick
2nd	70%	27%	Brendan Boyle
3rd	88%	9%	Dwight Evans
4th	58%	39%	Madeleine Dean
5th	62%	36%	Mary Gay Scanlon
6th	52%	44%	Chrissy Houlahan
7th	50%	47%	Susan Wild
8th	48%	49%	Matt Cartwright
9th	34%	62%	Dan Meuser
10th	44%	52%	Scott Perry
11th	34%	62%	Lloyd Smucker
12th	29%	68%	Fred Keller
13th	26%	71%	John Joyce
14th	37%	60%	Guy Reschenthaler
15th	28%	69%	Glenn Thompson
16th	39%	57%	Mike Kelly
17th	49%	48%	Conor Lamb
18th	63%	33%	Mike Doyle

== See also ==
- 2020 Pennsylvania elections
- Elections in Pennsylvania
