= 2016 Pennsylvania State Treasurer election =

- November 8, 2016
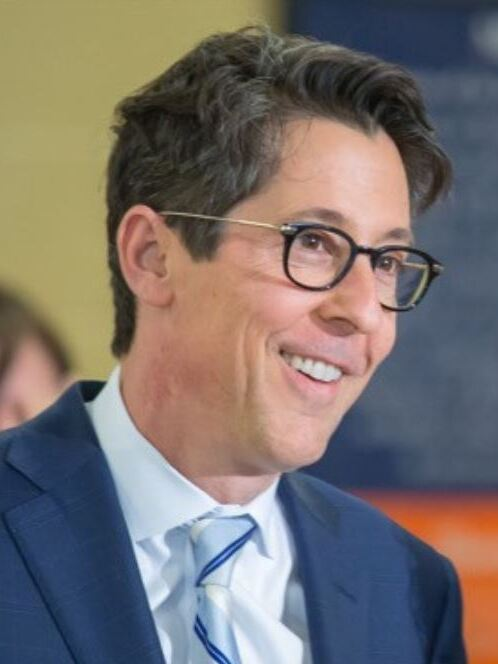

Nominee	Joe Torsella	Otto Voit III
Party	Democratic	Republican
Popular vote	2,991,404	2,610,811
Percentage	50.66%	44.21%
- Torsella: 40–50% 50–60% 60–70% 70–80% 80–90% >90% Voit: 40–50% 50–60% 60–70% 70–80% 80–90% >90% Tie: 40–50% 50% No votes
Treasurer before election
Tim Reese
Independent
Elected Treasurer
Joe Torsella
Democratic

The Pennsylvania Treasurer election of 2016 was held on November 8, 2016. Incumbent Tim Reese was eligible to run, but decided not to. The Democratic and Republican primary election was held on April 26, 2016, with each candidate running unopposed in their respective primaries. Four candidates would appear on the ballot: Democrat Joe Torsella, Republican Otto Voit, Libertarian James Babb, and Green Party candidate Kristen Combs. Torsella defeated Voit by a 6.45% margin, with Babb and Combs both receiving under 3% of the vote.

== Democratic primary ==
=== Candidates ===
- Joe Torsella, former United States Ambassador to the United Nations for Management and Reform (2011–2014) and former Pennsylvania Secretary of Education (2008–2011)

=== Results ===
Democratic primary results
Party	Candidate	Votes	%
Democratic	Joe Torsella	1,300,295	100.0%
Total votes		1,300,295	100.0%

== Republican primary ==
=== Candidates ===
- Otto Voit III, vice-president of the Muhlenberg School District board

=== Results ===
Republican primary results
Party	Candidate	Votes	%
Republican	Otto W. Voit III	1,191,619	100.0%
Total votes		1,191,619	100.0%

== General election ==
=== Results ===
2016 Pennsylvania State Treasurer election
Party	Candidate	Votes	%	±%
Democratic	Joe Torsella	2,991,404	50.66%	−1.87%
Republican	Otto Voit III	2,610,811	44.21%	+0.22%
Green	Kristin Combs	170,275	2.88%	N/A
Libertarian	James Babb	132,654	2.25%	−1.23%
Total votes		5,905,144	100.0%	N/A
Democratic hold				
