= Thomas Tiberi =

American politician

Thomas J. Tiberi

Member of the Pennsylvania House of Representatives from the 11th district
- In office January 7, 1969 – November 30, 1970
- Preceded by: District Created
- Succeeded by: Jack Arthurs

Member of the Pennsylvania House of Representatives from the Allegheny County district
- In office January 5, 1965 – November 30, 1968

Personal details
- Born: April 10, 1919 Butler, Pennsylvania
- Died: November 14, 1995 (aged 76) Butler, Pennsylvania
- Party: Democratic

Thomas J. Tiberi (April 10, 1919 – November 14, 1995) was a Democratic member of the Pennsylvania House of Representatives.
