= Jack Arthurs =

American politician (1922–2020)

Jack R. Arthurs

Member of the Pennsylvania House of Representatives from the 11th district
- In office 1971–1978
- Preceded by: Thomas Tiberi
- Succeeded by: Joseph Steighner

Personal details
- Born: July 10, 1922 Brookville, Pennsylvania, U.S.
- Died: December 28, 2020 (aged 98) Butler, Pennsylvania, U.S.
- Party: Democratic

Jack R. Arthurs (July 10, 1922 – December 28, 2020) was an American politician who served as a member of the Pennsylvania House of Representatives from 1971 to 1978 as a member of the Democratic Party. Arthurs was born in Brookville, Pennsylvania. Arthurs served in the United States Navy. He worked in public relations for the telephone company. He died in December 2020 at the age of 98.
