= 2024 Pennsylvania State Treasurer election =

- November 5, 2024
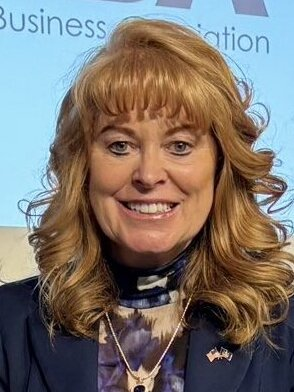

Nominee	Stacy Garrity	Erin McClelland
Party	Republican	Democratic
Popular vote	3,542,336	3,115,393
Percentage	51.91%	45.65%
- Garrity: 40–50% 50–60% 60–70% 70–80% 80–90% McClelland: 40–50% 50–60% 60–70% 70–80% 80–90%
State Treasurer before election
Stacy Garrity
Republican
Elected State Treasurer
Stacy Garrity
Republican

The 2024 State Treasurer in Pennsylvania was held on November 5, 2024, to elect the Pennsylvania state treasurer. Incumbent Republican treasurer Stacy Garrity was re-elected to a second term in office, defeating Democratic candidate Erin McClelland and outperforming (percentage wise) all other 2024 Republican statewide nominees in Pennsylvania.

Garrity became the first Republican treasurer to win re-election since Barbara Hafer in 2000. Her win set the record for the most votes cast for any candidate in commonwealth history. She carried Centre, Dauphin, and Lehigh counties, all of which Kamala Harris carried in the concurrent presidential election. This was the first Treasurer election to hold a contested primary for either major party since 1992.

== Republican primary ==
=== Candidates ===
==== Nominee ====
- Stacy Garrity, incumbent state treasurer (2021–present)

=== Endorsements ===
Stacy Garrity

Political parties

- Pennsylvania Republican Party

=== Results ===
Republican primary results
Party	Candidate	Votes	%
Republican	Stacy Garrity (incumbent)	Unopposed	
Total votes		853,284	100.0%

== Democratic primary ==
=== Candidates ===
==== Nominee ====
- Erin McClelland, psychologist, nominee for Pennsylvania's 12th congressional district in 2014 and 2016, and candidate for Allegheny County Executive in 2023

==== Eliminated in primary ====
- Ryan Bizzarro, state representative from the 3rd district (2013–present)

==== Withdrawn ====
- Alan Butkovitz, former Philadelphia City Controller (2006–2018) and former state representative for the 174th district (1991–2005)

=== Endorsements ===
Ryan Bizzarro

Statewide officials

- Ed Rendell, Governor of Pennsylvania (2003–2011)
- Joe Torsella, Pennsylvania Treasurer (2017–2021)

U.S. Representatives

- Matt Cartwright, PA-8 (2013–present)
- Madeleine Dean, PA-4 (2019–present)
- Dwight Evans, PA-3 (2016–present)
- Mary Gay Scanlon, PA-5 (2018–present)
- Susan Wild, PA-7 (2018–present)
- Conor Lamb, PA-17 (2018–2023)

State legislators

- Jay Costa, Minority Leader of the Pennsylvania State Senate (2011–present) from the 43rd district (1996–present)
- Jimmy Dillon, state senator from the 5th district (2022–present)
- Marty Flynn, state senator from the 22nd district (2021–present)
- Katie Muth, state senator from the 44th district (2019–present)
- 73 state representatives

Local officials

- Rich Fitzgerald, Allegheny County Executive (2012–2024)
- Ed Gainey, Mayor of Pittsburgh (2022–present)
- Corey O'Connor, Allegheny County Controller (2022–present)
- Joe Schember, Mayor of Erie (2018–present)
- Matthew Tuerk, Mayor of Allentown (2022–present)

Party officials

- Marcel Groen, chair of the Pennsylvania Democratic Party (2015–2018)

Political parties

- Pennsylvania Democratic Party
Alan Butkovitz (withdrawn)

U.S. Representatives

- Bob Brady, PA-1 (1998–2019)

=== Results ===
Results by county: McClelland: 70–80%; 60–70%; 50–60%; Bizzarro: 50–60%; 60–70%; 70–80%; 80–90%

Democratic primary results
Party	Candidate	Votes	%
Democratic	Erin McClelland	547,345	54.23%
Democratic	Ryan Bizzarro	461,905	45.77%
Total votes		1,009,250	100.00%

== Third-party candidates ==
=== Constitution Party ===
==== Nominee ====
- Troy Bowman, treasurer of the Pennsylvania Constitution Party

=== Forward Party ===
==== Nominee ====
- Chris Foster, real estate sales associate

=== Libertarian convention ===
==== Nominee ====
- Nick Ciesielski, engineer

== General election ==
=== Polling ===
Poll source	Date(s) administered	Sample size (Note: Key: A – all adults RV – registered voters LV – likely voters V – unclear)	Margin of error	Stacy Garrity (R)	Erin McClelland (D)	Other	Undecided
ActiVote	October 4–25, 2024	400 (LV)	± 4.9%	50.5%	49.5%	–	–
ActiVote	September 6 – October 7, 2024	400 (LV)	± 4.9%	51%	49%	–	–
Fabrizio Ward (R)/ Impact Research (D) (Note: Poll commissioned by the AARP)	September 17–24, 2024	1,398 (LV)	–	45%	44%	–	11%
ActiVote	July 26 – August 23, 2024	400 (LV)	± 4.9%	46%	54%	–	–
Commonwealth Foundation	June 14–19, 2024	800 (RV)	± 3.46%	41%	44%	5%	10%

=== Post-primary endorsements ===
Stacy Garrity (R)

Labor unions

- Fraternal Order of Police Pennsylvania State Lodge
- International Brotherhood of Electrical Workers Local 98
- IUPAT District Councils 21, 27
- Laborers' Pennsylvania District Council
- Pennsylvania State Troopers Association
- Philadelphia Building Trades Council
- Philadelphia Firefighters IAFF Local 22
- Pittsburgh Firefighters IAFF Local 1
Erin McClelland (D)

Organizations

- Planned Parenthood Pennsylvania PAC

Labor unions

- Pennsylvania AFL-CIO
- AFSCME District Councils 13, 47
- Pennsylvania State Education Association
- United Steelworkers District 10

Political parties

- Pennsylvania Democratic Party
Chris Foster (F)

Individuals

- Andrew Yang, entrepreneur and Democratic candidate for President of the United States in 2020
Declined to endorse

Statewide officials

- Josh Shapiro, governor of Pennsylvania (2023–present) (Democratic)

=== Results ===
2024 Pennsylvania State Treasurer election
Party	Candidate	Votes	%	±%
Republican	Stacy Garrity (incumbent)	3,542,336	51.91%	+3.23%
Democratic	Erin McClelland	3,115,393	45.65%	−2.26%
Libertarian	Nick Ciesielski	99,228	1.45%	−0.75%
Constitution	Troy Bowman	40,886	0.60%	N/A
Forward	Chris Foster	26,753	0.39%	N/A
Total votes		6,824,596	100.00%	

==== By county ====
County	Stacy Garrity Republican		Erin McClelland Democratic		Various candidates Other parties	
County	#	%	#	%	#	%
Adams	40,314	68.22%	17,175	29.06%	1,608	2.73%
Allegheny	284,446	40.67%	395,886	56.60%	19,151	2.73%
Armstrong	27,092	74.81%	8,122	22.43%	1,002	2.77%
Beaver	55,109	58.99%	35,664	38.18%	2,643	2.83%
Bedford	22,727	83.26%	4,025	14.75%	545	2.00%
Berks	110,717	55.89%	81,798	41.29%	5,599	2.83%
Blair	45,627	71.95%	16,257	25.64%	1,528	2.41%
Bradford	23,993	78.24%	5,996	19.55%	675	2.20%
Bucks	204,612	52.15%	179,233	45.68%	8,493	2.17%
Butler	80,317	67.60%	35,526	29.90%	2,966	2.50%
Cambria	46,569	66.74%	21,428	30.71%	1,776	2.55%
Cameron	1,652	75.57%	468	21.41%	66	3.01%
Carbon	22,619	66.60%	10,390	30.59%	953	2.80%
Centre	39,819	50.51%	37,125	47.09%	1,887	2.40%
Chester	148,699	46.41%	164,900	51.47%	6,784	2.11%
Clarion	14,460	76.25%	4,023	21.21%	481	2.54%
Clearfield	29,248	74.21%	9,139	23.19%	1,027	2.61%
Clinton	12,808	70.59%	4,919	27.11%	418	2.30%
Columbia	21,131	66.27%	9,811	30.77%	946	2.96%
Crawford	29,254	69.51%	11,744	27.90%	1,088	2.58%
Cumberland	84,582	58.04%	57,300	39.32%	3,847	2.64%
Dauphin	72,581	49.79%	68,730	47.15%	4,464	3.06%
Delaware	131,515	40.87%	184,055	57.20%	6,215	1.93%
Elk	12,199	72.11%	4,303	25.44%	415	2.45%
Erie	68,312	50.91%	62,048	46.24%	3,822	2.85%
Fayette	40,394	66.58%	18,878	31.12%	1,397	2.30%
Forest	1,907	73.35%	628	24.15%	65	2.50%
Franklin	59,212	72.13%	20,559	25.04%	2,318	2.82%
Fulton	6,781	84.79%	1,028	12.85%	188	2.35%
Greene	11,743	69.80%	4,662	27.71%	419	2.49%
Huntingdon	17,365	76.22%	4,853	21.30%	564	2.47%
Indiana	28,176	68.57%	11,857	28.86%	1,057	2.58%
Jefferson	17,634	77.97%	4,398	19.45%	583	2.58%
Juniata	9,655	82.04%	1,859	15.80%	255	2.17%
Lackawanna	52,049	46.93%	55,932	50.43%	2,931	2.65%
Lancaster	172,048	60.50%	105,136	36.97%	7,200	2.53%
Lawrence	29,980	64.99%	14,874	32.24%	1,275	2.77%
Lebanon	49,066	67.95%	21,136	29.27%	2,005	2.78%
Lehigh	89,657	49.02%	88,241	48.25%	4,987	2.73%
Luzerne	88,753	58.56%	59,043	38.95%	3,776	2.50%
Lycoming	41,992	71.64%	15,107	25.77%	1,513	2.58%
McKean	14,309	73.19%	4,552	23.51%	498	2.57%
Mercer	36,824	64.33%	18,909	33.03%	1,512	2.64%
Mifflin	17,034	78.54%	4,142	19.10%	513	2.37%
Monroe	41,405	49.70%	39,517	47.44%	2,383	2.86%
Montgomery	211,690	41.31%	289,943	56.58%	10,790	2.10%
Montour	6,153	63.62%	3,271	33.82%	247	2.56%
Northampton	87,952	51.40%	79,690	46.57%	3,473	2.03%
Northumberland	29,946	70.20%	11,478	26.91%	1,235	2.90%
Perry	19,284	76.38%	5,259	20.83%	703	2.79%
Philadelphia	133,516	19.95%	523,136	78.15%	12,708	1.89%
Pike	21,060	61.82%	12,148	35.66%	857	2.51%
Potter	7,253	81.25%	1,462	16.38%	212	2.38%
Schuylkill	50,406	70.11%	19,323	26.88%	2,169	3.02%
Snyder	14,703	74.79%	4,446	22.62%	510	2.59%
Somerset	31,071	77.35%	8,167	20.33%	930	2.32%
Sullivan	2,729	75.30%	799	22.05%	96	2.65%
Susquehanna	16,050	72.94%	5,327	24.21%	627	2.85%
Tioga	16,273	76.60%	4,400	20.71%	570	2.68%
Union	13,391	64.32%	6,963	33.45%	464	2.23%
Venango	18,676	70.83%	6,922	26.25%	768	2.91%
Warren	14,176	69.45%	5,574	27.31%	661	3.31%
Washington	73,974	62.38%	41,673	35.14%	2,935	2.47%
Wayne	19,907	69.33%	8,088	28.17%	719	2.51%
Westmoreland	131,023	64.03%	68,258	33.36%	5,355	2.62%
Wyoming	10,375	70.09%	4,083	27.58%	344	2.32%
York	156,339	64.44%	79,607	32.81%	6,656	2.74%
Totals	3,542,336	51.91%	3,115,393	45.65%	166,867	2.44%

Counties that flipped from Democratic to Republican

- Bucks (largest city: Bensalem)
- Centre (largest city: State College)
- Erie (largest city: Erie)
- Lehigh (largest city: Allentown)
- Monroe (largest city: East Stroudsburg)
- Dauphin (largest city: Harrisburg)

==== By congressional district ====
Garrity won ten of 17 congressional districts.

District	Garrity	McClelland	Representative
1st	52%	46%	Brian Fitzpatrick
2nd	31%	67%	Brendan Boyle
3rd	12%	87%	Dwight Evans
4th	44%	54%	Madeleine Dean
5th	38%	60%	Mary Gay Scanlon
6th	47%	51%	Chrissy Houlahan
7th	52%	46%	Susan Wild (118th Congress)
7th	52%	46%	Ryan Mackenzie (119th Congress)
8th	53%	44%	Matt Cartwright (118th Congress)
8th	53%	44%	Rob Bresnahan (119th Congress)
9th	70%	27%	Dan Meuser
10th	55%	42%	Scott Perry
11th	63%	35%	Lloyd Smucker
12th	41%	57%	Summer Lee
13th	73%	25%	John Joyce
14th	66%	32%	Guy Reschenthaler
15th	69%	28%	Glenn Thompson
16th	62%	36%	Mike Kelly
17th	48%	49%	Chris Deluzio

== See also ==
- 2024 Pennsylvania elections

== Notes ==
Partisan clients
