= Guy Travaglio =

American politician (1926–2019)

Member of the Pennsylvania House of Representatives from the 11th district
- In office January 3, 1995 – November 30, 2004
- Preceded by: Joseph A. Steighner
- Succeeded by: Brian L. Ellis

Personal details
- Born: July 24, 1926 Ambridge, Pennsylvania, U.S.
- Died: September 7, 2019 (aged 93) Butler, Pennsylvania, U.S.
- Party: Democratic
- Spouse(s): Norma Jean Bartoe (d. 1965); Bonita Ruth

Military service
- Allegiance: United States
- Branch/service: United States Military
- Years of service: 1945-1947

Guy A. Travaglio, Jr. (July 24, 1926 – September 7, 2019) was a Democratic member of the Pennsylvania House of Representatives.

== Formative years and family ==
Travaglio graduated from Butler Area High School in 1945. He served in the U.S. military in Okinawa, Japan from 1945 to 1947. Travaglio then attended Slippery Rock College and Butler Business School.

Following college, he worked the office supply business from 1952 to 1958.

Travaglio married Norma Jean Bartoe in 1947 and the couple had five children before she was killed in a 1965 car accident. He later married Bonita Ruth Ross and they had one child. As of 2004, Travaglio had thirteen grandchildren and twelve great grandchildren.

== Career ==
Throughout his life, Travaglio was part owner of several business ventures, including Mr. Q's Record Shop from 1958 to 1962, a car wash from 1967 to 1976, and the Record Rack from 1968 to 1970.

Travaglio served on the Butler City Council from 1966 to 1970. He was also involved in Butler-area radio stations as an on-air personality, management, and part owner. He retired as general manager of WISR in 1993.

He was first elected to represent the 11th legislative district in the Pennsylvania House of Representatives in 1994. He retired prior to the 2004 elections.

== Death ==
Travaglio died in Butler on September 7, 2019.
