= Joseph Steighner =

American politician

Joseph A. Steighner

Member of the Pennsylvania House of Representatives from the 11th district
- In office 1979 – November 30, 1994
- Preceded by: Jack Arthurs
- Succeeded by: Guy Travaglio

Personal details
- Born: September 28, 1950 New Castle, Pennsylvania
- Died: August 11, 2020 (aged 69) Butler County, Pennsylvania
- Party: Democratic

Joseph Alan Steighner (September 28, 1950 – August 11, 2020) was a Democratic member of the Pennsylvania House of Representatives.

== Career ==
In 1978, Steighner was elected to represent Pennsylvania's 11th District in the Pennsylvania House of Representatives.

During his time in office, Steighner served as the Chairman of the House Games and Fisheries Committee, and sat as a member of the House Conservation Committee.

Following his retirement from the House on November 30, 1994, he became a lobbyist for several groups, including Gaming World International Ltd., which sought to begin riverboat gambling if the correct laws were passed. Other groups included Harrisburg law firm Balaban and Balaban, the Delta Development Corporation, and the Fraternal Congress. Under the state's Ethics Law, he was permitted to lobby members of the Pennsylvania State Senate immediately upon retirement, and permitted to lobby House members after a year.

== Personal life ==
Steighner had two children: a son (Christopher) and a daughter (Bethann).

Steighner died on August 11, 2020, at his residence in Butler County, Pennsylvania at the age of 69.
