= Sayre Area School District =

School district in Pennsylvania

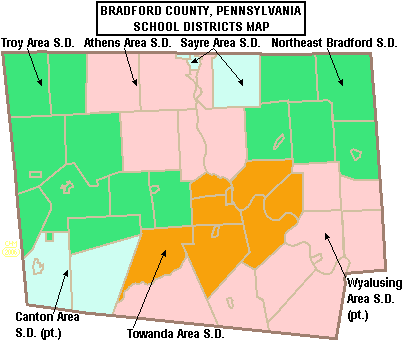

Address
- 333 West Lockhart Street Sayre, Bradford County, Pennsylvania, 18840; United States

District information
- Established: February 28, 1882

Students and staff
- Students: 958 (2021–2022)
- Faculty: 65.10 (2021–2022)
- District mascot: Redskins
- Colors: Red and blue

Other information
- Website: www.sayresd.org

The Sayre Area School District is a small, rural public school district located in northcentral Bradford County, Pennsylvania. It is one of the 500 public school districts of Pennsylvania. The district serves two noncontiguous fragments: the Boroughs of Sayre and South Waverly and Litchfield Township in Bradford County, Pennsylvania. The district encompasses approximately 33 square miles (85 km^{2}) and, as of school year 2021–2022, provides basic educational services to 958 pupils and employs 65.10 full-time equivalent faculty.

Sayre Area School District operates two schools: Sayre Area High School (7th-12th) and H. Austin Snyder Elementary School (pre K–6th). Litchfield Elementary School (K-4th) was closed in June 2011.

== History ==
The present high school building was erected in 1928 and 1929 with additions and remodeling completed in the late 1960s and early 1970s. The community gave its swimming pool to the Sayre Area School District in 1951. The first high school building was actually constructed in 1891 and 1892 and renovated with an annex in 1897. It was a recreation center and later became a 4-6 elementary school.

Litchfield Elementary School was built in 1967. The school was temporarily closed by the board in June 2011. In 2019, the school board voted 7 to 1 to permanently close the Litchfield Elementary School, which includes the school building as well as 91 acres (37 ha) of land.

Sayre Area School District teachers went on strike on April 12, 2016, adversely impacting the time period for the state testing of students. They were ordered by the Pennsylvania Department of Education to return to work on April 22 of the same year. Sayre teachers had been working without a contract for three years at the time of the strike.

== Demographics and staffing ==
According to 2010 federal census data, the district served a resident population of 7,938 people. By 2019, the district's population was 7,761 people. The educational attainment levels for the Sayre Area School District population (25 years old and over) in 2019 were 88.9% high school graduates and 21.6% college graduates.

According to 2019 American Community Survey, 24% of the district's children lived at or below the Federal Poverty Level. In 2019, the district residents' per capita income was $29,597, while the median household income was $50,163. In the Commonwealth, the median household income was $63,463. In Bradford County, the median household income was $52,358.

The district employed 85 teachers, 61 full-time and part-time support personnel, and nine administrators during the 2011–12 school year, receiving $8,101,154 in state funding. In school year 2021–2022 it provided basic educational services to 958 pupils and employed 65.10 full-time equivalent faculty.

== Coursework, services and extracurriculars ==
High school students may choose to attend the Northern Tier Career Center for training in: food service, cosmetology; practical nursing; technology; auto mechanics; as well as construction and electric trades. The BLaST Intermediate Unit IU17 provides the district with a wide variety of services like: specialized education for disabled students; state mandated training on recognizing and reporting child abuse; speech and visual disability services; criminal background check processing for prospective employees and professional development for staff and faculty.

The district offers a wide variety of clubs, activities and an extensive, publicly funded sports program. It operates an indoor pool and fields the following:

Varsity

Boys

- Baseball - A
- Basketball - AA
- Cross country running - A
- Football - A
- Golf - AA
- Soccer - (Operated jointly with Athens Area School District)
- Swimming and diving - (Operated jointly with Athens Area School District)
- Track and field - AA
- Wrestling - AA

Girls

- Basketball - AA
- Cheer - AAAA
- Cross country - AA
- Soccer - (Operated jointly with Athens Area School District)
- Softball - A
- Swimming and diving - (Operated jointly with Athens Area School District)
- Track and field - AA
- Volleyball - A

Junior high middle school sports

Boys

- Basketball
- Cross country
- Football
- Soccer
- Track and field
- Wrestling

Girls

- Basketball
- Cheer
- Cross country
- Track and field
- Volleyball
