= Joe Torsella =

American politician (born 1963)

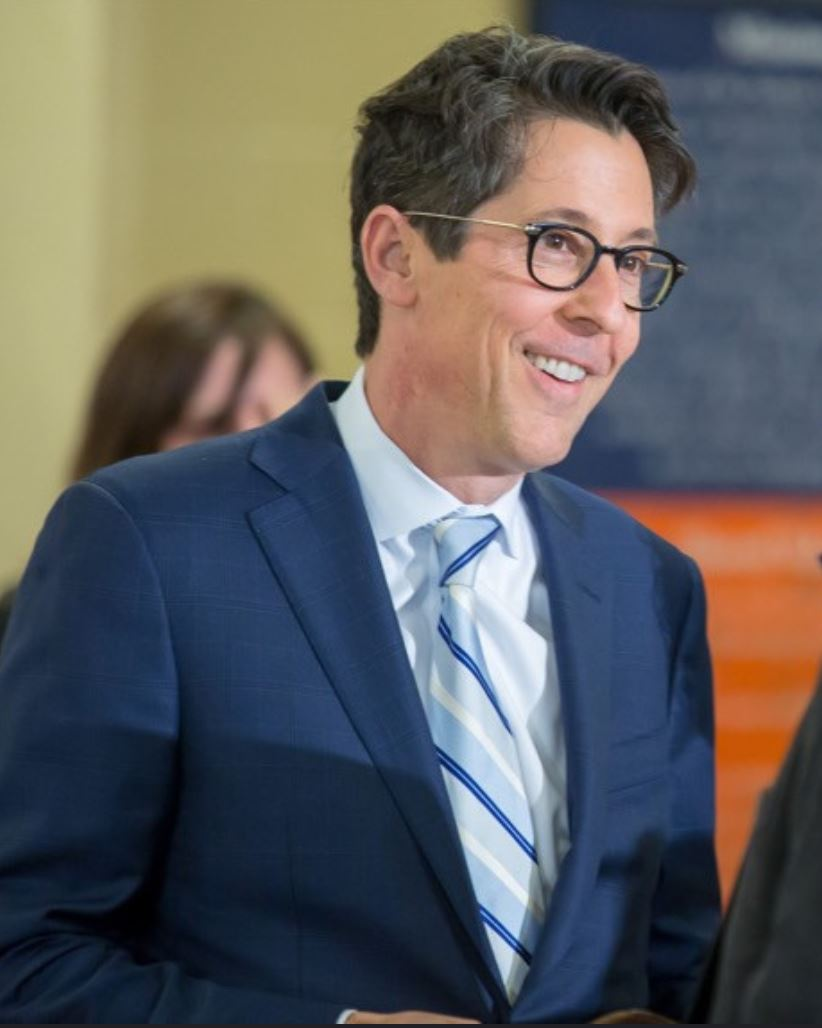
- Torsella in 2018

78th Treasurer of Pennsylvania
- In office January 17, 2017 – January 19, 2021
- Governor: Tom Wolf
- Preceded by: Tim Reese
- Succeeded by: Stacy Garrity

United States Ambassador to the United Nations for Management and Reform
- In office April 26, 2011 – December 19, 2014
- President: Barack Obama
- Preceded by: Joseph Melrose (acting)
- Succeeded by: Isobel Coleman

Secretary of Education of Pennsylvania
- In office August 13, 2008 – January 18, 2011
- Governor: Ed Rendell
- Preceded by: Karl Girton
- Succeeded by: Larry Wittig

Chair and CEO of the National Constitution Center
- In office June 1, 2006 – January 1, 2009
- Preceded by: Rick Stengel
- Succeeded by: Linda Johnson (acting)
- In office January 29, 1997 – December 31, 2003
- Preceded by: Robert Brasler
- Succeeded by: Rick Stengel

Personal details
- Born: October 8, 1963 (age 62) Berwick, Pennsylvania, U.S.
- Party: Democratic
- Spouse: Carolyn Short
- Children: 4
- Education: University of Pennsylvania (BA); New College, Oxford

Joseph M. Torsella (born October 8, 1963) is an American politician and former diplomat, who served as the Pennsylvania treasurer from 2017 to 2021. He is a member of the Democratic Party. Torsella was the U.S. representative to the United Nations for Management and Reform (with the rank of ambassador) from 2011 to 2014. He previously was president and CEO of the National Constitution Center in Philadelphia from 1997 to 2003 and again from 2006 to 2008. He was the chairman of the Pennsylvania State Board of Education from 2008 through 2011. Torsella was elected as Pennsylvania Treasurer in 2016, losing re-election in 2020 to Republican Stacy Garrity.

== Education ==
After graduating from Wyoming Seminary, Torsella earned a Bachelor of Arts degree in economics and history from the University of Pennsylvania, graduating Phi Beta Kappa in 1986. As a Rhodes Scholar (1986–1990), he did graduate work in American history at New College, Oxford.

== Early career ==
Torsella served as Philadelphia's Deputy Mayor for Policy and Planning for Mayor Ed Rendell (later Governor of Pennsylvania) from January 1992 to September 1993. He was not yet 30. Under Rendell, Torsella developed and implemented financial and labor reforms that led the city toward a fiscal rebound that the New York Times called "one of the most stunning turnarounds in recent urban history". The municipal renaissance was chronicled in journalist Buzz Bissinger's book A Prayer for the City, in which Torsella describes the Rendell administration's philosophy as "taking control of the government and restructuring it for effectiveness".

=== National Constitution Center (1997–2003) ===
In 1988, the United States Congress passed and President Ronald Reagan signed the Constitution Heritage Act calling for the creation of a National Constitution Center to "disseminate information about the United States Constitution on a non-partisan basis in order to increase the awareness and understanding of the Constitution among the American people". The non-profit museum and education center was to be located in Philadelphia. But for almost a decade the project languished, financially troubled and inadequately focused.

By 1997, the Constitution Center was still not built and already had an operating deficit of $200,000 (Philadelphia Business Journal, January 3, 2003). That year, Philadelphia Mayor Ed Rendell asked Torsella to become President and CEO. Torsella raised $185 million in private and public funds, formed a board of trustees led by Vanguard Group founder John C. Bogle and got the project back on track. The National Constitution Center opened on July 4, 2003, in a modern glass-fronted 160,000-square-foot (15,000 m^{2}) structure (designed by Henry H. Cobb of Pei Cobb Freed & Partners) located on the north end of Independence Mall.

=== Olympic bid (2005) ===
In 2005, Torsella co-chaired the city of Philadelphia's bid for the 2016 Olympic Games, along with David L. Cohen, executive vice president of Comcast Corp, and Olympic gold medalist Dawn Staley. Chicago was ultimately selected as the U.S. Olympic bid city, but Torsella continued to serve as co-chairman of the Philadelphia Olympic and International Sports Project the successor organization to Philadelphia 2016 that attracted two Olympic team trial events, table tennis and gymnastics.

=== Return to the National Constitution Center (2006) ===
Torsella returned as President and CEO of the National Constitution Center in 2006, after his successor, Richard Stengel, left to become managing editor of Time magazine. Under Torsella's leadership, the Center became the permanent home of the annual Liberty Medal ceremony. The medal was presented in 2006 to former Presidents George H. W. Bush and Bill Clinton for their humanitarian work following Hurricane Katrina and the tsunami in Southeast Asia. In 2007, it went to Bono and DATA, the advocacy organization Bono co-founded for raising awareness about AIDS and extreme poverty in Africa. In 2008, the medal was presented to Mikhail Gorbachev to mark the 20th anniversary of the fall of the Berlin Wall.

In 2007, Torsella personally persuaded former President George H. W. Bush to serve as Chairman of the Board of Trustees, the only active board position President Bush then held. In 2008, Torsella announced that former President Bill Clinton would replace Bush as chairman as of January 1, 2009.

The Constitution Center also hosted key events during the 2008 presidential race. On March 18, 2008, then-Senator Barack Obama delivered his much-heralded speech on race relations in America at the Constitution Center, one that historians Garry Wills and Harold Holzer have compared to Abraham Lincoln's famous Cooper Union address. On April 16, 2008, the National Constitution Center hosted a Democratic presidential primary debate between Senators Obama and Hillary Clinton, the last and highest rated debate of the primary season. That evening, Torsella's appearance on The Colbert Report aired on Comedy Central, in a segment awarded "Best TV Performance" in Philadelphia Magazine's 2008 Best of Philly issue.

In 2008, on the 60th anniversary of the Universal Declaration of Human Rights, the Constitution Center launched an International Engagement Program to promote constitutional principles in emerging democracies by using the civic learning and educational initiatives it developed at the Constitution Center. The Program sought to bolster civil society in Afghanistan through partnerships with the Ministry of Education, the Marefet School and non-governmental organizations. The Constitution Center supported Nasim Fekrat, Afghanistan's leading blogger, to strengthen citizen journalism in the country. In addition, the Constitution Center provided Afghan students with digital cameras and camcorders to capture the sights and sounds of freedom, religious expression and other civic themes as part of its Being "We the People" exhibit project, which opened at the Constitution Center on August 24, 2009.

On December 11, 2008, Torsella announced that he would be stepping down as President and CEO of the Constitution Center at the end of January 2009. The Philadelphia Inquirer described his tenure as a "resounding success" and called him a "modern-day founding father".

=== Other political runs ===
In 2004, Torsella ran for a seat in the U.S. Congress in Pennsylvania's 13th congressional district. Torsella received endorsements from the region's major newspapers, including the Philadelphia Inquirer, but was outspent by close to $1 million, and lost in a close Democratic Party primary to Allyson Schwartz.

In 2009, Torsella announced his candidacy for the Democratic nomination in the 2010 U.S. Senate race in Pennsylvania. Torsella withdrew from the race after incumbent Senator Arlen Specter switched party affiliations from Republican to Democrat, citing a desire to avoid a potentially negative primary fight that would weaken Democratic chances in the November 2010 general election.

In 2016, Torsella was elected as Pennsylvania State Treasurer, beating Republican Otto Voit of Berks County. As Treasurer, Torsella is responsible for overseeing more than $100 billion in public assets, but his bigger challenge comes with changing the public perception. The position of treasurer was previously held by Timothy A. Reese, who was nominated and confirmed in June 2015 following the resignation of Rob McCord.

=== Chairman of the Pennsylvania State Board of Education ===
On August 13, 2008, Governor Edward G. Rendell named Torsella the Chairman of the Pennsylvania State Board of Education.

Under Torsella's leadership, the State Board passed a landmark reform strengthening high school graduation requirements on August 13, 2009; the reform requires students to demonstrate proficiency in core subjects such as math, science, English and social studies prior to receiving a diploma. When an earlier proposal for graduation testing ran into heavy opposition from statewide education groups and was reversed by the legislature, Torsella brokered a compromise initiative that was approved by the state's Independent Regulatory Review Commission on October 22, 2009, and took effect beginning with the 2010–2011 school year.

The Board partnered with Pennsylvania's Department of Education to develop an application for the federal government's Race to the Top initiative, an incentive program designed to spur reform in K-12 education across the country. In the first-round selection, Pennsylvania was seventh out of forty-one applicant states and submitted a second round application on June 1, 2010. To support that application, the Board expedited its review and adopted "Common Core" academic standards in math and English language arts.

In other initiatives, the Board initiated reviews to improve school safety, held more than half of its meetings outside Harrisburg and urged a variety of measures to make college more accessible and affordable, including the creation of a "no frills" option in higher education. More recently, the Board advanced new regulations on school nutrition and physical activity to reduce childhood obesity, a response that has been called "the most comprehensive such standards in the nation."

On June 10, 2010, Governor Rendell tapped Torsella to lead Pennsylvania's participation in Complete College America, a 22-state effort to significantly increase college completion and accessibility by 2020.

=== Ambassador ===
On November 15, 2010, Torsella was nominated by President Barack Obama to the position of U.S. representative to the United Nations for Management and Reform, with the rank of Ambassador; on January 5, 2011, he was renominated after a lame duck session ended without his confirmation. He had a second hearing before the U.S. Senate Committee on Foreign Relations on March 16, 2011 (with Sen. Robert Casey, Jr. acting as chairman), and was confirmed by the U.S. Senate on April 19, 2011.

Torsella was the architect and chief public spokesperson for the Obama Administration plans, released in 2012, for reform of the $36 billion UN system. In his testimony to the U.S. Senate Foreign Relations Committee, Torsella said the UN "at its best" could be a "powerful tool" but that "too often, we have seen [the UN] at its worst," and criticized "waste, inefficiency ... abuse ... [and] political theater."

== Pennsylvania State Treasurer ==
=== Elections ===
==== 2016 ====
In 2015, Torsella announced his candidacy for State Treasurer of Pennsylvania. It was an open seat election. The position of treasurer was being held by Timothy A. Reese, who was nominated and confirmed in June 2015 following the resignation of Rob McCord. Reese promised not to run for election, when nominated for the appointment.

Torsella's policy proposals included universal college savings accounts, portable IRAs for Pennsylvania workers whose employers do not offer retirement savings plans, banning the corrupt practice of third-party marketers introducing money managers to the state, appointing a chief integrity officer for Treasury, creating an online Pennsylvania Sunshine Checkbook that shows all state spending, disclosing all state contracts on alternative investments, adding political contributions by contract-holders to the Treasury's state contracts database, and requiring those trading public funds to disclose their personal trades.

He also garnered high-profile endorsements from Barack Obama, Mayor Michael Bloomberg, and Governor Ed Rendell.

On November 8, 2016, Torsella was elected Treasurer, defeating Republican Otto Voit III of Berks County. Torsella captured 50.66% of the vote, winning by a larger margin (380,593 votes) than any other statewide candidate.

Torsella was sworn in as Pennsylvania's State Treasurer on January 17, 2017.

==== 2020 ====
Torsella sought a second term in 2020. He was unopposed in the Democratic primary, which was delayed due to the COVID-19 pandemic. In the general election, Torsella faced Republican nominee Stacy Garrity. Garrity ultimately defeated Torsella in his bid for a second term by a 48.6%–47.9% margin. Torsella's defeat was considered to be an upset, as he possessed a sizable fundraising advantage and consistently led Garrity in polling throughout the campaign.

=== Integrity initiatives ===
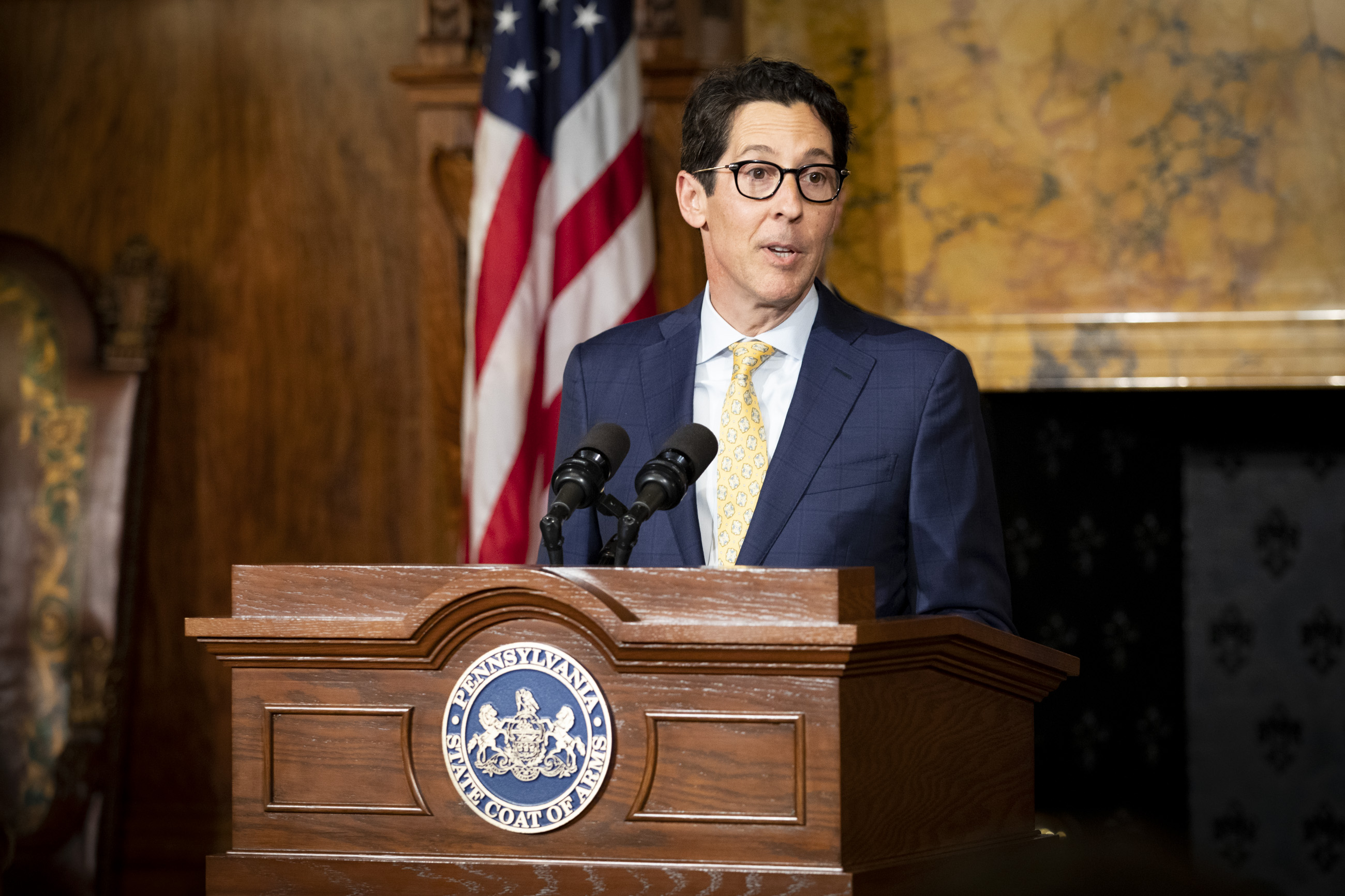
Torsella giving a press conference in 2019.

Torsella's first act as Treasurer was instating a formal ban on third-party placement agents. In his first week in office, Torsella implemented the Treasury Department's first ever code of conduct policy. The policy covers all personnel involved with investment activities and their immediate family members. That same week Torsella reduced the size of the Department's vehicle fleet by more than half, returning eleven vehicles to the Commonwealth.

Torsella appointed the Department's first ever Chief Integrity Officer in February 2017. He appointed Kenya Mann Faulkner to the position. She served as Pennsylvania's Inspector General under Tom Corbett’s Administration. Torsella continued his pursuit of integrity and accountability with new pre-payment auditing practices for the Treasury's Bureau of Fiscal Review. The new practices save more than $50 million annually.

In April 2017, Torsella transitioned all public equity investment holdings to a low-cost, index investment strategy. The action is estimated to save taxpayers $5 million a year. The move to index investments reduces fees and risk on investments while improving returns for taxpayers.

In June 2017, Torsella led a bipartisan effort of fellow state treasurers to help protect American families and their ability to save for retirement.

=== PA ABLE ===
In April 2017, Torsella teamed up with more than 200 disability advocates, families, state lawmakers and U.S. Senator Bob Casey to officially open Pennsylvania Achieving a Better Life Experience Act (ABLE) Savings Program. Casey sponsored the federal legislation that authorized states to establish ABLE accounts. PA ABLE allows those with disabilities and their families a way to save for disability related expenses without losing access to benefits they may depend on.

=== Keystone Scholars ===
In February 2018, Torsella, along with state lawmakers, announced the launch of the state's first universal children's savings program for higher education, Keystone Scholars. The pilot program provided a $100 grant as a starter deposit in a PA 529 plan for all babies born from the designated counties in 2018. The goal of the program is to encourage families to start saving early for postsecondary education expenses, and to encourage postsecondary education ambitions.

The demonstration project was funded by $2.25 million in private funds. Philanthropic funding sources include the PHEAA Foundation, the Neubauer Family Foundation, and the National Philanthropic Trust. Torsella became the program's first philanthropic donor in 2017, when he donated his automatic pay increase. He continues to donate his annual pay increase to Keystone Scholars.

Keystone Scholars legislation drew bipartisan support and was sponsored by Senators John Gordner (R) and Vincent Hughes (D), and Representative Duane Milne (R). Keystone Scholars was passed by Pennsylvania lawmakers in June 2018, and signed into law by Governor Tom Wolf. This legislative action made Pennsylvania the largest state in the country to implement an automatic universal children's savings account program. Starting January 1, 2019, all babies born or adopted to a Pennsylvania family qualify for the $100 Keystone Scholars grant.

=== Retirement security ===
In 2017, Torsella created the bipartisan Treasury Task Force on Private Sector Retirement Security to find ways to help the more than two million Pennsylvanians who do not have access to employee-sponsored retirement plans. The task force was charged with investigating the scale of the retirement crisis, cataloging solutions being enacted in surrounding states, and presenting options to empower Pennsylvanians to save for their retirement.

In March 2019, Treasurer Torsella released the final report of the task force. It provides overviews of each hearing's testimonies, a breakdown of other states’ efforts to combat the retirement crisis, and final recommendations.

=== Unclaimed property ===
Treasurer Torsella increased efforts to return unclaimed property being held by Treasury—returning hundreds of millions of dollars since taking office. This includes $91,000 that was returned to Children's Hospital of Philadelphia (CHOP) in a partnership with Good Morning America. CHOP donated the returned funds to its Violence Prevention Initiative that spearheads anti-bullying programs in schools.

Torsella initiated an effort to return unclaimed or abandoned military decorations to veterans and their families. Treasury's vault holds hundreds of military awards and medals, including Purple Hearts and Bronze Stars.

Torsella launched a dedicated database to search for lost military medals that may be held by Treasury for safekeeping.

=== Transparency portal ===
Torsella spearheaded the creation and launch of the state's first online tool to track state spending in real-time, the Transparency Portal. The Transparency Portal won national and global recognition.

The portal was launched in 2017 and made the General Fund balance available in real-time on the Treasury Department's homepage. Users also had access to monthly and annual expenditures, and the ability to see how any active lines of credit were affecting the General Fund.

The Transparency Portal was then relocated and expanded to its own website. The Treasury Department continuously works to further expand its capabilities. Taxpayers can use the tool to analyze state spending across all state departments and agencies.

=== Act 5 ===
As part of Act 5 enacted by the Pennsylvania legislature in 2017, Torsella served as vice-chair of the Public Pension Management and Asset Investment Review Commission (PPMAIRC) in 2018. PPMAIRC was responsible for conducting the first-ever independent review of the state's largest pension funds including the State Employees’ Retirement System (SERS) and the Pennsylvania Public School Employees’ Retirement System (PSERS).

=== Shareholder engagement ===
Torsella, as the overseer of all state investments, goes beyond his constitutional responsibility and urges companies the state invests in to operate in a socially responsible manner—including calling for changes to a company's corporate governance and practices that affect its role in major social or environmental issues.

Torsella has moved to hold drug manufacturers and distributors accountable for their role in the opioid epidemic. Torsella joined more than 40 institutional investors to form the Investors for Opioid Accountability Coalition. Together they filed 26 shareholder resolutions at 10 drug manufacturers and distributors calling for changes on issues connected to the opioid epidemic.

== Post-Pennsylvania Treasurer activities ==
=== Pennsylvania Public School Employees' Retirement System (PSERS) Board ===
In February 2021, Torsella was appointed to the Pennsylvania Public School Employees' Retirement System (PSERS) Board of Trustees by Governor Tom Wolf. The appointment is Torsella's first for the board but would result in his second time as a board member, after serving as an ex-officio member of both PSERS and the State Employees' Retirement System (SERS) during his four years as Pennsylvania State Treasurer. The appointment filled an open seat selected by the Governor, but it still had to be confirmed by a majority of the Pennsylvania State Senate, which voted unanimously for the confirmation in April 2021.

== Other endeavors ==
Torsella has served as a trustee or advisor to many civic and non-profit organizations, including the Philadelphia Convention and Visitors Bureau; the Holocaust Awareness Museum; Historic Philadelphia, Inc.; the Pennsylvania Heritage Foundation; the Springside School; The American University of Rome; and the Knight Foundation. He has written widely on historical and contemporary issues, with some of his work published in the [null New York Times], the Philadelphia Inquirer, the Cleveland Plain Dealer, and the Miami Herald. Torsella is a sought-after public speaker, and has appeared frequently in national broadcast media, including appearances on ABC World News Tonight, Good Morning America, and The Colbert Report.

In 1994, Torsella developed the Spaghetti Smock, a linen bib for adults.

In 2004, he founded a business consulting firm called 743 Ventures.

Since 2023, Torsella has taken a few acting roles in short films and an episode of The Mega-Brands That Built America.

== Personal life ==
Torsella and his wife, Carolyn Short Torsella, live in Flourtown, Pennsylvania, and have four children.

== See also ==
- National Constitution Center

Party political offices
| Preceded by Rob McCord | Democratic nominee for Treasurer of Pennsylvania; 2016, 2020 | Succeeded by Erin McClelland |
Non-profit organization positions
| Preceded by Robert Brasler | Chair and Chief Executive of the National Constitution Center; 1997–2003 | Succeeded by Rick Stengel |
| Preceded by Rick Stengel | Chair and Chief Executive of the National Constitution Center; 2006–2009 | Succeeded by Linda Johnson; Acting |
Political offices
| Preceded by Karl Girton | Secretary of Education of Pennsylvania; 2008–2011 | Succeeded by Larry Wittig |
| Preceded by Tim Reese | Treasurer of Pennsylvania; 2017–2021 | Succeeded by Stacy Garrity |
Diplomatic posts
| Preceded by Joseph Melrose; Acting | United States Ambassador to the United Nations for Management and Reform; 2011–2014 | Succeeded by Isobel Coleman |
