= David H. Rowe =

American politician

David Rowe
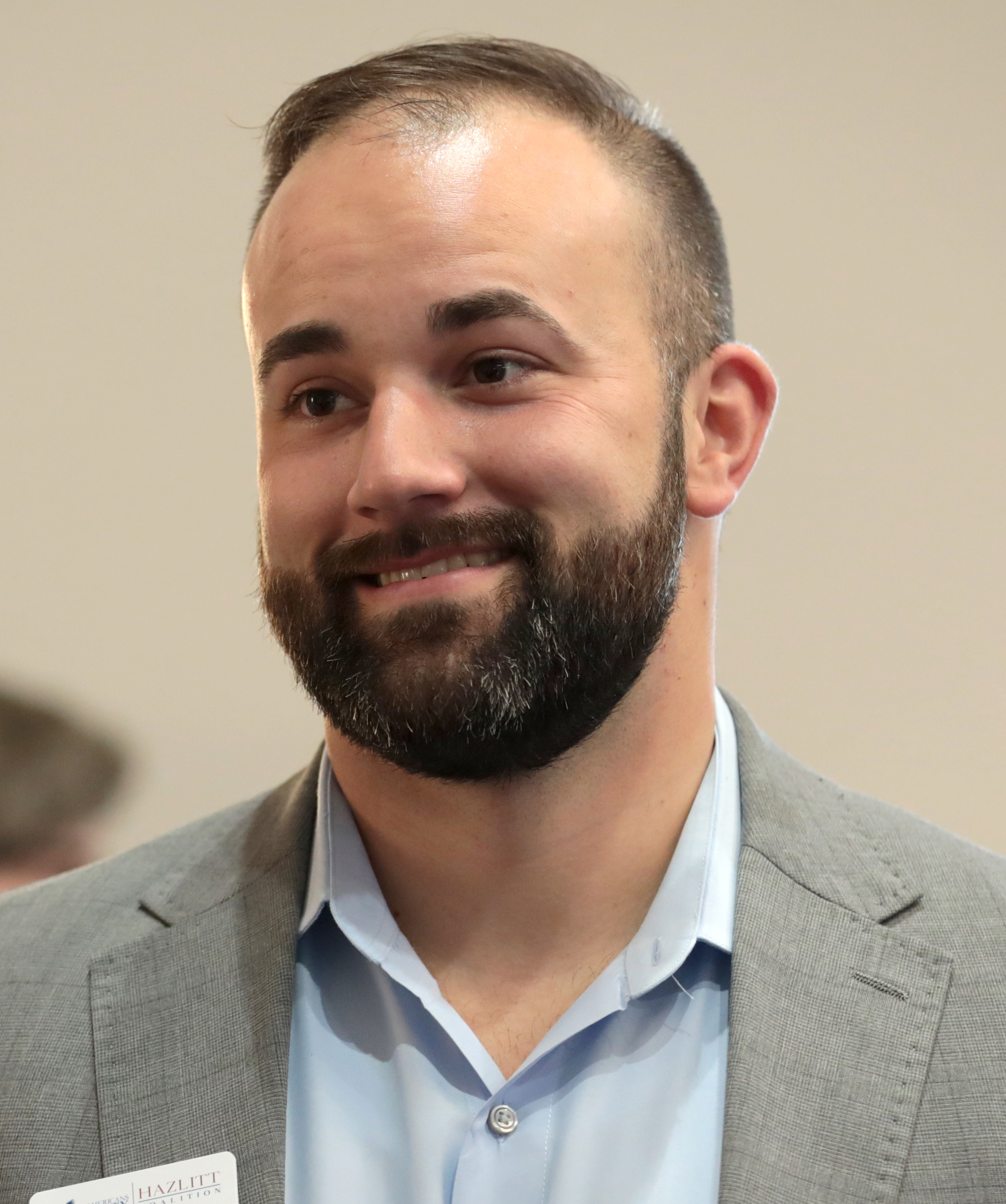
- Rowe at the 2022 Hazlitt Summit hosted by Young Americans for Liberty Foundation

Member of the Pennsylvania House of Representatives from the 85th district
- Incumbent
- Assumed office September 17, 2019
- Preceded by: Fred Keller

Personal details
- Born: February 10, 1991 (age 35)
- Party: Republican
- Website: Official website

David Hummer Rowe is an American politician from Pennsylvania. He is a member of the Republican Party and has represented the 85th District in the Pennsylvania House of Representatives since 2019.

== Early life ==
David Hummer Rowe was homeschooled and graduated in 2009. After graduating from homeschool, Rowe was a Christian missionary in Southeast Asia. While based in Taiwan, Rowe attended National Sun Yat-sen University (NSYSU), but has not disclosed whether he completed any specific program during his NSYSU experience. After returning to the states in 2010, Rowe established LBG Fitness Inc., a CrossFit gym.

== Political career ==
The East Buffalo Township Board of Supervisors selected Rowe to succeed Michael Daniloff in March 2018.

After Fred Keller vacated his seat in the Pennsylvania House of Representatives District 85 on May 24, 2019, Rowe contested the open seat. This necessitated Rowe's resignation from his East Buffalo Township post, in which he was succeeded by Jim Murphy. Rowe secured the Republican Party nomination, and defeated Democratic Party candidate Jennifer Rager-Kay, as well as write-in candidate Clair Moyer.

Rowe was sworn in as a member of the Pennsylvania House on September 17, 2019.

In January 2020, Rowe announced that he would seek reelection. No opposing candidate filed by the deadline to challenge Rowe's incumbency. He defeated Democratic Party candidate Katie Evans in the 2020 general election with a winning vote percentage of 68.2 percent vs 31.8 percent, within one percentage point of the Republican/Democratic affiliation breakdown of the 85th district.

Rowe has blocked individuals who criticize or question his statements and policies on social media. During the COVID-19 pandemic, Rowe posted a photo on social media Thanksgiving Eve at a bar, with a drink in hand, after 5 P.M. as a response to COVID state-level mitigation techniques.

In 2020, Rowe was among twenty-six Pennsylvania House Republicans who called for the reversal of Joe Biden's certification as the winner of Pennsylvania's electoral votes in the 2020 United States presidential election, citing false claims of election irregularities.

Rowe is the vice-chair of the Pennsylvania State Freedom Caucus. After securing re-election in 2024, David Rowe was named policy chair for the GOP caucus for the 2025-2026 session.

== Electoral history ==
2019 Pennsylvania House of Representatives special election, 85th District
Party	Candidate	Votes	%
Republican	David Hummer Rowe	6,489	62.59
Democratic	Jennifer Rager-Kay	3,879	37.41

2020 Pennsylvania House of Representatives election, 85th District
Party	Candidate	Votes	%
Republican	David Rowe	20,765	68.1
Democratic	Katie Evans	9,707	31.9

2022 Pennsylvania House of Representatives election, 85th District
Party	Candidate	Votes	%
Republican	David H. Rowe	21,244	88.65
Write-in		2,719	11.35
Total votes		23,963	100.00%

2024 Pennsylvania House of Representatives General election, 85th District
Party	Candidate	Votes	%
Republican	David Hummer Rowe	24,977	71.7
Democratic	Nick Jacobson	9,793	28.1
