= 2019 Pennsylvania Marsy's Law Amendment =

Crime victim rights measure

- November 5, 2019
- UNCERTIFIED RESULTS - Marsy's Law Amendment

Results
Choice	Votes	%
Yes	1,765,384	74.01%
No	620,104	25.99%
Yes
80–90%
70–80%
60–70%
50–60%
Data unavailable

In 2019, Pennsylvania voters decided on a state-level constitutional amendment to guarantee crime victims more legal rights, in a model named Marsy's Law. Over 74% voted in favor, but following a lawsuit which successfully argued that the amendment contained more than one topic, the Supreme Court of Pennsylvania declared that the results could not be certified.

== Background ==
=== Legislation for Amendment ===
Senate Bill 1011 (SB 1011) of the 2018 legislative session, and House Bill 276 (HB 276) of the 2019 legislative session placed the amendment on the ballot. (Note: Pennsylvania law requires for amendments to be passed by the legislature in two consecutive legislative sessions.)

=== 2018 session ===
SB 1011 was first voted on by the state Senate on March 21, 2018, and was agreed to in a unanimous, 50 to 0 vote. However, on June 5, the State House Judiciary Committee voted 26 to 0 to adopt an amendment to the bill, which had been offered by State Rep. Ron Marsico.

On June 20, the state House voted 197 to 0 to approve the bill.

June 20, 2018, vote in the state House
Political affiliation	Voted for	Voted against	Not voting
Democratic Party	79	-	3
Republican Party	118	-	3
Total	197	-	6

As the bill had been amended, it was sent back to the state Senate, where on June 21, it agreed to the new version in a 48 to 0 vote.

June 21, 2018, vote in the state Senate
Political affiliation	Voted for	Voted against	Not voting
Democratic Party	15	-	1
Republican Party	33	-	-
Total	48	-	1

=== 2019 session ===
HB276 was first voted on by the state House on April 8, 2019. This time, however, 8 representatives voted against.

April 8, 2019, vote in the state House
Political affiliation	Voted for	Voted against	Not voting
Democratic Party	84	7	2
Republican Party	106	1	2
Total	190	8	4

In the state Senate, the bill received a vote on June 19, where it was passed unanimously.

June 19, 2019, vote in the state Senate
Political affiliation	Voted for	Voted against	Not voting
Democratic Party	22	-	-
Republican Party	28	-	-
Total	50	-	-

== Contents ==
The following title and question was shown to voters:

PROPOSED AMENDMENT TO THE CONSTITUTION OF PENNSYLVANIA

Shall the Pennsylvania Constitution be amended to grant certain rights to crime victims, including to be treated with fairness, respect and dignity; considering their safety in bail proceedings; timely notice and opportunity to take part in public proceedings; reasonable protection from the accused; right to refuse discovery requests made by the accused; restitution and return of property; proceedings free from delay; and to be informed of these rights, so they can enforce them?

() YES

() NO

== Results ==
The following table shows the uncertified county-level results of the amendment: (Note: Because the results of the amendment were not certified, the county-by-county results were not posted by the Commonwealth of Pennsylvania. As such, results were obtained from individual counties, with a citation of where the information was obtained being included in the results table. Some county-level returns are certified and official, while others are one of the two or neither.)

County	Yes		No		Citation
County	#	%	#	%	Citation
Adams	11,565	78.76	3,119	21.24	
Allegheny	177,143	69.47	77,863	30.53	
Armstrong	8,204	63.86	4,642	36.14	
Beaver	27,764	79.19	7,295	20.81	
Bedford	6,866	67.11	3,365	32.89	
Berks	56,219	77.18	16,618	22.82	
Blair	16,920	75.77	5,412	24.23	
Bradford	9,434	77.65	2,716	22.35	
Bucks	100,000	75.56	32,343	24.44	
Butler	26,352	72.58	9,956	27.42	
Cambria	24,561	79.19	6,455	20.81	
Cameron	1,200	81.47	273	18.53	
Carbon	10,198	77.83	2,905	22.17	
Centre	19,530	65.7	10,197	34.30	
Chester	89,892	72.97	33,305	27.03	
Clarion	5,386	66.48	2,716	33.52	
Clearfield	11,979	74.85	4,025	25.15	
Clinton	5,023	68.87	2,270	31.13	
Columbia	7,087	73.65	2,536	26.35	
Crawford (Note: Results for the amendment could not be found for this county.)	-	-	-	-	
Cumberland	37,116	72.84	13,839	27.16	
Dauphin	34,761	75.48	11,295	24.52	
Delaware	84,376	76.45	25,987	23.55	
Elk	6,234	78.03	1,755	21.97	
Erie	41,328	77.97	11,674	22.03	
Fayette	15,094	77.84	4,298	22.16	
Forest	946	75.56	306	24.44	
Franklin	16,212	72.05	6,288	27.95	
Fulton	1,696	69.11	758	30.89	
Greene	6,834	74.75	2,308	25.25	
Huntingdon	5,404	67.29	2,627	32.71	
Indiana	11,098	69.68	4,828	30.32	
Jefferson	4,544	59.86	3,047	40.14	
Juniata	2,941	68.99	1,322	31.01	
Lackawanna	31,429	75.51	10,195	24.49	
Lancaster	53,849	75.84	17,152	24.16	
Lawrence	14,055	77.76	4,021	22.24	
Lebanon	16,229	73.7	5,790	26.30	
Lehigh	38,694	73.66	13,837	26.34	
Luzerne	34,050	74.43	11,696	25.57	
Lycoming	15,447	66.3	7,850	33.70	
McKean (Note: Results for the amendment could not be found for this county.)	-	-	-	-	
Mercer	15,042	74.04	5,275	25.96	
Mifflin	4,735	71.91	1,850	28.09	
Monroe	19,509	82.9	4,025	17.10	
Montgomery	133,224	74.05	46,699	25.95	
Montour	2,419	78.21	674	21.79	
Northampton	36,014	72.35	13,761	27.65	
Northumberland	10,713	75.58	3,462	24.42	
Perry (Note: Results for the amendment could not be found for this county.)	-	-	-	-	
Philadelphia	180,019	73.02	66,531	26.98	
Pike	5,867	78.59	1,598	21.41	
Potter	2,815	67.25	1,371	32.75	
Schuylkill	24,012	78.21	6,691	21.79	
Snyder	3,810	64.87	2,063	35.13	
Somerset	14,140	78.17	3,949	21.83	
Sullivan	1,268	72.71	476	27.29	
Susquehanna	6,541	73.59	2,347	26.41	
Tioga	5,677	70.29	2,399	29.71	
Union	4,968	64.47	2,738	35.53	
Venango	6,815	70.02	2,918	29.98	
Warren	6,070	72.13	1,640	19.49	
Washington	32,015	73.32	11,651	26.68	
Wayne	8,192	79.63	2,095	20.37	
Westmoreland	55,776	74.07	19,523	25.93	
Wyoming	4,610	72.23	1,772	27.77	
York	50,307	77.73	14,413	22.27	
State total	1,765,384	74.01	620,104	25.99	

== Aftermath ==
On October 10, 2019, the League of Women Voters of Pennsylvania and Lorraine Haw filed a lawsuit alleging that the measure violated Pennsylvania's constitutional amendment separate-vote requirement. The basis of this argument stemmed from Article XI of the Pennsylvania Constitution, which states: "When two or more amendments shall be submitted they shall be voted upon separately." The litigation also argued the summary provided on the ballot was incomplete.

On October 30, before Election Day, Judge Ellen Ceisler enjoined the acting secretary of state Kathy Boockvar from counting or certifying votes cast on the amendment, pending a final ruling.

On October 31, the next day, Boockvar appealed the injunction. On November 4, the Pennsylvania Supreme Court upheld the preliminary injunction in a 4 to 3 ruling.

=== Pennsylvania Commonwealth Court ===
On June 10, 2020, arguments for the case were heard by the Pennsylvania Commonwealth Court. On January 7, 2021, the court ruled 3 to 2 that the measure violated Pennsylvania's single-amendment rule.

The ruling was appealed by four individuals, Shameekah Moore, Martin Vickless, Kristin June Irwin, and Kelly Williams, to the Supreme Court of Pennsylvania, after Gov. Tom Wolf decided to not appeal the decision.

=== Pennsylvania Supreme Court ===
On September 21, 2021, arguments were heard by the court. On December 21, two months later, the court ruled 6 to 1 to upheld the Commonwealth Court's decision.
