= Russ Fairchild =

American politician

Member of the Pennsylvania House of Representatives from the 85th district
- In office January 3, 1989 – November 30, 2010
- Preceded by: John Showers
- Succeeded by: Fred Keller

Personal details
- Born: February 19, 1947 (age 79) Sunbury, Pennsylvania
- Party: Republican
- Spouse: Carol Fairchild
- Education: Penn State University
- Awards: Bronze Star

Military service
- Allegiance: United States of America
- Branch/service: United States Army
- Battles/wars: Vietnam War

Russell H. Fairchild (born February 19, 1947) is a Republican politician and former member of the Pennsylvania House of Representatives.

== Career ==
Fairchild has seen several of his bills become law, including Act 69 of 2005, that makes it illegal to take voyeuristic or "upskirting" photos and post them on the Internet. He also authored Ashley's Law, which requires school districts to set a policy allowing students with disabilities to be able to participate in high school commencement ceremonies, and two laws to improve the privacy of Social Security numbers.

== Personal ==
Fairchild was born in Sunbury and graduated from Lewisburg High School and Penn State University MontAlto campus. After college, he served in the U.S. Army and in Vietnam as an infantry platoon leader. Upon his return home in 1969, he started a heavy construction business with his brother in Winfield. He served as president of the company until his election to the House.

Fairchild is a recipient of the Bronze Star Medal and other combat citations for his Vietnam service. He is a member of the American Legion, an honorary member of the Military Order of Purple Heart, a lifetime member of the VFW and the Veterans of the Vietnam War.

Fairchild is married to Carol; they reside in East Buffalo Township, outside Lewisburg. Both are Penn State graduates. Now retired, his wife worked as an elementary teacher in the Selinsgrove School District.
