= Reno Thomas =

American politician

Reno H. Thomas

Member of the Pennsylvania House of Representatives from the 85th district
- In office 1969–1980
- Preceded by: District created
- Succeeded by: John Showers

Personal details
- Born: July 11, 1922 Beavertown, Pennsylvania
- Died: August 17, 2009 (aged 87) Beavertown, Pennsylvania
- Party: Republican

Reno H. Thomas (July 11, 1922 – August 17, 2009) was an American politician who was a Republican member of the Pennsylvania House of Representatives.
