= John Showers =

American politician

John R. Showers

Member of the Pennsylvania House of Representatives from the 85th district
- In office 1981–1988
- Preceded by: Reno Thomas
- Succeeded by: Russ Fairchild

Personal details
- Born: April 12, 1952 (age 74) Danville, Pennsylvania
- Party: Democratic

John R. Showers (born April 12, 1952) is a former Democratic member of the Pennsylvania House of Representatives. He was a representative from Snyder and Union Counties. He graduated Mifflinburg Area High School in 1970. He got a Bachelor's of the Arts at American University in 1974 and a Masters of the Arts at The University of Pittsburgh in 1980. He currently serves as a Union County Commissioner.
