= Brian Ellis (American politician) =

American politician

Brian L. Ellis

Member of the Pennsylvania House of Representatives from the 11th district
- In office January 4, 2005 – March 18, 2019
- Preceded by: Guy Travaglio
- Succeeded by: Marci Mustello

Personal details
- Born: 1969 (age 56–57) Butler, Pennsylvania, U.S.
- Party: Republican
- Spouse: Monica Ellis (div. 2019)
- Education: University of Pittsburgh

Brian L. Ellis (born 1969) is a former member of the Pennsylvania House of Representatives, who represented the 11th House district in Butler County. He served as Chairman of the House Consumer Affairs Committee until 2019.

== Personal ==
Born in 1969 in Butler, Pennsylvania, Ellis graduated from Butler Senior High School and graduated from the University of Pittsburgh with a degree in communications. Prior to his election, he worked for his family's automobile dealership in Western Pennsylvania.

== Political career ==
Ellis first won a seat in the House in 2004, finishing first in a three-way Republican Party (United States) primary and going on to defeat Democrat Fred Vero with 55.9% of the vote.

In 2006, he defeated a challenger in the Republican primary with 78% of the vote and won the general election over Democrat Bill Neel with over 64% of the vote.

Ellis was unopposed in the 2008 primary and was opposed in the general election by Democrat Dave Wilson. He was re-elected in the 2010 general election.

Ellis has served as the Pennsylvania State Leader for the American Legislative Exchange Council (ALEC).

=== Accusations and Resignation ===
In January 2019, the Dauphin County District Attorney's Office opened a criminal investigation into allegations Ellis had raped a female state employee while she was incapacitated, prompting members of the Pennsylvania state house, including the Republican leadership, to call for his resignation. The victim later issued a complaint to the Pennsylvania House Ethics Committee detailing the alleged assault. Ellis, who was married at the time, denied the accusations, but leading Republicans began to call for a full investigation. He resigned on March 18, 2019, six days after the complaint was issued.

In August 2019, Dauphin County District Attorney Fran Chardo declined to charge Ellis.
