= Global Tungsten & Powders Corp. =

Provider of refractory metal powders and specialty products

Global Tungsten & Powders
- Type: LLC
- Founded: 1916
- Headquarters: Towanda, Pennsylvania, United States
- Products: Refractory metal powders and specialty products
- Website: www.globaltungsten.com

Global Tungsten & Powders is a supplier for tungsten and molybdenum powders and specialty products. It is headquartered in Towanda, Pennsylvania and has an additional production site in Bruntál, Czech Republic.

== Products ==
The company offers refractory metal powders and specialty products. Since 2008 Global Tungsten & Powders is a fully owned subsidiary of the Plansee Group. To ensure security of supply of raw materials, Global Tungsten & Powders has signed several long-term supply contracts with tungsten mines in the Western world and took decisive steps to expand hard and soft scrap recycling.

== History ==
Global Tungsten & Powders began as the Patterson Screen Company in 1916, developing phosphors for the X-ray industry. Tungsten powder operations started in 1943, thermal spray powders in 1978. The processing of hard metal scrap to finished tungsten powders started 1990, soft scrap roaster were constructed 2006 and interconnect plates for solid oxide fuel cells in 2011. New markets are the energy exploration, green energy, hard materials and defense markets. Global Tungsten & Powders was purchased in 1993 by Osram.

Global Tungsten & Powders is made up of several businesses. Since 2008 it is a fully owned subsidiary of the Plansee Group with headquarters in Reutte, Austria.

Melissa Albeck was named President and CEO of Global Tungsten & Powders May 1, 2021.
