= Sayre Area High School =

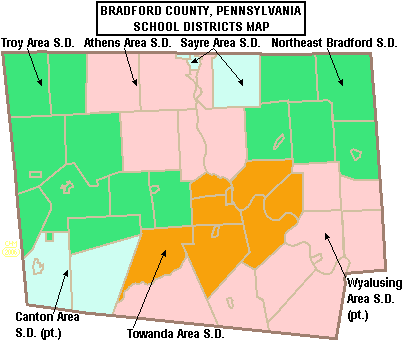

Location
- 333 West Lockhart Street; Sayre, Bradford County, Pennsylvania 18840; United States

Information
- Type: Public
- School district: Sayre Area School District
- Principal: Cambria Ely
- Teaching staff: 33.00 (FTE)
- Grades: 7–12
- Enrollment: 394 (2023–2024)
- Student to teacher ratio: 11.94
- Language: English
- Colors: Red and blue
- Fight song: On the Warpath
- Mascot: Redskins
- Newspaper: Sayrenade
- Website: https://www.sayresd.org/o/sasd/page/jr-sr-high-school

Sayre Area High School is a rural combined junior–senior high school in Sayre, Pennsylvania, United States. It serves two noncontiguous areas of Bradford County: Litchfield Township and the boroughs of Sayre and South Waverly. It is the sole junior and senior high school operated by the Sayre Area School District.

In the 2018–2019 school year, the school had 489 students in grades 7–12.

== Courses ==
Sayre Area High School students may choose to attend the Northern Tier Career Center for training in several areas: construction and mechanical trades (including auto mechanics), practical nursing, commercial driving, cosmetology, and food production management.

The BLaST Intermediate Unit 17 provides the school with a wide variety of services, including specialized education for disabled students, speech and visual disability services, state-mandated training on recognizing and reporting child abuse, criminal background check processing for prospective employees, and professional development for staff and faculty.

== Extracurricular activities ==
The district offers a variety of clubs and activities, as well as an extensive, publicly funded sports program.

=== Sports ===
The school provides:

Boys

- Baseball - A
- Basketball - AA
- Cross-country - A
- Football - AA
- Golf - AA
- Soccer - A
- Swimming and diving - AA
- Track and field - AA
- Wrestling - AA

Girls

- Basketball - AA
- Cheer - AAAA
- Cross-country - AA
- Soccer (fall) - A
- Softball - A
- Swimming and diving - AA
- Track and field - AA
- Volleyball - A

=== Junior high school sports ===
Boys

- Basketball
- Cross-country
- Football
- Soccer
- Track and field
- Wrestling

Girls

- Basketball
- Cheer
- Cross-country
- Track and field
- Volleyball
