= Pennsylvania House of Representatives, District 85 =

American legislative district

Pennsylvania's 85th State House of Representatives district
Representative
David H. Rowe; R–East Buffalo Township
- Population (2022): 66,424

The 85th Pennsylvania House of Representatives District is located in central Pennsylvania and has been represented by David H. Rowe since 2019.

== District profile ==
The 85th District encompasses part of Juniata County, Mifflin County, and Union County and all of Snyder County, and includes the following areas:

Juniata County

- Fayette Township
- Monroe Township

Mifflin County

- Burnham
- Decatur Township
- Derry Township

Snyder County

- Middleburg
- Selinsgrove
- Shamokin Dam

Union County

- East Buffalo Township
- Union Township

== Representatives ==
Representative	Party	Years	District home	Note
Prior to 1969, seats were apportioned by county.
Reno Thomas	Republican	1969 – 1980		
John Showers	Democrat	1981 – 1988		
Russ Fairchild	Republican	1989 – 2010	Lewisburg	
Fred Keller	Republican	2011 – 2019		Resigned after elected to United States House of Representatives
David H. Rowe	Republican	2019 – present		

== Recent election results ==
PA House election, 2024: Pennsylvania House, District 85
Party	Candidate	Votes	%
Republican	David H. Rowe (incumbent)	24,977	71.83
Democratic	Nick Jacobson	9,793	28.17
Total votes		34,770	100.00
Republican hold			

PA House election, 2022: Pennsylvania House, District 85
Party	Candidate	Votes	%
Republican	David H. Rowe (incumbent)	Unopposed	
Total votes		21,244	100.00
Republican hold			

PA House election, 2020: Pennsylvania House, District 85
Party	Candidate	Votes	%
Republican	David H. Rowe (incumbent)	20,783	68.14
Democratic	Kathleen Evans	9,719	31.86
Total votes		30,502	100.00
Republican hold			

PA House special election, 2019: Pennsylvania House, District 85
Party	Candidate	Votes	%
Republican	David H. Rowe	6,489	62.59
Democratic	Jennifer Rager-Kay	3,879	37.41
Total votes		10,368	100.00
Republican hold			

PA House election, 2018: Pennsylvania House, District 85
Party	Candidate	Votes	%
Republican	Fred Keller (incumbent)	14,714	67.73
Democratic	Jennifer Rager-Kay	7,012	32.27
Total votes		21,726	100.00
Republican hold			

PA House election, 2016: Pennsylvania House, District 85
Party	Candidate	Votes	%
Republican	Fred Keller (incumbent)	Unopposed	
Total votes		21,304	100.00
Republican hold			
