= 2019 Pennsylvania's 12th congressional district special election =

Pennsylvania's 12th congressional district special election
- May 21, 2019

Pennsylvania's 12th congressional district
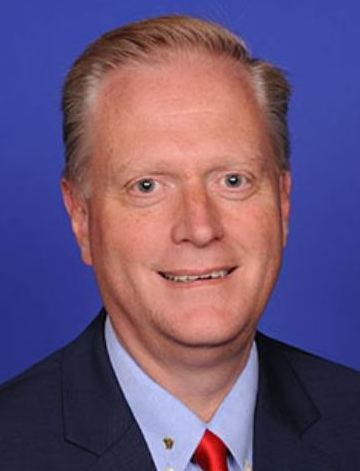

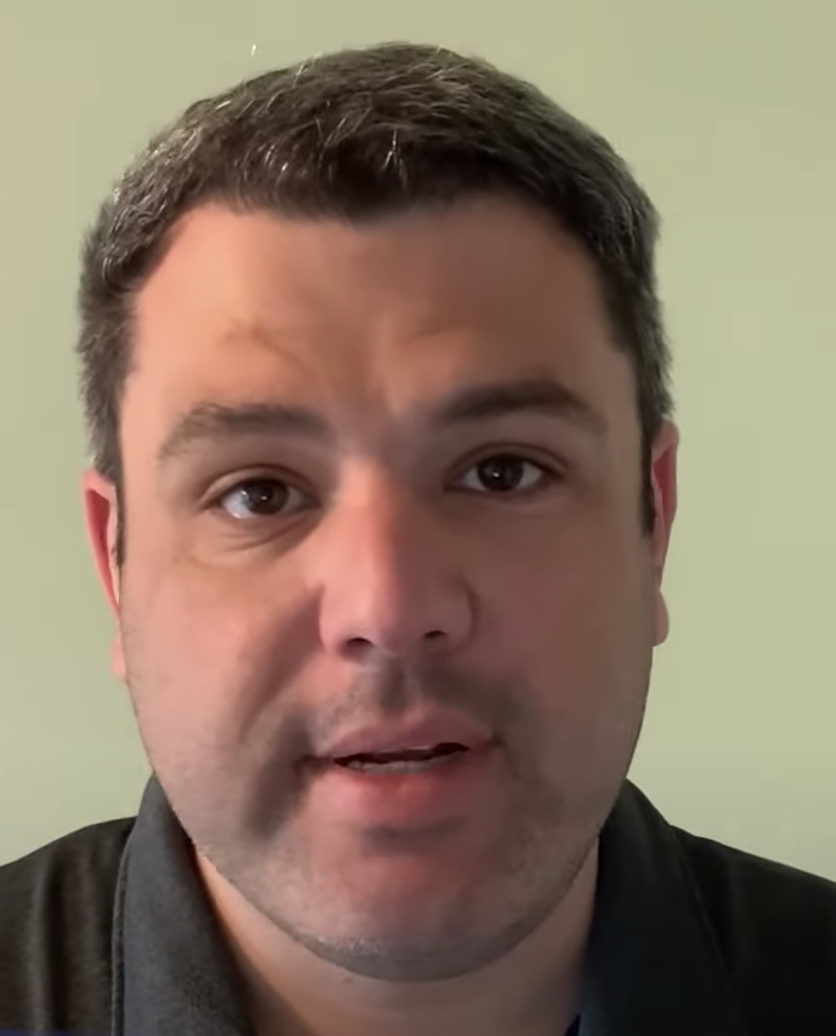
Nominee	Fred Keller	Marc Friedenberg
Party	Republican	Democratic
Popular vote	90,000	42,195
Percentage	68.08%	31.92%
- County results Keller: 60–70% 70–80% 80–90% Friedenberg: 60–70%
U.S. Representative before election
Tom Marino
Republican
Elected U.S. Representative
Fred Keller
Republican

A special election was held on May 21, 2019, to fill the remainder of the term for Pennsylvania's 12th congressional district in the United States House of Representatives for the 116th United States Congress. Tom Marino, a Republican, resigned from office effective January 23.

== Background ==
As a result of the 2018 elections, Pennsylvania's House delegation to the 116th U.S. Congress took office in early January 2019 with a tie of 9 Republicans and 9 Democrats.

Republican Tom Marino, the incumbent representative for Pennsylvania's 12th congressional district, announced his resignation effective January 23, 2019. By state law, Governor Tom Wolf was required to call for a special election at least 60 days after the seat became vacant. Wolf set the election for May 21. Primary elections were not held in the race. Instead, nominees were chosen by each party. Republicans selected their nominee on March 2.

== Republican conferee meeting ==
=== Candidates ===
==== Nominee ====
- Fred Keller, state representative

==== Defeated at the convention ====
- Jessica Bowman-Hosley, professor
- Malcolm Derk, former Snyder County commissioner
- Kevin Ferrara, veteran
- Stacy Garrity, businesswoman
- Davis C. Haire, doctor
- Chris Hoffman, vice president of the Pennsylvania Farm Bureau
- Matthew McDermott
- Doug McLinko, Bradford County commissioner and candidate for Pennsylvania's 12th congressional district in 2018
- Patrick Miller, law student
- Maria Montero
- Joseph Moralez, vice president of a statewide nursing agency
- Robert Noerr, former National Debate Tournament qualifier
- Joseph Peters, former state deputy attorney general and candidate for Pennsylvania's 8th congressional district in 2018

==== Withdrawn ====
- Christopher Bain
- James Canning, businessman and constable
- Gerald Carlin, businessman
- Brian Fuller, activist
- Bobby Jeffries
- Dale McElhattan
- Chuck Risio
- Matthew Timm
- Jeff Wheeland, state representative
- Matthew Zeigler, lawyer

==== Declined to run ====
- Lou Barletta, former U.S. Representative and nominee for U.S. Senate in 2018
- Jake Corman, majority leader of the Pennsylvania State Senate
- Keith Eckel, former president of the State Farm Bureau
- Jonathan Fritz, state representative
- Davis C. Haire
- Sandra Major, former state representative
- Tony Mussare, Lycoming County commissioner
- Michael Peifer, state representative
- Mario Scavello, state senator
- Jeff Stroehmann, businessman
- Dave Weber, district director for outgoing U.S. Representative Tom Marino
- Eugene Yaw, state senator

== Democratic selection ==
According to the Pennsylvania Democratic Party, Marc Friedenberg, the Democratic nominee for the district in 2018, was the only individual who submitted an application to be the nominee. Therefore, the convention was cancelled, and the party declared Friedenberg the nominee on February 12.

== General election ==
=== Endorsements ===
Fred Keller (R)

Federal politicians

- Donald Trump, President of the United States
- Tom Marino, former U.S. Representative (PA-12)
- G.T. Thompson, U.S. Representative (PA-15)
- Guy Reschenthaler, U.S. Representative (PA-14)
- Lou Barletta, former U.S. Representative (PA-11) and Republican nominee for U.S. Senate in 2018

Local officeholders

- Joe Kantz, Snyder County Commissioner Chairman
- John Zechman, Snyder County Sheriff
- Preston Boop, Union County Commissioner Chairman
- Lee Knepp, Snyder County Commissioner Vice Chairman

Organizations

- American Conservative Union
- U.S. Chamber of Commerce
- National Right to Life Committee
- Pennsylvania Pro-Life Federation
- National Federation of Independent Business
- NRA Political Victory Fund
- BIPAC
- Fraternal Order of Police Bald Eagle Lodge 51 (Centre County)
- Susan B. Anthony List
Marc Friedenberg (D)

Federal politicians

- Bob Casey Jr., U.S. Senator (D-PA)
- Joe Sestak, former U.S. Representative (PA-7)
- Robert Reich, former U.S. Secretary of Labor

Statewide and local politicians

- John Fetterman, Lieutenant Governor of Pennsylvania

Labor unions

- Pennsylvania AFL–CIO

Organizations

- Democratic Jewish Outreach Pennsylvania
- Progressive Democrats of America
- Sierra Club Pennsylvania Chapter

=== Debates ===
Dates	Location	Keller	Friedenberg	Link
May 2, 2019	Luzerne County	Participant	Participant	

=== Fundraising ===
Campaign finance reports as of June 30, 2019
Candidate (party)	Total receipts	Total disbursements	Cash on hand
Fred Keller (R)	$662,214.65	$521,614.93	$140,599.72
Marc Friedenberg (D)	$209,045.81	$230,037.21	$81,108.15
Source: Federal Election Commission

=== Results ===
Pennsylvania's 12th congressional district special election, 2019
Party	Candidate	Votes	%	±%
Republican	Fred Keller	90,000	68.08%	+2.04%
Democratic	Marc Friedenberg	42,195	31.92%	−2.04%
Total votes		132,195	100.0%	N/A
Republican hold				

==== By county ====
County	Fred Keller Republican		Marc Friedenberg Democratic		Margin		Total votes cast
County	#	%	#	%	#	%	Total votes cast
Bradford	7,133	70.5%	2,985	29.5%	4,148	41.0%	10,118
Centre (part)	4,769	33.8%	9,360	66.2%	-4,591	-32.4%	14,129
Clinton	4,235	62.6%	2,534	37.4%	1,701	25.2%	6,769
Juniata	3,557	77.5%	1,033	22.5%	2,524	55.0%	4,590
Lycoming	20,493	73.7%	7,309	26.3%	13,184	47.4%	27,802
Mifflin	4,524	75.3%	1,484	24.7%	3,040	50.6%	6,008
Northumberland (part)	7,078	73.5%	2,558	26.5%	4,520	47.0%	9,636
Perry	6,037	74.5%	2,071	25.5%	3,966	49.0%	8,108
Potter	2,744	76.2%	856	23.8%	1,888	42.4%	3,600
Snyder	6,288	78.4%	1,729	21.6%	4,559	56.8%	8,017
Sullivan	1,142	67.2%	557	32.8%	585	34.4%	1,699
Susquehanna	5,780	68.9%	2,606	31.1%	3,174	37.8%	8,386
Tioga	6,057	73.8%	2,145	26.2%	3,912	47.6%	8,202
Union	6,151	66.9%	3,049	33.1%	3,102	33.8%	9,200
Wyoming	4,012	67.6%	1,919	32.4%	2,093	35.2%	5,931
Totals	90,000	68.1%	42,195	31.9%	47,805	36.2%	132,195

== See also ==
- List of special elections to the United States House of Representatives
