= Nasim Fekrat =

Afghan blogger and journalist

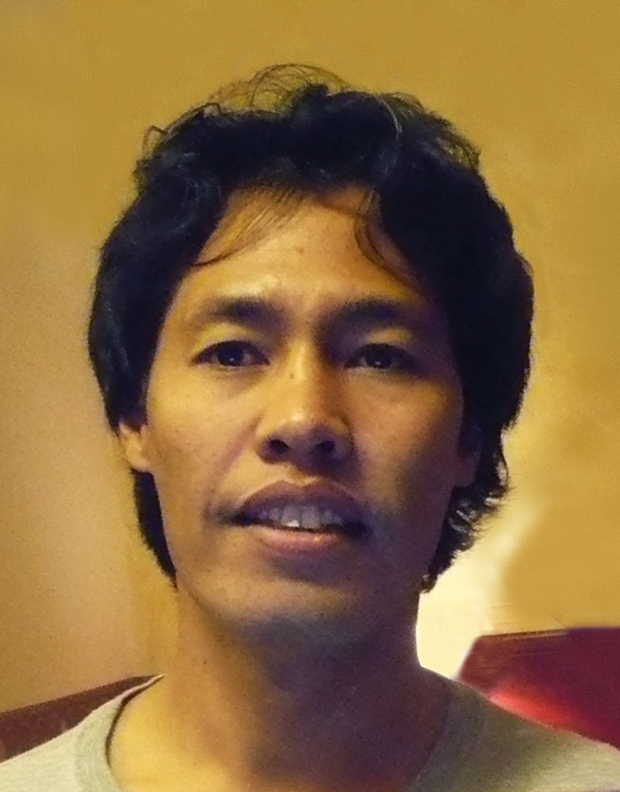
Fekrat in 2008

Nasim Fekrat (Persian: نسیم فکرت) is a Hazara journalist and blogger from Afghanistan who worked for various media outlets.

== Career and recognition ==
He is a two-time winner of the freedom of expression awards; in 2005 from France Reporters Sans Frontieres (RSF) and in 2008 from ISF (Information Safety and Freedom) in Siena, Italy. Nasim is the editor of the Afghan Lord blog as well as directing the Association of Afghan Blog Writers (AABW). His work has appeared on BBC Persian, CNN, Foreign Policy Magazine, his own news sites, and publications run by both NATO and the United Nations. As the leader of a small movement of young journalists, Nasim advocates for a free press in Afghanistan.
