= Marci Mustello =

American politician

Member of the Pennsylvania House of Representatives from the 11th district
- Incumbent
- Assumed office June 4, 2019
- Preceded by: Brian Ellis

Personal details
- Born: July 25, 1970 (age 55) Butler, Pennsylvania, U.S.
- Party: Republican

Marci Mustello is an American politician. She is a Republican representing the 11th district in the Pennsylvania House of Representatives.

== Political career ==
Mustello worked as a staffer for Congressman Mike Kelly from 2011 to 2019.

In 2019, Mustello ran in a special election to represent District 11 in the Pennsylvania House of Representatives, after former representative Brian Ellis resigned over sexual assault allegations. She defeated Democrat Sam Doctor to win. In 2020, she defeated Ryan Covert in the Republican primary, and Sam Doctor again in the general election.

=== Committee assignments ===
- Agriculture & rural affairs
- Human services
- Liquor control
- Transportation

=== Electoral record ===
2019 special general election: Pennsylvania House of Representatives, District 11
Party	Candidate	Votes	%
Republican	Marci Mustello	5,953	57.5
Democratic	Sam Doctor	4,402	42.5
Total votes		10,355	100.0
Republican hold			

2020 Republican primary: Pennsylvania House of Representatives, District 11
Party	Candidate	Votes	%
Republican	Marci Mustello (incumbent)	5,104	53.9
Republican	Ryan Covert	4,362	46.1
Total votes		9,466	100.0

2020 general election: Pennsylvania House of Representatives, District 11
Party	Candidate	Votes	%
Republican	Marci Mustello (incumbent)	19,067	81.6
Democratic	Sam Doctor	4,307	18.4
Total votes		23,374	100.0
Republican hold			

Political offices
Pennsylvania House of Representatives
Preceded by Brian L. Ellis	Member of the Pennsylvania House of Representatives from the 11th district 2019–present	Incumbent
