= Pam Iovino =

American politician

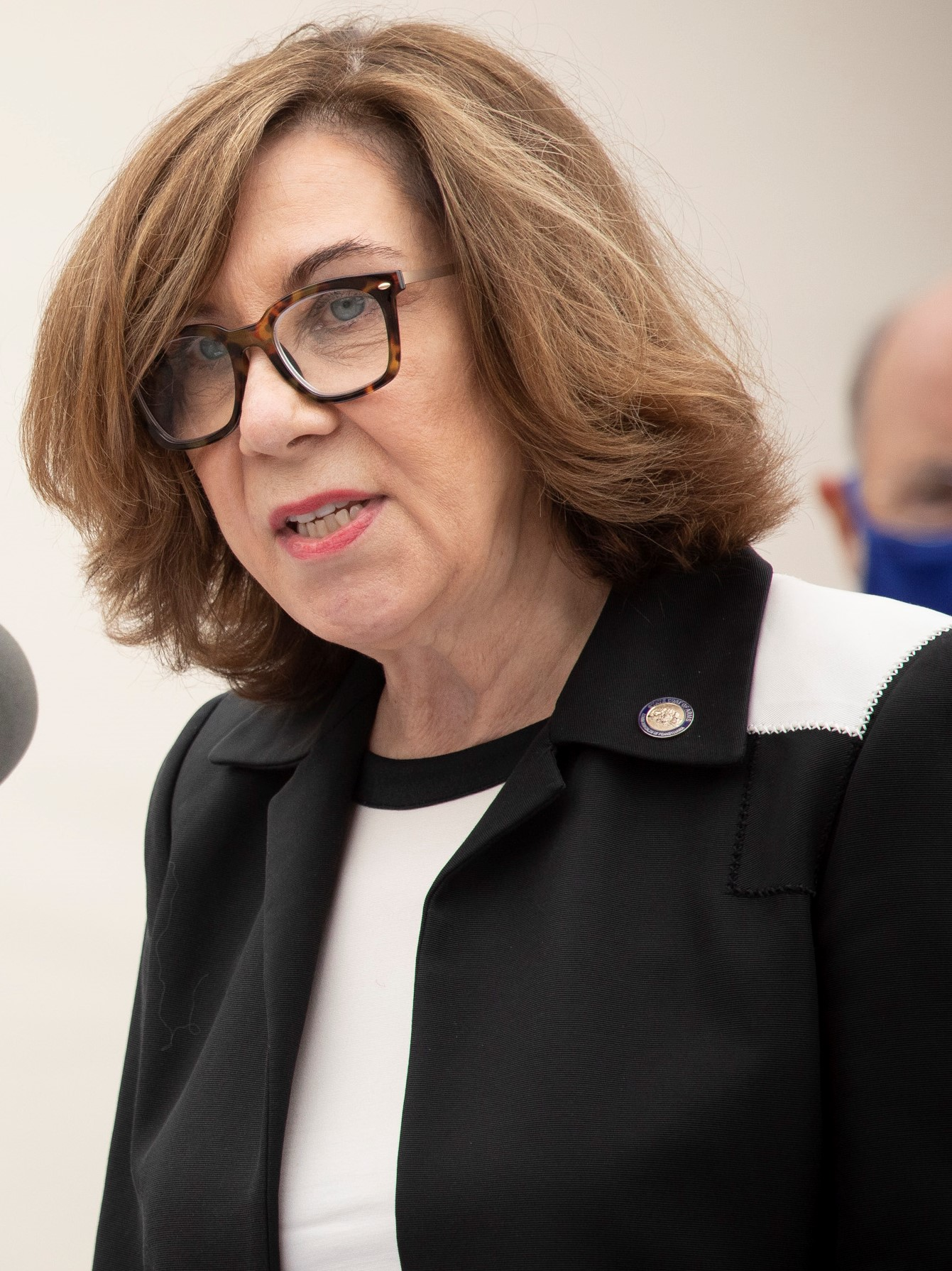

Member of the Pennsylvania Senate from the 37th district
- In office April 29, 2019 – November 30, 2020
- Preceded by: Guy Reschenthaler
- Succeeded by: Devlin Robinson

Personal details
- Born: July 23, 1956 (age 70)
- Party: Democratic
- Education: Gettysburg College (BA); Naval War College (MA)
- Website: Campaign website

Military service
- Allegiance: United States
- Branch/service: United States Navy
- Years of service: 1980–2003
- Rank: Captain

Pamela Marie Iovino is an American politician from the Commonwealth of Pennsylvania. A Democrat, she was elected to the Pennsylvania State Senate for the 37th district and served from 2019 to 2020.

== Education and early career ==
Iovino was raised in a suburb outside Pittsburgh. She graduated from Gettysburg College with a bachelor's degree in political science in 1978. She joined the United States Navy as an ensign in 1980. She eventually earned the rank of captain. Iovino earned a Master of Arts in national security and strategic studies from the Naval War College in 1993. In 2004, Iovino became Assistant Secretary in the United States Department of Veterans Affairs for Congressional and Legislative Affairs.

== Earlier political career ==
Following Tim Murphy's resignation from the United States House of Representatives from Pennsylvania's 18th congressional district in 2017, Iovino sought to become the Democratic Party nominee in the special election to succeed him.

On November 19, 2017, local Democrats chose former U.S. Assistant Attorney Conor Lamb during a nominating convention instead. Iovino placed third on both ballots, trailing behind Westmoreland County Commissioner Gina Cerilli and Lamb, the eventual special election winner.

== Pennsylvania Senate ==
After Guy Reschenthaler, who represented the 37th district in the Pennsylvania State Senate, was elected to the United States House of Representatives in 2018, a special election was called to fill the remainder of his term in the state senate.

Democrats selected Iovino as their nominee, and she faced Republican D. Raja. On April 2, 2019, Iovino defeated Raja, receiving 52% of the vote. Iovino was formally sworn in on April 29, 2019.

During the COVID-19 pandemic, Iovino sponsored an amendment clarifying that volunteer firefighting companies could use Volunteer Firefighting Relief Association funds to sanitize and disinfect equipment. In July 2020, Iovino signed a letter urging Governor Tom Wolf to ease restrictions on bars and restaurants.

In July 2020, Iovino lost her wallet, which was coincidentally found and returned by her Republican opponent Devlin Robinson.

Iovino was defeated by Devlin Robinson on November 3, 2020.
