= Tim Reese =

American politician from Pennsylvania

Timothy Reese

77th Treasurer of Pennsylvania
- In office July 1, 2015 – January 17, 2017
- Governor: Tom Wolf
- Preceded by: Rob McCord
- Succeeded by: Joe Torsella

Personal details
- Born: 1963 or 1964 (age 62–63)
- Party: Independent
- Spouse: Deirdre Guice (2022) Previous spouse Sara Lomax Reese
- Children: 3
- Education: Temple University (BS)

Tim Reese was the Treasurer of Pennsylvania from 2015 to 2017. He was succeeded by Joe Torsella.

== Early life and education ==
Reese holds a Bachelor of Science degree in Electrical Engineering & Electronics Technology from Temple University and was a Fellow at Temple University Fox School of Business.

== Career ==
After Treasurer Rob McCord resigned in 2015, Reese was nominated for the position by Governor Wolf. As Treasurer of the Commonwealth of Pennsylvania, Reese served as chief executive of the Treasury Department and oversaw an operating budget of more than $40 million and a staff of approximately 350 employees. He served as the chair of the Board of Finance and Revenue, which selects banks to serve as state depositories; sets interest rates paid on Commonwealth deposits; and hears and decides state tax appeals.

During a state budget crisis, Reese avoided a financial shutdown and chaired the investment committee to re-allocate over $1 billion in investments and apply new investment strategies. He established an emerging managers program and invested in affordable housing, small business and infrastructure projects. He developed a Small Business Initiative public–private partnership and implemented an internal training program to promote best practices and employee career growth.

Reese began his career with Honeywell, where he focused on applying software solutions for the paper industry. He was responsible for bringing new products and production capacity on-line. Reese left Honeywell to work with several new technology ventures from 1993 to 2015, serving in positions as manager of information systems, senior vice president, chief technology officer, chief finance officer, and chief executive officer during this time.

== Personal life ==
Reese is married to Deirdre Guice (2022). He was previously married to Sara Lomax and they have three children. In 2012, he started the National Minority Angel Network to promote investment in companies owned by women, minorities, and veterans. As a panelist during Philly Tech Week 2017, Reese spoke on the benefit of a business plan for minority startups.

Political offices
Preceded by Robert McCord	Treasurer of Pennsylvania; 2015–2017	Succeeded by Joe Torsella
