= Fred Keller (politician) =

American politician (born 1965)

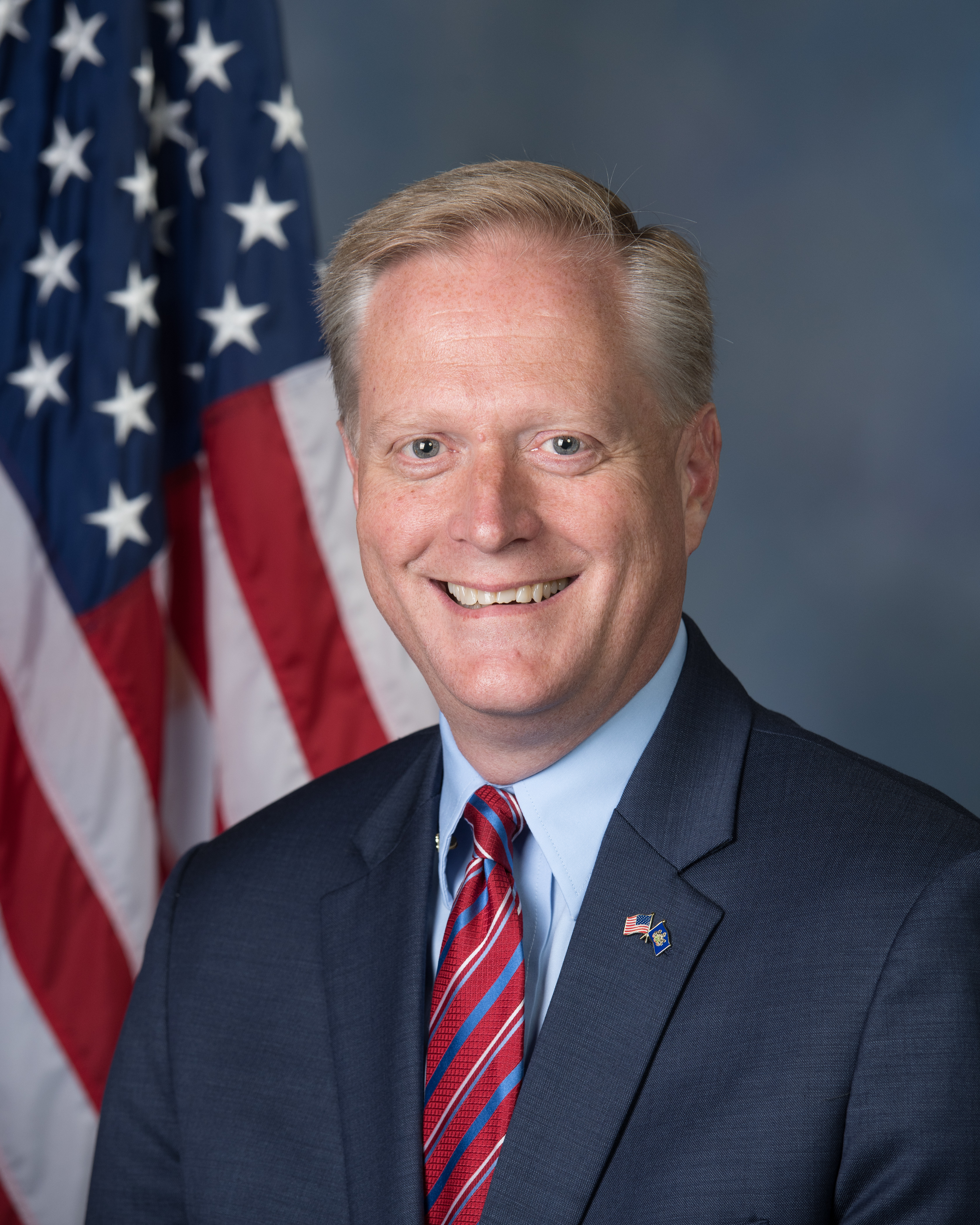
- Official portrait, 2019

Member of the U.S. House of Representatives from Pennsylvania's 12th district
- In office May 21, 2019 – January 3, 2023 (Note: Keller's official service begins on the date of the special election, while he was not sworn in until June 23, 2019.)
- Preceded by: Tom Marino
- Succeeded by: Summer Lee

Member of the Pennsylvania House of Representatives from the 85th district
- In office January 4, 2011 – May 22, 2019
- Preceded by: Russ Fairchild
- Succeeded by: David H. Rowe

Personal details
- Born: October 23, 1965 (age 60) Page, Arizona, U.S.
- Party: Republican
- Spouse(s): Kay Payne (m. 1985)
- Children: 2

Frederick B. Keller (born October 23, 1965) is an American politician from the Commonwealth of Pennsylvania, who served as the U.S. representative for Pennsylvania's 12th congressional district from 2019 to 2023. He was a Republican member of the Pennsylvania House of Representatives for the 85th district from 2011 until his resignation in May 2019 following election to the U.S. House.

On February 28, 2022, Keller announced that he would not seek reelection in 2022 after being drawn out of his congressional district.

== Early life and career ==
Keller was born in Page, Arizona, to parents who were native Pennsylvanians that had moved west for work. After graduating from Shikellamy High School in 1984, Keller got a job at Conestoga Wood Specialties, a factory that makes cabinets and other wooden kitchen products, in Beavertown, Pennsylvania. He was ultimately promoted to become the plant operations manager. In 1990, Keller began a real estate property business, and attended Don Paul Shearer Real Estate school in 1995.

== Pennsylvania House of Representatives ==
In 2010, Keller ran as a Republican for the Pennsylvania House of Representatives in the 85th district, seeking to succeed Republican Russ Fairchild, who was retiring. He was elected to the Pennsylvania House, and was reelected every two years through 2018. He was appointed to the board of trustees of the Pennsylvania Public School Employees' Retirement System in 2019.

== U.S. House of Representatives ==
=== Elections ===
==== 2019 special election ====
Following Tom Marino's resignation from the United States House of Representatives in January 2019, Keller declared his candidacy in the 2019 Pennsylvania's 12th congressional district special election.

He won the Republican nomination at a conference meeting on March 2. Keller won the general election on May 21, defeating previous 2018 Democratic nominee Marc Friedenberg, and resigned from his state House seat on May 22. He was sworn in on June 3.

==== 2020 ====
Keller ran for and won reelection on November 3, 2020, against Lee Griffin, gaining 70.8% of the vote.

=== Tenure ===
In December 2020, Keller was one of 126 Republican members of the House of Representatives who signed an amicus brief in support of Texas v. Pennsylvania, a lawsuit filed at the United States Supreme Court contesting the results of the 2020 presidential election, in which Joe Biden prevailed over incumbent Donald Trump. The Supreme Court declined to hear the case on the basis that Texas lacked standing under Article III of the Constitution to challenge the results of the election held by another state.

House Speaker Nancy Pelosi issued a statement that called signing the amicus brief an act of "election subversion." Additionally, Pelosi reprimanded Keller and the other House members who supported the lawsuit: "The 126 Republican Members that signed onto this lawsuit brought dishonor to the House. Instead of upholding their oath to support and defend the Constitution, they chose to subvert the Constitution and undermine public trust in our sacred democratic institutions."

==== Immigration ====
Keller voted against the Further Consolidated Appropriations Act of 2020, which authorizes DHS to nearly double the available H-2B visas for the remainder of FY 2020.

Keller voted against the Consolidated Appropriations Act (H.R. 1158), which effectively prohibits ICE from cooperating with Health and Human Services to detain or remove illegal alien sponsors of unaccompanied alien children (UACs).

=== Committee assignments ===
- Committee on Education and Labor
  - Subcommittee on Early Childhood, Elementary and Secondary Education
- Committee on Oversight and Reform

=== Caucus memberships ===
- Chairman, Bureau of Prisons Reform Caucus
- Conservative Climate Caucus
- Republican Study Committee

== Electoral history ==
Pennsylvania's 12th congressional district special election, 2019
Party	Candidate	Votes	%	±%
Republican	Fred Keller	90,000	68.1%	+2.0%
Democratic	Marc Friedenberg	42,195	31.9%	−2.0%
Total votes		132,195	100.0%	N/A
Republican hold				

Pennsylvania's 85th house district election, 2018
Party	Candidate	Votes	%	±%
Republican	Fred Keller (incumbent)	14,714	67.7%	−32.3%
Democratic	Jennifer Rager-Kay	7,012	32.3%	N/A
Total votes		21,726	100.0%	N/A
Republican hold				

Pennsylvania's 85th house district election, 2016
Party	Candidate	Votes	%	±%
Republican	Fred Keller (incumbent)	21,304	100.0%	+30.8%
Total votes		21,304	100.0%	N/A
Republican hold				

Pennsylvania's 85th house district election, 2014
Party	Candidate	Votes	%	±%
Republican	Fred Keller (incumbent)	10,895	69.2%	−11.9%
Democratic	Michael Sundberg	4,857	30.8%	N/A
Total votes		15,752	100.0%	N/A
Republican hold				

Pennsylvania's 85th house district election, 2012
Party	Candidate	Votes	%	±%
Republican	Fred Keller (incumbent)	16,900	81.1%	15.1%
Libertarian	Erik Viker	3,935	18.9%	9.9%
Total votes		20,835	100.0%	N/A
Republican hold				

Pennsylvania's 85th house district election, 2010
Party	Candidate	Votes	%	±%
Republican	Fred Keller	11,412	66.0%	−4.4%
Democratic	Trey Casimir	4,323	25.0%	−4.6%
Libertarian	Erik Viker	1,551	9.0%	N/A
Total votes		17,286	100.0%	N/A
Republican hold				

Pennsylvania's 85th house district Republican primary election, 2010
Party	Candidate	Votes	%	±%
Republican	Fred Keller	3,237	44.9%	N/A
Republican	Maurice Brubaker	2,092	29.0%	N/A
Republican	Betsy M. Snook	1,886	26.1%	N/A
Total votes		7,215	100.0%	N/A

== Personal life ==
Keller has three siblings. Soon after he began working, Keller married his wife Kay. Together, they have two grown children, one of whom survived after being hospitalized on life support and being told there was no chance for recovery. As of April 2019, the Kellers also had two grandchildren.

Keller is a Congregationalist.

== Controversies ==
In a private text message, Keller suggested to White House Chief of Staff Mark Meadows that President Trump state that he was only testing Raffensperger's loyalty to Trump when Trump asked Raffensperger to find 11,780 votes.

Keller voted against certifying Pennsylvania's electoral votes in the 2020 presidential election. WITF refers to him as "Fred Keller, who voted against certifying Pennsylvania's election results for President Biden despite no evidence to support election-fraud claims."

Keller signed onto the unsuccessful Texas-led lawsuit to overturn the results of the 2020 presidential election.

U.S. House of Representatives
Preceded by Tom Marino	Member of the U.S. House of Representatives from Pennsylvania's 12th congressional district 2019–2023	Succeeded by Summer Lee
U.S. order of precedence (ceremonial)
Preceded by Conor Lamb as Former U.S. Representative	Order of precedence of the United States as Former U.S. Representative	Succeeded by Jon Runyan Sr. as Former U.S. Representative
