= Pennsylvania House of Representatives, District 11 =

American legislative district

Pennsylvania's 11th State House of Representatives district
Representative
Marci Mustello; R–Butler County
- Population (2022): 64,833

Pennsylvania House of Representatives District 11 is a legislative district located in western Pennsylvania. It has been represented by Republican Marci Mustello since 2019.

== District profile ==
The 11th Pennsylvania House of Representatives District is located in Butler County and includes the following areas:

- Buffalo Township
- Butler
- Butler Township
- Chicora
- Clearfield Township
- Clinton Township
- Donegal Township
- East Butler
- Jefferson Township
- Oakland Township
- Saxonburg
- Summit Township
- Winfield Township

== Recent election results ==
PA House election, 2024: Pennsylvania House, District 11
Party	Candidate	Votes	%
Republican	Marci Mustello (incumbent)	29,484	87.02
Libertarian	Justin Konchar	4,397	12.98
Total votes		33,881	100.0
Republican hold			

PA House election, 2022: Pennsylvania House, District 11
Party	Candidate	Votes	%
Republican	Marci Mustello (incumbent)	Unopposed	
Total votes		23,579	100.00
Republican hold			

PA House election, 2020: Pennsylvania House, District 11
Party	Candidate	Votes	%
Republican	Marci Mustello (incumbent)	19,067	81.6
Democratic	Samuel Doctor	4,307	18.4
Total votes		23,374	100.0
Republican hold			

PA House special election, 2019: Pennsylvania House, District 11
Party	Candidate	Votes	%
Republican	Marci Mustello	5,953	57.49
Democratic	Samuel Doctor	4,402	42.51
Total votes		10,355	100.00
Republican hold			

PA House election, 2018: Pennsylvania House, District 11
Party	Candidate	Votes	%
Republican	Brian L. Ellis (incumbent)	16,079	76.5
Independent	Samuel Doctor	4,939	23.5
Total votes		21,018	100.0
Republican hold			

PA House election, 2016: Pennsylvania House, District 11
Party	Candidate	Votes	%
Republican	Brian L. Ellis (incumbent)	Unopposed	
Total votes		24,183	100.0
Republican hold			

PA House election, 2014: Pennsylvania House, District 11
Party	Candidate	Votes	%
Republican	Brian L. Ellis (incumbent)	Unopposed	
Total votes		14,290	100.0
Republican hold			

PA House election, 2012: Pennsylvania House, District 11
Party	Candidate	Votes	%
Republican	Brian L. Ellis (incumbent)	Unopposed	
Total votes		25,433	100.0
Republican hold			

PA House election, 2010: Pennsylvania House, District 11
Party	Candidate	Votes	%
Republican	Brian L. Ellis (incumbent)	Unopposed	
Total votes		17,331	100.0
Republican hold			
