= 2024 Pennsylvania House of Representatives election =

- November 5, 2024

All 203 seats in the Pennsylvania House of Representatives 102 seats needed for a majority
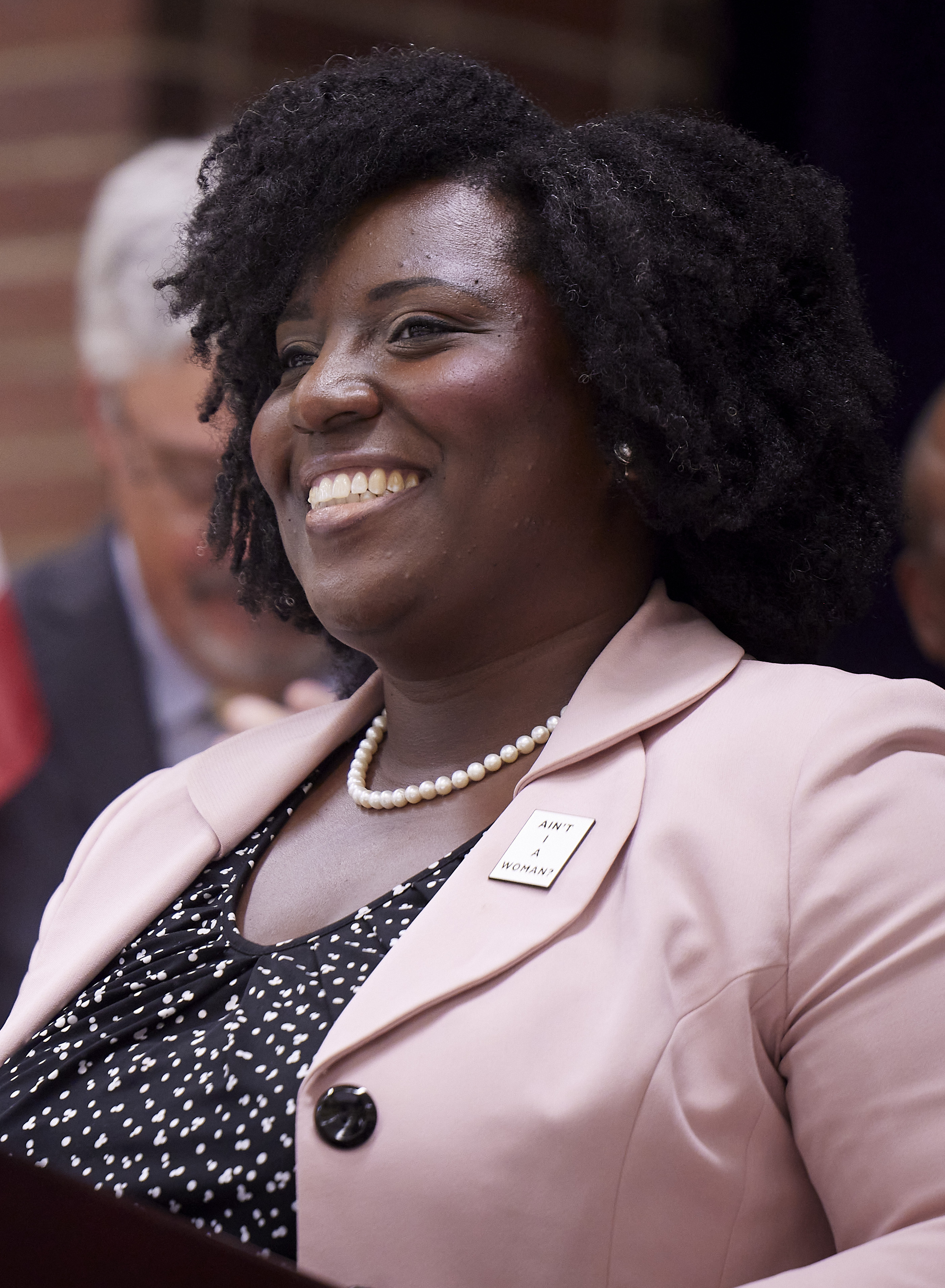

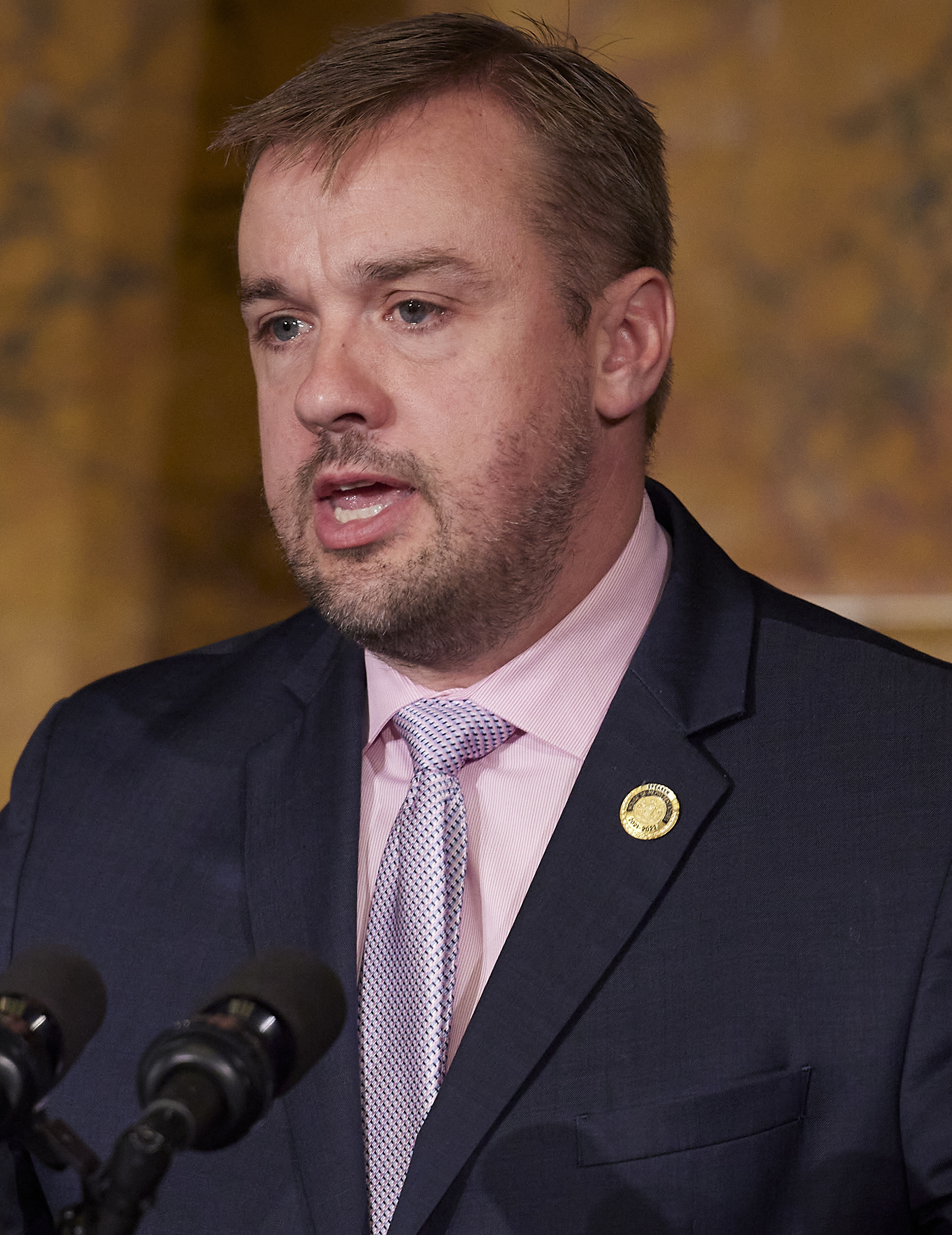
	Majority party	Minority party
Leader	Joanna McClinton	Bryan Cutler
Party	Democratic	Republican
Leader since	December 1, 2020	June 22, 2020
Leader's seat	191st	100th
Last election	102	101
Seats after	102	101
Seat change	Steady	Steady
Popular vote	2,971,731	3,319,275
Percentage	47.12%	52.63%
Swing	▲1.36%	▼0.83%
- Democratic hold Republican hold 50–60% 60–70% 70–80% 80–90% >90% 50–60% 60–70% 70–80% 80–90% >90%
Speaker before election
Joanna McClinton (Note: Democrat Mark Rozzi briefly served as speaker following the 2022 elections, but resigned the position for McClinton on February 28, 2023.)
Democratic
Elected Speaker
Joanna McClinton
Democratic

The 2024 elections for the Pennsylvania House of Representatives were held on November 5, 2024, with all districts up for election. The term of office for those elected in 2024 began when the House of Representatives convened in January 2025. Pennsylvania State Representatives are elected for two-year terms, with all 203 seats up for election every two years. The primary elections to choose the respective parties' nominees took place on April 23.

On February 7, 2023, the Democratic Party affirmed its first majority in the chamber since 2010 after winning three special elections. The 2024 elections saw no change in the partisan makeup of the House, with the Democrats maintaining a one-seat majority despite losing the popular vote.

== Special elections ==
=== 140th legislative district ===
Democrat John Galloway was elected magisterial district judge unopposed, succeeding District Judge Jan Vislosky upon her retirement. House Speaker Joanna McClinton scheduled a special election for February 13, 2024.

District 140 special election
Party	Candidate	Votes	%
Democratic	Jim Prokopiak	6,489	67.40
Republican	Candace Cabanas	3,083	32.02
Write-in		56	0.58
Total votes		9,597	100.00

Democratic nominee and Pennsbury School Board member Jim Prokopiak defeated Republican nominee Candace Cabanas of Falls Township.

=== 139th legislative district ===
Republican Joseph Adams resigned from the House on February 9, 2024. A special election was held on April 23. Sterling Township supervisor Jeffrey Olsommer, the Republican nominee, defeated former Pike County Area Agency on Aging chair Robin Skibber, the Democratic nominee.

District 139 special election
Party	Candidate	Votes	%
Republican	Jeffrey Olsommer	7,156	59.33
Democratic	Robin Skibber	4,715	39.09
Write-in		191	1.58
Total votes		12,062	100.00

=== 195th legislative district ===
Democrat Donna Bullock resigned on July 15. A special election was held on September 17. Democratic 28th Philadelphia Ward leader Keith Harris was the only candidate on the ballot.

=== 201st legislative district ===
Democrat Stephen Kinsey resigned on July 16. A special election was held on September 17. Democrat Andre Carroll was the only candidate on the ballot.

== Results summary ==
=== Retiring incumbents ===
==== Democrats ====
1. District 38: Nick Pisciottano retired to run for State Senate.
2. District 96: Mike Sturla withdrew after the primary election.
3. District 103: Patty Kim retired to run for State Senate.
4. District 126: Mark Rozzi retired.

==== Republicans ====
1. District 5: Barry Jozwiak retired.
2. District 14: Jim E. Marshall retired.
3. District 28: Rob Mercuri retired to run for U.S. House.
4. District 56: George Dunbar retired.
5. District 63: Donna Oberlander retired.
6. District 90: Paul Schemel retired.
7. District 92: Dawn Keefer retired to run for State Senate.
8. District 120: Aaron Kaufer retired.
9. District 187: Ryan Mackenzie retired to run for U.S. House.

=== Incumbents defeated in primary ===
==== Democrats ====
1. District 172: Kevin J. Boyle lost renomination to Sean Dougherty.

==== Republicans ====
1. District 80: Jim Gregory lost renomination to Scott Barger.
2. District 117: Mike Cabell lost renomination to Jamie Walsh.

== Primary elections ==
=== Democratic primary ===
2024 Pennsylvania House of Representatives elections Democratic Primary
District	Candidates	Votes	Percent
1	Pat Harkins	Unopposed	
2	Robert Merski	Unopposed	
3	Ryan Bizzarro	Unopposed	
4	Joseph Cancilla	Unopposed	
5	Heather Hanna	Unopposed	
6	Michael Walker	Unopposed	
7	No candidate filed for party.		
8	No candidate filed for party.		
9	No candidate filed for party.		
10	Amen Brown	2,991	40.10
10	Cass Green	2,947	39.51
10	Sajda Blackwell	1,496	20.06
11	No candidate filed for party.		
12	Robert Vigue	Unopposed	
13	Cristian Luna-Valente	Unopposed	
14	Kenya Johns	Unopposed	
15	Ashlee Anne Caul	Unopposed	
16	Robert Matzie	Unopposed	
17	No candidate filed for party.		
18	Anand Gunvant Patel	Unopposed	
19	Aerion Abney	Unopposed	
20	Emily Kinkead	Unopposed	
21	Lindsay Powell	Unopposed	
22	Joshua Siegel	Unopposed	
23	Dan Frankel	Unopposed	
24	La'Tasha Mayes	Unopposed	
25	Brandon Markosek	Unopposed	
26	Paul Friel	Unopposed	
27	Dan Deasy	Unopposed	
28	William Petulla	Unopposed	
29	Tim Brennan	Unopposed	
30	Arvind Venkat	Unopposed	
31	Perry Warren	Unopposed	
32	Joe McAndrew	6,803	70.40
32	Pauline Calabrese	2,836	29.35
33	Mandy Steele	Unopposed	
34	Abigail Salisbury	8,111	62.86
34	Ashley Comans	4,756	36.86
35	Matthew Gergely	Unopposed	
36	Jessica Benham	Unopposed	
37	John George	Unopposed	
38	John Inglis	3,182	34.43
38	Victoria Schmotzer	3,144	34.02
38	Anthony J. Olasz	2,885	31.22
39	Angela Girol	Unopposed	
40	Peter Kohnke (Note: Won as a write-in candidate)	860	63.19
41	Bradford Terrell Chambers	Unopposed	
42	Dan Miller	Unopposed	
43	No candidate filed for party.		
44	Hadley Haas	Unopposed	
45	Anita Kulik	Unopposed	
46	Alexander Taylor	Unopposed	
47	Edward Ritter	407	39.79
48	No candidate filed for party.		
49	Ismail Smith-Wade-El	Unopposed	
50	Stephanie Waggett	413	37.44
51	George Anthony Rattay	Unopposed	
52	No candidate filed for party.		
53	Steve Malagari	Unopposed	
54	Greg Scott	Unopposed	
55	Davon Magwood	354	53.56
56	No candidate filed for party.		
57	No candidate filed for party.		
58	Cherri Lynn Rogers	Unopposed	
59	Margaret A. Zelenak	Unopposed	
60	No candidate filed for party.		
61	Liz Hanbidge	Unopposed	
62	No candidate filed for party.		
63	Pat Ritchie	Unopposed	
64	No candidate filed for party.		
65	Erin Willman	508	76.51
66	No candidate filed for party.		
67	Rajeev N. Pradhan	Unopposed	
68	No candidate filed for party.		
69	No candidate filed for party.		
70	Matthew Bradford	Unopposed	
71	No candidate filed for party.		
72	Frank Burns	Unopposed	
73	No candidate filed for party.		
74	Dan K. Williams	Unopposed	
75	No candidate filed for party.		
76	Denise I. Maris	Unopposed	
77	Scott Conklin	Unopposed	
78	No candidate filed for party.		
79	No candidate filed for party.		
80	No candidate filed for party.		
81	Sean C. Steeg	Unopposed	
82	Paul Takac	Unopposed	
83	No candidate filed for party.		
84	No candidate filed for party.		
85	Nicholas Jacobson	Unopposed	
86	No candidate filed for party.		
87	John Patrick Flood Jr.	Unopposed	
88	Sara Agerton	Unopposed	
89	Noah Kreischer	Unopposed	
90	No candidate filed for party.		
91	No candidate filed for party.		
92	Daniel Almoney	Unopposed	
93	No candidate filed for party.		
94	No candidate filed for party.		
95	Carol Hill-Evans	Unopposed	
96	Mike Sturla	Unopposed	
97	Robert James Rudy	Unopposed	
98	Lynn McCleary	589	75.90
99	No candidate filed for party.		
100	No candidate filed for party.		
101	No candidate filed for party.		
102	No candidate filed for party.		
103	Nathan Davidson	2,114	29.62
103	Mercedes Evans	1,632	22.87
103	Tina Nixon	1,600	22.42
103	Jesse Monoski	1,291	18.09
103	Laura Harding	486	6.81
104	Dave Madsen	Unopposed	
105	Justin C. Fleming	Unopposed	
106	Anju Singh	441	42.49
107	No candidate filed for party.		
108	No candidate filed for party.		
109	Nicholas S. McGaw	Unopposed	
110	No candidate filed for party.		
111	No candidate filed for party.		
112	Kyle Mullins	Unopposed	
113	Kyle Donahue	Unopposed	
114	Bridget Malloy Kosierowski	Unopposed	
115	Maureen Madden	Unopposed	
116	Deborah L. Adoff	Unopposed	
117	No candidate filed for party.		
118	Jim Haddock	Unopposed	
119	Megan Kocher	Unopposed	
120	Fern Leard	3,449	58.80
120	John Morgan	2,319	39.53
121	Eddie Day Pashinski	Unopposed	
122	No candidate filed for party.		
123	Michael Zvalaren III	Unopposed	
124	Tina M. Burns	Unopposed	
125	Gene Stilp	Unopposed	
126	Jacklyn Rusnock	Unopposed	
127	Manny Guzman	Unopposed	
128	No candidate filed for party.		
129	Johanny Cepeda-Freytiz	Unopposed	
130	Rayne R. Reitnauer	Unopposed	
131	Meriam Sabih	4,171	72.24
131	Jay Santos	1,593	27.59
132	Michael Schlossberg	Unopposed	
133	Jeanne McNeill	Unopposed	
134	Peter Schweyer	Unopposed	
135	Steve Samuelson	Unopposed	
136	Robert L. Freeman	4,015	77.41
136	Taiba Sultana	1,167	22.50
137	Anna Thomas	Unopposed	
138	Jared Peter Bitting	Unopposed	
139	Robin Schooley Skibber	Unopposed	
140	Jim Prokopiak	Unopposed	
141	Tina Davis	Unopposed	
142	Anna Payne	Unopposed	
143	Eleanor Breslin	Unopposed	
144	Brian Munroe	Unopposed	
145	Vera Cole	Unopposed	
146	Joe Ciresi	Unopposed	
147	Albert Leach	Unopposed	
148	Mary Jo Daley	Unopposed	
149	Tim Briggs	Unopposed	
150	Joe Webster	Unopposed	
151	Melissa Cerrato	Unopposed	
152	Nancy Guenst	Unopposed	
153	Ben Sanchez	Unopposed	
154	Napoleon Nelson	Unopposed	
155	Danielle Friel Otten	Unopposed	
156	Chris Pielli	Unopposed	
157	Melissa Shusterman	Unopposed	
158	Christina Sappey	Unopposed	
159	Carol Kazeem	3,226	76.94
159	Darren A. Laws Sr.	958	22.85
160	Elizabeth Rhein Moro	Unopposed	
161	Leanne Krueger	Unopposed	
162	David Delloso	Unopposed	
163	Heather Boyd	Unopposed	
164	Gina Curry	Unopposed	
165	Jennifer O'Mara	Unopposed	
166	Greg Vitali	Unopposed	
167	Kristine Howard	Unopposed	
168	Lisa Borowski	Unopposed	
169	No candidate filed for party.		
170	No candidate filed for party.		
171	No candidate filed for party.		
172	Sean Dougherty	3,628	72.47
172	Kevin J. Boyle	1,347	26.91
173	Pat Gallagher	Unopposed	
174	Ed Neilson	Unopposed	
175	Mary Isaacson	Unopposed	
176	Hope E. Christman	Unopposed	
177	Joseph C. Hohenstein	Unopposed	
178	Emma Rosenthal	Unopposed	
179	Jason Dawkins	Unopposed	
180	Jose Giral	Unopposed	
181	Malcolm Kenyatta	3,837	73.63
181	Lewis Nash	870	16.70
181	Naderah Griffin	469	9.00
182	Ben Waxman	Unopposed	
183	Joseph William Lenzi	Unopposed	
184	Elizabeth Fiedler	Unopposed	
185	Regina Young	Unopposed	
186	Jordan A. Harris	Unopposed	
187	Stefanie Rafes	Unopposed	
188	Rick Krajewski	6,582	82.88
188	Tony Dphax King	1,289	16.23
189	Tarah Probst	Unopposed	
190	G. Roni Green	4,786	66.99
190	James Love Jackson	2,323	32.52
191	Joanna McClinton	Unopposed	
192	Morgan Cephas	Unopposed	
193	No candidate filed for party.		
194	Tarik Khan	Unopposed	
195	Donna Bullock	Unopposed	
196	No candidate filed for party.		
197	Danilo Burgos	Unopposed	
198	Darisha Parker	Unopposed	
199	Rick Christie	3,564	78.04
199	Montana Hartman	986	21.59
200	Chris Rabb	Unopposed	
201	Andre Carroll	Unopposed	
202	Jared Solomon	Unopposed	
203	Anthony A. Bellmon	Unopposed	

=== Republican primary ===
2024 Pennsylvania House of Representatives elections Republican Primary
District	Candidates	Votes	Percent
1	No candidate filed for party.		
2	Matthew L. Strupczewski	Unopposed	
3	Micah Goring	Unopposed	
4	Jake Banta	Unopposed	
5	Eric Weaknecht	Unopposed	
6	Brad Roae	Unopposed	
7	Parke Wentling	Unopposed	
8	Aaron Bernstine	Unopposed	
9	Marla Brown	Unopposed	
10	No candidate filed for party.		
11	Marci Mustello	5,274	63.06
11	Ryan Covert	3,080	36.82
12	Stephenie Scialabba	Unopposed	
13	John Lawrence	4,016	61.13
13	Carmela Ciliberti	2,532	38.52
14	Roman Kozak	Unopposed	
15	Josh Kail	Unopposed	
16	Michael J. Perich	Unopposed	
17	Tim Bonner	Unopposed	
18	K.C. Tomlinson	Unopposed	
19	No candidate filed for party.		
20	Matthew J. Kruth	Unopposed	
21	No candidate filed for party.		
22	No candidate filed for party.		
23	No candidate filed for party.		
24	No candidate filed for party.		
25	John D. Ritter	Unopposed	
26	Shawn Blickley	1,583	87.65
27	No candidate filed for party.		
28	Jeremy Shaffer	Unopposed	
29	Steven Mekanik	Unopposed	
30	Nathan J. Wolfe	Unopposed	
31	Bernie Sauer	1,738	74.43
32	Joe McAndrew	301	55.43
33	Gary William Lotz	Unopposed	
34	No candidate filed for party.		
35	No candidate filed for party.		
36	No candidate filed for party.		
37	Mindy Fee	Unopposed	
38	Stone Sobieralski	Unopposed	
39	Andrew Kuzma	Unopposed	
40	Natalie Mihalek	Unopposed	
41	Brett R. Miller	Unopposed	
42	Joseph Leckenby	632	68.25
43	Keith Greiner	Unopposed	
44	Valerie Gaydos	Unopposed	
45	James Julius	895	74.71
46	Jason Ortitay	Unopposed	
47	Joe D'Orsie	Unopposed	
48	Tim O'Neal	Unopposed	
49	No candidate filed for party.		
50	Bud Cook	3,920	62.05
50	Stephanie Waggett	2,367	37.47
51	Charity Grimm Krupa	Unopposed	
52	Ryan Warner	Unopposed	
53	Cheryl Bonavita-Cressman	Unopposed	
54	No candidate filed for party.		
55	Jill Cooper	6,034	78.08
55	Jamie Lingg	1,676	21.69
56	Brian Rasel	Unopposed	
57	Eric Nelson	Unopposed	
58	Eric Davanzo	Unopposed	
59	Leslie Rossi	Unopposed	
60	Abby Major	Unopposed	
61	Michelle L. Rupp	Unopposed	
62	James Struzzi	Unopposed	
63	Josh Bashline	3,143	32.49
63	Darlene Smail	2,551	26.37
63	Lisa Kerle	2,423	25.05
63	Clay Kennemuth	1,539	15.91
64	Lee James	Unopposed	
65	Kathy Rapp	Unopposed	
66	Brian Smith	Unopposed	
67	Martin Causer	Unopposed	
68	Clint Owlett	Unopposed	
69	Carl Walker Metzgar	Unopposed	
70	Ed Moye	1,533	65.77
71	James Rigby	Unopposed	
72	Amy Bradley	Unopposed	
73	Dallas Kephart	Unopposed	
74	Dale Hensel	Unopposed	
75	Michael Armanini	Unopposed	
76	Stephanie Borowicz	Unopposed	
77	Marie A. Librizzi	Unopposed	
78	Jesse Topper	Unopposed	
79	Louis Schmitt Jr.	Unopposed	
80	Scott Barger	5,945	53.96
80	Jim Gregory	5,056	45.89
81	Richard Irvin	Unopposed	
82	Therese J. Rohal-Hollen	Unopposed	
83	Jamie Flick	Unopposed	
84	Joseph D. Hamm	Unopposed	
85	David H. Rowe	Unopposed	
86	Perry A. Stambaugh	Unopposed	
87	Thomas Kutz	Unopposed	
88	Sheryl M. Delozier	Unopposed	
89	Rob Kauffman	Unopposed	
90	Chad Gerald Reichard	4,894	64.59
90	Janon R. Gray	2,666	35.19
91	Dan Moul	Unopposed	
92	Marc Anderson	3,627	36.42
92	Zachary Kile	3,113	31.26
92	Holly Kelley	1,535	15.41
92	Chris Wyatt	926	9.30
92	Matthew G. Davis	682	6.85
93	Mike Jones	Unopposed	
94	Wendy Fink	Unopposed	
95	Jasmine Rivera	Unopposed	
96	Eric Beezer	Unopposed	
97	Steven Mentzer	Unopposed	
98	Tom Jones	Unopposed	
99	David H. Zimmerman	Unopposed	
100	Bryan Cutler	5,029	53.51
100	Dave Nissley	4,362	46.41
101	John Schlegel	Unopposed	
102	Russ Diamond	5,782	64.97
102	Rachel Moyer	3,083	34.64
103	Cynthia P. Ward	Unopposed	
104	No candidate filed for party.		
105	No candidate filed for party.		
106	Tom Mehaffie	Unopposed	
107	Joanne Stehr	Unopposed	
108	Michael Stender	Unopposed	
109	Robert Leadbeter	6,385	82.29
109	Matt Yoder	1,347	17.36
110	Tina Pickett	6,700	86.83
110	Matthew Wayman	989	12.82
111	Jonathan Fritz	Unopposed	
112	No candidate filed for party.		
113	No candidate filed for party.		
114	No candidate filed for party.		
115	Matthew Joseph Long	Unopposed	
116	Dane Watro	Unopposed	
117	Jamie Walsh	4,735	49.89
117	Mike Cabell	4,731	49.84
118	McKayla Kathio	Unopposed	
119	Alec Ryncavage	Unopposed	
120	Brenda Pugh	3,972	62.56
120	Lee Ann McDermott	1,543	24.30
120	Patrick Musto	778	12.25
121	Dino Disler	651	39.74
122	Doyle Heffley	Unopposed	
123	Tim Twardzik	Unopposed	
124	Jamie Barton	Unopposed	
125	Joe Kerwin	Unopposed	
126	James Daniel Oswald	303	56.53
127	No candidate filed for party.		
128	Mark Gillen	Unopposed	
129	Susan G. Larkin	738	90.44
130	David Maloney	Unopposed	
131	Milou Mackenzie	Unopposed	
132	No candidate filed for party.		
133	No candidate filed for party.		
134	No candidate filed for party.		
135	No candidate filed for party.		
136	No candidate filed for party.		
137	Joe Emrick	Unopposed	
138	Ann Flood	Unopposed	
139	Jeff Olsommer	4,983	68.92
139	Matthew Contreras	2,203	30.47
140	Candace Cabanas	Unopposed	
141	Noah Jesse Boyd	Unopposed	
142	Joe Hogan	Unopposed	
143	Shelby Labs	Unopposed	
144	Daniel McPhillips	Unopposed	
145	Craig Staats	Unopposed	
146	Michael J. McCloskey III	Unopposed	
147	Donna Scheuren	Unopposed	
148	No candidate filed for party.		
149	No candidate filed for party.		
150	Simone H. Collins	Unopposed	
151	Allen Arthur Anderson	Unopposed	
152	Tim Bertman	739	67.86
153	Joseph J. Rooney	Unopposed	
154	Thom Estilow	427	71.64
155	Rodney Simon	Unopposed	
156	Kris Vollrath	Unopposed	
157	Regina Mauro	Unopposed	
158	Tina Louise Ayala	Unopposed	
159	No candidate filed for party.		
160	Craig Williams	Unopposed	
161	John Albert Mancinelli Jr.	Unopposed	
162	Gabriella M. Mendez	Unopposed	
163	Jeffrey O. Jones	784	58.25
164	No candidate filed for party.		
165	Elizabeth L. Piazza	Unopposed	
166	Kimberly C. Dugery	Unopposed	
167	Melissa C. Dicranian	Unopposed	
168	Kathryn M.L. Buckley	Unopposed	
169	Kate Klunk	Unopposed	
170	Martina White	Unopposed	
171	Kerry Benninghoff	Unopposed	
172	Aizaz Gill	1,863	65.16
172	Patrick Gushue	996	34.84
173	No candidate filed for party.		
174	No candidate filed for party.		
175	No candidate filed for party.		
176	Jack Rader	Unopposed	
177	No candidate filed for party.		
178	Kristin Marcell	Unopposed	
179	No candidate filed for party.		
180	No candidate filed for party.		
181	No candidate filed for party.		
182	No candidate filed for party.		
183	Zach Mako	5,233	70.35
183	Zach Halkias	2,187	29.40
184	No candidate filed for party.		
185	No candidate filed for party.		
186	No candidate filed for party.		
187	Gary Day	Unopposed	
188	No candidate filed for party.		
189	Lisa M. Vanwhy	Unopposed	
190	No candidate filed for party.		
191	No candidate filed for party.		
192	No candidate filed for party.		
193	Torren Ecker	Unopposed	
194	No candidate filed for party.		
195	No candidate filed for party.		
196	Seth Grove	Unopposed	
197	No candidate filed for party.		
198	No candidate filed for party.		
199	Barbara Gleim	Unopposed	
200	No candidate filed for party.		
201	No candidate filed for party.		
202	No candidate filed for party.		
203	No candidate filed for party.		

== General election ==
=== Predictions ===
Source	Ranking	As of
CNalysis	Tilt D	February 29, 2024

=== Overview ===
Affiliation	Candidates	Votes	Vote %	Seats Won
Republican	152	3,319,275	52.63	101
Democratic	158	2,971,731	47.12	102
Libertarian	4	12,017	0.19	0
Constitution	1	3,814	0.06	0
Total	315	6,306,837	100.00	203

=== Close races ===
Districts where the margin of victory was under 10%:

1. District 172, 1.97%
2. District 144, 2.66%
3. District 72, 2.83%
4. District 137, 3.32%
5. District 160, 3.6%
6. District 16, 4.64%
7. District 115, 6.9%
8. District 44, 7.6%
9. District 82, 7.6%
10. District 140, 8.06%
11. District 142, 9.63%

=== District breakdown ===
District	Party	Incumbent	Status	Party	Candidate	Votes	%
1	Democratic	Pat Harkins	Reelected	Democratic	Pat Harkins	19,327	100.00
2	Democratic	Robert Merski	Reelected	Democratic	Robert Merski	19,803	62.90
2	Democratic	Robert Merski	Reelected	Republican	Matt Strupczewski	11,639	36.97
3	Democratic	Ryan Bizzarro	Reelected	Democratic	Ryan Bizzarro	22,015	57.58
3	Democratic	Ryan Bizzarro	Reelected	Republican	Micah Goring	16,155	42.26
4	Republican	Jake Banta	Reelected	Republican	Jake Banta	22,686	67.54
4	Republican	Jake Banta	Reelected	Democratic	Joe Cancilla	10,845	32.29
5	Republican	Barry Jozwiak	Retired	Republican	Eric Weaknecht	23,664	66.72
5	Republican	Barry Jozwiak	Retired	Democratic	Heather Hanna	11,801	33.28
6	Republican	Brad Roae	Reelected	Republican	Brad Roae	22,802	69.96
6	Republican	Brad Roae	Reelected	Democratic	Michael Walker	9,790	30.04
7	Republican	Parke Wentling	Reelected	Republican	Parke Wentling	25,599	100.00
8	Republican	Aaron Bernstine	Reelected	Republican	Aaron Bernstine	33,825	100.00
9	Republican	Marla Brown	Reelected	Republican	Marla Brown	27,029	100.00
10	Democratic	Amen Brown	Reelected	Democratic	Amen Brown	22,919	100.00
11	Republican	Marci Mustello	Reelected	Republican	Marci Mustello	29,484	87.02
11	Republican	Marci Mustello	Reelected	Libertarian	Justin Konchar	4,397	12.98
12	Republican	Stephenie Scialabba	Reelected	Republican	Stephenie Scialabba	27,840	64.72
12	Republican	Stephenie Scialabba	Reelected	Democratic	Robert Vigue	15,103	35.11
13	Republican	John Lawrence	Reelected	Republican	John Lawrence	20,572	58.01
13	Republican	John Lawrence	Reelected	Democratic	Cristian Luna	14,891	41.99
14	Republican	Jim E. Marshall	Retired	Republican	Roman Kozak	24,270	66.47
14	Republican	Jim E. Marshall	Retired	Democratic	Kenya Johns	12,915	34.74
15	Republican	Josh Kail	Reelected	Republican	Josh Kail	24,769	68.89
15	Republican	Josh Kail	Reelected	Democratic	Ashlee Caul	11,185	31.11
16	Democratic	Robert Matzie	Reelected	Democratic	Robert Matzie	18,198	52.32
16	Democratic	Robert Matzie	Reelected	Republican	Michael J. Perich	16,584	47.68
17	Republican	Tim Bonner	Reelected	Republican	Tim Bonner	29,173	100.00
18	Republican	K.C. Tomlinson	Reelected	Republican	K.C. Tomlinson	18,161	55.52
18	Republican	K.C. Tomlinson	Reelected	Democratic	Anand Patel	14,469	44.24
19	Democratic	Aerion Abney	Reelected	Democratic	Aerion Abney	22,645	100.00
20	Democratic	Emily Kinkead	Reelected	Democratic	Emily Kinkead	21,322	59.12
20	Democratic	Emily Kinkead	Reelected	Republican	Matt Kruth	14,678	40.70
21	Democratic	Lindsay Powell	Reelected	Democratic	Lindsay Powell	29,301	100.00
22	Democratic	Joshua Siegel	Reelected	Democratic	Joshua Siegel	13,282	100.00
23	Democratic	Dan Frankel	Reelected	Democratic	Dan Frankel	29,844	100.00
24	Democratic	La'Tasha D. Mayes	Reelected	Democratic	La'Tasha D. Mayes	27,962	100.00
25	Democratic	Brandon Markosek	Reelected	Democratic	Brandon Markosek	20,865	59.50
25	Democratic	Brandon Markosek	Reelected	Republican	John Ritter	14,140	40.32
26	Democratic	Paul Friel	Reelected	Democratic	Paul Friel	22,421	57.35
26	Democratic	Paul Friel	Reelected	Republican	Shawn Blickley	16,675	42.65
27	Democratic	Dan Deasy	Reelected	Democratic	Dan Deasy	26,101	100.00
28	Republican	Rob Mercuri	Retired (Ran for U.S. House)	Republican	Jeremy Shaffer	23,228	56.96
28	Republican	Rob Mercuri	Retired (Ran for U.S. House)	Democratic	Bill Petulla	17,514	42.94
29	Democratic	Tim Brennan	Reelected	Democratic	Tim Brennan	25,176	55.56
29	Democratic	Tim Brennan	Reelected	Republican	Steve Mekanik	19,118	42.19
29	Democratic	Tim Brennan	Reelected	Libertarian	Rob Ronky	963	2.13
30	Democratic	Arvind Venkat	Reelected	Democratic	Arvind Venkat	21,896	54.26
30	Democratic	Arvind Venkat	Reelected	Republican	Nathan Wolfe	17,748	43.98
30	Democratic	Arvind Venkat	Reelected	Libertarian	William Johnson Baierl	676	1.68
31	Democratic	Perry Warren	Reelected	Democratic	Perry Warren	27,837	58.75
31	Democratic	Perry Warren	Reelected	Republican	Bernie Sauer	19,477	41.11
32	Democratic	Joe McAndrew	Reelected	Democratic/Republican (Note: Representative Joe McAndrew ran as a Democrat, but appeared on the ballot as both a Democrat and a Republican after also winning the Republican nomination via write-in votes.)	Joe McAndrew	31,207	100.00
33	Democratic	Mandy Steele	Reelected	Democratic	Mandy Steele	20,030	55.70
33	Democratic	Mandy Steele	Reelected	Republican	Gary Lotz	15,867	44.12
34	Democratic	Abigail Salisbury	Reelected	Democratic	Abigail Salisbury	30,209	100.00
35	Democratic	Matt Gergely	Reelected	Democratic	Matt Gergely	23,550	100.00
36	Democratic	Jessica Benham	Reelected	Democratic	Jessica Benham	22,253	77.83
36	Democratic	Jessica Benham	Reelected	Libertarian	Ross Sylvester	5,981	20.92
37	Republican	Mindy Fee	Reelected	Republican	Mindy Fee	26,131	66.70
37	Republican	Mindy Fee	Reelected	Democratic	John George	13,002	33.19
38	Democratic	Nick Pisciottano	Retired (Ran for State Senate)	Democratic	John Inglis	19,559	55.42
38	Democratic	Nick Pisciottano	Retired (Ran for State Senate)	Republican	Stone Sobieralski	15,675	44.42
39	Republican	Andrew Kuzma	Reelected	Republican	Andrew Kuzma	23,808	62.07
39	Republican	Andrew Kuzma	Reelected	Democratic	Angela Girol	14,546	37.93
40	Republican	Natalie Mihalek	Reelected	Republican	Natalie Mihalek	25,165	60.37
40	Republican	Natalie Mihalek	Reelected	Democratic	Peter Kohnke	16,518	39.63
41	Republican	Brett Miller	Reelected	Republican	Brett Miller	19,926	55.61
41	Republican	Brett Miller	Reelected	Democratic	Brad Chambers	15,870	44.29
42	Democratic	Dan Miller	Reelected	Democratic	Dan Miller	26,932	66.57
42	Democratic	Dan Miller	Reelected	Republican	Joseph Leckenby	13,436	33.21
43	Republican	Keith Greiner	Reelected	Republican	Keith Greiner	23,834	100.00
44	Republican	Valerie Gaydos	Reelected	Republican	Valerie Gaydos	20,811	53.75
44	Republican	Valerie Gaydos	Reelected	Democratic	Hadley Haas	17,872	46.15
45	Democratic	Anita Astorino Kulik	Reelected	Democratic	Anita Astorino Kulik	21,045	57.98
45	Democratic	Anita Astorino Kulik	Reelected	Republican	James Julius	15,192	41.86
46	Republican	Jason Ortitay	Reelected	Republican	Jason Ortitay	22,888	62.16
46	Republican	Jason Ortitay	Reelected	Democratic	Alex Taylor	13,931	37.94
47	Republican	Joe D'Orsie	Reelected	Republican	Joe D'Orsie	22,322	62.84
47	Republican	Joe D'Orsie	Reelected	Democratic	Edward Ritter	13,201	37.16
48	Republican	Tim O'Neal	Reelected	Republican	Tim O'Neal	24,213	100.00
49	Democratic	Ismail Smith-Wade-El	Reelected	Democratic	Ismail Smith-Wade-El	18,064	100.00
50	Republican	Bud Cook	Reelected	Republican	Bud Cook	20,424	69.11
50	Republican	Bud Cook	Reelected	Democratic	Drew Ross Manko (Note: Stephanie Waggett won the Democratic nomination via write-in votes, but withdrew from the race. Drew Ross Manko was selected to replace Waggett.)	9,131	30.89
51	Republican	Charity Grimm Krupa	Reelected	Republican	Charity Grimm Krupa	19,945	65.67
51	Republican	Charity Grimm Krupa	Reelected	Democratic	George Huck Rattay	10,425	34.33
52	Republican	Ryan Warner	Reelected	Republican	Ryan Warner	25,794	100.00
53	Democratic	Steve Malagari	Reelected	Democratic	Steve Malagari	21,057	60.22
53	Democratic	Steve Malagari	Reelected	Republican	Cheryl Bonavita	13,912	39.78
54	Democratic	Greg Scott	Reelected	Democratic	Greg Scott	18,584	69.67
54	Democratic	Greg Scott	Reelected	Republican	Martin Dickerson	8,092	30.33
55	Republican	Jill Cooper	Reelected	Republican	Jill Cooper	26,389	67.64
55	Republican	Jill Cooper	Reelected	Democratic	Davon Magwood	12,535	32.13
56	Republican	George Dunbar	Retired	Republican	Brian Rasel	32,092	100.00
57	Republican	Eric Nelson	Reelected	Republican	Eric Nelson	29,981	100.00
58	Republican	Eric Davanzo	Reelected	Republican	Eric Davanzo	25,276	69.07
58	Republican	Eric Davanzo	Reelected	Democratic	Cherri Rogers	11,258	30.76
59	Republican	Leslie Rossi	Reelected	Republican	Leslie Rossi	27,202	69.69
59	Republican	Leslie Rossi	Reelected	Democratic	Margie Zelenak	11,776	30.17
60	Republican	Abby Major	Reelected	Republican	Abby Major	27,276	100.00
61	Democratic	Liz Hanbidge	Reelected	Democratic	Liz Hanbidge	25,068	60.88
61	Democratic	Liz Hanbidge	Reelected	Republican	Michelle Rupp	16,109	39.12
62	Republican	James Struzzi	Reelected	Republican	James Struzzi	28,152	100.00
63	Republican	Donna Oberlander	Retired	Republican	Josh Bashline	27,017	80.03
63	Republican	Donna Oberlander	Retired	Democratic	Pat Ritchie	6,742	19.97
64	Republican	Lee James	Reelected	Republican	Lee James	25,456	86.97
64	Republican	Lee James	Reelected	Constitution	Ron Johnson	3,814	13.03
65	Republican	Kathy Rapp	Reelected	Republican	Kathy Rapp	23,145	72.96
65	Republican	Kathy Rapp	Reelected	Democratic	Erin Willman	8,577	27.04
66	Republican	Brian Smith	Reelected	Republican	Brian Smith	28,232	100.00
67	Republican	Martin Causer	Reelected	Republican	Martin Causer	25,135	81.91
67	Republican	Martin Causer	Reelected	Democratic	Rajeev Pradhan	5,551	18.09
68	Republican	Clint Owlett	Reelected	Republican	Clint Owlett	29,716	100.00
69	Republican	Carl Walker Metzgar	Reelected	Republican	Carl Walker Metzgar	32,670	100.00
70	Democratic	Matthew Bradford	Reelected	Democratic	Matthew Bradford	24,570	60.17
70	Democratic	Matthew Bradford	Reelected	Republican	Ed Moye	16,267	39.83
71	Republican	James Rigby	Reelected	Republican	James Rigby	30,204	100.00
72	Democratic	Frank Burns	Reelected	Democratic	Frank Burns	16,780	51.24
72	Democratic	Frank Burns	Reelected	Republican	Amy Bradley	15,851	48.41
73	Republican	Dallas Kephart	Reelected	Republican	Dallas Kephart	28,465	100.00
74	Democratic	Dan K. Williams	Reelected	Democratic	Dan K. Williams	17,667	55.05
74	Democratic	Dan K. Williams	Reelected	Republican	Dale Hensel	14,428	44.95
75	Republican	Michael Armanini	Reelected	Republican	Michael Armanini	30,415	100.00
76	Republican	Stephanie Borowicz	Reelected	Republican	Stephanie Borowicz	21,393	69.35
76	Republican	Stephanie Borowicz	Reelected	Democratic	Denise Maris	9,453	30.65
77	Democratic	Scott Conklin	Reelected	Democratic	Scott Conklin	18,548	61.36
77	Democratic	Scott Conklin	Reelected	Republican	Marie Librizzi	11,682	38.64
78	Republican	Jesse Topper	Reelected	Republican	Jesse Topper	31,152	100.00
79	Republican	Louis Schmitt Jr.	Reelected	Republican	Louis Schmitt Jr.	25,629	100.00
80	Republican	Jim Gregory	Lost primary	Republican	Scott Barger	30,518	100.00
81	Republican	Rich Irvin	Reelected	Republican	Rich Irvin	26,840	79.37
81	Republican	Rich Irvin	Reelected	Democratic	Sean Steeg	6,975	20.63
82	Democratic	Paul Takac	Reelected	Democratic	Paul Takac	16,558	53.80
82	Democratic	Paul Takac	Reelected	Republican	Therese Hollen	14,221	46.20
83	Republican	Jamie Flick	Reelected	Republican	Jamie Flick	23,285	100.00
84	Republican	Joe Hamm	Reelected	Republican	Joe Hamm	33,611	100.00
85	Republican	David H. Rowe	Reelected	Republican	David H. Rowe	24,977	71.83
85	Republican	David H. Rowe	Reelected	Democratic	Nick Jacobson	9,793	28.17
86	Republican	Perry A. Stambaugh	Reelected	Republican	Perry A. Stambaugh	29,341	100.00
87	Republican	Thomas Kutz	Reelected	Republican	Thomas Kutz	24,861	61.69
87	Republican	Thomas Kutz	Reelected	Democratic	John Flood	15,440	38.31
88	Republican	Sheryl M. Delozier	Reelected	Republican	Sheryl M. Delozier	20,882	55.15
88	Republican	Sheryl M. Delozier	Reelected	Democratic	Sara Agerton	16,983	44.85
89	Republican	Rob Kauffman	Reelected	Republican	Rob Kauffman	24,531	70.88
89	Republican	Rob Kauffman	Reelected	Democratic	Noah Kreischer	10,014	28.94
90	Republican	Paul Schemel	Retired	Republican	Chad Reichard	29,817	100.00
91	Republican	Dan Moul	Reelected	Republican	Dan Moul	30,080	100.00
92	Republican	Dawn Keefer	Retired (Ran for State Senate)	Republican	Marc Anderson	27,938	70.47
92	Republican	Dawn Keefer	Retired (Ran for State Senate)	Democratic	Dan Almoney	11,710	29.53
93	Republican	Mike Jones	Reelected	Republican	Mike Jones	29,780	100.00
94	Republican	Wendy Fink	Reelected	Republican	Wendy Fink	27,766	100.00
95	Democratic	Carol Hill-Evans	Reelected	Democratic	Carol Hill-Evans	12,812	59.14
95	Democratic	Carol Hill-Evans	Reelected	Republican	Jasmine Rivera	8,852	40.86
96	Democratic	Mike Sturla	Withdrew	Democratic	Nikki Rivera	21,244	60.22
96	Democratic	Mike Sturla	Withdrew	Republican	Eric Beezer	13,955	39.55
97	Republican	Steven Mentzer	Reelected	Republican	Steven Mentzer	23,846	61.73
97	Republican	Steven Mentzer	Reelected	Democratic	Bob Rudy	14,732	38.14
98	Republican	Tom Jones	Reelected	Republican	Tom Jones	24,706	64.41
98	Republican	Tom Jones	Reelected	Democratic	Lynn McCleary	13,650	35.59
99	Republican	David H. Zimmerman	Reelected	Republican	David H. Zimmerman	26,561	100.00
100	Republican	Bryan Cutler	Reelected	Republican	Bryan Cutler	23,316	100.00
101	Republican	John A. Schlegel	Reelected	Republican	John A. Schlegel	23,371	100.00
102	Republican	Russ Diamond	Reelected	Republican	Russ Diamond	27,886	100.00
103	Democratic	Patty Kim	Retired (Ran for State Senate)	Democratic	Nate Davidson	18,896	60.56
103	Democratic	Patty Kim	Retired (Ran for State Senate)	Republican	Cindi Ward	12,308	39.44
104	Democratic	Dave Madsen	Reelected	Democratic	Dave Madsen	19,066	100.00
105	Democratic	Justin C. Fleming	Reelected	Democratic	Justin C. Fleming	25,941	100.00
106	Republican	Tom Mehaffie	Reelected	Republican	Tom Mehaffie	23,615	62.84
106	Republican	Tom Mehaffie	Reelected	Democratic	Anju Singh	13,855	36.87
107	Republican	Joanne Stehr	Reelected	Republican	Joanne Stehr	28,129	100.00
108	Republican	Michael Stender	Reelected	Republican	Michael Stender	27,794	100.00
109	Republican	Robert Leadbeter	Reelected	Republican	Robert Leadbeter	21,605	67.21
109	Republican	Robert Leadbeter	Reelected	Democratic	Nick McGraw	10,540	32.79
110	Republican	Tina Pickett	Reelected	Republican	Tina Pickett	30,496	100.00
111	Republican	Jonathan Fritz	Reelected	Republican	Jonathan Fritz	31,528	100.00
112	Democratic	Kyle Mullins	Reelected	Democratic	Kyle Mullins	26,329	100.00
113	Democratic	Kyle Donahue	Reelected	Democratic	Kyle Donahue	19,389	100.00
114	Democratic	Bridget Malloy Kosierowski	Reelected	Democratic	Bridget Malloy Kosierowski	24,473	100.00
115	Democratic	Maureen Madden	Reelected	Democratic	Maureen Madden	15,955	53.45
115	Democratic	Maureen Madden	Reelected	Republican	Matt Long	13,894	46.55
116	Republican	Dane Watro	Reelected	Republican	Dane Watro	15,237	72.46
116	Republican	Dane Watro	Reelected	Democratic	Deborah Adoff	5,792	27.54
117	Republican	Mike Cabell	Lost Primary	Republican	Jamie Walsh	28,188	100.00
118	Democratic	Jim Haddock	Reelected	Democratic	Jim Haddock	19,801	56.24
118	Democratic	Jim Haddock	Reelected	Republican	McKayla Kathio	15,404	43.76
119	Republican	Alec Ryncavage	Reelected	Republican	Alec Ryncavage	18,031	62.93
119	Republican	Alec Ryncavage	Reelected	Democratic	Megan Kocher	10,623	37.07
120	Republican	Aaron Kaufer	Retired	Republican	Brenda Pugh	18,700	57.64
120	Republican	Aaron Kaufer	Retired	Democratic	Fern Leard	13,740	42.36
121	Democratic	Eddie Day Pashinski	Reelected	Democratic	Eddie Day Pashinski	11,692	55.28
121	Democratic	Eddie Day Pashinski	Reelected	Republican	Dino Disler	9,459	44.72
122	Republican	Doyle Heffley	Reelected	Republican	Doyle Heffley	28,006	100.00
123	Republican	Timothy Twardzik	Reelected	Republican	Timothy Twardzik	23,371	72.90
123	Republican	Timothy Twardzik	Reelected	Democratic	Michael Zvalaren	8,686	27.10
124	Republican	Jamie Barton	Reelected	Republican	Jamie Barton	24,236	71.71
124	Republican	Jamie Barton	Reelected	Democratic	Tina Burns	9,562	28.29
125	Republican	Joe Kerwin	Reelected	Republican	Joe Kerwin	26,612	68.30
125	Republican	Joe Kerwin	Reelected	Democratic	Gene Stilp	12,264	31.48
126	Democratic	Mark Rozzi	Retired	Democratic	Jacklyn Rusnock	14,005	55.89
126	Democratic	Mark Rozzi	Retired	Republican	James Oswald	11,052	44.11
127	Democratic	Manny Guzman Jr.	Reelected	Democratic	Manny Guzman Jr.	12,684	100.00
128	Republican	Mark M. Gillen	Reelected	Republican	Mark M. Gillen	28,117	100.00
129	Democratic	Johanny Cepeda-Freytiz	Reelected	Democratic	Johanny Cepeda-Freytiz	14,808	56.33
129	Democratic	Johanny Cepeda-Freytiz	Reelected	Republican	Susan Larkin	11,479	43.67
130	Republican	David Maloney	Reelected	Republican	David Maloney	24,320	65.60
130	Republican	David Maloney	Reelected	Democratic	Rayne Reitnauer	12,751	34.40
131	Republican	Milou Mackenzie	Reelected	Republican	Milou Mackenzie	23,514	57.23
131	Republican	Milou Mackenzie	Reelected	Democratic	Meriam Sabih	17,570	42.77
132	Democratic	Mike Schlossberg	Reelected	Democratic	Mike Schlossberg	26,659	100.00
133	Democratic	Jeanne McNeill	Reelected	Democratic	Jeanne McNeill	24,035	100.00
134	Democratic	Peter Schweyer	Reelected	Democratic	Peter Schweyer	19,124	100.00
135	Democratic	Steve Samuelson	Reelected	Democratic	Steve Samuelson	22,656	100.00
136	Democratic	Robert L. Freeman	Reelected	Democratic	Robert L. Freeman	19,607	100.00
137	Republican	Joe Emrick	Reelected	Republican	Joe Emrick	20,485	51.66
137	Republican	Joe Emrick	Reelected	Democratic	Anna Thomas	19,169	48.34
138	Republican	Ann Flood	Reelected	Republican	Ann Flood	25,791	65.23
138	Republican	Ann Flood	Reelected	Democratic	Jared Bitting	13,747	34.77
139	Republican	Jeffrey Olsommer	Reelected	Republican	Jeffrey Olsommer	26,234	67.38
139	Republican	Jeffrey Olsommer	Reelected	Democratic	Robin Schooley Skibber	12,701	32.62
140	Democratic	Jim Prokopiak	Reelected	Democratic	Jim Prokopiak	17,587	53.90
140	Democratic	Jim Prokopiak	Reelected	Republican	Candace Cabanas	14,958	45.84
141	Democratic	Tina Davis	Reelected	Democratic	Tina Davis	20,960	64.77
141	Democratic	Tina Davis	Reelected	Republican	Noah Boyd	11,345	35.06
142	Republican	Joe Hogan	Reelected	Republican	Joe Hogan	21,226	54.74
142	Republican	Joe Hogan	Reelected	Democratic	Anna Payne	17,492	45.11
143	Republican	Shelby Labs	Reelected	Republican	Shelby Labs	24,370	56.29
143	Republican	Shelby Labs	Reelected	Democratic	Eleanor Breslin	18,866	43.57
144	Democratic	Brian Munroe	Reelected	Democratic	Brian Munroe	20,553	51.23
144	Democratic	Brian Munroe	Reelected	Republican	Daniel J. McPhillips	19,488	48.57
145	Republican	Craig Staats	Reelected	Republican	Craig Staats	22,678	58.83
145	Republican	Craig Staats	Reelected	Democratic	Vera Cole	15,821	41.04
146	Democratic	Joe Ciresi	Reelected	Democratic	Joe Ciresi	20,726	59.29
146	Democratic	Joe Ciresi	Reelected	Republican	Michael J. McCloskey III	14,233	40.71
147	Republican	Donna Scheuren	Reelected	Republican	Donna Scheuren	23,792	58.56
147	Republican	Donna Scheuren	Reelected	Democratic	Albert Leach	16,835	41.44
148	Democratic	Mary Jo Daley	Reelected	Democratic	Mary Jo Daley	34,119	100.00
149	Democratic	Tim Briggs	Reelected	Democratic	Tim Briggs	30,339	100.00
150	Democratic	Joe Webster	Reelected	Democratic	Joe Webster	22,359	58.87
150	Democratic	Joe Webster	Reelected	Republican	Simone Collins	15,624	41.13
151	Democratic	Melissa Cerrato	Reelected	Democratic	Melissa Cerrato	24,975	61.44
151	Democratic	Melissa Cerrato	Reelected	Republican	Allen Arthur Anderson	15,672	38.56
152	Democratic	Nancy Guenst	Reelected	Democratic	Nancy Guenst	21,583	61.17
152	Democratic	Nancy Guenst	Reelected	Republican	Tim Bertman	13,699	38.83
153	Democratic	Ben Sanchez	Reelected	Democratic	Ben Sanchez	25,739	65.72
153	Democratic	Ben Sanchez	Reelected	Republican	Joseph J. Rooney	13,427	34.28
154	Democratic	Napoleon Nelson	Reelected	Democratic	Napoleon Nelson	31,179	80.30
154	Democratic	Napoleon Nelson	Reelected	Republican	Thom Estilow	7,648	19.70
155	Democratic	Danielle Friel Otten	Reelected	Democratic	Danielle Friel Otten	23,362	57.32
155	Democratic	Danielle Friel Otten	Reelected	Republican	Rodney Simon	17,396	42.68
156	Democratic	Chris Pielli	Reelected	Democratic	Chris Pielli	22,786	58.66
156	Democratic	Chris Pielli	Reelected	Republican	Kris R. Vollrath	16,059	41.34
157	Democratic	Melissa Shusterman	Reelected	Democratic	Melissa Shusterman	25,141	60.51
157	Democratic	Melissa Shusterman	Reelected	Republican	Regina Mauro	16,408	39.49
158	Democratic	Christina Sappey	Reelected	Democratic	Christina Sappey	22,052	57.98
158	Democratic	Christina Sappey	Reelected	Republican	Tina Ayala	15,983	42.02
159	Democratic	Carol Kazeem	Reelected	Democratic	Carol Kazeem	20,161	100.00
160	Republican	Craig Williams	Reelected	Republican	Craig Williams	21,834	51.80
160	Republican	Craig Williams	Reelected	Democratic	Elizabeth R. Moro	20,313	48.20
161	Democratic	Leanne Krueger	Reelected	Democratic	Leanne Krueger	22,393	58.20
161	Democratic	Leanne Krueger	Reelected	Republican	John Mancinelli Jr.	16,084	41.80
162	Democratic	David Delloso	Reelected	Democratic	David Delloso	19,815	56.68
162	Democratic	David Delloso	Reelected	Republican	Gabriella Mendez	15,143	43.32
163	Democratic	Heather Boyd	Reelected	Democratic	Heather Boyd	21,022	63.21
163	Democratic	Heather Boyd	Reelected	Republican	Jeffrey O. Jones	12,238	36.79
164	Democratic	Gina Curry	Reelected	Democratic	Gina Curry	21,017	100.00
165	Democratic	Jennifer O'Mara	Reelected	Democratic	Jennifer O'Mara	24,659	59.58
165	Democratic	Jennifer O'Mara	Reelected	Republican	Liz Piazza	16,730	40.42
166	Democratic	Greg Vitali	Reelected	Democratic	Greg Vitali	25,233	60.37
166	Democratic	Greg Vitali	Reelected	Republican	Kay Dugery	16,565	39.63
167	Democratic	Kristine Howard	Reelected	Democratic	Kristine Howard	23,301	58.57
167	Democratic	Kristine Howard	Reelected	Republican	Melissa Dicranian	16,484	41.43
168	Democratic	Lisa Borowski	Reelected	Democratic	Lisa Borowski	22,634	58.10
168	Democratic	Lisa Borowski	Reelected	Republican	Kathryn Buckley	16,326	41.90
169	Republican	Kate Klunk	Reelected	Republican	Kate Klunk	30,234	100.00
170	Republican	Martina White	Reelected	Republican	Martina White	19,768	100.00
171	Republican	Kerry Benninghoff	Reelected	Republican	Kerry Benninghoff	28,501	100.00
172	Democratic	Kevin J. Boyle	Lost Primary	Democratic	Sean Dougherty	12,836	50.94
172	Democratic	Kevin J. Boyle	Lost Primary	Republican	Aizaz Gill	12,340	48.97
173	Democratic	Patrick Gallagher	Reelected	Democratic	Pat Gallagher	13,374	100.00
174	Democratic	Ed Neilson	Reelected	Democratic	Ed Neilson	15,011	100.00
175	Democratic	Mary Isaacson	Reelected	Democratic	Mary Isaacson	29,976	100.00
176	Republican	Jack Rader	Reelected	Republican	Jack Rader	21,429	63.02
176	Republican	Jack Rader	Reelected	Democratic	Hope Christman	12,576	36.98
177	Democratic	Joseph C. Hohenstein	Reelected	Democratic	Joseph C. Hohenstein	17,234	100.00
178	Republican	Kristin Marcell	Reelected	Republican	Kristin Marcell	26,864	61.23
178	Republican	Kristin Marcell	Reelected	Democratic	Paul Lang Jr.	16,939	38.61
179	Democratic	Jason Dawkins	Reelected	Democratic	Jason Dawkins	14,583	100.00
180	Democratic	Jose Giral	Reelected	Democratic	Jose Giral	11,487	100.00
181	Democratic	Malcolm Kenyatta	Reelected	Democratic	Malcolm Kenyatta	23,165	100.00
182	Democratic	Ben Waxman	Reelected	Democratic	Ben Waxman	32,994	100.00
183	Republican	Zach Mako	Reelected	Republican	Zach Mako	25,688	65.55
183	Republican	Zach Mako	Reelected	Democratic	Joe Lenzi	13,503	34.45
184	Democratic	Elizabeth Fiedler	Reelected	Democratic	Elizabeth Fiedler	20,306	100.00
185	Democratic	Regina Young	Reelected	Democratic	Regina Young	19,366	100.00
186	Democratic	Jordan A. Harris	Reelected	Democratic	Jordan A. Harris	27,658	100.00
187	Republican	Ryan Mackenzie	Retired (Ran for U.S. House)	Republican	Gary Day	21,994	55.36
187	Republican	Ryan Mackenzie	Retired (Ran for U.S. House)	Democratic	Stefanie Rafes	17,738	44.64
188	Democratic	Rick Krajewski	Reelected	Democratic	Rick Krajewski	26,408	100.00
189	Democratic	Tarah Probst	Reelected	Democratic	Tarah Probst	16,970	57.50
189	Democratic	Tarah Probst	Reelected	Republican	Lisa VanWhy	12,542	42.50
190	Democratic	G. Roni Green	Reelected	Democratic	G. Roni Green	24,492	100.00
191	Democratic	Joanna E. McClinton	Reelected	Democratic	Joanna E. McClinton	23,939	100.00
192	Democratic	Morgan Cephas	Reelected	Democratic	Morgan Cephas	26,635	100.00
193	Republican	Torren Ecker	Reelected	Republican	Torren Ecker	27,826	100.00
194	Democratic	Tarik Khan	Reelected	Democratic	Tarik Khan	29,784	100.00
195	Democratic	Keith Harris	Reelected	Democratic	Keith Harris	26,653	100.00
196	Republican	Seth Grove	Reelected	Republican	Seth Grove	30,637	100.00
197	Democratic	Danilo Burgos	Reelected	Democratic	Danilo Burgos	16,952	100.00
198	Democratic	Darisha Parker	Reelected	Democratic	Darisha Parker	23,842	100.00
199	Republican	Barbara Gleim	Reelected	Republican	Barbara Gleim	20,935	60.89
199	Republican	Barbara Gleim	Reelected	Democratic	Rick Christie	13,447	39.11
200	Democratic	Chris Rabb	Reelected	Democratic	Chris Rabb	35,743	100.00
201	Democratic	Andre Carroll	Reelected	Democratic	Andre Carroll	26,154	100.00
202	Democratic	Jared Solomon	Reelected	Democratic	Jared Solomon	10,586	100.00
203	Democratic	Anthony A. Bellmon	Reelected	Democratic	Anthony A. Bellmon	17,389	100.00

== See also ==
- 2024 Pennsylvania elections
- Elections in Pennsylvania
- List of Pennsylvania state legislatures

== Sources ==
- "Election Summary Report Closed Primary Montgomery County April 23, 2024 Summary for: All Contests, All Districts, All Tabulators, All Counting Groups OFFICIAL RESULTS" (PDF). Montgomery County, Pennsylvania. May 8, 2024.
- "Election Summary Report General Election Armstrong County November 05, 2024 Summary for: All Contests, All Districts, All Tabulators, All Counting Groups 2024 General Election Official Results" (PDF). Armstrong County, Pennsylvania. November 25, 2024.
- "Election Summary Report General Election Montgomery County November 05, 2024 Summary for: All Contests, All Precincts, All Tabulators, All Counting Groups OFFICIAL RESULTS" (PDF). Montgomery County, Pennsylvania. November 25, 2024.
- "OFFICIAL COMPUTATIONS OF VOTES CAST DURING THE General Election November 5, 2024 All Election Results" (PDF). Crawford County, Pennsylvania. November 22, 2024.
- <"Summary Results Report General Election November 5, 2024 STATISTICS ADAMS COUNTY, PENNSYLVANIA" (PDF). Adams County, Pennsylvania. November 20, 2024.
- "Summary Results Report 2024 General Election November 5, 2024 Berks County" (PDF). Berks County, Pennsylvania. November 22, 2024.
- "Summary Results Report 2024 General Election November 5, 2024 Chester County". Chester County, Pennsylvania. December 2, 2024.
- "Summary Results Report 2024 GENERAL ELECTION November 5, 2024 Cumberland County". Cumberland County. November 19, 2024.
- "Summary Results Report 2024 General Election November 5, 2024 Indiana County" (PDF). Indiana County, Pennsylvania. November 18, 2024.
- "Summary Results Report 2024 General Primary April 23, 2024 OFFICIAL RESULTS Washington" (PDF). Washington County, Pennsylvania. May 6, 2024.
- "Summary Results Report 2024 General Primary April 23, 2024 OFFICIAL RESULTS Westmoreland". Westmoreland County, Pennsylvania. May 13, 2024.
- "Summary Results Report 2024 General Primary April 23, 2024 STATISTICS Berks County" (PDF). Berks County, Pennsylvania. May 13, 2024.
- "Summary Results Report 2024 General Primary Election April 23, 2024 OFFICIAL RESULTS Chester County". Chester County, Pennsylvania. May 10, 2024. p. 11.
- "Summary Results Report 2024 Presidential General November 5, 2024 STATISTICS UNOFFICIAL RESULTS All Precincts Reporting Butler County, PA". Butler County, Pennsylvania. November 14, 2024.
- "Summary Results Report 2024 Presidential Primary Election April 23, 2024 Lebanon County Official Results Lebanon County" (PDF). Lebanon County, Pennsylvania. May 2, 2024.
- "Summary Results Report 5 November 2024 General Election November 12, 2024 Schuylkill County" (PDF). Schuylkill County, Pennsylvania. November 12, 2024.
- "Summary Results Report Democratic 2024 General Primary April 23, 2024 Cumberland County". Cumberland County, Pennsylvania. April 30, 2024.
- "Summary Results Report GENERAL ELECTION Lackawanna County" (PDF). Lackawanna County, Pennsylvania. November 26, 2024.
- "Summary Results Report PRIMARY ELECTION April 23, 2024 Greene" (PDF). Greene County, Pennsylvania. May 13, 2024.
- "Wayne County, April 23, 2024 General Primary". Wayne County, Pennsylvania. May 8, 2024.
