= Pennsylvania House of Representatives, District 25 =

American legislative district

Pennsylvania's 25th State House of Representatives district
Representative
Brandon Markosek; D–Monroeville
- Population (2022): 64,844

The 25th Pennsylvania House of Representatives District is in southwestern Pennsylvania and has been represented by Brandon Markosek since 2019.

== District profile ==
The 25th District is located in Allegheny County and includes the following area:

- East McKeesport
- Monroeville
- North Versailles Township
- Pitcairn
- Plum
  - (part, Districts 04,05,06,08,09,10,11,12,13,14,15,16)
- Trafford (Allegheny County Portion)
- Turtle Creek
- Wall
- Wilmerding

== Representatives ==
Representative	Party	Years	District home	Note
Prior to 1969, seats were apportioned by county.
Paul F. Lutty	Democrat	1969 – 1972		
Lee C. Taddonio	Republican	1973 – 1982		
Joe Markosek	Democrat	1983 – 2019	Monroeville	
Brandon Markosek	Democrat	2019 – present	Monroeville	Incumbent

== Recent election results ==
PA House election, 2024: Pennsylvania House, District 25
Party	Candidate	Votes	%
Democratic	Brandon Markosek (incumbent)	20,830	59.59
Republican	John Ritter	14,127	40.41
Total votes		34,957	100.00
Democratic hold			

PA House election, 2022: Pennsylvania House, District 25
Party	Candidate	Votes	%
Democratic	Brandon Markosek (incumbent)	16,655	60.17
Republican	Stephen Schlauch	11,025	39.83
Total votes		27,680	100.00
Democratic hold			

PA House election, 2020: Pennsylvania House, District 25
Party	Candidate	Votes	%
Democratic	Brandon Markosek (incumbent)	19,461	58.32
Republican	John Ritter	13,908	41.68
Total votes		33,369	100.00
Democratic hold			

PA House election, 2018: Pennsylvania House, District 25
Party	Candidate	Votes	%
Democratic	Brandon Markosek	14,046	57.66
Republican	Stephen Schlauch	10,314	42.34
Total votes		24,360	100.00
Democratic hold			

PA House election, 2016: Pennsylvania House, District 25
Party	Candidate	Votes	%
Democratic	Joseph Markosek (incumbent)	19,218	62.41
Republican	John Ritter	11,573	37.59
Total votes		30,791	100.00
Democratic hold			

PA House election, 2014: Pennsylvania House, District 25
Party	Candidate	Votes	%
Democratic	Joseph Markosek (incumbent)	10,480	60.61
Republican	John Ritter	6,811	39.39
Total votes		17,291	100.00
Democratic hold			

PA House election, 2012: Pennsylvania House, District 25
Party	Candidate	Votes	%
Democratic	Joseph Markosek (incumbent)	16,297	54.75
Republican	Mike Doyle	13,470	45.25
Total votes		29,767	100.00
Democratic hold			

PA House election, 2010: Pennsylvania House, District 25
Party	Candidate	Votes	%
Democratic	Joseph Markosek (incumbent)	11,776	53.70
Republican	Mike Doyle	10,153	46.30
Total votes		21,929	100.00
Democratic hold			
