= Robert Kauffman =

Robert Kauffman, Rob Kauffman or Bob Kauffman is the name of:

- Bob Kauffman (1946–2015), American basketballer
- Rob Kauffman (politician) (born 1974), American politician elected to the Pennsylvania House of Representatives
- Rob Kauffman (businessman) (born 1964), American businessman, race team owner and sports car racing driver
