= Paul Lutty =

American politician

Paul F. Lutty

Member of the Pennsylvania House of Representatives from the 25th district
- In office 1969–1972
- Preceded by: District created
- Succeeded by: Lee Taddonio

Member of the Pennsylvania House of Representatives from the Allegheny County district
- In office 1951–1968

Personal details
- Born: June 30, 1917 Pittsburgh, Pennsylvania
- Died: October 3, 1988 (aged 71) Gibsonia, Pennsylvania
- Party: Democratic

Paul F. Lutty (June 30, 1917 – October 3, 1988) was a Democratic member of the Pennsylvania House of Representatives.
