= Bittle =

Bittle is a surname. Notable people with the surname include:

- Chris Bittle (born 1979), Canadian politician in Ontario
- Edgar Bittle (born 1943), American politician in Iowa
- Jerry Bittle (1949–2003), American cartoonist
- Nathan Bittle (born 2003), American basketball player
- R. Harry Bittle (born 1938), American politician in Pennsylvania
- Ryan Bittle (born 1976), American actor
