= Jesse White =

Jesse White may refer to:

- Jesse White (actor) (1917–1997), American film and television actor
- Jesse White (politician) (born 1934), American politician
- Jesse J. White (born 1978), American politician
- Jake Carter (wrestler) (Jesse Allen White, born 1986), American professional
- Jesse White (footballer) (born 1988), Australian rules footballer

== See also ==
- Jessie White Mario (1832–1906), British writer and philanthropist
- Jesco White (born 1956), American folk dancer and entertainer
- Jessica White (born 1984), American actress and model
