= Pennsylvania House of Representatives, District 1 =

American legislative district

Pennsylvania's 1st State House of Representatives district
Representative
Pat Harkins; D–Erie
- Population (2022): 65,227

The 1st Pennsylvania House of Representatives District is in northwestern Pennsylvania and has been represented by Pat Harkins since 2006.

== District profile ==
The 1st Pennsylvania House of Representatives District is located in Erie County, Pennsylvania and includes the following area:

- Erie (part)
  - Ward 01
  - Ward 02
  - Ward 03
  - Ward 04
  - Ward 06
- Lawrence Park Township

The district boundaries also include Pennsylvania's portion of Lake Erie.

== Representatives ==
Representative	Party	Years	Home	District boundaries
Before 1969, seats were apportioned by county.
Frank Polaski	Democrat	1969–1970; Defeated in primary election	Erie	Moved from the 2nd Erie County district. 1969–1972
Bernard Dombrowski	Democrat	1970–1990; Did not run for re-election	Erie	Moved from the 2nd Erie County district. 1969–1972
Bernard Dombrowski	Democrat	1970–1990; Did not run for re-election	Erie	1972–1982
Bernard Dombrowski	Democrat	1970–1990; Did not run for re-election	Erie	1982–1992
Kenneth Kruszewski	Democrat	1990–1992; Defeated in primary election	Erie	1982–1992
Linda Bebko-Jones	Democrat	1992–2006; Did not seek re-election	Erie	1992–2002
Linda Bebko-Jones	Democrat	1992–2006; Did not seek re-election	Erie	2002–2014; Erie County: Erie (part); Lawrence Park Township; Total population: 59,050
Pat Harkins	Democrat	2006–present	Erie	2002–2014; Erie County: Erie (part); Lawrence Park Township; Total population: 59,050
Pat Harkins	Democrat	2006–present	Erie	2014–2022; Erie County: Erie (part: Wards 01, 02, 05 [part: Divisions 01, 02, 03, 04, 05, 06, 07, 08, 09, 10, 12, 13, 15, 16, 17, 18 and 19], 06 [part: Divisions 02, 03 and 04]); Lawrence Park Township; Wesleyville; Total population: 60,428

== Recent election results ==
PA House election, 2024: Pennsylvania House, District 1
Party	Candidate	Votes	%
Democratic	Pat Harkins (incumbent)	Unopposed	
Total votes		18,869	100.00
Democratic hold			

PA House election, 2022: Pennsylvania House, District 1
Party	Candidate	Votes	%
Democratic	Pat Harkins (incumbent)	13,327	79.7
Libertarian	Michael G. Thomas	3,394	20.3
Total votes		16,721	100.00
Democratic hold			

PA House election, 2020: Pennsylvania House, District 1
Party	Candidate	Votes	%
Democratic	Pat Harkins (incumbent)	Unopposed	
Total votes		17,919	100.00
Democratic hold			

PA House election, 2018: Pennsylvania House, District 1
Party	Candidate	Votes	%
Democratic	Pat Harkins (incumbent)	Unopposed	
Total votes		13,019	100.00
Democratic hold			

PA House election, 2016: Pennsylvania House, District 1
Party	Candidate	Votes	%
Democratic	Pat Harkins (incumbent)	14,785	72.92
Republican	William Crotty	5,491	27.08
Total votes		20,276	100.00
Democratic hold			

PA House election, 2014: Pennsylvania House, District 1
Party	Candidate	Votes	%
Democratic	Pat Harkins (incumbent)	Unopposed	
Total votes		9,146	100.00
Democratic hold			

PA House election, 2012: Pennsylvania House, District 1
Party	Candidate	Votes	%
Democratic	Pat Harkins (incumbent)	Unopposed	
Total votes		16,970	100.00
Democratic hold			

PA House election, 2010: Pennsylvania House, District 1
Party	Candidate	Votes	%
Democratic	Pat Harkins (incumbent)	Unopposed	
Total votes		10,645	100.00
Democratic hold			
