= Bernard Dombrowski =

American politician

Bernard J. Dombrowski

Member of the Pennsylvania House of Representatives from the 1st district
- In office January 5, 1971 – November 30, 1990
- Preceded by: Frank Polaski
- Succeeded by: Kenneth Kruszewski

Personal details
- Born: May 11, 1929 Erie, Pennsylvania, U.S.
- Died: November 11, 1995 (aged 66) Erie, Pennsylvania, U.S.
- Party: Democratic

Military service
- Allegiance: United States
- Branch/service: United States Air Force
- Years of service: 1950–1953
- Rank: Sergeant

Bernard J. Dombrowski (May 11, 1929 – November 11, 1995) was a Democratic member of the Pennsylvania House of Representatives for Erie County's first district.

Dombrowski was born in the city of Erie, Erie County, on May 11, 1929. He attended the Technical Memorial High School before becoming a sergeant in the United States Air Force (1950–1953). He fought in the Korean War. Before entering politics, he worked at General Electric and the American Sterilizer Company.

He was first elected as a Democrat to the Pennsylvania House of Representatives in 1971, then serving 9 consecutive terms. While a legislator, he was elected Majority Caucus Administrator (1983–1990). Bernard Dombrowski was also appointed to the Legislative Budget and Finance Committee (1977–1980), and the Joint Legislative Air and Water Pollution Control and Conservation Committee (1981–1982, 1985–1990). Although he did not seek reelection to the House in 1990, he was a gubernatorial appointee for the Pennsylvania Historical and Museum Commission (1993–1995).

He died on November 11, 1995, in the city of Erie, and was interred at Calvary Cemetery, city of Erie, Erie County, Pennsylvania.

Political offices
Preceded by Frank Polaski	Member of the Pennsylvania House of Representatives for District 1; 1971–1990	Succeeded by Kenneth Kruszewski
