= John L. Brunner =

American politician

Member of the Pennsylvania House of Representatives from the 46th district
- In office 1969 – January 1, 1980
- Preceded by: District created
- Succeeded by: Victor Lescovitz

Member of the Pennsylvania House of Representatives from the Washington County district
- In office 1965–1968

Personal details
- Born: August 18, 1929 Langeloth, Pennsylvania
- Died: January 1, 1980 (aged 50) Washington County, Pennsylvania
- Party: Democratic

John L. Brunner (August 18, 1929 – January 1, 1980) was a Democratic member of the Pennsylvania House of Representatives.
