= Jess M. Stairs =

American politician

Member of the Pennsylvania House of Representatives from the 59th district
- In office January 4, 1977 – November 30, 2008
- Preceded by: Eugene G. Saloom
- Succeeded by: Mike Reese

Personal details
- Born: June 5, 1942 (age 84) Mount Pleasant, Pennsylvania
- Party: Republican
- Spouse: Joan Stairs
- Children: 2 children
- Education: Penn State University

Jess M. Stairs (born June 5, 1942) is an American politician who served as a Republican member of the Pennsylvania House of Representatives, representing the 59th District from 1977 to 2008.

== Biography ==
In 2002, Stairs was a candidate to replace John E. Barley as Majority Chair of the House Appropriations Committee, eventually losing to Dave Argall. In an open letter to the House Caucus announcing his candidacy, Stairs criticized Barley's dual positions as both chair of the House Republican Campaign Committee and chair of the Appropriations Committee. He expressed his desire to work with John Perzel, saying that "John Perzel is a city fellow and fights like an alley cat. I will join him as a country boy and fight like a barn cat."

He retired prior to the 2008 election, and was succeeded by Republican Mike Reese.

Stairs and his wife live in Acme, Pennsylvania and have two children.
