= Pennsylvania House of Representatives, District 78 =

American legislative district

Pennsylvania's 78th State House of Representatives district
Representative
Jesse Topper; R–Bedford
- Population (2022): 62,267

The 78th Pennsylvania House of Representatives District is located in south-central Pennsylvania and has been represented by Jesse Topper since 2014.

== District profile ==
The 78th District includes all of Bedford County, Pennsylvania and all of Fulton County, Pennsylvania.

== Representatives ==
Representative	Party	Years	District home	Note
Prior to 1969, seats were apportioned by county.
Percy G. Foor	Republican	1969 – 1974		
Clarence E. Dietz	Republican	1975 – 1986		
Dick Hess	Republican	1987 – 2013	Bedford	Died in office
Jesse Topper	Republican	2014 –	Bedford	Elected in special election

== Recent election results ==
PA House election, 2024: Pennsylvania House, District 78
Party	Candidate	Votes	%
Republican	Jesse Topper (incumbent)	Unopposed	
Total votes		31,152	100.00
Republican hold			

PA House election, 2022: Pennsylvania House, District 78
Party	Candidate	Votes	%
Republican	Jesse Topper (incumbent)	Unopposed	
Total votes		25,672	100.00
Republican hold			

PA House election, 2020: Pennsylvania House, District 78
Party	Candidate	Votes	%
Republican	Jesse Topper (incumbent)	Unopposed	
Total votes		31,550	100.00
Republican hold			

PA House election, 2018: Pennsylvania House, District 75
Party	Candidate	Votes	%
Republican	Jesse Topper (incumbent)	18,937	79.21
Democratic	Deb Baughman	4,971	20.79
Total votes		23,908	100.00
Republican hold			

PA House election, 2016: Pennsylvania House, District 78
Party	Candidate	Votes	%
Republican	Jesse Topper (incumbent)	Unopposed	
Total votes		26,565	100.00
Republican hold			
