= Victor Lescovitz =

American politician

Victor John Lescovitz

Member of the Pennsylvania House of Representatives from the 46th district
- In office April 8, 1980 – November 30, 2006
- Preceded by: John L. Brunner
- Succeeded by: Jesse J. White

Personal details
- Born: March 18, 1953 (age 73) Canonsburg, Pennsylvania
- Party: Democratic
- Spouse: Nancy

Victor John Lescovitz (born March 18, 1953) is a former Democratic member of the Pennsylvania House of Representatives.

He is a 1971 graduate of Fort Cherry High School. He earned a degree from Washington and Jefferson College in 1975 and a M.A. degree from the University of Pennsylvania in 1983.

He was first elected to represent the 46th legislative district in the Pennsylvania House of Representatives in a special election on March 11, 1980. He retired prior to the 2006 elections.

He is the longest serving State Representative in Washington County
