= Kenneth Kruszewski =

American politician

Kenneth E. Kruszewski

Member of the Pennsylvania House of Representatives from the 1st district
- In office January 1, 1991 – November 30, 1992
- Preceded by: Bernard J. Dombrowski
- Succeeded by: Linda Bebko-Jones

Personal details
- Born: February 6, 1948 (age 78) Erie, Pennsylvania, U.S.
- Party: Democratic

Kenneth E. Kruszewski (born February 6, 1948) is a former Democratic member of the Pennsylvania House of Representatives.

== Background ==
Born in the city of Erie, Pennsylvania on February 6, 1945, Kruszewski graduated from Technical Memorial High School in 1963, and attended, Pennsylvania State University, Behrend, and then also attended Mercyhurst College. Employers included the United States Justice Department and Drug Enforcement Administration, University of Delaware, Pennsylvania Chiefs Association (North West Regional Narcotics Instructor), Erie Police Department (19 years: Narcotics Commander, Detective Sergeant for 9 years).

== Political career ==
A Democrat, he was elected to the Pennsylvania House of Representatives in 1990. He then ran an unsuccessful candidate for reelection to the House in 1992.

Political offices
Preceded by Bernard Dombrowski	Member of the Pennsylvania House of Representatives for District 1; 1991–1992	Succeeded by Linda Bebko-Jones
