= Jesse Topper =

American politician (born 1981)

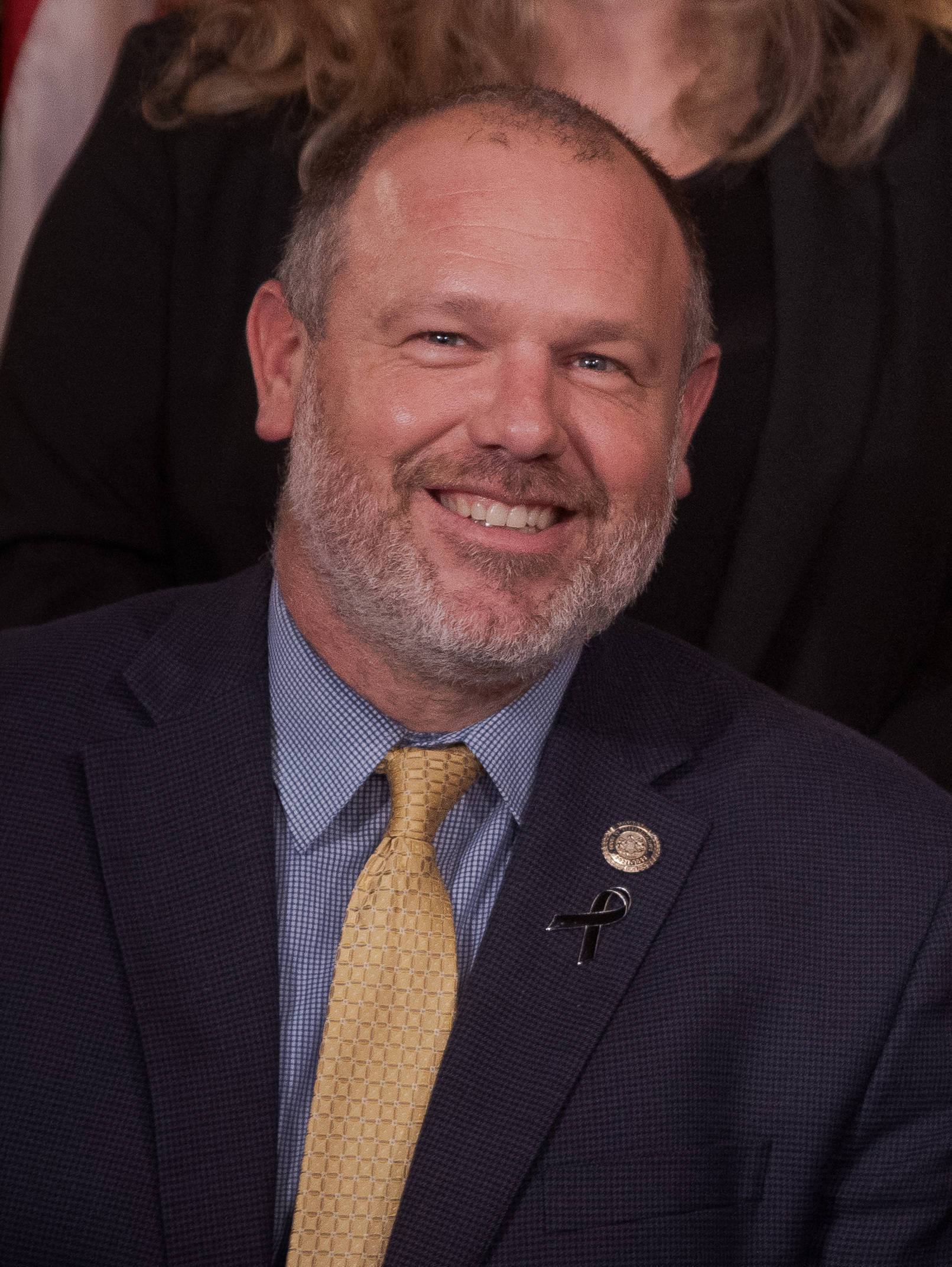
- Topper in November 2022

Minority Leader of the Pennsylvania House of Representatives
- Incumbent
- Assumed office January 7, 2025
- Preceded by: Bryan Cutler

Member of the Pennsylvania House of Representatives from the 78th district
- Incumbent
- Assumed office February 10, 2014
- Preceded by: Dick Hess

Personal details
- Born: Jesse Willis Topper; September 19, 1981 (age 44) Bedford, Pennsylvania, U.S.
- Party: Republican
- Spouse: Christy Smith (divorced)
- Children: 2
- Education: Frostburg State University (BA)
- Website: State House website Campaign website

Jesse Willis Topper (born September 19, 1981) is an American politician currently representing the 78th district in the Pennsylvania House of Representatives since 2014. A Republican, he is the minority leader of the state House.

== Early life and education ==
Topper was born on September 19, 1981, to John and Ruth Topper. He was home schooled and graduated from Frostburg State University magna cum laude with a bachelor of arts degree in music performance.

== Political career ==
Topper won a special election on January 28, 2014, to succeed state representative Dick Hess, who died during his term. He was reelected to four more consecutive terms. Prior to his election as a state representative, Topper served on the Bedford Borough Council for two years.

In November 2024, Topper was elected to serve as minority leader of the Republican caucus in the House for the 2025–2026 legislative session. Following the 2024 election, Topper stood as the Republican nominee for speaker of the house. Democrats won a one seat majority in the election, but Representative Matthew Gergely was absent from the vote due to a medical episode, leaving the chamber tied. Topper thus withdrew his name from consideration for speaker, allowing Joanna McClinton's reelection.

== Political positions ==
Topper is socially and fiscally conservative. He is also pro-life and a "strong supporter" of the Second Amendment. Topper opposes legalizing adult use cannabis in Pennsylvania.

== Personal life ==
Topper was married to Christy Smith and had two sons. The couple divorced in 2021. Topper previously served as a minister at a United Methodist Church in his hometown.

Pennsylvania House of Representatives
Preceded by Bryan Cutler	Minority Leader of the Pennsylvania House of Representatives; 2025–present	Incumbent
