= Jeffrey Coy =

American politician (1951–2018)

Jeffrey W. Coy

Member of the Pennsylvania House of Representatives from the 89th district
- In office January 4, 1983 – September 2, 2004
- Preceded by: R. Harry Bittle
- Succeeded by: Rob Kauffman

Personal details
- Born: October 6, 1951 Chambersburg, Pennsylvania, U.S.
- Died: June 4, 2018 (aged 66) Shippensburg, Pennsylvania, U.S.
- Party: Democratic

Jeffrey W. Coy (October 6, 1951 – June 4, 2018) was an American politician who was a member of the Pennsylvania Gaming Control Board and a former Democratic member of the Pennsylvania House of Representatives.

A 1969 graduate of Shippensburg Area Senior High School, Coy earned a degree from Shippensburg University in 1973, and served as a director for the Shippensburg-based Orrstown Bank.

Coy was first elected to represent the 89th legislative district in the Pennsylvania House of Representatives in 1982. He served as Democratic (Majority) Caucus Chairman from 1993 through 1994 as the majority party. In 1995, he was elected to serve as Democratic (Minority) Caucus Secretary. He was re-elected 11 times in a heavily Republican district.

Coy announced his intention not to seek re-election in early 2004. In August, Coy was nominated by the House Democratic leader Bill DeWeese to become a member of the Pennsylvania Gaming Control Board, a controversial nomination because of a provision of the Pennsylvania Constitution prohibiting legislators from serving on such boards "during the time for which he was elected". Senate Republicans interpreted the phrase to mean the entire two-year legislative term, which would expire on November 30, 2004, and suggested that the Democrats appoint a placeholder until the end of the legislative term. Coy's resignation from his seat would satisfy the constitution. Coy resigned his legislative seat effective September 2, 2004 and was appointed to the Pennsylvania Gaming Control Board effective the next day.

Coy died on June 4, 2018, aged 66.
