= Chad Reichard =

American politician

Member of the Pennsylvania House of Representatives from the 90th district
- Incumbent
- Assumed office December 1, 2024
- Preceded by: Paul Schemel

Personal details
- Born: Chambersburg, Pennsylvania, U.S.
- Party: Republican
- Education: American University; Pennsylvania State University
- Website: repreichard.com

Chad Reichard is an American politician that represents the 90th district of the Pennsylvania House of Representatives as a Republican since 2024.

== Biography ==
Reichard was born in Chambersburg, Pennsylvania. He is a graduate of Waynesboro Area Senior High School.
