= Pennsylvania House of Representatives, District 26 =

American legislative district

Pennsylvania's 26th State House of Representatives district
Representative
Paul Friel; D–East Vincent Township
- Population (2022): 64,162

The 26th Pennsylvania House of Representatives District is in southeastern Pennsylvania and has been represented by Democrat Paul Friel since 2023.

== District profile ==
The 26th Pennsylvania House of Representatives District is located in Chester County and includes the following areas:

- East Coventry Township
- East Nantmeal Township
- East Pikeland Township
- East Vincent Township
- Elverson
- North Coventry Township
- Phoenixville
- South Coventry Township
- Spring City
- Warwick Township
- West Nantmeal Township

== Representatives ==
Representative	Party	Years	District home	Note
Prior to 1969, seats were apportioned by county.
Charles N. Caputo	Democrat	1969 – 1978		
Michael M. Dawida	Democrat	1979 – 1982		Subsequently, represented the 36th district
District moved from Allegheny County to Chester County after 1982
Eugene G. Saloom	Democrat	1983 – 1992		Previously represented the 59th district
Tim Hennessey	Republican	1993 – 2022	North Coventry Township	
Paul Friel	Democrat	2023 – present	East Vincent Township	Incumbent

== Recent election results ==
PA House election, 2024: Pennsylvania House, District 26
Party	Candidate	Votes	%
Democratic	Paul Friel (incumbent)	22,421	57.35
Republican	Shawn Blickley	16,675	42.65
Total votes		39,096	100.00
Democratic hold			

PA House election, 2022: Pennsylvania House, District 26
Party	Candidate	Votes	%
Democratic	Paul Friel	17,853	57.01
Republican	Tim Hennessey (incumbent)	13,463	42.99
Total votes		31,316	100.00
Democratic gain from Republican			

PA House election, 2020: Pennsylvania House, District 26
Party	Candidate	Votes	%
Republican	Tim Hennessey (incumbent)	19,769	53.50
Democratic	Paul Friel	17,180	46.50
Total votes		36,949	100.00
Republican hold			

PA House election, 2018: Pennsylvania House, District 26
Party	Candidate	Votes	%
Republican	Tim Hennessey (incumbent)	14,290	52.79
Democratic	Pam Hacker	12,778	47.21
Total votes		27,068	100.00
Republican hold			

PA House election, 2016: Pennsylvania House, District 26
Party	Candidate	Votes	%
Republican	Tim Hennessey (incumbent)	Unopposed	
Total votes		22,635	100.00
Republican hold			

PA House election, 2014: Pennsylvania House, District 26
Party	Candidate	Votes	%
Republican	Tim Hennessey (incumbent)	Unopposed	
Total votes		12,870	100.00
Republican hold			

PA House election, 2012: Pennsylvania House, District 26
Party	Candidate	Votes	%
Republican	Tim Hennessey (incumbent)	18,058	56.27
Democratic	Mike Hays	14,033	43.73
Total votes		32,091	100.00
Republican hold			

PA House election, 2010: Pennsylvania House, District 26
Party	Candidate	Votes	%
Republican	Tim Hennessey (incumbent)	12,322	56.86
Democratic	Fern Kaufman	9,350	43.14
Total votes		21,672	100.00
Republican hold			
