= Paul Schemel =

American politician

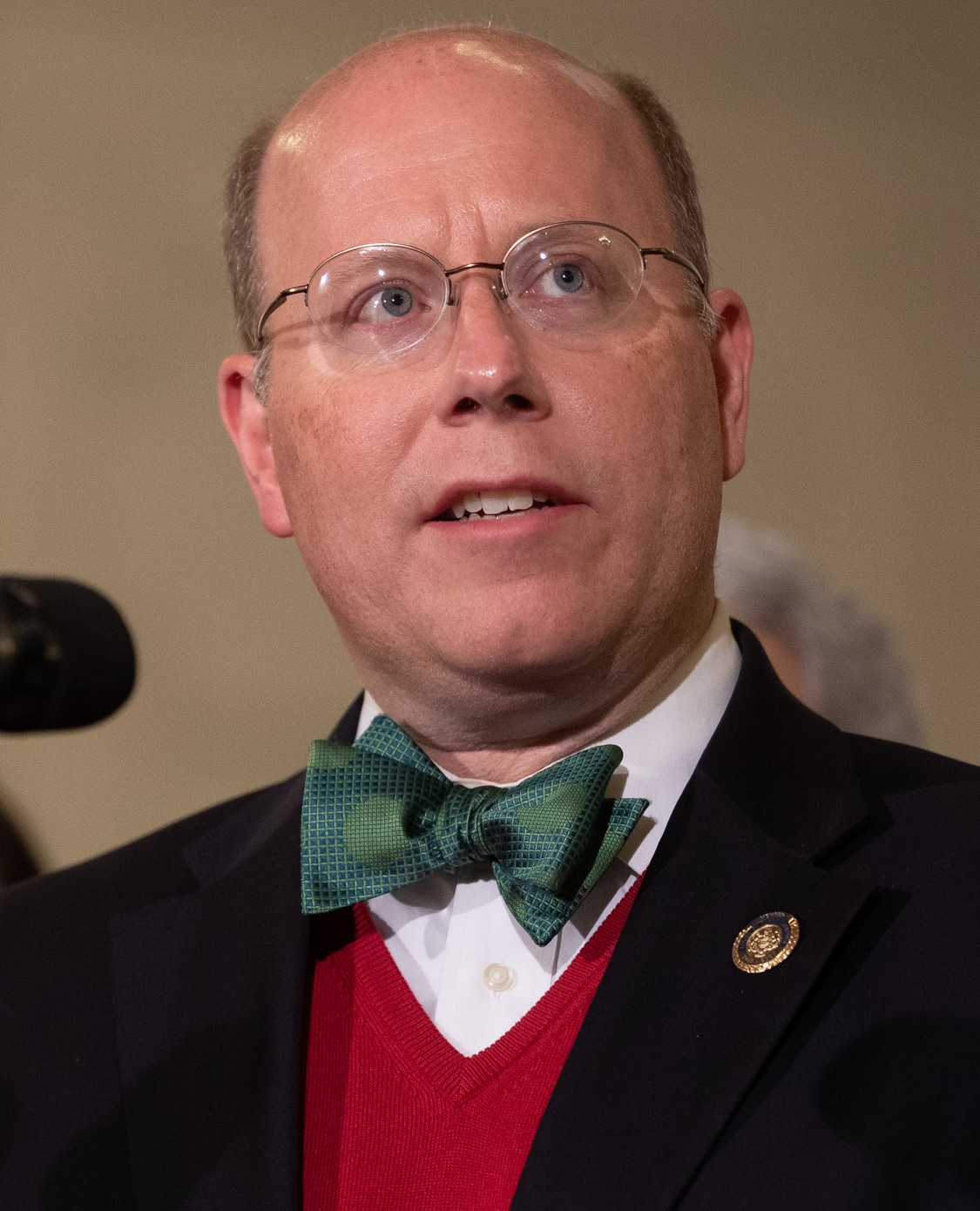

Member of the Pennsylvania House of Representatives from the 90th district
- In office January 6, 2015 – January 7, 2025
- Preceded by: Todd Rock
- Succeeded by: Chad Reichard

Personal details
- Born: November 6, 1971 (age 54) Buffalo, New York, U.S.
- Party: Republican
- Spouse: Lucy
- Children: 6
- Education: University of Dallas (BA); Regent University (JD)
- Occupation: Attorney

Paul Thomas Schemel (born November 6, 1971) is an American lawyer and former politician who was a member of the Pennsylvania House of Representatives from the 90th district in Franklin County, Pennsylvania.

== Early life and education ==
Schemel was born in Buffalo, New York on November 6, 1971. He graduated from Southside High School in 1990. At the University of Dallas, he obtained a Bachelor of Arts in philosophy in 1994 and an MBA in contract management in 1996. He obtained a JD from Regent University in 1999.

== Career ==
Schemel has worked as an attorney and was an advisor on local government for Iraq at the United States Department of State. His first role in elected office was as a councilor in Greencastle, Pennsylvania, a position he held for six years before being elected to the Pennsylvania House of Representatives in 2014.

Schemel opposed the legalization of cannabis in Pennsylvania. Schemel was the only member of the Pennsylvania House to oppose two bills strengthening laws against child sexual abuse. He explained his sole nay vote stemmed over concern for rights of the person accused of child sexual abuse. After the 2020 United States presidential election, Schemel was one of 26 Pennsylvania House Republicans who called for withdrawing certification of presidential electors.

Schemel sat on the Environmental Resources & Energy, Health, Judiciary, and State Government committees.

Rep. Schemel made an unsuccessful attempt at becoming minority leader of the Pennsylvania House of Representatives in 2022.

Schemel declined to run for reelection in 2024. He was a member of the Pennsylvania Freedom Caucus.
