= Joseph Markosek =

American politician

Joseph F. Markosek

Member of the Pennsylvania House of Representatives from the 25th district
- In office January 4, 1983 – November 30, 2018
- Preceded by: Lee Taddonio
- Succeeded by: Brandon Markosek

Personal details
- Born: January 27, 1950 (age 76) Pittsburgh, Pennsylvania, U.S.
- Party: Democratic
- Education: University of Notre Dame
- Occupation: Legislator
- Website: www.hacd.net

Joseph F. Markosek (born January 27, 1950) is an American politician who served as a member of the Pennsylvania House of Representatives for the 25th district from 1983 to 2021. In February 2018, Markosek announced his retirement and endorsed his son, Brandon, to replace him.

== Early life and education ==
Markosek was born in Pittsburgh. He graduated from the University of Notre Dame in 1972.

== Career ==
Before taking office in 1983, Markosek worked with Westinghouse Electric Corporation as a buyer of nuclear components. He was sent to Three Mile Island immediately following the nuclear accident in 1979 as part of the repair/recovery team.

=== Pennsylvania House ===
==== House Appropriations Committee ====
Markosek served as the Democratic chairman of the House Appropriations Committee. The committee was composed of 37 members. The committee conducts budget hearings each spring to review and evaluate the governor’s executive budget proposal. It also meets regularly while the House is in session to evaluate legislative proposals for fiscal implications prior to moving a bill forward in the legislative process.

==== House Transportation Committee ====
Previously, Markosek served as Democratic chairman of the House Transportation Committee. His leadership led to the passage of Act 44 of 2007, Pennsylvania’s major transportation funding mechanism, which has provided more than $2 billion in additional transportation funding for Pennsylvania. Markosek also advocated for the widening of the Route 22 corridor in the Murrysville region of his legislative district.

==== Legislative initiatives ====
Throughout Markosek’s career, he worked to services services for Pennsylvania’s citizens with developmental disabilities, particularly those with autism spectrum disorders. He also led special committees to investigate issues such as auto theft and problems faced by older drivers. While Markosek was pleased the legislature enacted a texting ban to help make our roads safer, he continued to work to enact comprehensive distracted driving legislation.
