= Pennsylvania House of Representatives, District 46 =

American legislative district

Pennsylvania's 46th State House of Representatives district
Representative
Jason Ortitay; R–Cecil Township
- Population (2022): 66,666

The 46th Pennsylvania House of Representatives District is located in southwest Pennsylvania and has been represented by Jason Ortitay since 2015.

== District Profile ==
The 46th Pennsylvania House of Representatives District is located in Allegheny County and Washington County and includes the following areas:

Allegheny County

- McDonald (Allegheny County Portion)
- Oakdale
- South Fayette Township

Washington County

- Canonsburg
- Cecil Township
- Chartiers Township
- Houston
- McDonald (Washington County Portion)
- Mount Pleasant Township
- North Strabane Township (part)
  - District 06
  - District 07
  - District 08
  - District 09

== Representatives ==
Representative	Party	Years	District home	Note
Prior to 1969, seats were apportioned by county.
John L. Brunner	Democrat	1969 – 1980		Died on January 1, 1980
Victor John Lescovitz	Democrat	1980 – 2006		Elected on March 11, 1980 to fill vacancy
Jesse J. White	Democrat	2007 – 2014	Cecil Township	
Jason Ortitay	Republican	2015 – present	Cecil Township	Incumbent

== Recent election results ==
PA House election, 2024: Pennsylvania House, District 46
Party	Candidate	Votes	%
Republican	Jason Ortitay (incumbent)	22,888	62.16
Democratic	Alex Taylor	13,931	37.84
Total votes		36,819	100.00
Republican hold			

PA House election, 2022: Pennsylvania House, District 46
Party	Candidate	Votes	%
Republican	Jason Ortitay (incumbent)	Unopposed	
Total votes		21,777	100.00
Republican hold			

PA House election, 2020: Pennsylvania House, District 46
Party	Candidate	Votes	%
Republican	Jason Ortitay (incumbent)	25,271	62.41
Democratic	Byron Timmins	15,224	37.59
Total votes		40,495	100.00
Republican hold			

PA House election, 2018: Pennsylvania House, District 46
Party	Candidate	Votes	%
Republican	Jason Ortitay (incumbent)	15,786	55.66
Democratic	Byron Timmins	12,577	44.34
Total votes		28,363	100.00
Republican hold			

PA House election, 2016: Pennsylvania House, District 46
Party	Candidate	Votes	%
Republican	Jason Ortitay (incumbent)	20,056	60.24
Democratic	Joseph Szpara	13,238	39.76
Total votes		33,294	100.00
Republican hold			
