= William Shuman =

American politician (1921-1978)

William O. Shuman

Member of the Pennsylvania House of Representatives from the 90th district
- In office 1969 – August 30, 1978
- Preceded by: District created
- Succeeded by: Terry L. Punt

Member of the Pennsylvania House of Representatives from the Franklin County district
- In office 1965–1968

Personal details
- Born: July 23, 1921 Antrim Township, Pennsylvania
- Died: August 30, 1978 (aged 57) Miami, Florida
- Party: Democratic

William O. Shuman (July 23, 1921 – August 30, 1978) is a former Democratic member of the Pennsylvania House of Representatives. He graduated from Greencastle-Antrim High School.
