= Todd Rock =

American politician

Todd A. Rock

Member of the Pennsylvania House of Representatives from the 90th district
- In office January 2, 2007 – January 6, 2015
- Preceded by: Patrick E. Fleagle
- Succeeded by: Paul Schemel

Personal details
- Born: 1963 (age 62–63) Chambersburg, Pennsylvania, U.S.
- Party: Republican
- Spouse: Nancy Rock
- Children: 2
- Website: www.reprock.com

Todd A. Rock (born 1963) is a Republican former member of the Pennsylvania House of Representatives for the 90th legislative district from 2006 until 2015.

Rock, a teacher at the Franklin County Career and Technology Center, entered the race for state representative having been motivated by the 2005 legislative pay raise. In the Republican primary election, Rock defeated 18-term incumbent Patrick Fleagle by 111 votes. Fleagle was able to get on the ballot by defeating Rock 339-336 as a write-in for the Democratic ballot, setting up a rematch of the two rivals in the fall. In the general election, Rock defeated Fleagle with 54% of the vote.

In 2014, Rock declined to run for reelection.
