= Patrick Fleagle =

American politician

Patrick Elvin Fleagle

Member of the Pennsylvania House of Representatives from the 90th district
- In office January 3, 1989 – November 30, 2006
- Preceded by: Terry Punt
- Succeeded by: Todd Rock

Personal details
- Born: March 21, 1951 (age 75) Waynesboro, Pennsylvania
- Party: Republican
- Spouse: Jane
- Education: Juniata College

Patrick Elvin Fleagle (born March 22, 1951) is a former Republican member of the Pennsylvania House of Representatives. He represented the 90th legislative district from 1989 until 2006.

Fleagle graduated from Waynesboro Area Senior High School in 1969 and from Juniata College in 1973.

Fleagle's opponent in the 2006 Republican primary, Todd Rock, entered the race because of Fleagle's support for the 2005 legislative pay raise. Rock defeated Fleagle by 111 votes in the primary. Fleagle was able to get on the ballot by defeating Rock 339-336 as a write-in for the Democratic ballot, setting up a rematch of the two rivals in the fall. In the general election, Rock defeated Fleagle with 54% of the vote.

== Electoral history ==
Pennsylvania House of Representatives, 90th district
Year	Republican	Votes	Pct	Democrat	Votes	Pct
2006	Todd Rock	11,614	54.0	Patrick Fleagle	9,895	46.0
2004	Patrick Fleagle	24,449	100.0			
2002	Patrick Fleagle	13,802	100.0			
2000	Patrick Fleagle	19,284	100.0			
