= Frank Polaski =

American politician

Member of the Pennsylvania House of Representatives from the 1st district
- In office January 7, 1969 – November 30, 1970
- Preceded by: District created
- Succeeded by: Bernard Dombrowski

Member of the Pennsylvania House of Representatives from the 2nd Erie County district
- In office January 5, 1965 – November 30, 1968
- Preceded by: Julian Polaski
- Succeeded by: District dissolved

Personal details
- Born: December 19, 1904 Erie, Pennsylvania, U.S.
- Died: July 1, 1996 (aged 91) Erie, Pennsylvania, U.S.
- Party: Democratic
- Spouse: Rose
- Children: Antoinette, Sandra, Michael, Thomas
- Education: University of Michigan (B.A. 1929); Northwestern University School of Law (J.D. 1933)

Military service
- Allegiance: United States
- Branch/service: United States Army Air Forces
- Years of service: 1942–1945
- Rank: Staff Sergeant

Frank Polaski (December 19, 1904 – July 1, 1996) was a Democratic member of the Pennsylvania House of Representatives.

== Early life and education ==
He graduated from the University of Michigan with a Bachelor of Arts in 1929 and Northwestern University School of Law with a Juris Doctor in 1933. He served in the United States Army Air Forces from April 1942 to October 1945 and became a staff sergeant.

== Career ==
He was first elected in 1964, bringing a keen awareness of the needs of working people and of the environment to his legislative responsibilities. He introduced the first legislation to protect the waters of Pennsylvania and to provide funds to clean up existing water pollution. He introduced and enacted legislation for economic development in the State and the Erie area during a time of economic restructuring. He initiated legislation supporting public housing and measures upgrading facilities of Edinboro State College and Behrend Campus of Pennsylvania State University. He sponsored legislation supporting civil rights, student loans and scholarships, consumers' rights, and Vietnam War veterans' bonuses and was among the first in the Pennsylvania legislature to advocate using dedicated resources from the Pennsylvania Lottery to support programs and services to senior citizens. After his retirement he was active with the Emmaus Soup Kitchen and the Second Harvest Food Bank of Northwest Pennsylvania.

He is buried at Trinity Cemetery, Erie, Pennsylvania.

Political offices
Preceded by	Member of the Pennsylvania House of Representatives for District 1; 1967–1970	Succeeded by Bernard Dombrowski
