= Pennsylvania House of Representatives, District 89 =

American legislative district

Pennsylvania's 89th State House of Representatives district
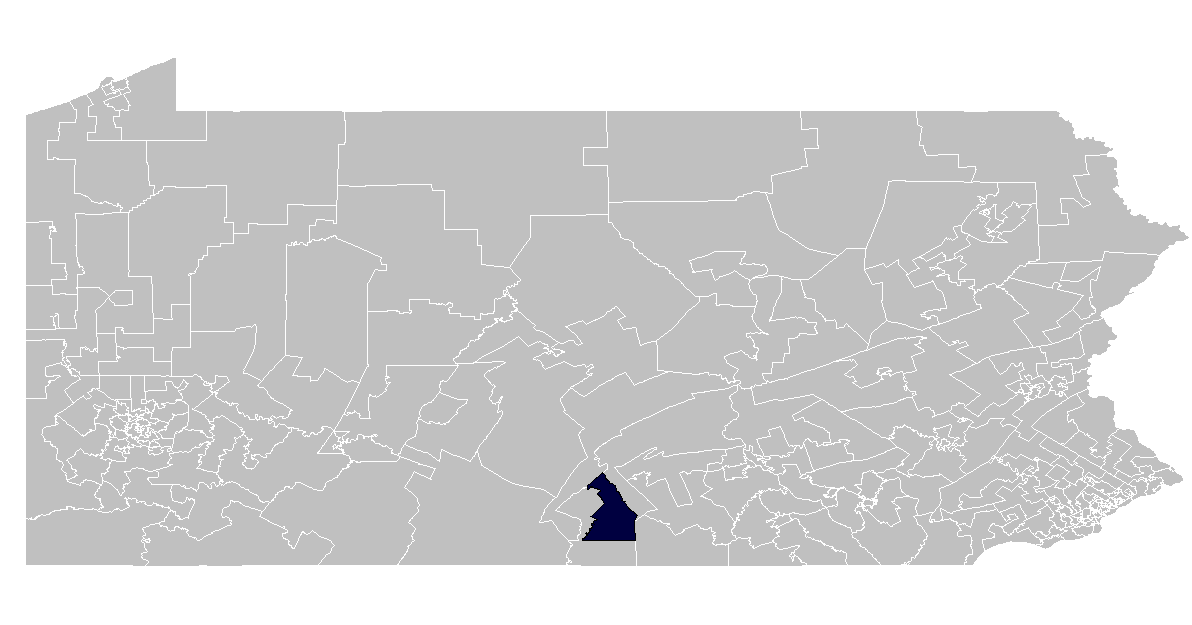
Representative
Rob Kauffman; R–Greene Township, Franklin County
- Population (2022): 66,531

The 89th Pennsylvania House of Representatives District is located in South Central Pennsylvania and has been represented by Rob Kauffman since 2005.

In the Commonwealth's 2024 State Legislative election, Kauffman won re-election against the Democratic nominee, 22-year-old Walmart employee Noah Kreischer.

== District profile ==
The 89th District is located in Franklin County and includes the following areas:

- Chambersburg
- Greene Township
- Guilford Township
- Hamilton Township

== Representatives ==
Representative	Party	Years	District home	Note
Prior to 1969, seats were apportioned by county.
R. Harry Bittle	Republican	1969 – 1982		
Jeffrey W. Coy	Democrat	1983 – 2004		
Rob Kauffman	Republican	2005 – present	Scotland, Greene Township	Incumbent

== Recent election results ==
PA House election, 2022: Pennsylvania House of Representatives, District 89
Party	Candidate	Votes	%
Republican	Rob Kauffman	Unopposed	
Total votes		21,928	100.00
Republican hold			
