= Dick Hess =

American politician

Dick Lee Hess

Member of the Pennsylvania House of Representatives from the 78th district
- In office January 6, 1987 – September 6, 2013
- Preceded by: Clarence E. Dietz
- Succeeded by: Jesse Topper

Personal details
- Born: September 12, 1938 Pittsburgh, Pennsylvania
- Died: September 6, 2013 (aged 74) Pittsburgh, Pennsylvania
- Party: Republican
- Spouse: Shirley L. Hess
- Website: www.dickhess.com

Dick Lee Hess (September 12, 1938 – September 6, 2013) was a Republican member of the Pennsylvania House of Representatives for the 78th District and was elected in 1986. He was also the Republican chairman of the House Transportation Committee. Hess served until his death on September 6, 2013.

== Career ==
Prior to being elected to the General Assembly in 1986, Hess served for 15 years as Bedford County’s Prothonotary and Clerk of Courts. He began his career in public service in 1964 as chief clerk to the Bedford County Commissioners, a position he held for seven and a half years.

== Personal ==
When not in Harrisburg, Hess was active in his district as a member of the Bedford County Memorial Hospital Board of Trustees, the University of Pittsburgh-Johnstown Advisory Board, Bedford United Methodist Church Finance Committee, and the Broad Top Home Nursing Advisory Board.

A 1958 graduate of Saxton Liberty High School, Hess resided in Bedford with his wife of 48 years. The couple has one son, Jeff, daughter in law Lizette and three grandchildren, Erika, Zachary and Haden.

Hess died on September 6, 2013, from complications following leg surgery.
