= Eugene Saloom =

American politician (1934–2022)

Eugene G. Saloom

Member of the Pennsylvania House of Representatives from the 59th district
- In office January 7, 1969 – November 30, 1976
- Preceded by: District created
- Succeeded by: Jess Stairs

Member of the Pennsylvania House of Representatives from the 26th district
- In office January 4, 1983 – November 30, 1992
- Preceded by: Michael Dawida
- Succeeded by: Tim Hennessey

Member of the Pennsylvania House of Representatives from the Westmoreland County district
- In office January 2, 1967 – November 30, 1968

Personal details
- Born: September 22, 1934 Mount Pleasant, Pennsylvania, U.S.
- Died: May 15, 2022 (aged 87) Somerset, Pennsylvania, U.S.
- Party: Democrat (changed in 1975)
- Spouse: Nancy Newill
- Profession: Funeral director

Eugene G. Saloom (September 22, 1934 – May 15, 2022) was an American politician who served as a Democratic member of the Pennsylvania House of Representatives for the 26th District. Prior to that, he represented the 59th District in southeastern Pennsylvania.

== Formative years ==
Born in Mount Pleasant, Pennsylvania on September 22, 1934, Saloom operated a funeral home in Mount Pleasant, Pennsylvania from 1960 through 2004.

== Public service career ==
A member of the Mount Pleasant School Board during the early days of his public service career, Saloom was subsequently elected to Pennsylvania House of Representatives, where he represented the 59th District in southeastern Pennsylvania and then the 26th District.

During his tenure, he served as the House Liquor Control Committee Chairman and was a staunch advocate for raising the speed limit to sixty-five miles-per-hour on the Pennsylvania Turnpike.

Saloom ran unsuccessfully in the Democratic primary for the House of Representatives in 1992.

== Death ==
Saloom died from heart failure on May 15, 2022 at a hospital in Somerset, Pennsylvania.
