= Linda Bebko-Jones =

American politician

Member of the Pennsylvania House of Representatives from the 1st district
- In office January 5, 1993 – November 30, 2006
- Preceded by: Kenneth E. Kruszewski
- Succeeded by: Patrick J. Harkins

Personal details
- Born: May 1, 1946 Erie, Pennsylvania, U.S.
- Died: November 20, 2011 (aged 65) Erie, Pennsylvania, U.S.
- Party: Democratic
- Spouse: Tom Jones (d. 2001)

Linda Bebko-Jones (May 1, 1946 – November 20, 2011) was an American politician who represented the 1st district of the Pennsylvania House of Representatives, which includes portions of Erie County.

== Personal ==
Linda Bebko was born in Erie, Pennsylvania, and graduated from Villa Maria Academy in 1964. She attended the Erie Business Academy from 1964 to 1965. Prior to elective office, she spent time working as an alcohol and drug counselor and said that she had been an alcoholic herself in the past. Later on, she was director of Women Against Sexual Harassment from 1989 to 1992 and a caseworker for Community House for Women from 1990 to 1991. Her career in politics began with a stint as an administrative assistant for Pennsylvania State Senator A. Buzz Andrezeski from 1984 to 1989, moving on to become a caseworker for former United States Senator Harris Wofford in 1990. Her husband, Tom Jones, died in 2001 after a bout with throat and neck cancer. She died on November 20, 2011, aged 65.

== Political career ==
=== Early career ===
Bebko-Jones was first elected to represent the 1st District in the Pennsylvania House of Representatives in 1992, defeating freshman incumbent Ken Kruszewski in the Democratic primary. She went on to defeat Republican Jerry Knight, an aide to Rep. Phil English, in the general election by 1,100 votes. Bebko-Jones easily won the 1994 election by over 5,000 votes over Jerry Podolsky. In 1996 and 2000, she ran unopposed for re-election and in 1998, she won after her GOP opponent quit the race and tried to withdraw from the ballot.

=== 2004 election ===
In the 2004 Democratic primary election, Bebko-Jones faced Jim Herdzik. His challenge came on the heels of a scandal involving a fire in her district office. Immediately after the fire, there were reports that it has been caused by Bebko-Jones leaving a lit cigarette in the office. The fire marshal never conclusively determined the cause, only that it was accidental. After the repairs were made to the office, Bebko-Jones moved out prior to lease expiration, claiming that the air inside the building was unhealthy. Eventually, her landlord agreed to a settlement with the state at the taxpayer's expense. Herdzik even rented the former office as a campaign headquarters, highlighting the incident. On election day, Bebko-Jones won easily with 60% of the vote.

=== Campaign for Erie Mayor ===
In 2005, she ran for mayor of Erie against incumbent Rick Filippi, who had been indicted on corruption charges. Bebko-Jones ultimately finished third in the race, behind Joseph Sinnott who went on to become mayor.

== Retirement and indictment ==
Bebko-Jones was forced to withdraw from the 2006 Democratic primary when questions arose over the propriety of her nomination petitions. Pat Harkins won the primary and went on to win the general election.

In November 2007, a statewide grand jury was convened to investigate abnormalities in Bebko-Jone's nominating petitions for the 2006 Democratic primary. On February 28, 2007, Pennsylvania Attorney General Tom Corbett charged Bebko-Jones and her former chief-of-staff with forging nominating petitions and submitting the fraudulent forms to the Secretary of the Commonwealth.

On August 6, 2008, Bebko-Jones and her former chief of staff Mary B. Fiolek each pleaded guilty to the misdemeanor charges of forging and submitting false signatures and criminal conspiracy. Jones was ordered to perform 200 hours of community service and Fiolek 100 hours.

In 2007, it was revealed that Bebko-Jones, as a lame duck legislator, attended legislative training trips at the public's expense after her defeat.

Political offices
Preceded by Kenneth Kruszewski	Member of the Pennsylvania House of Representatives for District 1; 1993–2006	Succeeded by Pat Harkins
