= Percy Foor =

American politician

Percy G. Foor

Member of the Pennsylvania House of Representatives from the 78th district
- In office 1969–1974
- Preceded by: District created
- Succeeded by: Clarence Dietz

Member of the Pennsylvania House of Representatives from the Bedford County district
- In office 1961–1968

Personal details
- Born: April 12, 1913 East Providence Township, Bedford County, Pennsylvania
- Died: September 13, 1990 (aged 77) Everett, Pennsylvania
- Party: Republican

Percy G. Foor (April 12, 1913 – September 13, 1990) was a Republican member of the Pennsylvania House of Representatives. He was born in Bedford County in 1913.

== Formative years ==
Born on April 12, 1913, in Everett, Pennsylvania, Percy Foor was a son of Albert F. and Jennie Foor. A graduate of Everett High School, he grew up to become a realtor and the owner-operator of the Percy G. Foor Lumber Company.

== Political career ==
A Republican, Foor was elected to, and served for ten years on, the board of directors of the Everett Southern Joint School District. Elected as justice of the peace in Everett in 1956, he served in that capacity until 1960.

Foor was then elected to the Pennsylvania House of Representatives in 1961. Representing the 78th District, he served constituents in Bedford, Fulton and Huntingdon counties for seven consecutive terms. Appointed to the Local Government Commission in 1967, he chaired that commission from 1969 to 1970 and from 1973 to 1974. He then completed his service with the commission in 1974.

== Illness, death and interment ==
Foor died in a palliative care hospital on September 13, 1990, and was interred at the Everett Cemetery in Everett, Pennsylvania.
