= Clarence Dietz =

American politician

Clarence E. Dietz

Member of the Pennsylvania House of Representatives from the 78th district
- In office 1975–1986
- Preceded by: Percy Foor
- Succeeded by: Dick Hess

Personal details
- Born: April 17, 1919 Turtle Creek, Pennsylvania
- Died: June 23, 1993 (aged 74) Bedford County, Pennsylvania
- Party: Republican

Clarence E. Dietz (April 17, 1919 – June 23, 1993) was a former Republican member of the Pennsylvania House of Representatives. He was born in 1919 to Clarence and Mary Elizabeth Dietz.

He died in 1993 at his Bedford County home after a short illness.
