= Mike Reese (Pennsylvania politician) =

American politician (1978–2021)

Member of the Pennsylvania House of Representatives from the 59th district
- In office January 6, 2009 – January 2, 2021
- Preceded by: Jess M. Stairs
- Succeeded by: Leslie Rossi

Personal details
- Born: March 7, 1978 Mount Pleasant Township, Pennsylvania, U.S.
- Died: January 2, 2021 (aged 42) Greensburg, Pennsylvania, U.S.
- Party: Republican
- Education: Duquesne University
- Website: Official website

Michael P. Reese (March 7, 1978 – January 2, 2021) was an American politician. A Republican, he served as a member of the Pennsylvania House of Representatives from 2009 until his death in 2021. Reese was secretary of the Pennsylvania House Republican Caucus for the 2019–2020 session, and had been elected to serve as caucus chairman in 2021.

== Career ==
Prior to his election to the House, Reese worked in the admissions office of the University of Pittsburgh at Greensburg. He also worked at Westmoreland County Community College, serving as a faculty member of the business division. Just before his first term as a state representative, Reese was the Westmoreland County Assistant Director of Financial Administration. He served as secretary of the Pennsylvania House Republican Caucus for the 2019–2020 session and had been elected to serve as caucus chairman in 2021 prior to his death.

== Personal life and death ==
Michael Reese was born on March 7, 1978, in Mount Pleasant Township and graduated from Mount Pleasant Area High School. He went on to Duquesne University, where he graduated with a bachelor's degree in secondary education with a concentration in history. Reese earned a master's in business administration from Seton Hill University in 2004.

Reese was diagnosed with COVID-19 in December 2020, during the COVID-19 pandemic in Pennsylvania. He died from a suspected brain aneurysm at a hospital in Greensburg, Pennsylvania, on January 2, 2021, at age 42.
