= Pennsylvania House of Representatives, District 59 =

American legislative district

Pennsylvania's 59th State House of Representatives district
Representative
Leslie Rossi; R–Unity Township
- Population (2022): 66,601

The 59th Pennsylvania House of Representatives District is located in southwest Pennsylvania and has been represented by Leslie Rossi since 2021.

== District Profile ==
The 59th District is located in Westmoreland County and includes the following areas:

- Bolivar
- Cook Township
- Derry
- Derry Township (part)
  - District Bradenville
  - District Cokeville
  - District Cooperstown
  - District Kingston
  - District Loyalhanna
  - District Millwood
  - District New Derry
  - District Peanut
  - District Saxman
  - District Scalp Level
  - District Torrance
- Donegal
- Donegal Township
- Fairfield Township
- Latrobe
- Laurel Mountain
- Ligonier
- Ligonier Township
- Mount Pleasant Township (part)
  - District Laurel Run
  - District Mammoth
  - District Pleasant Valley
  - District Ridgeview
  - District United
  - District Westmoreland
- New Florence
- Seward
- St. Clair Township
- Unity Township
- Youngstown

== Representatives ==
Representative	Party	Years	District home	Note
Prior to 1969, seats were apportioned by county.
Eugene G. Saloom	Republican	1969 – 1974		
Eugene G. Saloom	Democrat	1975 – 1976		Switched to Democratic Party; Later represented 26th district
Jess M. Stairs	Republican	1977 – 2008	Acme	Retired
Mike Reese	Republican	2009 – 2021	Mount Pleasant Township	Died in office.
Leslie Rossi	Republican	2021 – present	Unity Township	Incumbent. Elected on May 18, 2021, to fill vacancy

== Recent election results ==
PA House election, 2024: Pennsylvania House, District 59
Party	Candidate	Votes	%
Republican	Leslie Rossi (incumbent)	27,202	69.79
Democratic	Margie Zelenak	11,776	30.21
Total votes		38,978	100.00
Republican hold			

PA House election, 2022: Pennsylvania House, District 59
Party	Candidate	Votes	%
Republican	Leslie Rossi (incumbent)	Unopposed	
Total votes		22,149	100.00
Republican hold			

PA House special election, 2021: Pennsylvania House, District 59
Party	Candidate	Votes	%
Republican	Leslie Rossi	10,538	65.00
Democratic	Mariah Fisher	5,272	32.52
Libertarian	Robb Luther	402	2.48
Total votes		16,015	100%
Republican hold			

PA House election, 2020: Pennsylvania House, District 59
Party	Candidate	Votes	%
Republican	Mike Reese (incumbent)	Unopposed	
Total votes		32,189	100.00
Republican hold			

PA House election, 2018: Pennsylvania House, District 59
Party	Candidate	Votes	%
Republican	Mike Reese (incumbent)	18,490	70.32
Democratic	Clare Dooley	7,803	29.68
Total votes		26,293	100.00
Republican hold			

PA House election, 2016: Pennsylvania House, District 59
Party	Candidate	Votes	%
Republican	Mike Reese (incumbent)	Unopposed	
Total votes		27,700	100.00
Republican hold			
