= Tim Hennessey =

American politician (born 1947)

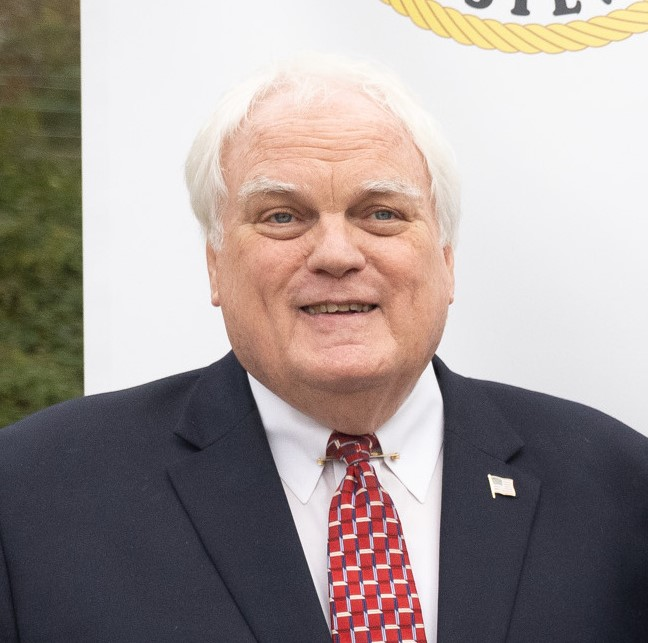

Member of the Pennsylvania House of Representatives from the 26th district
- In office January 5, 1993 – November 30, 2022
- Preceded by: Eugene G. Saloom
- Succeeded by: Paul Friel

Personal details
- Born: November 4, 1947 (age 78) Pottstown, Pennsylvania, U.S.
- Party: Republican
- Spouse: Carol Hennessey
- Children: 3
- Education: Saint Joseph's University (BS); Villanova University (JD)
- Website: Pennsylvania State Representative Tim Hennessey

Timothy F. Hennessey (born November 4, 1947) is an American attorney and politician who was a Republican member of the Pennsylvania House of Representatives, representing the 26th District from 1993 to 2022.

== Early life and education ==
Hennessey was born on November 4, 1947, in Pottstown, Pennsylvania. He graduated from St. Pius X High School in 1965. In 1969, Hennessey earned a bachelor of science degree from St. Joseph’s University. He received his Juris Doctor degree from Villanova University School of Law in 1972.

== Law career ==
Hennessey was a trial attorney for the Public Defenders’ Office in Chester County, Pennsylvania from 1973 to 1992. He was also the solicitor of North Coventry Township for 15 years.

== Political career ==
In 1992, Hennessey was elected as a Republican to represent the 26th District in the Pennsylvania House of Representatives. He was reelected 14 times. Following redistricting in advance of the 2022 elections, Hennessey's now-redrawn district had a slight Democratic lean. He would later lose to Democrat Paul Friel in that year's general election.

In 2019, Hennessey was made chairman of the Pennsylvania House Transportation Committee. He previously chaired the Aging & Older Adult Services Committee, starting in 2007.

== Political positions ==
=== 2020 presidential election ===
Following the 2020 United States presidential election, Hennessey was one of 64 Pennsylvania Republican state legislators to sign a letter asking the state's Congressmen to reject the certification of Pennsylvania's electoral votes. According to Hennessey, he signed the letter after objecting to changes made to state election procedures with respect to mail-in ballots. During the certification of the electoral votes, supporters of then-President Donald Trump stormed the U.S. Capitol Building in a bid to prevent the certification of Trump's loss to Joe Biden. Hennessey condemned the violence at the Capitol that day, but denied any connection between the calls to reject certification and the storming. He also said he did not regret signing the letter, but still affirmed Biden's victory in the election.

=== Abortion ===
With regard to abortion bans, Hennessey supports exceptions for rape, incest, and the life of the mother.

=== Immigration ===
In 2021, Hennessey expressed support for allowing undocumented immigrants to obtain a driver's license or similar equivalent.

=== Minimum wage ===
Despite supporting a minimum wage increase, in 2020, Hennessey came out against Governor Tom Wolf's minimum wage plan that according to Hennessey would "essentially double it in a few years."

=== Taxation ===
Hennessey supports amending the Pennsylvania Constitution to exempt seniors from paying school taxes.

== Personal life ==
Hennessey resides in North Coventry Township, Pennsylvania. He and his wife, Carol, have three children.

Pennsylvania House of Representatives
Preceded by Eugene G. Saloom	Member of the Pennsylvania House of Representatives from the 26th district 1993–2022	Succeeded by Paul Friel
