= Jason Ortitay =

American politician

Member of the Pennsylvania House of Representatives from the 46th district
- Incumbent
- Assumed office January 6, 2015
- Preceded by: Jesse J. White

Personal details
- Born: March 14, 1984 (age 42)
- Party: Republican
- Education: Robert Morris University
- Occupation: President, Jason's Cheesecake Co.
- Website: https://citizensforjason.com/

Jason Ortitay is a member of the Pennsylvania House of Representatives, representing the 46th House district in Allegheny County and Washington County, Pennsylvania. He is a member of the Republican Party.

== Committee assignments ==
- Education, Subcommittee on Special Education - Chair
- Environmental Resources & Energy, Subcommittee on Parks and Forests - Chair
- Gaming Oversight
- State Government, Subcommittee on Government Operations - Chair
