= Lee Taddonio =

American politician

Lee C. Taddonio

Member of the Pennsylvania House of Representatives from the 25th district
- In office 1973–1982
- Preceded by: Gust L Stemmler
- Succeeded by: Joe Markosek

Personal details
- Born: October 21, 1940 (age 85) Louisville, KY
- Party: Republican
- Spouse: Barbara
- Children: Gwen, Greg
- Education: Notre Dame
- Occupation: Retired

Lee C. Taddonio (born October 21, 1940) is a former Republican member of the Pennsylvania House of Representatives.

== Early Career and Education ==
He is the son of Charles S. and LaVerne Taddonio and received a BS in Civil Engineering from the University of Notre Dame and an MBA from the University of Pittsburgh in 1963. He served as a lieutenant in the Army Medical Service Corps from 1963–65, was president of the Franklin Regional Jaycees in 1972 and served five terms in the Pennsylvania House.

== Legislative Issues ==
He is probably best known for his work to have Pennsylvania amend its constitution to place a limit on the spending the legislature may appropriate each year. A formula would have adjusted the limit each year. Despite working on the issue for ten years which was strenuously opposed by the PSEA (state teachers' union), it came closest to passage in 1980 when the measure passed the House and a last minute change in the Senate votes led to the pass over of the bill, killing it for the session.

Other notable work included advocacy for a Route 22 by-pass in Murrysville, actions to bring groups together ending in the establishment of the Forbes Regional Hospital in Monroeville, and facilitating the opening of discussions between two opposing Murrysville rescue companies, Rescue 4 and Rescue 5 who eventually merged to form Medic One.
