= Rob Kauffman (politician) =

American politician

Robert W. Kauffman

Member of the Pennsylvania House of Representatives from the 89th district
- Incumbent
- Assumed office January 4, 2005
- Preceded by: Jeffrey W. Coy

Personal details
- Born: August 27, 1974 (age 52) York, Pennsylvania, U.S.
- Party: Republican
- Children: 4
- Education: American University (BS) 1996
- Website: repkauffman.com

Robert W. Kauffman is a Republican member of the Pennsylvania House of Representatives for the 89th District and was elected in 2004. He currently sits on the House Consumer Affairs, Gaming Oversight, and Tourism and Recreational Development Committees.

Kauffman was re-elected in 2024, against Democratic nominee Noah Kreischer.

== Personal ==
Kauffman is married, and lives in Scotland, Pennsylvania with their four children.

== Political Positions ==
Kauffman is against legalizing adult use of cannabis in Pennsylvania.

After the 2020 Presidential election, Kauffman was one of 26 Pennsylvania House Republicans who called for withdrawing certification of presidential electors. Afterward, Kauffman traveled to Arizona along with Pennsylvania state senators Doug Mastriano, and Cris Dush, to observe its 2021 Maricopa County presidential ballot audit.

Kauffman endorsed Doug Mastriano for Governor of Pennsylvania during the 2022 election.
