= Leslie Rossi =

American politician

Member of the Pennsylvania House of Representatives from the 59th district
- Incumbent
- Assumed office June 7, 2021
- Preceded by: Mike Reese

Personal details
- Party: Republican
- Spouse: Mike
- Children: 8
- Website: Official website

Leslie Baum Rossi is an American politician serving as a member of the Pennsylvania House of Representatives for the 59th district. She was elected in a May 2021 special election and assumed office the following month.

She is the first woman to represent the 59th district.

== Biography ==
Rossi has lived in Unity Township in Westmoreland County her entire life. She graduated from Derry Area High School in 1988.

In 2021, Rossi was elected to the Pennsylvania House of Representatives for the 59th district, which includes part of Westmoreland County and Somerset County. She defeated Democratic candidate Mariah Fisher and Libertarian candidate Robb Luther with 65% of the vote in the special election on May 18, 2021, which was held due to Republican Mike Reese's death in January. She is the first woman to represent the 59th district.

Rossi has eight children with her husband Mike.
