= Paul Friel =

American politician

Member of the Pennsylvania House of Representatives from the 26th district
- Incumbent
- Assumed office January 3, 2023
- Preceded by: Tim Hennessey

Personal details
- Party: Democratic
- Education: Temple University
- Website: Official website

Paul Friel is a Democratic member of the Pennsylvania House of Representatives, representing the 26th District since 2023. He serves in the Education, Agricultural & Rural Affairs, Appropriations, Energy, and Gaming Oversight Committees

Political offices
Pennsylvania House of Representatives
Preceded by Tim Hennessey	Member of the Pennsylvania House of Representatives from the 26th district 2023–present	Incumbent
