= Jesse J. White =

American politician (born 1978)

Member of the Pennsylvania House of Representatives from the 46th district
- In office January 2, 2007 – January 6, 2015
- Preceded by: Victor John Lescovitz
- Succeeded by: Jason Ortitay

Personal details
- Born: June 24, 1978 (age 48) Washington, Pennsylvania
- Party: Democratic
- Spouse: Eileen (married 2012)
- Children: Atticus (2014) and Augustus (2015)
- Education: Washington & Jefferson College (BA); Duquesne University School of Law (JD)
- Occupation: Owner, Perpetual Fortitude Political Consulting

Jesse J. White (born June 24, 1978) is a former attorney and former Democratic member of the Pennsylvania House of Representatives, representing the 46th District since 2007. His district included portions of Washington, Allegheny and Beaver Counties.

A native of Washington County, Pennsylvania, White graduated from Washington & Jefferson College in Washington, Pennsylvania with a degree in political science. He was a member of the Delta Tau Delta fraternity. After college, White earned a J.D. degree from Duquesne University School of Law in Pittsburgh. He worked in private practice for a law firm in Uniontown, Pennsylvania and for the United Steelworkers of America in Pittsburgh.

White was appointed in 2003 to the Board of Supervisors in Cecil Township, Pennsylvania. He made a run at the State House in 2004 in the Democratic primary election against 26-year incumbent Victor John Lescovitz. Lescovitz defeated White with 55% of the vote. After his defeat in the primary, White successfully ran for Auditor of Cecil Township in 2005.

In 2006, Lescovitz decided to retire from the House, creating an open seat. White ran again in the 2006 Democratic primary, facing off with Paul Walsh, a local attorney. With the fallout of the legislative pay raise lingering, White aligned with reform activist group PACleanSweep in the election. He defeated Walsh in the primary taking close to 54%. White went on to prevail in the general election by a similar margin over Republican Paul Snatchko.

White was re-elected in contested races in 2008 and 2010. In 2012, he was listed as both the Democratic and Republican nominee after securing the Republican nomination as a write-in candidate. A group of Republicans, including White's 2010 opponent Greg DeLuca, endorsed White based largely on his position on Marcellus Shale natural gas drilling. White has been a proponent of responsible, accountable drilling of Marcellus Shale, but has also been a critic of the Pennsylvania Department of Environmental Protection's withholding of data from air and water quality testing conducted near drilling sites. White also led the charge to overturn the portions of Act 13 which would have eliminated local control over certain aspects of drilling operations.

In 2013, White admitted making anonymous and fictitious online posts which attacked certain constituents who support shale-gas drilling. White originally denied the allegations, then later apologized.

== Post-legislative life ==
Jesse White lost the 2014 Election to his opponent, Jason Ortitay. On June 26, 2017, White was disbarred in Pennsylvania. In 2019, White and his family relocated to Cumberland County, Pennsylvania, to run his own political consulting firm, Perpetual Fortitude.

The United States Attorney’s Office for the Middle District of Pennsylvania announced on July 22, 2026 that it had charged White with receipt and possession of child pornography.
