= Pennsylvania House of Representatives, District 90 =

American legislative district

Pennsylvania's 90th State House of Representatives district
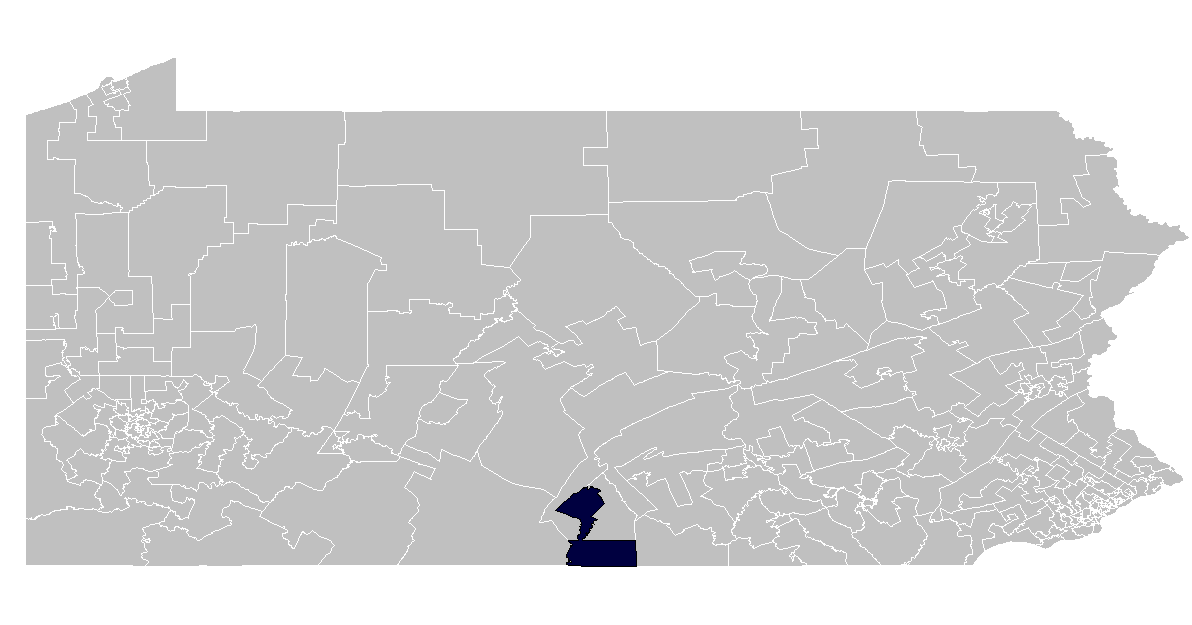
Representative
Chad Reichard; R–Waynesboro
- Population (2022): 64,923

The 90th Pennsylvania House of Representatives District is located in South Central Pennsylvania and has been represented by Chad Reichard since 2025.

== District profile ==
The 90th District is located in Franklin County and includes the following areas:

- Antrim Township
- Greencastle
- Mercersburg
- Mont Alto
- Montgomery Township
- Peters Township
- Quincy Township
- Warren Township
- Washington Township
- Waynesboro

== Representatives ==
Representative	Party	Years	District home	Note
Prior to 1969, seats were apportioned by county.
William O. Shuman	Democrat	1969 – 1978		Died on August 30, 1978
Terry Punt	Republican	1979 – 1988		Elected to the Pennsylvania State Senate
Patrick E. Fleagle	Republican	1989 – 2006		
Todd Rock	Republican	2007 – 2014	Mont Alto	
Paul Schemel	Republican	2015 – 2024	Greencastle	
Chad Reichard	Republican	2025 – present	Waynesboro	Incumbent

== Recent election results ==
PA House election, 2022: Pennsylvania House of Representatives, District 90
Party	Candidate	Votes	%
Republican	Paul Schemel	Unopposed	
Total votes		23,303	100.00
Republican hold			
