= Pat Harkins =

American politician

Patrick J. Harkins
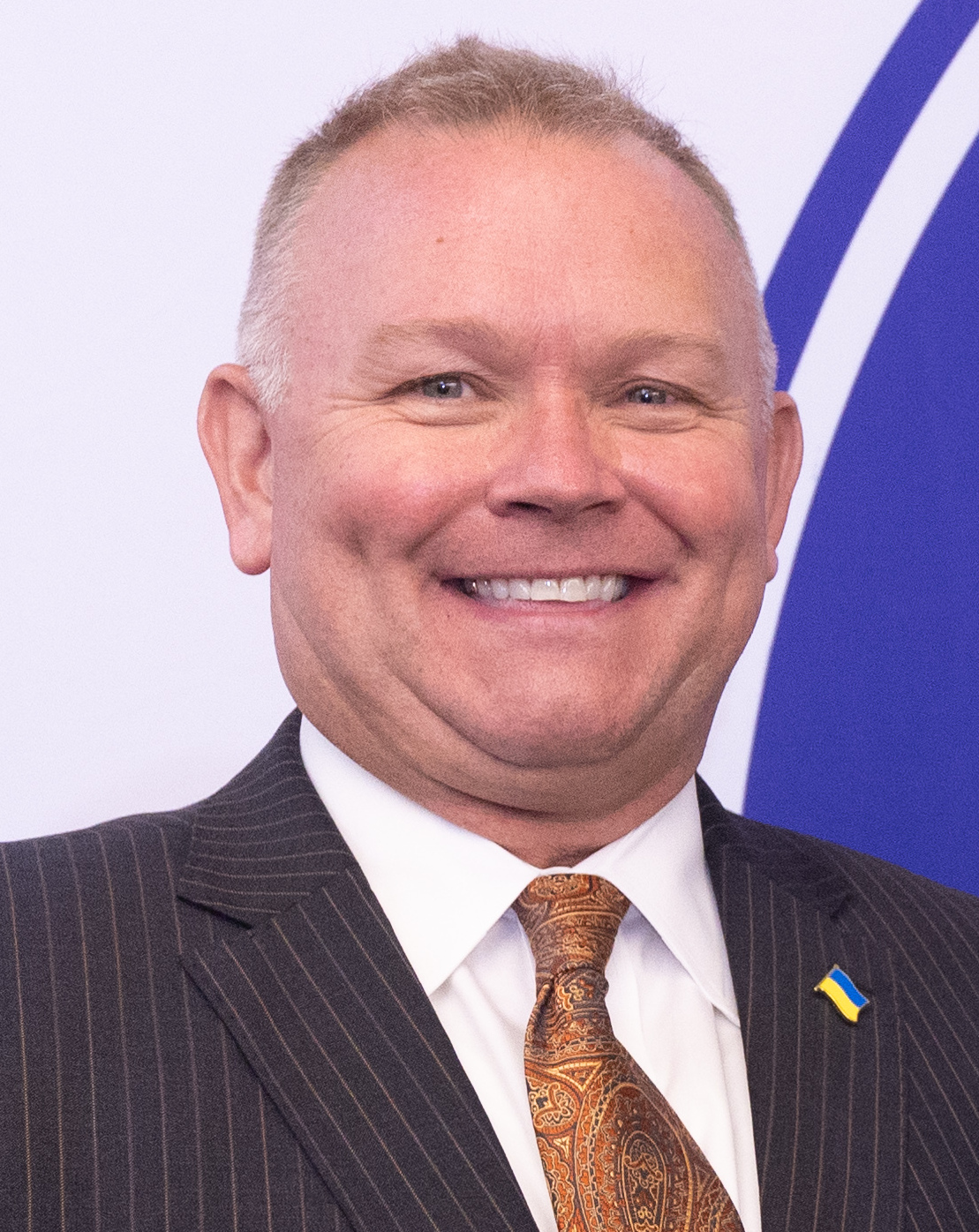

Member of the Pennsylvania House of Representatives from the 1st district
- Incumbent
- Assumed office December 1, 2006
- Preceded by: Linda Bebko-Jones

Personal details
- Born: December 22, 1963 (age 62) Erie, Pennsylvania, U.S.
- Party: Democratic
- Spouse: Michelle Harkins
- Children: 3
- Education: Mercyhurst College; Pennsylvania State University
- Website: Official website

Patrick J. Harkins (born December 22, 1963) is an American politician serving as a Democratic member of the Pennsylvania House of Representatives for 1st District and was elected in 2006.

== Early life and education ==
Harkins grew up in Erie, Pennsylvania. The youngest of five children to Bernard (Babe) and Rita Harkins. He graduated from Erie Tech Memorial High School. While in high school he earned an electrical-electronics certification. At Mercyhurst College, he studied political science and business. After a year at Mercyhurst he transferred to Penn State Behrend where he studied political science and business. He worked as a driver for UPS for 25 years. While employed there he also became active in the local Teamsters Union, Teamsters LU 397.

== Career ==
Harkins was first elected in 2006. The district opened up when Rep. Linda Bebko-Jones retired following a challenge to the validity of her petition signatures. He won a three-way primary election over Democrats Michael Skrzypczak and Dennis Iaquinta and went on to defeat Republican Christine Pontoriero with 75% of the vote.

In the primary of 2016 Harkins faced no opposition, in the general election on November 8. 2016 Harkins won reelection to his sixth term defeating William Edward Crotty by 76% to 22%. Harkins was sworn in for his sixth term on January 3, 2017.

=== Committee assignments ===
- Gaming Oversight
- Professional Licensure
- Rules

== Personal life ==
Harkins served as a board member on the Sacred Heart School Board for six years, and served as board president for three of those six years. Harkins and his wife Michelle founded the Reservoir Dogs neighborhood crime watch organization in their neighborhood. He also served as judge of elections in Erie County, Pennsylvania.

Political offices
Pennsylvania House of Representatives
Preceded by Linda Bebko-Jones	Member of the Pennsylvania House of Representatives from the 1st District; 2007–present	Incumbent
