= R. Harry Bittle =

American politician

Member of the Pennsylvania House of Representatives from the 89th district
- In office January 7, 1969 – November 30, 1982
- Preceded by: District created
- Succeeded by: Jeffrey Coy

Personal details
- Born: March 27, 1938 (age 88)
- Party: Republican

R. Harry Bittle (born March 27, 1938) is a former Republican member of the Pennsylvania House of Representatives.
