= Brandon Markosek =

American politician

Member of the Pennsylvania House of Representatives from the 25th district
- Incumbent
- Assumed office December 1, 2018
- Preceded by: Joseph Markosek

Personal details
- Party: Democratic
- Relations: Joseph Markosek (father)
- Education: Duquesne University (BS); University of Pittsburgh (MPA)

Brandon Markosek is an American politician serving as a member of the Pennsylvania House of Representatives from the 25th district. Elected in November 2018, he assumed office on December 1, 2018, succeeding his father, Joseph Markosek.

== Education ==
Markosek earned a Bachelor of Science degree in political science and history from Duquesne University in 2015 and a Master of Public Administration from the University of Pittsburgh in 2017.

== Committee Assignments ==
- Housing & Community Development Committee, Chairman
