= 2012 Pennsylvania House of Representatives election =

- November 6, 2012

All 203 seats in the Pennsylvania House of Representatives 102 seats needed for a majority
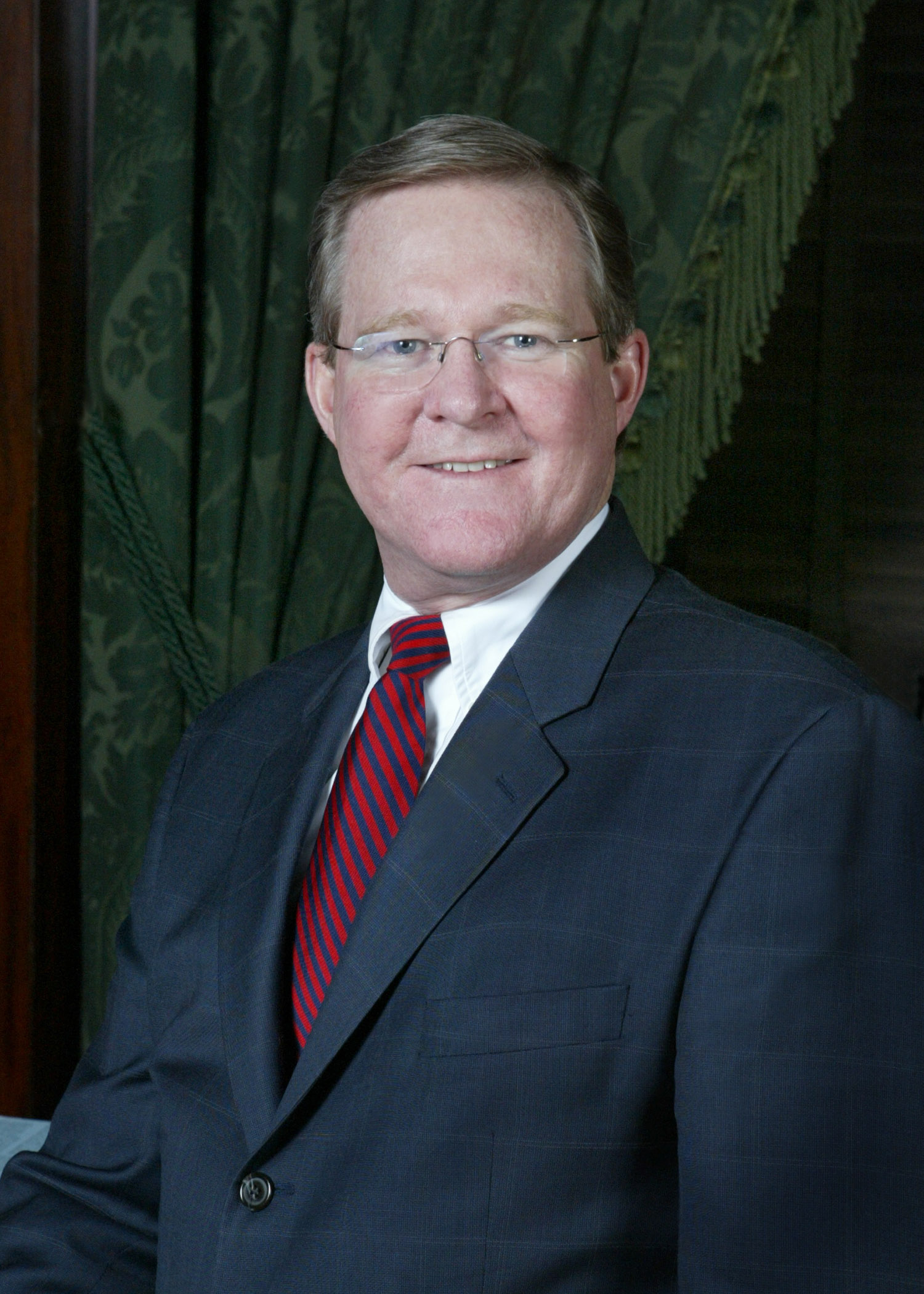

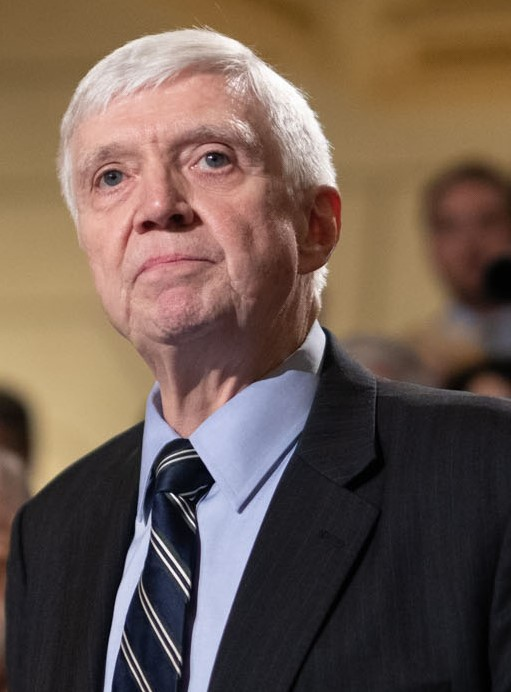
	Majority party	Minority party
Leader	Sam Smith	Frank Dermody
Party	Republican	Democratic
Leader since	January 4, 2011	January 4, 2011
Leader's seat	66th	33rd
Last election	112	91
Seats before	111	92
Seats after	111	92
Seat change	Steady	Steady
- Results: Republican hold Republican gain Democratic hold Democratic gain
Speaker before election
Sam Smith
Republican
Elected Speaker
Sam Smith
Republican

The 2012 elections for the Pennsylvania House of Representatives were held on November 6, 2012, with all districts being contested. The primary elections were held on April 24, 2012. The term of office for those elected in 2012 began when the House of Representatives convened in January 2013. Pennsylvania State Representatives are elected for two-year terms, with all 203 seats up for election every two years.

== Overview ==
Affiliation	Seats after 2010 election	Seats at end of Session	Seats after 2012 election	Membership change since last election
Democratic	91	91	92	+1
Republican	112	110	111	-1

== Predictions ==
Source	Ranking	As of
Governing	Likely R	October 24, 2012

== 2012 General election ==
District	Party	Incumbent	Status	Party	Candidate	Votes	%
1	Democratic	Pat Harkins	Re-elected	Democratic	Pat Harkins	16,970	100.00
2	Democratic	Florindo Fabrizio	Re-elected	Democratic	Florindo Fabrizio	19,860	100.00
3	Democratic	John Hornaman	Retired	Democratic	Ryan Bizzarro	16,198	53.27
3	Democratic	John Hornaman	Retired	Republican	Jason Owen	14,208	46.73
4	Republican	Curt Sonney	Re-elected	Republican	Curt Sonney	18,867	100.00
5	Republican	John Evans	Retired	Republican	Greg Lucas	13,442	55.54
5	Republican	John Evans	Retired	Democratic	Jason White	10,759	44.46
6	Republican	Brad Roae	Re-elected	Republican	Brad Roae	16,903	100.00
7	Democratic	Mark Longietti	Re-elected	Democratic	Mark Longietti	24,586	100.00
8	Republican	Dick Stevenson	Re-elected	Republican	Dick Stevenson	23,187	100.00
9	Democratic	Chris Sainato	Re-elected	Democratic	Chris Sainato	13,791	58.11
9	Democratic	Chris Sainato	Re-elected	Republican	Jason Murtha	9,941	41.89
10	Democratic	Jaret Gibbons	Re-elected	Democratic	Jaret Gibbons	13,543	52.77
10	Democratic	Jaret Gibbons	Re-elected	Republican	Michael See	12,120	47.23
11	Republican	Brian Ellis	Re-elected	Republican	Brian Ellis	25,433	100.00
12	Republican	Daryl Metcalfe	Re-elected	Republican	Daryl Metcalfe	29,567	100.00
13	Republican	John Lawrence	Re-elected	Republican	John Lawrence	17,855	53.26
13	Republican	John Lawrence	Re-elected	Democratic	Eric Schott	15,672	46.74
14	Republican	Jim Marshall	Re-elected	Republican	Jim Marshall	23,250	100.00
15	Republican	Jim Christiana	Re-elected	Republican	Jim Christiana	17,473	61.06
15	Republican	Jim Christiana	Re-elected	Democratic	Bob Williams	11,144	38.94
16	Democratic	Rob Matzie	Re-elected	Democratic	Rob Matzie	15,798	56.09
16	Democratic	Rob Matzie	Re-elected	Republican	Kathy Coder	12,369	43.91
17	Republican	Michele Brooks	Re-elected	Republican	Michele Brooks	19,904	100.00
18	Republican	Gene DiGirolamo	Re-elected	Republican	Gene DiGirolamo	18,838	100.00
19	Democratic	Jake Wheatley	Re-elected	Democratic	Jake Wheatley	20,942	100.00
20	Democratic	Adam Ravenstahl	Re-elected	Democratic	Adam Ravenstahl	19,909	81.72
20	Democratic	Adam Ravenstahl	Re-elected	Constitution	Jim Barr	4,453	18.28
21	Democratic	Dom Costa	Re-elected	Democratic	Dom Costa	22,772	100.00
22	Democratic	Martin Schmotzer	Retired	Democratic	Erin Molchany	17,512	65.33
22	Democratic	Martin Schmotzer	Retired	Republican	Chris Cratsley	9,292	34.67
23	Democratic	Dan Frankel	Re-elected	Democratic	Dan Frankel	26,742	100.00
24	Democratic	Joe Preston, Jr.	Defeated in primary	Democratic	Ed Gainey	26,032	100.00
25	Democratic	Joe Markosek	Re-elected	Democratic	Joe Markosek	16,297	54.75
25	Democratic	Joe Markosek	Re-elected	Republican	Mike Doyle	13,470	45.25
26	Republican	Tim Hennessey	Re-elected	Republican	Tim Hennessey	18,058	56.27
26	Republican	Tim Hennessey	Re-elected	Democratic	Mike Hays	14,033	43.73
27	Democratic	Dan Deasy	Re-elected	Democratic	Dan Deasy	21,034	100.00
28	Republican	Mike Turzai	Re-elected	Republican	Mike Turzai	30,236	100.00
29	Republican	Bernie O'Neill	Re-elected	Republican	Bernie O'Neill	20,970	58.30
29	Republican	Bernie O'Neill	Re-elected	Democratic	Brian Munroe	14,998	41.70
30	Republican	Randy Vulakovich	Elected to State Senate	Republican	Hal English	19,945	56.67
30	Republican	Randy Vulakovich	Elected to State Senate	Democratic	David Tusick	15,252	43.33
31	Democratic	Steve Santarsiero	Re-elected	Democratic	Steve Santarsiero	20,640	57.74
31	Democratic	Steve Santarsiero	Re-elected	Republican	Anne Chapman	15,105	42.26
32	Democratic	Tony DeLuca	Re-elected	Democratic	Tony DeLuca	21,597	74.92
32	Democratic	Tony DeLuca	Re-elected	Republican	Lawrence Paladin	7,229	25.08
33	Democratic	Frank Dermody	Re-elected	Democratic	Frank Dermody	16,101	58.97
33	Democratic	Frank Dermody	Re-elected	Republican	Gerry Vaerewyck	11,203	41.03
34	Democratic	Paul Costa	Re-elected	Democratic	Paul Costa	23,511	100.00
35	Democratic	Marc Gergely	Re-elected	Democratic	Marc Gergely	19,473	100.00
36	Democratic	Harry Readshaw	Re-elected	Democratic	Harry Readshaw	21,798	100.00
37	Republican	Tom Creighton	Retired	Republican	Mindy Fee	20,999	73.14
37	Republican	Tom Creighton	Retired	Democratic	Russ Stahley	7,713	26.86
38	Democratic	Bill Kortz	Re-elected	Democratic	Bill Kortz	21,031	100.00
39	Republican	Rick Saccone	Re-elected	Republican	Rick Saccone	14,495	50.19
39	Republican	Rick Saccone	Re-elected	Democratic	David Levdansky	14,383	49.81
40	Republican	John Maher	Re-elected	Republican	John Maher	28,402	100.00
41	Republican	Ryan Aument	Re-elected	Republican	Ryan Aument	20,183	59.81
41	Republican	Ryan Aument	Re-elected	Democratic	Marcy Dubroff	13,562	40.19
42	Democratic	Matt Smith	Re-elected	Democratic	Matt Smith	30,826	100.00
43	Republican	Scott Boyd	Retired	Republican	Keith Greiner	18,880	64.31
43	Republican	Scott Boyd	Retired	Democratic	John Weigel	10,477	35.69
44	Republican	Mark Mustio	Re-elected	Republican	Mark Mustio	21,581	61.94
44	Republican	Mark Mustio	Re-elected	Democratic	Mark Scappe	13,259	38.06
45	Democratic	Nick Kotik	Re-elected	Democratic	Nick Kotik	19,735	65.90
45	Democratic	Nick Kotik	Re-elected	Republican	Aaron Kime	10,211	34.10
46	Democratic	Jesse White	Re-elected	Democratic	Jesse White	26,314	100.00
47	Republican	Keith Gillespie	Re-elected	Republican	Keith Gillespie	20,236	60.65
47	Republican	Keith Gillespie	Re-elected	Democratic	Sarah Speed	13,127	39.35
48	Democratic	Brandon Neuman	Re-elected	Democratic	Brandon Neuman	21,206	100.00
49	Democratic	Peter Daley	Re-elected	Democratic	Peter Daley	12,244	54.49
49	Democratic	Peter Daley	Re-elected	Republican	Richard Massafra	10,225	45.51
50	Democratic	Bill DeWeese	Resigned	Democratic	Pam Snyder	13,089	61.65
50	Democratic	Bill DeWeese	Resigned	Republican	Mark Fischer	8,143	38.35
51	Democratic	Tim Mahoney	Re-elected	Democratic	Timothy S. Mahoney	12,799	63.36
51	Democratic	Tim Mahoney	Re-elected	Republican	Gary Gearing	7,400	36.64
52	Democratic	Deberah Kula	Re-elected	Democratic	Deberah Kula	15,701	100.00
53	Republican	Bob Godshall	Re-elected	Republican	Bob Godshall	17,205	60.70
53	Republican	Bob Godshall	Re-elected	Democratic	Mick Wynne	11,140	39.30
54	Republican	Eli Evankovich	Re-elected	Republican	Eli Evankovich	18,591	65.75
54	Republican	Eli Evankovich	Re-elected	Democratic	Patrick Leyland	9,685	34.25
55	Democratic	Joe Petrarca	Re-elected	Democratic	Joe Petrarca	13,757	56.09
55	Democratic	Joe Petrarca	Re-elected	Republican	John Hauser	10,770	43.91
56	Republican	George Dunbar	Re-elected	Republican	George Dunbar	17,494	58.37
56	Republican	George Dunbar	Re-elected	Democratic	Bud Geissler	12,476	41.63
57	Republican	Tim Krieger	Re-elected	Republican	Tim Krieger	17,339	64.42
57	Republican	Tim Krieger	Re-elected	Democratic	A. J. Gales	9,576	35.58
58	Democratic	Ted Harhai	Re-elected	Democratic	Ted Harhai	19,627	100.00
59	Republican	Mike Reese	Re-elected	Republican	Mike Reese	20,377	71.85
59	Republican	Mike Reese	Re-elected	Democratic	Harriet Ellenberger	7,984	28.15
60	Republican	Jeff Pyle	Re-elected	Republican	Jeff Pyle	16,238	65.06
60	Republican	Jeff Pyle	Re-elected	Democratic	Jo Ellen Bowman	8,720	34.94
61	Republican	Kate Harper	Re-elected	Republican	Kate Harper	20,119	58.2
61	Republican	Kate Harper	Re-elected	Democratic	Jo White	14,434	41.8
62	Republican	Dave Reed	Re-elected	Republican	Dave Reed	19,288	100.0
63	Republican	Donna Oberlander	Re-elected	Republican	Donna Oberlander	20,952	100.0
64	Republican	Scott Hutchinson	Elected to State Senate	Republican	Lee James	18,464	100.0
65	Republican	Kathy Rapp	Re-elected	Republican	Kathy Rapp	18,412	100.0
66	Republican	Sam Smith	Re-elected	Republican	Sam Smith	17,521	100.0
67	Republican	Martin Causer	Re-elected	Republican	Martin Causer	17,478	100.0
68	Republican	Matt Baker	Re-elected	Republican	Matt Baker	21,383	100.0
69	Republican	Carl Walker Metzgar	Re-elected	Republican	Carl Walker Metzgar	24,097	100.0
70	Democratic	Matt Bradford	Re-elected	Democratic	Matt Bradford	20,442	64.8
70	Democratic	Matt Bradford	Re-elected	Republican	Jim Phillips	11,086	35.2
71	Democratic	Bryan Barbin	Re-elected	Democratic	Bryan Barbin	12,437	56.0
71	Democratic	Bryan Barbin	Re-elected	Republican	Sherry Stalley	9,792	44.1
72	Democratic	Frank Burns	Re-elected	Democratic	Frank Burns	20,525	100.0
73	Democratic	Gary Haluska	Re-elected	Democratic	Gary Haluska	13,454	62.8
73	Democratic	Gary Haluska	Re-elected	Republican	Randy Wilson	7,985	37.3
74	Democratic	Bud George	Retired	Republican	Tommy Sankey	13,377	60.9
74	Democratic	Bud George	Retired	Democratic	Mark McCracken	8,591	39.1
75	Republican	Matt Gabler	Re-elected	Republican	Matt Gabler	18,796	100.0
76	Democratic	Mike Hanna	Re-elected	Democratic	Mike Hanna	16,445	100.0
77	Democratic	Scott Conklin	Re-elected	Democratic	Scott Conklin	19,974	65.5
77	Democratic	Scott Conklin	Re-elected	Republican	Ron Reese	10,517	34.5
78	Republican	Dick Hess	Re-elected	Republican	Dick Hess	24,641	100.0
79	Republican	Rick Geist	Defeated in primary	Republican	John McGinnis	11,304	54.6
79	Republican	Rick Geist	Defeated in primary	Democratic	Richard Flarend	9,393	45.4
80	Republican	Jerry Stern	Re-elected	Republican	Jerry Stern	21,813	100.0
81	Republican	Mike Fleck	Re-elected	Republican	Mike Fleck	18,371	100.0
82	Republican	Adam Harris	Re-elected	Republican	Adam Harris	18,933	100.0
83	Democratic	Rick Mirabito	Re-elected	Democratic	Rick Mirabito	13,259	58.8
83	Democratic	Rick Mirabito	Re-elected	Republican	Harry Rogers.	9,304	41.2
84	Republican	Garth Everett	Re-elected	Republican	Garth Everett	20,178	100.0
85	Republican	Fred Keller	Re-elected	Republican	Fred Keller	16,875	81.1
85	Republican	Fred Keller	Re-elected	Libertarian	Erik Viker	3,923	18.9
86	Republican	Mark Keller	Re-elected	Republican	Mark Keller	21,616	100.0
87	Republican	Glen Grell	Re-elected	Republican	Glen Grell	29,624	100.0
88	Republican	Sheryl Delozier	Re-elected	Republican	Sheryl Delozier	25,327	100.0
89	Republican	Rob Kauffman	Re-elected	Republican	Rob Kauffman	18,156	60.6
89	Republican	Rob Kauffman	Re-elected	Democratic	Susan Spicka	11,806	39.4
90	Republican	Todd Rock	Re-elected	Republican	Todd Rock	25,902	100.0
91	Republican	Dan Moul	Re-elected	Republican	Dan Moul	21,180	100.0
92	Republican	Scott Perry	Elected to US House	Republican	Mike Regan	22,754	71.7
92	Republican	Scott Perry	Elected to US House	Democratic	Charles Comrey	8,972	28.3
93	Republican	Ron Miller	Re-elected	Republican	Ron Miller	23,232	68.8
93	Republican	Ron Miller	Re-elected	Democratic	Linda Small	10,537	31.2
94	Republican	Stan Saylor	Re-elected	Republican	Stan Saylor	25,195	100.0
95	Democratic	Eugene DePasquale	Re-elected	Democratic	Eugene DePasquale	16,640	83.1
95	Democratic	Eugene DePasquale	Re-elected	Independent	Dave Moser	3,394	16.9
96	Democratic	Mike Sturla	Re-elected	Democratic	Mike Sturla	14,456	67.3
96	Democratic	Mike Sturla	Re-elected	Republican	Tom Garmon	5,451	25.4
96	Democratic	Mike Sturla	Re-elected	Independent	Paul Culbreth	1,561	7.3
97	Republican	John Bear	Retired	Republican	Steven Mentzer	24,800	100.0
98	Republican	Dave Hickernell	Re-elected	Republican	Dave Hickernell	21,248	100.0
99	Republican	Gordon Denlinger	Re-elected	Republican	Gordon Denlinger	19,035	100.0
100	Republican	Bryan Cutler	Re-elected	Republican	Bryan Cutler	18,689	100.0
101	Republican	Mauree Gingrich	Re-elected	Republican	Mauree Gingrich	19,620	100.0
102	Republican	RoseMarie Swanger	Re-elected	Republican	RoseMarie Swanger	23,353	100.0
103	Democratic	Ron Buxton	Retired	Democratic	Patty Kim	19,490	100.0
104	Republican	Sue Helm	Re-elected	Republican	Sue Helm	15,902	54.5
104	Republican	Sue Helm	Re-elected	Democratic	Chris Dietz	13,264	45.5
105	Republican	Ron Marsico	Re-elected	Republican	Ron Marsico	22,436	65.0
105	Republican	Ron Marsico	Re-elected	Democratic	Kelly Jean McEntee	12,073	35.0
106	Republican	John Payne	Re-elected	Republican	John Payne	18,721	64.8
106	Republican	John Payne	Re-elected	Democratic	Osman Kamara	10,162	35.2
107	Republican	Kurt Masser	Re-elected	Republican	Kurt Masser	11,545	57.1
107	Republican	Kurt Masser	Re-elected	Democratic	Ted Yeager	8,665	42.9
108	Republican	Lynda Schlegel-Culver	Re-elected	Republican	Lynda Schlegel-Culver	19,178	100.0
109	Republican	David Millard	Re-elected	Republican	David Millard	12,126	54.2
109	Republican	David Millard	Re-elected	Democratic	Dan Knorr	10,256	45.8
110	Republican	Tina Pickett	Re-elected	Republican	Tina Pickett	18,811	100.0
111	Republican	Sandra Major	Re-elected	Republican	Sandra Major	16,762	70.8
111	Republican	Sandra Major	Re-elected	Democratic	Jeff Dahlander	6,917	29.2
112	Democratic	Ken Smith	Defeated in primary	Democratic	Kevin Haggerty	17,020	74.5
112	Democratic	Ken Smith	Defeated in primary	Republican	Ray Nearhood	5,841	25.6
113	Democratic	Kevin Murphy	Defeated in primary	Democratic	Marty Flynn	19,262	100.0
114	Democratic	Sid Michaels Kavulich	Re-elected	Democratic	Sid Michaels Kavulich	24,478	100.0
115	Democratic	Ed Staback	Retired	Democratic	Frank Farina	13,722	64.1
115	Democratic	Ed Staback	Retired	Republican	Theresa Kane	7,675	35.9
116	Republican	Tarah Toohil	Re-elected	Republican	Tarah Toohil	14,603	67.2
116	Republican	Tarah Toohil	Re-elected	Democratic	Ransom Young	7,130	32.8
117	Republican	Karen Boback	Re-elected	Republican	Karen Boback	23,819	100.0
118	Democratic	Mike Carroll	Re-elected	Democratic	Mike Carroll	16,462	65.8
118	Democratic	Mike Carroll	Re-elected	Republican	Terrence O'Connor	8,563	34.2
119	Democratic	Jerry Mullery	Re-elected	Democratic	Jerry Mullery	13,063	60.9
119	Democratic	Jerry Mullery	Re-elected	Republican	Rick Arnold	8,403	39.2
120	Democratic	Phyllis Mundy	Re-elected	Democratic	Phyllis Mundy	14,051	56.1
120	Democratic	Phyllis Mundy	Re-elected	Republican	Aaron Kaufer	11,002	43.9
121	Democratic	Eddie Day Pashinski	Re-elected	Democratic	Eddie Day Pashinski	15,539	100.0
122	Republican	Doyle Heffley	Re-elected	Republican	Doyle Heffley	14,194	58.9
122	Republican	Doyle Heffley	Re-elected	Democratic	Ron Rabenold	9,892	41.1
123	Democratic	Neal Goodman	Re-elected	Democratic	Neal Goodman	16,810	100.0
124	Republican	Jerry Knowles	Re-elected	Republican	Jerry Knowles	19,297	78.5
124	Republican	Jerry Knowles	Re-elected	Independent	Dante Picciano	5,276	21.5
125	Republican	Mike Tobash	Re-elected	Republican	Mike Tobash	18,012	71.1
125	Republican	Mike Tobash	Re-elected	Democratic	Vicki Harman	7,323	28.9
126	Democratic	Dante Santoni	Retired	Democratic	Mark Rozzi	16,358	70.5
126	Democratic	Dante Santoni	Retired	Republican	Jim Billman	6,847	29.5
127	Democratic	Tom Caltagirone	Re-elected	Democratic	Tom Caltagirone	13,817	100.0
128	Republican	Mark Gillen	Re-elected	Republican	Mark Gillen	23,519	100.0
129	Republican	Jim Cox	Re-elected	Republican	Jim Cox	17,051	59.1
129	Republican	Jim Cox	Re-elected	Democratic	Erik Saar	11,824	41.0
130	Republican	David Maloney	Re-elected	Republican	David Maloney	19,118	62.8
130	Republican	David Maloney	Re-elected	Democratic	Russell Diesinger	11,313	37.2
131	Republican	Justin Simmons	Re-elected	Republican	Justin Simmons	14,226	51.0
131	Republican	Justin Simmons	Re-elected	Democratic	Kevin Deely	13,664	49.0
132	Democratic	Jennifer Mann	Retired	Democratic	Mike Schlossberg	17,341	100.0
133	Democratic	Joe Brennan	Retired	Democratic	Dan McNeill	13,291	64.6
133	Democratic	Joe Brennan	Retired	Republican	David Molony	7,277	35.4
134	Republican	Ryan Mackenzie	Re-elected	Republican	Ryan Mackenzie	19,129	60.5
134	Republican	Ryan Mackenzie	Re-elected	Democratic	John Reynard	12,484	39.5
135	Democratic	Steve Samuelson	Re-elected	Democratic	Steve Samuelson	18,036	69.9
135	Democratic	Steve Samuelson	Re-elected	Republican	Kenneth Barreto	7,759	30.1
136	Democratic	Bob Freeman	Re-elected	Democratic	Bob Freeman	17,067	100.0
137	Republican	Joe Emrick	Re-elected	Republican	Joe Emrick	18,805	61.4
137	Republican	Joe Emrick	Re-elected	Democratic	Joe Capozzolo	11,834	38.6
138	Republican	Marcia Hahn	Re-elected	Republican	Marcia Hahn	19,797	63.1
138	Republican	Marcia Hahn	Re-elected	Democratic	Leslie Altieri	11,595	36.9
139	Republican	Mike Peifer	Re-elected	Republican	Mike Peifer	16,636	100.0
140	Democratic	John Galloway	Re-elected	Democratic	John Galloway	18,412	73.2
140	Democratic	John Galloway	Re-elected	Republican	Eric David	6,755	26.8
141	Democratic	Tina Davis	Re-elected	Democratic	Tina Davis	17,600	72.6
141	Democratic	Tina Davis	Re-elected	Republican	Anthony Sposato	6,653	27.4
142	Republican	Frank Farry	Re-elected	Republican	Frank Farry	20,528	100.0
143	Republican	Marguerite Quinn	Re-elected	Republican	Marguerite Quinn	21,333	61.9
143	Republican	Marguerite Quinn	Re-elected	Democratic	Joe Frederick	13,161	38.2
144	Republican	Kathy Watson	Re-elected	Republican	Kathy Watson	25,393	100.0
145	Republican	Paul Clymer	Re-elected	Republican	Paul Clymer	19,639	64.7
145	Republican	Paul Clymer	Re-elected	Democratic	Mary Whitesell	10,711	35.3
146	Republican	Tom Quigley	Defeated	Democratic	Mark Painter	14,801	50.4
146	Republican	Tom Quigley	Defeated	Republican	Tom Quigley	14,585	49.6
147	Republican	Marcy Toepel	Re-elected	Republican	Marcy Toepel	19,552	61.4
147	Republican	Marcy Toepel	Re-elected	Democratic	Betty White	12,288	38.6
148	Democratic	Mike Gerber	Retired	Democratic	Mary Jo Daley	20,830	58.5
148	Democratic	Mike Gerber	Retired	Republican	Mike Ludwig	14,759	41.5
149	Democratic	Tim Briggs	Re-elected	Democratic	Tim Briggs	20,358	65.8
149	Democratic	Tim Briggs	Re-elected	Republican	Perry Hamilton	10,604	34.3
150	Republican	Mike Vereb	Re-elected	Republican	Mike Vereb	16,588	54.3
150	Republican	Mike Vereb	Re-elected	Democratic	Kelly Lynn Devine	13,965	45.7
151	Republican	Todd Stephens	Re-elected	Republican	Todd Stephens	19,879	59.6
151	Republican	Todd Stephens	Re-elected	Democratic	Will Sylianteng	13,457	40.4
152	Republican	Tom Murt	Re-elected	Republican	Tom Murt	18,950	63.7
152	Republican	Tom Murt	Re-elected	Democratic	Ron Kolla	10,807	36.3
153	Democratic	Madeleine Dean	Re-elected	Democratic	Madeleine Dean	21,113	64.3
153	Democratic	Madeleine Dean	Re-elected	Republican	Nick Mattiacci	11,411	34.7
153	Democratic	Madeleine Dean	Re-elected	Libertarian	Ken Krawchuk	322	1.0
154	Democratic	Larry Curry	Retired	Democratic	Steve McCarter	25,294	75.7
154	Democratic	Larry Curry	Retired	Republican	Mark Sirinides	8,143	24.4
155	Republican	Curt Schroder	Retired	Republican	Becky Corbin	19,601	53.6
155	Republican	Curt Schroder	Retired	Democratic	Josh Maxwell	16,976	46.4
156	Republican	Dan Truitt	Re-elected	Republican	Dan Truitt	16,944	51.4
156	Republican	Dan Truitt	Re-elected	Democratic	Bret M. Binder	16,048	48.6
157	Republican	Warren Kampf	Re-elected	Republican	Warren Kampf	17,136	51.1
157	Republican	Warren Kampf	Re-elected	Democratic	Paul Drucker	16,379	48.9
158	Republican	Chris Ross	Re-elected	Republican	Chris Ross	19,584	58.5
158	Republican	Chris Ross	Re-elected	Democratic	Susan Rzucidlo	13,887	41.5
159	Democratic	Thaddeus Kirkland	Re-elected	Democratic	Thaddeus Kirkland	17,272	79.9
159	Democratic	Thaddeus Kirkland	Re-elected	Republican	James Schiliro	4,352	20.1
160	Republican	Steve Barrar	Re-elected	Republican	Steve Barrar	27,138	100.00
161	Republican	Joe Hackett	Re-elected	Republican	Joe Hackett	17,125	52.9
161	Republican	Joe Hackett	Re-elected	Democratic	Larry DeMarco	15,256	47.1
162	Republican	Nick Miccarelli	Re-elected	Republican	Nick Miccarelli	24,291	100.0
163	Republican	Nick Micozzie	Re-elected	Republican	Nick Micozzie	14,003	50.6
163	Republican	Nick Micozzie	Re-elected	Democratic	Sheamus Bonner	13,649	49.4
164	Democratic	Margo Davidson	Re-elected	Democratic	Margo Davidson	16,886	66.9
164	Democratic	Margo Davidson	Re-elected	Republican	Earl Toole	8,339	33.1
165	Republican	Bill Adolph	Re-elected	Republican	Bill Adolph	118,754	63.4
165	Republican	Bill Adolph	Re-elected	Democratic	Jeremy Fearn	10,813	36.6
166	Democratic	Greg Vitali	Re-elected	Democratic	Greg Vitali	20,637	63.1
166	Democratic	Greg Vitali	Re-elected	Republican	Bill Toal	12,077	36.9
167	Republican	Duane Milne	Re-elected	Republican	Duane Milne	20,690	58.6
167	Republican	Duane Milne	Re-elected	Democratic	Rob Broderick	14,627	41.4
168	Republican	Tom Killion	Re-elected	Republican	Tom Killion	19,424	57.8
168	Republican	Tom Killion	Re-elected	Democratic	Beth Alois	14,174	42.2
169	Democratic	Ed Neilson	Re-elected	Democratic	Ed Neilson	15,379	65.3
169	Democratic	Ed Neilson	Re-elected	Republican	David Kralle	8,189	34.8
170	Democratic	Brendan Boyle	Re-elected	Democratic	Brendan Boyle	17,927	100.0
171	Republican	Kerry Benninghoff	Re-elected	Republican	Kerry Benninghoff	20,118	65.2
171	Republican	Kerry Benninghoff	Re-elected	Democratic	Chris Lee	10,735	34.8
172	Democratic	Kevin Boyle	Re-elected	Democratic	Kevin Boyle	16,226	68.0
172	Democratic	Kevin Boyle	Re-elected	Republican	Al Taubenberger	7,642	32.0
173	Democratic	Mike McGeehan	Re-elected	Democratic	Mike McGeehan	15,361	100.0
174	Democratic	John Sabatina	Re-elected	Democratic	John Sabatina	17,366	100.0
175	Democratic	Mike O'Brien	Re-elected	Democratic	Mike O'Brien	23,446	100.0
176	Republican	Mario Scavello	Re-elected	Republican	Mario Scavello	12,715	55.0
176	Republican	Mario Scavello	Re-elected	Democratic	Maureen Madden	10,407	45.0
177	Republican	John Taylor	Re-elected	Republican	John Taylor	11,933	56.9
177	Republican	John Taylor	Re-elected	Democratic	Will Dunbar	9,030	43.1
178	Republican	Scott Petri	Re-elected	Republican	Scott Petri	24,789	100.0
179	Democratic	Tony Payton	Removed from ballot	Democratic	James Clay	18,328	100.0
180	Democratic	Angel Cruz	Re-elected	Democratic	Angel Cruz	16,174	100.0
181	Democratic	Curtis Thomas	Re-elected	Democratic	Curtis Thomas	23,831	100.0
182	Democratic	Babette Josephs	Retired	Democratic	Brian Sims	26,618	100.0
183	Republican	Julie Harhart	Re-elected	Republican	Julie Harhart	20,913	100.0
184	Democratic	Bill Keller	Re-elected	Democratic	Bill Keller	18,401	100.0
185	Democratic	Maria Donatucci	Re-elected	Democratic	Maria Donatucci	21,544	100.0
186	Democratic	Harold James	Retired	Democratic	Jordan Harris	25,529	100.0
187	Republican	Gary Day	Re-elected	Republican	Gary Day	18,693	63.1
187	Republican	Gary Day	Re-elected	Democratic	Joe Haas	10,927	36.9
188	Democratic	Jim Roebuck	Re-elected	Democratic	Jim Roebuck	21,620	93.9
188	Democratic	Jim Roebuck	Re-elected	Republican	Ernest Adkins	1,406	6.1
189	Republican	Rosemary Brown	Re-elected	Republican	Rosemary Brown	14,284	55.5
189	Republican	Rosemary Brown	Re-elected	Democratic	Elizabeth Forrest	11,473	44.5
190	Democratic	Vanessa Brown	Re-elected	Democratic	Vanessa Brown	26,760	100.0
191	Democratic	Ronald Waters	Re-elected	Democratic	Ronald Waters	24,867	100.0
192	Democratic	Louise Bishop	Re-elected	Democratic	Louise Bishop	26,782	100.0
193	Republican	Will Tallman	Re-elected	Republican	Will Tallman	18,679	70.8
193	Republican	Will Tallman	Re-elected	Democratic	Anthony McNevin	7,689	29.2
194	Democratic	Pamela DeLissio	Re-elected	Democratic	Pamela DeLissio	19,743	76.6
194	Democratic	Pamela DeLissio	Re-elected	Republican	Linda Wolfe Bateman	6,017	23.4
195	Democratic	Michelle Brownlee	Re-elected	Democratic	Michelle Brownlee	25,937	100.0
196	Republican	Seth Grove	Re-elected	Republican	Seth Grove	25,959	100.0
197	Democratic	Gary Williams	Retired	Democratic	J. P. Miranda	24,719	95.6
197	Democratic	Gary Williams	Retired	Republican	Steve Crum	1,141	4.4
198	Democratic	Rosita Youngblood	Re-elected	Democratic	Rosita Youngblood	25,394	100.0
199	Republican	Stephen Bloom	Re-elected	Republican	Stephen Bloom	21,415	100.0
200	Democratic	Cherelle Parker	Re-elected	Democratic	Cherelle Parker	28,893	100.0
201	Democratic	John Myers	Retired	Democratic	Stephen Kinsey	25,307	100.0
202	Democratic	Mark Cohen	Re-elected	Democratic	Mark Cohen	21,101	100.0
203	Democratic	Dwight Evans	Re-elected	Democratic	Dwight Evans	26,109	100.0

Source: Pennsylvania Department of State
