= 2008 Pennsylvania House of Representatives election =

- November 4, 2008

All 203 seats in the Pennsylvania House of Representatives 102 seats needed for a majority

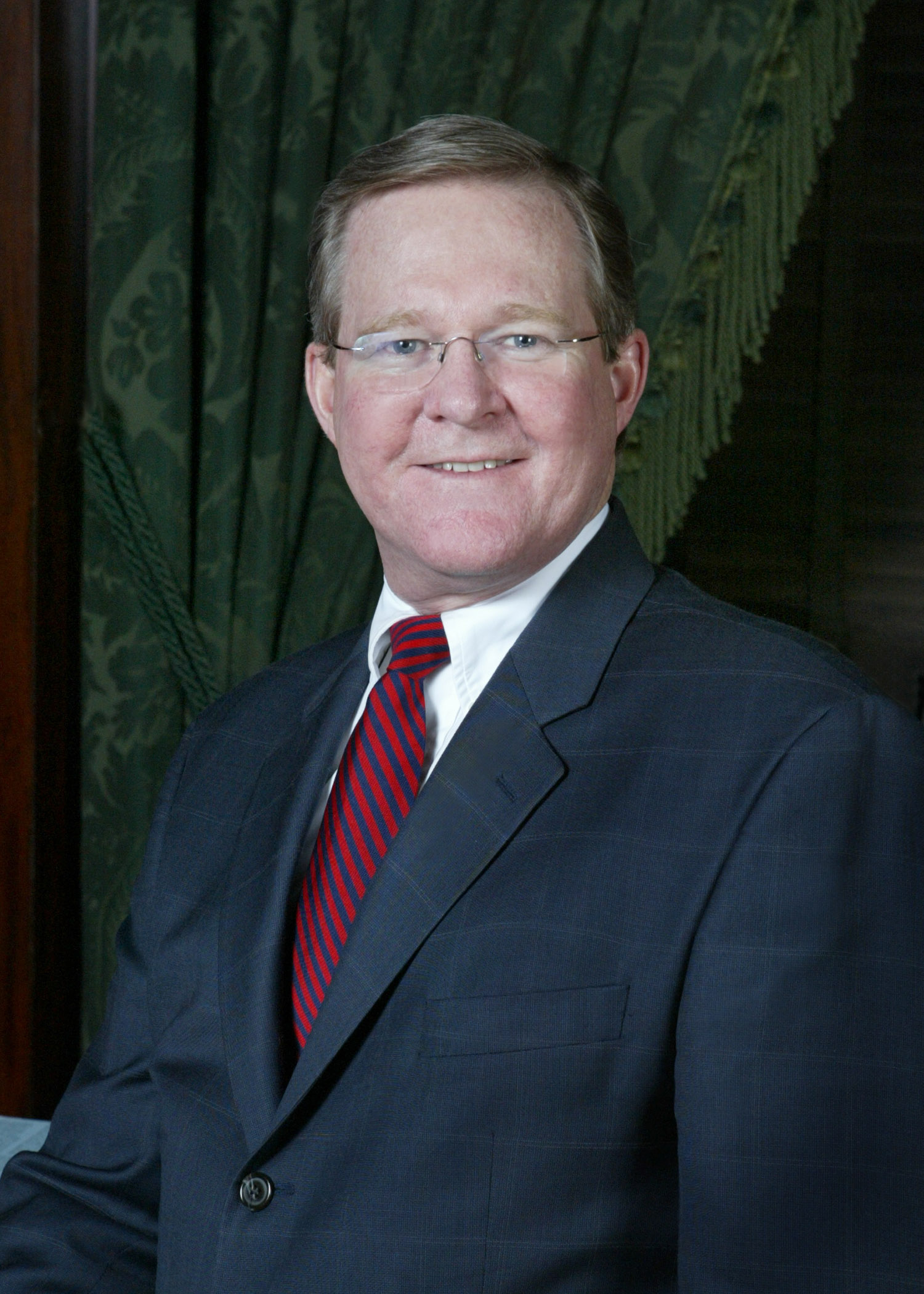
	Majority party	Minority party
Leader	Bill DeWeese	Sam Smith
Party	Democratic	Republican
Leader since	January 3, 1995	January 2, 2007
Leader's seat	50th	66th
Last election	102	101
Seats after	104	99
Seat change	▲2	▼2
- Results: Democratic hold Democratic gain Republican hold Republican gain
Speaker before election
Dennis O'Brien
Republican
Elected Speaker
Keith McCall
Democratic

The 2008 Elections for the Pennsylvania House of Representatives were held on November 4, 2008, with all districts being contested. Necessary primary elections were held on April 22, 2008. The term of office for those elected in 2008 will run from January 6, 2009 until November 2010. State Representatives are elected for two-year terms, with the entire House of Representatives up for a vote every two years.

== Overview ==
Affiliation	Seats after 2006 Election	Seats after 2008 Election	Membership Change
Democratic Party	102	104	+2
Republican Party	101	99	-2

== Predictions ==
Source	Ranking	As of
Stateline	Tossup	October 15, 2008

== General election ==
District	Party	Incumbent	Status	Party	Candidate	Votes	%
1	Democratic	Patrick Harkins	Re-elected	Democratic	Patrick Harkins	17,785	100.0
2	Democratic	Florindo Fabrizio	Re-elected	Democratic	Florindo Fabrizio	21,351	100.0
3	Democratic	John Hornaman	Re-elected	Democratic	John Hornaman	17,460	57.2
3	Democratic	John Hornaman	Re-elected	Republican	Jason Howes	13,075	42.8
4	Republican	Curt Sonney	Re-elected	Republican	Curt Sonney	17,011	66.8
4	Republican	Curt Sonney	Re-elected	Democratic	Rick Mitchell	8,441	33.2
5	Republican	John R. Evans	Re-elected	Republican	John R. Evans	16,151	64.9
5	Republican	John R. Evans	Re-elected	Democratic	John Alward	8,754	35.2
6	Republican	Brad Roae	Re-elected	Republican	Brad Roae	17,653	100.0
7	Democratic	Mark Longietti	Re-elected	Democratic	Mark Longietti	24,345	100.0
8	Republican	Dick Stevenson	Re-elected	Republican	Dick Stevenson	23,006	100.0
9	Democratic	Chris Sainato	Re-elected	Democratic	Chris Sainato	24,007	100.0
10	Democratic	Jaret Gibbons	Re-elected	Democratic	Jaret Gibbons	14,772	55.4
10	Democratic	Jaret Gibbons	Re-elected	Republican	Bob Morabito	11,843	44.6
11	Republican	Brian L. Ellis	Re-elected	Republican	Brian L. Ellis	17,613	67.1
11	Republican	Brian L. Ellis	Re-elected	Democratic	Dave Wilson	8,620	32.9
12	Republican	Daryl Metcalfe	Re-elected	Republican	Daryl Metcalfe	22,359	66.9
12	Republican	Daryl Metcalfe	Re-elected	Democratic	John Olesnevich	11,038	33.1
13	Republican	Art Hershey	Retired	Democratic	Tom Houghton	15,275	47.5
13	Republican	Art Hershey	Retired	Republican	John A. Lawrence	14,926	46.4
13	Republican	Art Hershey	Retired	Independent	Ronald K. Hershey	1,981	6.2
14	Republican	Jim E. Marshall	Re-elected	Republican	Jim E. Marshall	14,781	59.2
14	Republican	Jim E. Marshall	Re-elected	Democratic	Dennis Rousseau	10,192	40.8
15	Democratic	Vince Biancucci	Defeated	Republican	Jim Christiana	15,134	51.5
15	Democratic	Vince Biancucci	Defeated	Democratic	Vince Biancucci	14,280	48.5
16	Democratic	Sean Ramaley	Ran for State Senate	Democratic	Robert F. Matzie	22,035	100.0
17	Republican	Michele Brooks	Re-elected	Republican	Michele Brooks	15,929	64.2
17	Republican	Michele Brooks	Re-elected	Democratic	Donald Duke Whiting	8,888	35.8
18	Republican	Gene DiGirolamo	Re-elected	Republican	Gene DiGirolamo	18,535	67.2
18	Republican	Gene DiGirolamo	Re-elected	Democratic	Harris Martin	9,049	32.8
19	Democratic	Jake Wheatley	Re-elected	Democratic	Jake Wheatley	22,422	100.0
20	Democratic	Don Walko	Re-elected	Democratic	Don Walko	22,012	85.6
20	Democratic	Don Walko	Re-elected	Republican	Jim Barr	3,714	14.4
21	Democratic	Lisa Bennington	Retired	Democratic	Dom Costa	20,426	78.8
21	Democratic	Lisa Bennington	Retired	Green	Jonah Yon McAllister-Erickson	1,839	7.1
21	Democratic	Lisa Bennington	Retired	Independent	Dan Mahon	3,645	14.1
22	Democratic	Chelsa Wagner	Re-elected	Democratic	Chelsa Wagner	24,171	100.0
23	Democratic	Dan Frankel	Re-elected	Democratic	Dan Frankel	25,432	86.8
23	Democratic	Dan Frankel	Re-elected	Green	Mary E. Hughes	3,871	13.2
24	Democratic	Joseph Preston, Jr.	Re-elected	Democratic	Joseph Preston, Jr.	26,002	100.0
25	Democratic	Joe Markosek	Re-elected	Democratic	Joe Markosek	28,371	100.0
26	Republican	Tim Hennessey	Re-elected	Democratic	Fern B. Kauffman	15,275	48.0
26	Republican	Tim Hennessey	Re-elected	Republican	Tim Hennessey	16,578	52.0
27	Democratic	Tom Petrone	Retired	Democratic	Daniel J. Deasy	19,130	80.2
27	Democratic	Tom Petrone	Retired	Reform	Frank J. Liberatore	4,714	19.8
28	Republican	Mike Turzai	Re-elected	Democratic	Brad Cline	9,447	25.8
28	Republican	Mike Turzai	Re-elected	Republican	Mike Turzai	27,124	74.2
29	Republican	Bernie O'Neill	Re-elected	Democratic	Brad Kirsch	14,611	40.6
29	Republican	Bernie O'Neill	Re-elected	Republican	Bernie O'Neill	21,406	59.4
30	Republican	Randy Vulakovich	Re-elected	Republican	Randy Vulakovich	28,715	100.0
31	Republican	David J. Steil	Retired	Democratic	Steve Santarsiero	18,938	52.9
31	Republican	David J. Steil	Retired	Republican	Pete Stainthorpe	16,851	47.1
32	Democratic	Anthony M. DeLuca	Re-elected	Democratic	Anthony M. DeLuca	21,955	73.2
32	Democratic	Anthony M. DeLuca	Re-elected	Republican	Joseph F. O'Connor	8,018	26.8
33	Democratic	Frank Dermody	Re-elected	Democratic	Frank Dermody	14,521	51.0
33	Democratic	Frank Dermody	Re-elected	Republican	Jason Davidek	13,941	49.0
34	Democratic	Paul Costa	Re-elected	Democratic	Paul Costa	24,934	100.0
35	Democratic	Marc Gergely	Re-elected	Democratic	Marc Gergely	20,195	88.9
35	Democratic	Marc Gergely	Re-elected	Libertarian	David Posipanka	2,530	11.1
36	Democratic	Harry Readshaw	Re-elected	Democratic	Harry Readshaw	23,819	100.0
37	Republican	Tom Creighton	Re-elected	Republican	Tom Creighton	23,808	100.0
38	Democratic	William Kortz	Re-elected	Democratic	William Kortz	20,026	72.3
38	Democratic	William Kortz	Re-elected	Republican	Daniel Davis	7,656	27.7
39	Democratic	David Levdansky	Re-elected	Democratic	David Levdansky	15,519	52.8
39	Democratic	David Levdansky	Re-elected	Republican	Monica Douglas	13,887	47.2
40	Republican	John A. Maher	Re-elected	Republican	John A. Maher	27,872	100.0
41	Republican	Katie True	Re-elected	Republican	Katie True	25,133	100.0
42	Democratic	Matthew H. Smith	Re-elected	Democratic	Matthew H. Smith	22,771	65.4
42	Democratic	Matthew H. Smith	Re-elected	Republican	Jim Blazeck	12,058	34.6
43	Republican	Scott W. Boyd	Re-elected	Republican	Scott W. Boyd	23,983	100.0
44	Republican	Mark Mustio	Re-elected	Democratic	Ayanna M. Lee	12,594	37.0
44	Republican	Mark Mustio	Re-elected	Republican	Mark Mustio	21,488	63.0
45	Democratic	Nick Kotik	Re-elected	Democratic	Nick Kotik	24,305	100.0
46	Democratic	Jesse J. White	Re-elected	Democratic	Jesse J. White	17,837	63.2
46	Democratic	Jesse J. White	Re-elected	Republican	Frank Yuvon	10,375	36.8
47	Republican	Keith J. Gillespie	Re-elected	Republican	Keith J. Gillespie	25,737	100.0
48	Democratic	Timothy J. Solobay	Re-elected	Democratic	Timothy J. Solobay	22,532	100.0
49	Democratic	Peter J. Daley	Re-elected	Democratic	Peter J. Daley	19,134	100.0
50	Democratic	H. William DeWeese	Re-elected	Democratic	H. William DeWeese	12,523	54.6
50	Democratic	H. William DeWeese	Re-elected	Republican	Greg Hopkins	10,416	45.4
51	Democratic	Timothy S. Mahoney	Re-elected	Democratic	Timothy S. Mahoney	13,540	67.4
51	Democratic	Timothy S. Mahoney	Re-elected	Independent	Gary Gearing	6,539	32.6
52	Democratic	Deberah Kula	Re-elected	Democratic	Deberah Kula	17,622	100.0
53	Republican	Robert Godshall	Re-elected	Democratic	Jack Hansen	11,552	40.3
53	Republican	Robert Godshall	Re-elected	Republican	Robert Godshall	17,106	59.7
54	Democratic	John Pallone	Re-elected	Democratic	John Pallone	21,176	100.0
55	Democratic	Joseph A. Petrarca, Jr.	Re-elected	Democratic	Joseph A. Petrarca, Jr.	19,995	100.0
56	Democratic	James E. Casorio, Jr.	Re-elected	Democratic	James E. Casorio, Jr.	17,827	59.7
56	Democratic	James E. Casorio, Jr.	Re-elected	Republican	Susanna Lisotto	12,034	40.3
57	Democratic	Thomas A. Tangretti	Retired	Republican	Tim Krieger	13,633	51.6
57	Democratic	Thomas A. Tangretti	Retired	Democratic	John W. Boyle	12,769	48.4
58	Democratic	R. Ted Harhai	Re-elected	Democratic	R. Ted Harhai	21,165	100.0
59	Republican	Jess Stairs	Retired	Republican	Mike Reese	16,434	59.9
59	Republican	Jess Stairs	Retired	Democratic	Michael O'Barto	11,020	40.1
60	Republican	Jeff Pyle	Re-elected	Republican	Jeff Pyle	23,363	100.0
61	Republican	Kate M. Harper	Re-elected	Republican	Kate M. Harper	19,541	56.1
61	Republican	Kate M. Harper	Re-elected	Democratic	Frank X. Custer	15,306	43.9
62	Republican	Dave L. Reed	Re-elected	Republican	Dave L. Reed	24,672	100.0
63	Republican	Fred McIlhattan	Retired	Republican	Donna Oberlander	15,737	64.5
63	Republican	Fred McIlhattan	Retired	Democratic	Matthew Ellenberger	8,095	33.2
63	Republican	Fred McIlhattan	Retired	Libertarian	Michael J. Robertson	556	2.3
64	Republican	Scott Hutchinson	Re-elected	Republican	Scott Hutchinson	19,292	86.8
64	Republican	Scott Hutchinson	Re-elected	Libertarian	Vance H. Mays	2,943	13.2
65	Republican	Kathy Rapp	Re-elected	Republican	Kathy Rapp	21,507	100.0
66	Republican	Samuel H. Smith	Re-elected	Republican	Samuel H. Smith	15,346	67.4
66	Republican	Samuel H. Smith	Re-elected	Democratic	Samy Elmasry	7,423	32.6
67	Republican	Martin Causer	Re-elected	Republican	Martin Causer	18,248	100.0
68	Republican	Matt E. Baker	Re-elected	Republican	Matt E. Baker	23,309	100.0
69	Republican	Bob Bastian	Retired	Republican	Carl Metzgar Walker	17,314	68.1
69	Republican	Bob Bastian	Retired	Democratic	Ken Warnick	8,112	31.9
70	Republican	Jay Moyer	Defeated	Democratic	Matthew D. Bradford	16,360	51.3
70	Republican	Jay Moyer	Defeated	Republican	Jay Moyer	15,577	48.7
71	Democratic	Edward P. Wojnaroski, Sr.	Retired	Democratic	Bryan Barbin	12,193	50.5
71	Democratic	Edward P. Wojnaroski, Sr.	Retired	Republican	Jim Rigby	11,943	49.5
72	Democratic	Thomas F. Yewcic	Retired	Democratic	Frank Burns	14,171	52.6
72	Democratic	Thomas F. Yewcic	Retired	Republican	Chris Voccio	12,791	47.4
73	Democratic	Gary Haluska	Re-elected	Democratic	Gary Haluska	21,608	100.0
74	Democratic	Camille George	Re-elected	Democratic	Camille George	13,890	63.4
74	Democratic	Camille George	Re-elected	Republican	Richard Hansel	8,020	36.6
75	Democratic	Dan A. Surra	Defeated	Republican	Matt Gabler	12,496	53.3
75	Democratic	Dan A. Surra	Defeated	Democratic	Dan A. Surra	10,932	46.7
76	Democratic	Mike Hanna	Re-elected	Democratic	Mike Hanna	15,695	69.2
76	Democratic	Mike Hanna	Re-elected	Republican	Harold C. Yost, Jr.	7,109	30.8
77	Democratic	Scott Conklin	Re-elected	Democratic	Scott Conklin	23,153	69.6
77	Democratic	Scott Conklin	Re-elected	Republican	Thomas A. Martin	10,120	30.4
78	Republican	Dick Hess	Re-elected	Republican	Dick Hess	25,338	100.0
79	Republican	Richard Geist	Re-elected	Republican	Richard Geist	18,568	100.0
80	Republican	Jerry Stern	Re-elected	Republican	Jerry Stern	23,419	100.0
81	Republican	Mike Fleck	Re-elected	Republican	Mike Fleck	19,499	100.0
82	Republican	Adam Harris	Re-elected	Republican	Adam Harris	19,856	100.0
83	Republican	Steven W. Cappelli	Ran for State Senate	Democratic	Richard Mirabito	14,030	57.8
83	Republican	Steven W. Cappelli	Ran for State Senate	Republican	Dave Huffman	10,251	42.2
84	Republican	Garth Everett	Re-elected	Republican	Garth Everett	20,852	100.0
85	Republican	Russ Fairchild	Re-elected	Republican	Russ Fairchild	17,165	70.5
85	Republican	Russ Fairchild	Re-elected	Democratic	Stephen J. Connolley	7,199	29.5
86	Republican	Mark Keller	Re-elected	Republican	Mark Keller	24,463	100.0
87	Republican	Glen Grell	Re-elected	Republican	Glen Grell	24,359	67.7
87	Republican	Glen Grell	Re-elected	Democratic	Donald A. Steinmeier	11,642	32.3
88	Republican	Jerry L. Nailor	Retired	Republican	Sheryl M. Delozier	20,545	63.7
88	Republican	Jerry L. Nailor	Retired	Democratic	Margie Stuski	11,702	36.3
89	Republican	Rob Kauffman	Re-elected	Republican	Rob Kauffman	24,738	100.0
90	Republican	Todd Rock	Re-elected	Republican	Todd Rock	25,562	100.0
91	Republican	Dan Moul	Re-elected	Republican	Dan Moul	22,527	100.0
92	Republican	Scott Perry	Re-elected	Republican	Scott Perry	27,612	100.0
93	Republican	Ron Miller	Re-elected	Republican	Ron Miller	23,637	69.2
93	Republican	Ron Miller	Re-elected	Democratic	Darrell Raubenstine	10,527	30.8
94	Republican	Stan Saylor	Re-elected	Republican	Stan Saylor	21,754	73.2
94	Republican	Stan Saylor	Re-elected	Democratic	Deb Tillman	7,948	26.8
95	Democratic	Eugene DePasquale	Re-elected	Democratic	Eugene DePasquale	17,615	75.2
95	Democratic	Eugene DePasquale	Re-elected	Republican	Lon Emenheiser	5,814	24.8
96	Democratic	Mike Sturla	Re-elected	Democratic	Mike Sturla	18,410	100.0
97	Republican	John C. Bear	Re-elected	Republican	John C. Bear	26,240	100.0
98	Republican	David Hickernell	Re-elected	Democratic	Daniel Stephenson	8,633	31.3
98	Republican	David Hickernell	Re-elected	Republican	David Hickernell	18,979	68.7
99	Republican	Gordon Denlinger	Re-elected	Republican	Gordon Denlinger	19,316	100.0
100	Republican	Bryan Cutler	Re-elected	Republican	Bryan Cutler	18,921	100.0
101	Republican	Mauree Gingrich	Re-elected	Republican	Mauree Gingrich	24,298	100.0
102	Republican	RoseMarie Swanger	Re-elected	Republican	RoseMarie Swanger	23,546	100.0
103	Democratic	Ronald I. Buxton	Re-elected	Democratic	Ronald I. Buxton	21,282	100.0
104	Republican	Sue Helm	Re-elected	Democratic	Patricia Garcia	12,168	40.2
104	Republican	Sue Helm	Re-elected	Republican	Sue Helm	18,064	59.8
105	Republican	Ron Marsico	Re-elected	Republican	Ron Marsico	34,696	100.0
106	Republican	John D. Payne	Re-elected	Democratic	Phyllis Bennett	10,904	34.8
106	Republican	John D. Payne	Re-elected	Republican	John D. Payne	18,689	63.2
107	Democratic	Robert E. Belfanti, Jr.	Re-elected	Democratic	Robert E. Belfanti, Jr.	16,299	100.0
108	Republican	Merle Phillips	Re-elected	Democratic	Antonio D. Michetti	5,176	22.9
108	Republican	Merle Phillips	Re-elected	Republican	Merle Phillips	17,455	77.1
109	Republican	David R. Millard	Re-elected	Democratic	Nancy Schott		38.3
109	Republican	David R. Millard	Re-elected	Republican	David R. Millard	15,884	61.7
110	Democratic	Tina Pickett	Re-elected	Republican	Tina Pickett	21,701	100.0
111	Republican	Sandra Major	Re-elected	Republican	Sandra Major	20,94	87.1
111	Republican	Sandra Major	Re-elected	Green	Jay Sweeney	3,104	12.9
112	Democratic	Kenneth J. Smith	Re-elected	Democratic	Kenneth J. Smith	24,254	100.0
113	Democratic	Frank Andrews Shimkus	Defeated	Democratic	Kevin P. Murphy	14,872	52.4
113	Democratic	Frank Andrews Shimkus	Defeated	Republican	Frank Andrews Shimkus	13,524	47.6
114	Democratic	James Wansacz	Re-elected	Democratic	James Wansacz	23,876	100.0
115	Democratic	Edward Staback	Re-elected	Democratic	Edward Staback	23,719	100.0
116	Democratic	Todd A. Eachus	Re-elected	Democratic	Todd A. Eachus	20,990	100.0
117	Republican	Karen Boback	Re-elected	Democratic	Russ Bigus	7,728	29.1
117	Republican	Karen Boback	Re-elected	Republican	Karen Boback	18,832	70.9
118	Democratic	Michael B. Carroll	Re-elected	Democratic	Michael B. Carroll	20,279	100.0
119	Democratic	John T. Yudichak	Re-elected	Democratic	John T. Yudichak	19,341	100.0
120	Democratic	Phyllis Mundy	Re-elected	Democratic	Phyllis Mundy	21,340	100.0
121	Democratic	Eddie Day Pashinski	Re-elected	Democratic	Eddie Day Pashinski	17,745	100.0
122	Democratic	Keith R. McCall	Re-elected	Democratic	Keith R. McCall	16,884	64.0
122	Democratic	Keith R. McCall	Re-elected	Republican	Doyle M. Heffley	9,481	36.0
123	Democratic	Neal Goodman	Re-elected	Democratic	Neal Goodman	19,419	100.0
124	Republican	Dave Argall	Re-elected	Democratic	Bill Mackey	9,046	31.1
124	Republican	Dave Argall	Re-elected	Republican	Dave Argall	19,997	68.9
125	Democratic	Tim Seip	Re-elected	Democratic	Tim Seip	15,237	55.7
125	Democratic	Tim Seip	Re-elected	Republican	Gary L. Hornberger	12,100	44.3
126	Democratic	Dante Santoni, Jr.	Re-elected	Democratic	Dante Santoni, Jr.	21,674	100.0
127	Democratic	Thomas R. Caltagirone	Re-elected	Democratic	Thomas R. Caltagirone	16,031	100.0
128	Republican	Sam Rohrer	Re-elected	Democratic	John C. Woodward	15,371	48.2
128	Republican	Sam Rohrer	Re-elected	Republican	Sam Rohrer	16,509	51.8
129	Republican	Jim A. Cox	Re-elected	Republican	Jim A. Cox	22,536	100.0
130	Democratic	David R. Kessler	Re-elected	Democratic	David R. Kessler	17,675	56.6
130	Democratic	David R. Kessler	Re-elected	Republican	Richard L. Gokey	13,634	43.5
131	Republican	Karen D. Beyer	Re-elected	Republican	Karen D. Beyer	19,483	100.0
132	Democratic	Jennifer L. Mann	Re-elected	Democratic	Jennifer L. Mann	17,765	78.8
132	Democratic	Jennifer L. Mann	Re-elected	Republican	Mike Welsh	4,783	21.2
133	Democratic	Joseph F. Brennan	Re-elected	Democratic	Joseph F. Brennan	17,113	88.2
133	Democratic	Joseph F. Brennan	Re-elected	Green	Guy M. Gray	2,300	11.8
134	Republican	Doug Reichley	Re-elected	Republican	Doug Reichley	28,555	100.0
135	Democratic	Steve Samuelson	Re-elected	Democratic	Steve Samuelson	21,069	100.0
136	Democratic	Robert L. Freeman	Re-elected	Democratic	Robert L. Freeman	18,217	72.6
136	Democratic	Robert L. Freeman	Re-elected	Republican	Ron Shegda	6,878	27.4
137	Democratic	Richard T. Grucela	Re-elected	Democratic	Richard T. Grucela	23,217	100.0
138	Republican	Craig Dally	Re-elected	Republican	Craig Dally	23,402	100.0
139	Republican	Michael Peifer	Re-elected	Republican	Michael Peifer	21,286	100.0
140	Democratic	John Galloway	Re-elected	Democratic	John Galloway	21,512	100.0
141	Democratic	Anthony J. Melio	Re-elected	Democratic	Anthony J. Melio	21,445	100.0
142	Democratic	Christopher J. King	Defeated	Republican	Frank Farry	16,661	51.7
142	Democratic	Christopher J. King	Defeated	Democratic	Christopher J. King	15,577	48.3
143	Republican	Marguerite Quinn	Re-elected	Republican	Marguerite Quinn	20,383	58.0
143	Republican	Marguerite Quinn	Re-elected	Democratic	Diane Allison	13,703	39.0
143	Republican	Marguerite Quinn	Re-elected	Independent	Tom Lingenfelter	1,044	3.0
144	Republican	Kathy Watson	Re-elected	Democratic	Mithcell B. Myerson	12,241	35.2
144	Republican	Kathy Watson	Re-elected	Republican	Kathy Watson	22,541	64.8
145	Republican	Paul Clymer	Re-elected	Democratic	Tom Peterson	12,515	39.5
145	Republican	Paul Clymer	Re-elected	Republican	Paul Clymer	19,131	60.5
146	Republican	Tom Quigley	Re-elected	Democratic	James Prendergast	14,079	46.7
146	Republican	Tom Quigley	Re-elected	Republican	Tom Quigley	16,042	53.3
147	Republican	Bob Mensch	Re-elected	Democratic	Albert O. Van Anglen	11,290	36.6
147	Republican	Bob Mensch	Re-elected	Republican	Bob Mensch	19.599	65.4
148	Democratic	Michael F. Gerber	Re-elected	Democratic	Michael F. Gerber	23,957	66.7
148	Democratic	Michael F. Gerber	Re-elected	Republican	Matthew Maguire	11,939	33.3
149	Democratic	Daylin Leach	Elected to State Senate	Democratic	Tim Briggs	19,886	61.8
149	Democratic	Daylin Leach	Elected to State Senate	Republican	Lynne Lechter	12,270	38.2
150	Republican	Mike Vereb	Re-elected	Republican	Mike Vereb	17,740	56.7
150	Republican	Mike Vereb	Re-elected	Democratic	Kelbin Carolina	13,536	43.3
151	Democratic	Rick Taylor	Re-elected	Democratic	Rick Taylor	16,456	50.7
151	Democratic	Rick Taylor	Re-elected	Republican	Todd Stephens	16,025	49.3
152	Republican	Tom Murt	Re-elected	Republican	Tom Murt	18,583	60.1
152	Republican	Tom Murt	Re-elected	Democratic	Lisa Romaniello	12,347	39.9
153	Democratic	Josh Shapiro	Re-elected	Democratic	Josh Shapiro	32,744	100.0
154	Democratic	Lawrence H. Curry	Re-elected	Democratic	Lawrence H. Curry	27,283	100.0
155	Republican	Curt Schroder	Re-elected	Republican	Curt Schroder	26,761	100.0
156	Democratic	Barbara McIlvaine Smith	Re-elected	Democratic	Barbara McIlvaine Smith	18,143	53.3
156	Democratic	Barbara McIlvaine Smith	Re-elected	Republican	Shannon Royer	15,909	46.7
157	Republican	Carole A. Rubley	Retired	Democratic	Paul J. Drucker	17,843	50.9
157	Republican	Carole A. Rubley	Retired	Republican	Guy Ciarrocchi	17,229	49.1
158	Republican	L. Chris Ross	Re-elected	Republican	L. Chris Ross	24,695	100.0
159	Democratic	Thaddeus Kirkland	Re-elected	Democratic	Thaddeus Kirkland	18,352	81.5
159	Democratic	Thaddeus Kirkland	Re-elected	Republican	Thomas G. Deitman	4,160	18.5
160	Republican	Stephen Barrar	Re-elected	Republican	Stephen Barrar	27,448	100.0
161	Democratic	Bryan Lentz	Re-elected	Democratic	Bryan Lentz	18,284	55.0
161	Democratic	Bryan Lentz	Re-elected	Republican	Joseph Hackett	14,954	45.0
162	Republican	Ron Raymond	Retired	Republican	Nick Miccarelli	15,775	57.4
162	Republican	Ron Raymond	Retired	Democratic	John DeFrancisco	11,688	42.6
163	Republican	Nicholas Micozzie	Re-elected	Republican	Nicholas Micozzie	17,094	58.6
163	Republican	Nicholas Micozzie	Re-elected	Democratic	Kevin M. Lee	12,071	41.4
164	Republican	Mario Civera, Jr.	Re-elected	Republican	Mario Civera, Jr.	25,233	100.0
165	Republican	Bill Adolph, Jr.	Re-elected	Republican	Bill Adolph, Jr.	19,330	62.2
165	Republican	Bill Adolph, Jr.	Re-elected	Democratic	Tom Quinn	11,727	37.8
166	Democratic	Greg Vitali	Re-elected	Democratic	Greg Vitali	22,923	68.2
166	Democratic	Greg Vitali	Re-elected	Republican	Stephen Demilo	10,698	31.8
167	Republican	Duane Milne	Re-elected	Republican	Duane Milne	20,256	56.4
167	Republican	Duane Milne	Re-elected	Democratic	Carol Palmaccio	15,636	43.6
168	Republican	Tom Killion	Re-elected	Republican	Tom Killion	20,640	60.6
168	Republican	Tom Killion	Re-elected	Democratic	Ian Thomas	13,394	49.4
169	Republican	Dennis M. O'Brien	Re-elected	Republican	Dennis M. O'Brien	25,789	100.0
170	Republican	George T. Kenney, Jr.	Retired	Democratic	Brendan F. Boyle	15,442	59.2
170	Republican	George T. Kenney, Jr.	Retired	Republican	Matt Taubenberger	10,632	40.8
171	Republican	Kerry Benninghoff	Re-elected	Republican	Kerry Benninghoff	21,676	65.4
171	Republican	Kerry Benninghoff	Re-elected	Democratic	Joanne Tosti-Vasey	11,472	34.6
172	Republican	John M. Perzel	Re-elected	Republican	John M. Perzel	17,992	65.7
172	Republican	John M. Perzel	Re-elected	Democratic	Richard B. Costello	9,403	34.3
173	Democratic	Michael P. McGeehan	Re-elected	Democratic	Michael P. McGeehan	16,870	82.3
173	Democratic	Michael P. McGeehan	Re-elected	Republican	Belinda C. Nelson	3,620	17.7
174	Democratic	John P. Sabatina, Jr.	Re-elected	Democratic	John P. Sabatina, Jr.	18,477	100.0
175	Democratic	Michael H. O'Brien	Re-elected	Democratic	Michael H. O'Brien	23,726	100.0
176	Republican	Mario Scavello	Re-elected	Democratic	Mario Scavello	24,476	100.0
177	Republican	John J. Taylor	Re-elected	Republican	John J. Taylor	13,443	59.2
177	Republican	John J. Taylor	Re-elected	Democratic	Harry L. Enggasser	9,265	40.8
178	Republican	Scott Petri	Re-elected	Republican	Scott Petri	20,539	57.4
178	Republican	Scott Petri	Re-elected	Democratic	Steven Rovner	14,339	40.1
178	Republican	Scott Petri	Re-elected	Independent	Bill O'Neill	904	2.5
179	Democratic	Tony Payton	Re-elected	Democratic	Tony Payton	18,248	90.0
179	Democratic	Tony Payton	Re-elected	Republican	William Kennedy	2,027	10.0
180	Democratic	Angel Cruz	Re-elected	Democratic	Angel Cruz	16,920	98.2
180	Democratic	Angel Cruz	Re-elected	Libertarian	Erik Sanchez	317	1.8
181	Democratic	Curtis Thomas	Re-elected	Democratic	Curtis Thomas	25,343	100.0
182	Democratic	Babette Josephs	Re-elected	Democratic	Babette Josephs	25,255	81.4
182	Democratic	Babette Josephs	Re-elected	Republican	Wally Zimolong	5,764	18.6
183	Republican	Julie Harhart	Re-elected	Republican	Julie Harhart	21,628	87.1
183	Republican	Julie Harhart	Re-elected	Constitution	Carl C. Edwards	3,214	12.9
184	Democratic	William F. Keller	Re-elected	Democratic	William F. Keller	18,406	78.3
184	Democratic	William F. Keller	Re-elected	Republican	Anthony Biondo	5,090	21.7
185	Democratic	Robert C. Donatucci	Re-elected	Democratic	Robert C. Donatucci	20,511	85.1
185	Democratic	Robert C. Donatucci	Re-elected	Republican	Kamalah K. Brown	3,564	14.9
186	Democratic	Harold James	Lost primary	Democratic	Kenyatta Johnson	25,113	100.0
187	Republican	Carl W. Mantz	Retired	Republican	Gary Day	15,956	52.3
187	Republican	Carl W. Mantz	Retired	Democratic	John R. Ritter	14,538	47.7
188	Democratic	James R. Roebuck, Jr.	Re-elected	Republican	James R. Roebuck, Jr.	24,690	100.0
189	Democratic	John Siptroth	Re-elected	Democratic	John Siptroth	17,444	64.0
189	Democratic	John Siptroth	Re-elected	Republican	John Sivick	9,825	36.0
190	Democratic	Thomas W. Blackwell IV	Lost reelection as write-in	Democratic	Vanessa L. Brown	26,466	98.7
190	Democratic	Thomas W. Blackwell IV	Lost reelection as write-in	Republican	Rahim Foreman	361	1.3
191	Democratic	Ronald G. Waters	Re-elected	Democratic	Ronald G. Waters	24,142	100.0
192	Democratic	Louise Bishop	Re-elected	Democratic	Louise Bishop	27,347	100.0
193	Republican	Steven Nickol	Retired	Democratic	Neil F. Clifford	8,914	32.7
193	Republican	Steven Nickol	Retired	Republican	Will Tallman	18,327	67.3
194	Democratic	Kathy Manderino	Re-elected	Democratic	Kathy Manderino	21,701	78.1
194	Democratic	Kathy Manderino	Re-elected	Republican	Thomas C. Rolland	6,100	21.9
195	Democratic	Frank L. Oliver	Re-elected	Democratic	Frank L. Oliver	24,990	90.6
195	Democratic	Frank L. Oliver	Re-elected	Republican	W. James Kernaghan	2,600	9.4
196	Republican	Beverly Mackereth	Retired	Republican	Seth Grove	24,916	100.0
197	Democratic	Jewell Williams	Re-elected	Democratic	Jewell Williams	27,055	100.0
198	Democratic	Rosita Youngblood	Re-elected	Democratic	Rosita Youngblood	25,519	100.0
199	Republican	Will Gabig	Re-elected	Democratic	Greg Scudder	9,818	35.3
199	Republican	Will Gabig	Re-elected	Republican	Will Gabig	18,014	64.7
200	Democratic	Cherelle Parker	Re-elected	Democratic	Cherelle Parker	28,944	100.0
201	Democratic	John L. Myers	Re-elected	Democratic	John L. Myers	26,519	97.9
201	Democratic	John L. Myers	Re-elected	Republican	Joseph L. Messa	571	2.1
202	Democratic	Mark B. Cohen	Re-elected	Democratic	Mark B. Cohen	21,597	100.0
203	Democratic	Dwight E. Evans	Re-elected	Democratic	Dwight E. Evans	26,047	100.0
