= 2016 Pennsylvania House of Representatives election =

- November 8, 2016

All 203 seats in the Pennsylvania House of Representatives 102 seats needed for a majority
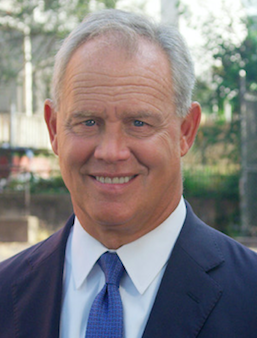

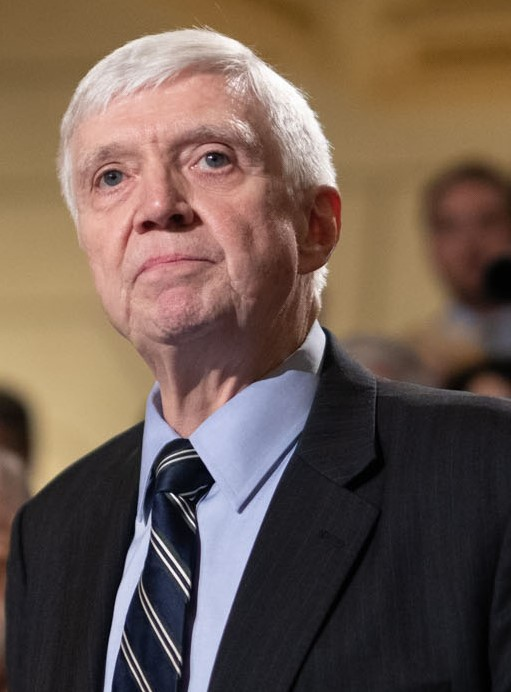
| | Majority party | Minority party |
|---|---|---|
| Leader | Mike Turzai | Frank Dermody |
| Party | Republican | Democratic |
| Leader since | January 6, 2015 | January 4, 2011 |
| Leader's seat | 28th | 33rd |
| Seats before | 119 | 84 |
| Seats won | 121 | 82 |
| Seat change | ▲2 | ▼2 |
| Popular vote | 2,852,921 | 2,755,058 |
| Percentage | 50.49% | 48.76% |
| Swing | ▼5.55% | ▲5.43% |
- Results: Republican hold Republican gain Democratic hold Democratic gain
Speaker before election
Mike Turzai
Republican
Elected Speaker
Mike Turzai
Republican

The 2016 elections for the Pennsylvania House of Representatives were held on November 8, 2016, with all districts being contested. The primary elections were held on April 26, 2016. The term of office for those elected in 2016 began when the House of Representatives convened in January 2017. Pennsylvania state representatives are elected for two-year terms, with all 203 seats up for election every two years.

== Overview ==
| Affiliation | Candidates | Votes | Vote % | Seats Won |
|---|---|---|---|---|
| Republican | 157 | 2,852,921 | 50.49% | 121 (▲2) |
| Democratic | 152 | 2,755,058 | 48.76% | 82 (▼2) |
| Independent | 5 | 22,711 | 0.40% | 0 |
| Libertarian | 4 | 8,354 | 0.15% | 0 |
| Green | 3 | 5,730 | 0.10% | 0 |
| Constitution | 1 | 5,429 | 0.10% | 0 |
| Total | 322 | 5,650,203 | 100% | 203 |

Popular vote
| Republican | 50.49% |
| Democratic | 48.76% |
| Other | 0.75% |

House seats
| Republican | 59.60% |
| Democratic | 40.40% |

== Predictions ==
| Source | Ranking | As of |
|---|---|---|
| Governing | Likely R | October 12, 2016 |

== Results by district ==
| District | Party | Incumbent | Status | Party | Candidate | Votes | % |
|---|---|---|---|---|---|---|---|
| 1 | Democratic | Pat Harkins | Re-elected | Democratic | Pat Harkins | 14,785 | 72.92 |
| 1 | Democratic | Pat Harkins | Re-elected | Republican | William Crotty | 5,491 | 27.08 |
| 2 | Democratic | Florindo Fabrizio | Re-elected | Democratic | Florindo Fabrizio | 16,051 | 63.76 |
| 2 | Democratic | Florindo Fabrizio | Re-elected | Republican | Patrick J. Fuller | 9,124 | 36.24 |
| 3 | Democratic | Ryan Bizzarro | Re-elected | Democratic | Ryan Bizzarro | 19,595 | 59.94 |
| 3 | Democratic | Ryan Bizzarro | Re-elected | Republican | Gregory S. Lucas | 13,094 | 40.06 |
| 4 | Republican | Curt Sonney | Re-elected | Republican | Curt Sonney | 22,790 | 100.00 |
| 5 | Republican | Barry Jozwiak | Re-elected | Republican | Barry Jozwiak | 23,936 | 100.00 |
| 6 | Republican | Brad Roae | Re-elected | Republican | Brad Roae | 17,197 | 60.00 |
| 6 | Republican | Brad Roae | Re-elected | Democratic | Peter Andrew Zimmer | 11,467 | 40.00 |
| 7 | Democratic | Mark Longietti | Re-elected | Democratic | Mark Longietti | 27,497 | 100.00 |
| 8 | Republican | Tedd Nesbit | Re-elected | Republican | Tedd Nesbit | 18,853 | 66.62 |
| 8 | Republican | Tedd Nesbit | Re-elected | Democratic | Judith D. Hines | 9,446 | 33.38 |
| 9 | Democratic | Chris Sainato | Re-elected | Democratic | Chris Sainato | 24,848 | 100.00 |
| 10 | Democratic | Jaret Gibbons | Defeated | Republican | Aaron Bernstine | 15,807 | 58.48 |
| 10 | Democratic | Jaret Gibbons | Defeated | Democratic | Jaret Gibbons | 11,224 | 41.52 |
| 11 | Republican | Brian Ellis | Re-elected | Republican | Brian Ellis | 24,183 | 100.00 |
| 12 | Republican | Daryl Metcalfe | Re-elected | Republican | Daryl Metcalfe | 24,405 | 67.84 |
| 12 | Republican | Daryl Metcalfe | Re-elected | Democratic | Christian M. Rieger | 11,572 | 32.16 |
| 13 | Republican | John Lawrence | Re-elected | Republican | John Lawrence | 18,446 | 62.49 |
| 13 | Republican | John Lawrence | Re-elected | Democratic | Nancy Dean | 11,074 | 37.51 |
| 14 | Republican | Jim Marshall | Re-elected | Republican | Jim Marshall | 24,499 | 100.00 |
| 15 | Republican | Jim Christiana | Re-elected | Republican | Jim Christiana | 19,248 | 62.97 |
| 15 | Republican | Jim Christiana | Re-elected | Democratic | Michael Rossi | 11,318 | 37.03 |
| 16 | Democratic | Rob Matzie | Re-elected | Democratic | Rob Matzie | 24,078 | 100.00 |
| 17 | Republican | Parke Wentling | Re-elected | Republican | Parke Wentling | 18,937 | 71.27 |
| 17 | Republican | Parke Wentling | Re-elected | Democratic | Wayne Hanson | 7,633 | 28.73 |
| 18 | Republican | Gene DiGirolamo | Re-elected | Republican | Gene DiGirolamo | 19,506 | 100.00 |
| 19 | Democratic | Jake Wheatley | Re-elected | Democratic | Jake Wheatley | 9,404 | 86.65 |
| 19 | Democratic | Jake Wheatley | Re-elected | Republican | Mark Brentley | 1,449 | 13.35 |
| 20 | Democratic | Adam Ravenstahl | Re-elected | Democratic | Adam Ravenstahl | 23,000 | 80.90 |
| 20 | Democratic | Adam Ravenstahl | Re-elected | Constitution | Jim Barr | 5,429 | 19.10 |
| 21 | Democratic | Dom Costa | Re-elected | Democratic | Dom Costa | 26,453 | 100.00 |
| 22 | Democratic | Peter Schweyer | Re-elected | Democratic | Peter Schweyer | 15,222 | 100.00 |
| 23 | Democratic | Dan Frankel | Re-elected | Democratic | Dan Frankel | 28,902 | 100.00 |
| 24 | Democratic | Ed Gainey | Re-elected | Democratic | Ed Gainey | 30,562 | 100.00 |
| 25 | Democratic | Joe Markosek | Re-elected | Democratic | Joe Markosek | 19,218 | 62.41 |
| 25 | Democratic | Joe Markosek | Re-elected | Republican | John Ritter | 11,573 | 37.59 |
| 26 | Republican | Tim Hennessey | Re-elected | Republican | Tim Hennessey | 22,635 | 100.00 |
| 27 | Democratic | Dan Deasy | Re-elected | Democratic | Dan Deasy | 24,380 | 100.00 |
| 28 | Republican | Mike Turzai | Re-elected | Republican | Mike Turzai | 24,327 | 65.25 |
| 28 | Republican | Mike Turzai | Re-elected | Democratic | John Craig Hammond | 12,958 | 34.75 |
| 29 | Republican | Bernie O'Neill | Re-elected | Republican | Bernie O'Neill | 22,018 | 61.94 |
| 29 | Republican | Bernie O'Neill | Re-elected | Democratic | Lawrence A. Mullins | 13,529 | 38.06 |
| 30 | Republican | Hal English | Re-elected | Republican | Hal English | 35,575 | 100.00 |
| 31 | Democratic | Steve Santarsiero | Ran for Congress | Democratic | Perry Warren | 19,071 | 50.10 |
| 31 | Democratic | Steve Santarsiero | Ran for Congress | Republican | Ryan W Gallagher | 18,996 | 49.90 |
| 32 | Democratic | Tony DeLuca | Re-elected | Democratic | Tony DeLuca | 28,716 | 100.00 |
| 33 | Democratic | Frank Dermody | Re-elected | Democratic | Frank Dermody | 21,589 | 100.00 |
| 34 | Democratic | Paul Costa | Re-elected | Democratic | Paul Costa | 27,737 | 100.00 |
| 35 | Democratic | Marc Gergely | Re-elected | Democratic | Marc Gergely | 16,170 | 62.50 |
| 35 | Democratic | Marc Gergely | Re-elected | Republican | Valian Fawn Walker-Montgomery | 9,702 | 37.50 |
| 36 | Democratic | Harry Readshaw | Re-elected | Democratic | Harry Readshaw | 24,680 | 100.00 |
| 37 | Republican | Mindy Fee | Re-elected | Republican | Mindy Fee | 24,680 | 100.00 |
| 38 | Democratic | Bill Kortz | Re-elected | Democratic | Bill Kortz | 21,271 | 65.65 |
| 38 | Democratic | Bill Kortz | Re-elected | Republican | Rod A. Salka Jr. | 11,130 | 34.35 |
| 39 | Republican | Rick Saccone | Re-elected | Republican | Rick Saccone | 22,034 | 68.40 |
| 39 | Republican | Rick Saccone | Re-elected | Democratic | Peter Thaddeus Kobylinski | 10,180 | 31.60 |
| 40 | Republican | John Maher | Re-elected | Republican | John Maher | 24,389 | 65.03 |
| 40 | Republican | John Maher | Re-elected | Democratic | Andrew J. Zahalsky | 13,115 | 34.97 |
| 41 | Republican | Brett Miller | Re-elected | Republican | Brett Miller | 21,537 | 61.95 |
| 41 | Republican | Brett Miller | Re-elected | Democratic | Nicholas F. Selch | 13,227 | 38.05 |
| 42 | Democratic | Dan Miller | Re-elected | Democratic | Dan Miller | 26,759 | 100.00 |
| 43 | Republican | Keith Greiner | Re-elected | Republican | Keith Greiner | 19,557 | 66.96 |
| 43 | Republican | Keith Greiner | Re-elected | Democratic | Steven Patrick Elliott | 9,649 | 33.04 |
| 44 | Republican | Mark Mustio | Re-elected | Republican | Mark Mustio | 27,715 | 100.00 |
| 45 | Democratic | Nick Kotik | Retired | Democratic | Anita Astorino Kulik | 29,949 | 100.00 |
| 46 | Republican | Jason Ortitay | Re-elected | Republican | Jason Ortitay | 20,056 | 60.24 |
| 46 | Republican | Jason Ortitay | Re-elected | Democratic | Joseph R Szpara | 13,238 | 39.76 |
| 47 | Republican | Keith Gillespie | Re-elected | Republican | Keith Gillespie | 24,026 | 100.00 |
| 48 | Democratic | Brandon Neuman | Re-elected | Democratic | Brandon Neuman | 21,335 | 100.00 |
| 49 | Democratic | Peter Daley | Retired | Republican | Donald Cook | 13,318 | 54.10 |
| 49 | Democratic | Peter Daley | Retired | Democratic | Alan D. Benyak | 11,667 | 45.90 |
| 50 | Democratic | Pam Snyder | Re-elected | Democratic | Pam Snyder | 13,044 | 53.33 |
| 50 | Democratic | Pam Snyder | Re-elected | Republican | Elizabeth L. Rohanna McClure | 11,417 | 46.67 |
| 51 | Democratic | Tim Mahoney | Defeated | Republican | Matt Dowling | 13,318 | 53.07 |
| 51 | Democratic | Tim Mahoney | Defeated | Democratic | Tim Mahoney | 11,779 | 46.93 |
| 52 | Republican | Ryan Warner | Re-elected | Republican | Ryan Warner | 16,578 | 63.91 |
| 52 | Republican | Ryan Warner | Re-elected | Democratic | James M. Mari | 9,360 | 36.09 |
| 53 | Republican | Bob Godshall | Re-elected | Republican | Bob Godshall | 17,964 | 59.54 |
| 53 | Republican | Bob Godshall | Re-elected | Democratic | Leon Angelichio | 12,205 | 40.46 |
| 54 | Republican | Eli Evankovich | Re-elected | Republican | Eli Evankovich | 27,008 | 100.00 |
| 55 | Democratic | Joe Petrarca | Re-elected | Democratic | Joe Petrarca | 15,554 | 56.39 |
| 55 | Democratic | Joe Petrarca | Re-elected | Republican | Michael Marion Geiselhart | 12,028 | 43.61 |
| 56 | Republican | George Dunbar | Re-elected | Republican | George Dunbar | 27,727 | 100.00 |
| 57 | Republican | Eric Nelson | Re-elected | Republican | Eric Nelson | 20,396 | 65.15 |
| 57 | Republican | Eric Nelson | Re-elected | Democratic | Linda L Iezzi | 10,909 | 34.85 |
| 58 | Democratic | Ted Harhai | Retired | Republican | Justin Walsh | 17,854 | 61.54 |
| 58 | Democratic | Ted Harhai | Retired | Democratic | Mary E. Popovich | 11,159 | 38.46 |
| 59 | Republican | Mike Reese | Re-elected | Republican | Mike Reese | 27,700 | 100.00 |
| 60 | Republican | Jeff Pyle | Re-elected | Republican | Jeff Pyle | 23,937 | 86.85 |
| 60 | Republican | Jeff Pyle | Re-elected | Green | Gabe Lytle | 3,625 | 13.15 |
| 61 | Republican | Kate Harper | Re-elected | Republican | Kate Harper | 20,458 | 56.53 |
| 61 | Republican | Kate Harper | Re-elected | Democratic | Robert Wilkinson | 15,732 | 43.47 |
| 62 | Republican | Dave Reed | Re-elected | Republican | Dave Reed | 18,909 | 68.88 |
| 62 | Republican | Dave Reed | Re-elected | Democratic | Patrick S. Edwards | 8,544 | 31.12 |
| 63 | Republican | Donna Oberlander | Re-elected | Republican | Donna Oberlander | 19,533 | 75.64 |
| 63 | Republican | Donna Oberlander | Re-elected | Democratic | Joseph William Billotte II | 6,289 | 24.36 |
| 64 | Republican | Lee James | Re-elected | Republican | Lee James | 16,082 | 62.48 |
| 64 | Republican | Lee James | Re-elected | Democratic | John Kluck | 8,987 | 34.91 |
| 64 | Republican | Lee James | Re-elected | Green | Michael Bagdes-Canning | 672 | 2.61 |
| 65 | Republican | Kathy Rapp | Re-elected | Republican | Kathy Rapp | 18,248 | 69.97 |
| 65 | Republican | Kathy Rapp | Re-elected | Democratic | Troy Morrow Clawson | 7,830 | 30.03 |
| 66 | Republican | Cris Dush | Re-elected | Republican | Cris Dush | 23,951 | 100.00 |
| 67 | Republican | Martin Causer | Re-elected | Republican | Martin Causer | 22,746 | 100.00 |
| 68 | Republican | Matt Baker | Re-elected | Republican | Matt Baker | 24,920 | 100.00 |
| 69 | Republican | Carl Walker Metzgar | Re-elected | Republican | Carl Walker Metzgar | 28,988 | 100.00 |
| 70 | Democratic | Matt Bradford | Re-elected | Democratic | Matt Bradford | 18,443 | 66.99 |
| 70 | Democratic | Matt Bradford | Re-elected | Republican | Charles E Springer Jr. | 9,084 | 33.01 |
| 71 | Democratic | Bryan Barbin | Re-elected | Democratic | Bryan Barbin | 16,557 | 58.98 |
| 71 | Democratic | Bryan Barbin | Re-elected | Republican | Mark Amsdell | 11,515 | 41.02 |
| 72 | Democratic | Frank Burns | Re-elected | Democratic | Frank Burns | 16,361 | 57.55 |
| 72 | Democratic | Frank Burns | Re-elected | Republican | Cecelia E. Houser | 12,066 | 42.45 |
| 73 | Republican | Tommy Sankey | Re-elected | Republican | Tommy Sankey | 18,631 | 71.11 |
| 73 | Republican | Tommy Sankey | Re-elected | Democratic | William Frederick Weaver | 7,571 | 28.89 |
| 74 | Republican | Harry Lewis | Re-elected | Republican | Harry Lewis | 14,776 | 51.27 |
| 74 | Republican | Harry Lewis | Re-elected | Democratic | Joshua Maxwell | 14,045 | 48.73 |
| 75 | Republican | Matt Gabler | Re-elected | Republican | Matt Gabler | 21,081 | 72.73 |
| 75 | Republican | Matt Gabler | Re-elected | Democratic | Jay Notarianni | 7,904 | 27.27 |
| 76 | Democratic | Mike Hanna | Re-elected | Democratic | Mike Hanna | 13,213 | 52.16 |
| 76 | Democratic | Mike Hanna | Re-elected | Republican | Stephanie Paige Borowicz | 12,121 | 47.84 |
| 77 | Democratic | Scott Conklin | Re-elected | Democratic | Scott Conklin | 25,387 | 100.00 |
| 78 | Republican | Jesse Topper | Re-elected | Republican | Jesse Topper | 26,565 | 100.00 |
| 79 | Republican | John McGinnis | Re-elected | Republican | John McGinnis | 20,241 | 100.00 |
| 80 | Republican | Judy Ward | Re-elected | Republican | Judy Ward | 26,397 | 100.00 |
| 81 | Republican | Rich Irvin | Re-elected | Republican | Rich Irvin | 18,974 | 63.74 |
| 81 | Republican | Rich Irvin | Re-elected | Democratic | Richard J. Rogers | 10,796 | 36.26 |
| 82 | Republican | Adam Harris | Re-elected | Republican | Adam Harris | 21,861 | 100.00 |
| 83 | Republican | Jeff Wheeland | Re-elected | Republican | Jeff Wheeland | 19,901 | 100.00 |
| 84 | Republican | Garth Everett | Re-elected | Republican | Garth Everett | 24,765 | 100.00 |
| 85 | Republican | Fred Keller | Re-elected | Republican | Fred Keller | 21,304 | 100.00 |
| 86 | Republican | Mark Keller | Re-elected | Republican | Mark Keller | 25,021 | 100.00 |
| 87 | Republican | Greg Rothman | Re-elected | Republican | Greg Rothman | 22,991 | 62.68 |
| 87 | Republican | Greg Rothman | Re-elected | Democratic | James Henry Massey | 13,687 | 37.32 |
| 88 | Republican | Sheryl Delozier | Re-elected | Republican | Sheryl Delozier | 20,518 | 65.10 |
| 88 | Republican | Sheryl Delozier | Re-elected | Democratic | Christopher M. Cowan | 11,001 | 34.90 |
| 89 | Republican | Rob Kauffman | Re-elected | Republican | Rob Kauffman | 21,532 | 72.50 |
| 89 | Republican | Rob Kauffman | Re-elected | Democratic | Christine L. Tolbert | 8,167 | 27.50 |
| 90 | Republican | Paul Schemel | Re-elected | Republican | Paul Schemel | 25,846 | 100.00 |
| 91 | Republican | Dan Moul | Re-elected | Republican | Dan Moul | 20,069 | 66.49 |
| 91 | Republican | Dan Moul | Re-elected | Democratic | Denise L. Weldon-Siviy | 10,113 | 33.51 |
| 92 | Republican | Mike Regan | Elected to State Senate | Republican | Dawn Keefer | 22,517 | 72.75 |
| 92 | Republican | Mike Regan | Elected to State Senate | Independent | Kate McGraw | 8,435 | 27.25 |
| 93 | Republican | Kristin Phillips-Hill | Re-elected | Republican | Kristin Phillips-Hill | 26,741 | 100.00 |
| 94 | Republican | Stan Saylor | Re-elected | Republican | Stan Saylor | 23,701 | 100.00 |
| 95 | Democratic | Kevin Schreiber | Retired | Democratic | Carol Hill-Evans | 13,726 | 61.04 |
| 95 | Democratic | Kevin Schreiber | Retired | Republican | Joel L. Sears | 8,762 | 38.96 |
| 96 | Democratic | Mike Sturla | Re-elected | Democratic | Mike Sturla | 17,340 | 73.25 |
| 96 | Democratic | Mike Sturla | Re-elected | Republican | Robert F. Bigley Jr. | 6,332 | 26.75 |
| 97 | Republican | Steven Mentzer | Re-elected | Republican | Steven Mentzer | 22,952 | 63.13 |
| 97 | Republican | Steven Mentzer | Re-elected | Democratic | Charles J. Klein | 13,403 | 36.87 |
| 98 | Republican | Dave Hickernell | Re-elected | Republican | Dave Hickernell | 23,545 | 100.00 |
| 99 | Republican | David Zimmerman | Re-elected | Republican | David Zimmerman | 17,945 | 74.26 |
| 99 | Republican | David Zimmerman | Re-elected | Democratic | Duane A. Groff | 6,219 | 25.74 |
| 100 | Republican | Bryan Cutler | Re-elected | Republican | Bryan Cutler | 17,416 | 73.93 |
| 100 | Republican | Bryan Cutler | Re-elected | Democratic | Dale Allen Hamby | 6,140 | 26.07 |
| 101 | Republican | Mauree Gingrich | Retired | Republican | Frank Ryan | 19,800 | 67.00 |
| 101 | Republican | Mauree Gingrich | Retired | Democratic | Lorraine Helen Scudder | 9,752 | 33.00 |
| 102 | Republican | Russ Diamond | Re-elected | Republican | Russ Diamond | 19,858 | 69.91 |
| 102 | Republican | Russ Diamond | Re-elected | Democratic | Jake Long | 8,549 | 30.09 |
| 103 | Democratic | Patty Kim | Re-elected | Democratic | Patty Kim | 20,864 | 100.00 |
| 104 | Republican | Sue Helm | Re-elected | Republican | Sue Helm | 19,024 | 57.71 |
| 104 | Republican | Sue Helm | Re-elected | Democratic | Jody L. Rebarchak | 13,940 | 42.29 |
| 105 | Republican | Ron Marsico | Re-elected | Republican | Ron Marsico | 34,353 | 100.00 |
| 106 | Republican | John Payne | Retired | Republican | Thomas Mehaffie | 21,916 | 100.00 |
| 107 | Republican | Kurt Masser | Re-elected | Republican | Kurt Masser | 18,084 | 71.61 |
| 107 | Republican | Kurt Masser | Re-elected | Democratic | Michael L. Krankowski | 7,170 | 28.39 |
| 108 | Republican | Lynda Schlegel-Culver | Re-elected | Republican | Lynda Schlegel-Culver | 19,576 | 76.65 |
| 108 | Republican | Lynda Schlegel-Culver | Re-elected | Democratic | John E. Deppen | 5,963 | 23.35 |
| 109 | Republican | David Millard | Re-elected | Republican | David Millard | 16,392 | 62.04 |
| 109 | Republican | David Millard | Re-elected | Democratic | Edward Thomas Sanders III | 8,537 | 32.31 |
| 109 | Republican | David Millard | Re-elected | Independent | Denise Bedio | 1,494 | 5.65 |
| 110 | Republican | Tina Pickett | Re-elected | Republican | Tina Pickett | 22,319 | 100.00 |
| 111 | Republican | Sandra Major | Retired | Republican | Jon Fritz | 22,335 | 100.00 |
| 112 | Democratic | Frank Farina | Defeated in primary | Democratic | Kevin Haggerty | 15,643 | 53.09 |
| 112 | Democratic | Frank Farina | Defeated in primary | Republican | Ernest D. Lemoncelli | 13,824 | 46.91 |
| 113 | Democratic | Marty Flynn | Re-elected | Democratic | Marty Flynn | 18,609 | 69.29 |
| 113 | Democratic | Marty Flynn | Re-elected | Republican | David Andrew Burgerhoff | 8,248 | 30.71 |
| 114 | Democratic | Sid Michaels Kavulich | Re-elected | Democratic | Sid Michaels Kavulich | 21,450 | 67.15 |
| 114 | Democratic | Sid Michaels Kavulich | Re-elected | Republican | Cheryl Lynn Scandale-Murnin | 10,495 | 32.85 |
| 115 | Republican | David Parker | Defeated | Democratic | Maureen Madden | 11,845 | 51.92 |
| 115 | Republican | David Parker | Defeated | Republican | David Parker | 10,969 | 48.08 |
| 116 | Republican | Tarah Toohil | Re-elected | Republican | Tarah Toohil | 16,695 | 70.19 |
| 116 | Republican | Tarah Toohil | Re-elected | Democratic | Gary Gregory | 7,089 | 29.81 |
| 117 | Republican | Karen Boback | Re-elected | Republican | Karen Boback | 24,869 | 87.67 |
| 117 | Republican | Karen Boback | Re-elected | Independent | Louis R. Jasikoff | 2,065 | 7.28 |
| 117 | Republican | Karen Boback | Re-elected | Green | John J. Sweeney | 1,433 | 5.05 |
| 118 | Democratic | Mike Carroll | Re-elected | Democratic | Mike Carroll | 20,627 | 100.00 |
| 119 | Democratic | Jerry Mullery | Re-elected | Democratic | Jerry Mullery | 13,760 | 56.24 |
| 119 | Democratic | Jerry Mullery | Re-elected | Republican | Justin Valera Behrens | 10,707 | 43.76 |
| 120 | Republican | Aaron Kaufer | Re-elected | Republican | Aaron Kaufer | 18,843 | 67.85 |
| 120 | Republican | Aaron Kaufer | Re-elected | Democratic | Robert John McDonald | 8,929 | 32.15 |
| 121 | Democratic | Eddie Day Pashinski | Re-elected | Democratic | Eddie Day Pashinski | 14,940 | 78.10 |
| 121 | Democratic | Eddie Day Pashinski | Re-elected | Libertarian | Betsy Summers | 4,189 | 21.90 |
| 122 | Republican | Doyle Heffley | Re-elected | Republican | Doyle Heffley | 16,269 | 59.48 |
| 122 | Republican | Doyle Heffley | Re-elected | Democratic | Neil Makhija | 10,569 | 39.51 |
| 122 | Republican | Doyle Heffley | Re-elected | Libertarian | Matthew C. Schutter | 514 | 1.88 |
| 123 | Democratic | Neal Goodman | Re-elected | Democratic | Neal Goodman | 17,942 | 100.00 |
| 124 | Republican | Jerry Knowles | Re-elected | Republican | Jerry Knowles | 26,187 | 100.00 |
| 125 | Republican | Mike Tobash | Re-elected | Republican | Mike Tobash | 24,115 | 100.00 |
| 126 | Democratic | Mark Rozzi | Re-elected | Democratic | Mark Rozzi | 20,479 | 100.00 |
| 127 | Democratic | Tom Caltagirone | Re-elected | Democratic | Tom Caltagirone | 13,881 | 100.00 |
| 128 | Republican | Mark Gillen | Re-elected | Republican | Mark Gillen | 25,847 | 100.00 |
| 129 | Republican | Jim Cox | Re-elected | Republican | Jim Cox | 24,900 | 100.00 |
| 130 | Republican | David Maloney | Re-elected | Republican | David Maloney | 24,860 | 100.00 |
| 131 | Republican | Justin Simmons | Re-elected | Republican | Justin Simmons | 21,379 | 62.83 |
| 131 | Republican | Justin Simmons | Re-elected | Democratic | Joanne E. Jackson | 12,649 | 37.17 |
| 132 | Democratic | Mike Schlossberg | Re-elected | Democratic | Mike Schlossberg | 16,065 | 67.13 |
| 132 | Democratic | Mike Schlossberg | Re-elected | Republican | Benjamin B. Long | 7,866 | 32.87 |
| 133 | Democratic | Dan McNeill | Re-elected | Democratic | Dan McNeill | 15,102 | 56.31 |
| 133 | Democratic | Dan McNeill | Re-elected | Republican | David Molony | 10,648 | 39.70 |
| 133 | Democratic | Dan McNeill | Re-elected | Libertarian | Alexander V. Humanick | 1,068 | 3.98 |
| 134 | Republican | Ryan Mackenzie | Re-elected | Republican | Ryan Mackenzie | 25,676 | 100.00 |
| 135 | Democratic | Steve Samuelson | Re-elected | Democratic | Steve Samuelson | 19,431 | 100.00 |
| 136 | Democratic | Bob Freeman | Re-elected | Democratic | Bob Freeman | 18,345 | 100.00 |
| 137 | Republican | Joe Emrick | Re-elected | Republican | Joe Emrick | 20,039 | 65.58 |
| 137 | Republican | Joe Emrick | Re-elected | Democratic | Dave D. Mattei | 10,518 | 34.42 |
| 138 | Republican | Marcia Hahn | Re-elected | Republican | Marcia Hahn | 23,287 | 90.02 |
| 138 | Republican | Marcia Hahn | Re-elected | Libertarian | Daniel Richardson | 2,583 | 9.98 |
| 139 | Republican | Mike Peifer | Re-elected | Republican | Mike Peifer | 23,521 | 100.00 |
| 140 | Democratic | John Galloway | Re-elected | Democratic | John Galloway | 21,521 | 100.00 |
| 141 | Democratic | Tina Davis | Re-elected | Democratic | Tina Davis | 17,743 | 65.60 |
| 141 | Democratic | Tina Davis | Re-elected | Republican | Drew Kreiling | 9,305 | 34.40 |
| 142 | Republican | Frank Farry | Re-elected | Republican | Frank Farry | 26,325 | 100.00 |
| 143 | Republican | Marguerite Quinn | Re-elected | Republican | Marguerite Quinn | 24,033 | 63.75 |
| 143 | Republican | Marguerite Quinn | Re-elected | Democratic | Stephen Fager Kunkel | 13,663 | 36.25 |
| 144 | Republican | Kathy Watson | Re-elected | Republican | Kathy Watson | 25,243 | 100.00 |
| 145 | Republican | Craig Staats | Re-elected | Republican | Craig Staats | 18,695 | 58.30 |
| 145 | Republican | Craig Staats | Re-elected | Democratic | Vera J Cole | 13,372 | 41.70 |
| 146 | Republican | Tom Quigley | Re-elected | Republican | Tom Quigley | 15,060 | 51.15 |
| 146 | Republican | Tom Quigley | Re-elected | Democratic | Joe Ciresi | 14,381 | 48.85 |
| 147 | Republican | Marcy Toepel | Re-elected | Republican | Marcy Toepel | 20,045 | 63.35 |
| 147 | Republican | Marcy Toepel | Re-elected | Democratic | Rachel Lynn Hendricks | 11,597 | 36.65 |
| 148 | Democratic | Mary Jo Daley | Re-elected | Democratic | Mary Jo Daley | 24,669 | 63.48 |
| 148 | Democratic | Mary Jo Daley | Re-elected | Republican | Ed Flocco | 14,193 | 36.52 |
| 149 | Democratic | Tim Briggs | Re-elected | Democratic | Tim Briggs | 22,393 | 66.86 |
| 149 | Democratic | Tim Briggs | Re-elected | Republican | Chachira Delphine Smith-Robinson | 11,097 | 33.14 |
| 150 | Republican | Mike Vereb | Retired | Republican | Mike Corr | 17,065 | 54.32 |
| 150 | Republican | Mike Vereb | Retired | Democratic | Linda J. Weaver | 14,352 | 45.68 |
| 151 | Republican | Todd Stephens | Re-elected | Republican | Todd Stephens | 20,358 | 60.81 |
| 151 | Republican | Todd Stephens | Re-elected | Democratic | Jimmy J. Fagan, Jr. | 13,119 | 39.19 |
| 152 | Republican | Tom Murt | Re-elected | Republican | Tom Murt | 21,478 | 63.33 |
| 152 | Republican | Tom Murt | Re-elected | Democratic | Albert J. Dermovsesian, Sr. | 12,439 | 36.67 |
| 153 | Democratic | Madeleine Dean | Re-elected | Democratic | Madeleine Dean | 24,496 | 66.25 |
| 153 | Democratic | Madeleine Dean | Re-elected | Republican | Anthony M. Scalfaro III | 12,478 | 33.75 |
| 154 | Democratic | Steve McCarter | Re-elected | Democratic | Steve McCarter | 27,067 | 77.75 |
| 154 | Democratic | Steve McCarter | Re-elected | Republican | Thomas G. Estilow | 7,747 | 22.25 |
| 155 | Republican | Becky Corbin | Re-elected | Republican | Becky Corbin | 21,617 | 57.95 |
| 155 | Republican | Becky Corbin | Re-elected | Democratic | James Burns | 15,686 | 42.05 |
| 156 | Republican | Dan Truitt | Defeated | Democratic | Carolyn Comitta | 18,267 | 50.03 |
| 156 | Republican | Dan Truitt | Defeated | Republican | Dan Truitt | 18,242 | 49.97 |
| 157 | Republican | Warren Kampf | Re-elected | Republican | Warren Kampf | 19,144 | 55.81 |
| 157 | Republican | Warren Kampf | Re-elected | Democratic | Hans Walter van Mol | 15,156 | 44.19 |
| 158 | Republican | Chris Ross | Retired | Republican | Eric Roe | 17,634 | 53.08 |
| 158 | Republican | Chris Ross | Retired | Democratic | Susan Rzucidlo | 15,590 | 46.92 |
| 159 | Democratic | Thaddeus Kirkland | Retired | Democratic | Brian Joseph Kirkland | 18,161 | 75.60 |
| 159 | Democratic | Thaddeus Kirkland | Retired | Republican | Michael Ciach | 5,860 | 24.40 |
| 160 | Republican | Steve Barrar | Re-elected | Republican | Steve Barrar | 22,178 | 80.97 |
| 160 | Republican | Steve Barrar | Re-elected | Independent | David G. Cleary | 5,211 | 19.03 |
| 161 | Democratic | Leanne Krueger-Braneky | Re-elected | Democratic | Leanne Krueger-Braneky | 18,218 | 50.83 |
| 161 | Democratic | Leanne Krueger-Braneky | Re-elected | Republican | Pattie A. Rodgers Morrisette | 17,621 | 49.17 |
| 162 | Republican | Nick Miccarelli | Re-elected | Republican | Nick Miccarelli | 19,883 | 63.92 |
| 162 | Republican | Nick Miccarelli | Re-elected | Democratic | James Frederick Butt | 11,225 | 36.08 |
| 163 | Republican | James Santora | Re-elected | Republican | James Santora | 18,176 | 54.27 |
| 163 | Republican | James Santora | Re-elected | Democratic | Barbarann Keffer | 15,313 | 45.73 |
| 164 | Democratic | Margo Davidson | Re-elected | Democratic | Margo Davidson | 20,448 | 79.04 |
| 164 | Democratic | Margo Davidson | Re-elected | Republican | Inderjit Singh Bains | 5,423 | 20.96 |
| 165 | Republican | Bill Adolph | Retired | Republican | Alexander Charlton | 20,615 | 56.01 |
| 165 | Republican | Bill Adolph | Retired | Democratic | Elaine Paul Schaeffer | 16,193 | 43.99 |
| 166 | Democratic | Greg Vitali | Re-elected | Democratic | Greg Vitali | 23,783 | 66.03 |
| 166 | Democratic | Greg Vitali | Re-elected | Republican | James J. Knapp III | 12,236 | 33.97 |
| 167 | Republican | Duane Milne | Re-elected | Republican | Duane Milne | 20,623 | 56.72 |
| 167 | Republican | Duane Milne | Re-elected | Democratic | Edward Joseph Denham | 15,734 | 43.28 |
| 168 | Republican | Christopher B. Quinn | Re-elected | Republican | Christopher B. Quinn | 21,058 | 56.15 |
| 168 | Republican | Christopher B. Quinn | Re-elected | Democratic | Diane C. Levy | 16,447 | 43.85 |
| 169 | Republican | Kate Klunk | Re-elected | Republican | Kate Klunk | 23,042 | 80.71 |
| 169 | Republican | Kate Klunk | Re-elected | Independent | Robert J. Marcoccio | 5,506 | 19.29 |
| 170 | Republican | Martina White | Re-elected | Republican | Martina White | 14,256 | 53.92 |
| 170 | Republican | Martina White | Re-elected | Democratic | Matthew J. Darragh | 12,192 | 46.08 |
| 171 | Republican | Kerry Benninghoff | Re-elected | Republican | Kerry Benninghoff | 23,440 | 68.56 |
| 171 | Republican | Kerry Benninghoff | Re-elected | Democratic | Melody S. Fleck | 10,749 | 31.44 |
| 172 | Democratic | Kevin Boyle | Re-elected | Democratic | Kevin Boyle | 16,124 | 62.46 |
| 172 | Democratic | Kevin Boyle | Re-elected | Republican | James Vincent Pio II | 9,691 | 37.54 |
| 173 | Democratic | Michael Driscoll | Re-elected | Democratic | Michael Driscoll | 17,914 | 100.00 |
| 174 | Democratic | Ed Neilson | Re-elected | Democratic | Ed Neilson | 18,879 | 100.00 |
| 175 | Democratic | Mike O'Brien | Re-elected | Democratic | Mike O'Brien | 26,739 | 100.00 |
| 176 | Republican | Jack Rader | Re-elected | Republican | Jack Rader | 17,519 | 100.00 |
| 177 | Republican | John Taylor | Re-elected | Republican | John Taylor | 14,128 | 55.15 |
| 177 | Republican | John Taylor | Re-elected | Democratic | Joseph C. Hohenstein | 11,491 | 44.85 |
| 178 | Republican | Scott Petri | Re-elected | Republican | Scott Petri | 23,567 | 61.07 |
| 178 | Republican | Scott Petri | Re-elected | Democratic | Neale Dougherty | 15,021 | 38.93 |
| 179 | Democratic | Jason Dawkins | Re-elected | Democratic | Jason Dawkins | 20,557 | 100.00 |
| 180 | Democratic | Angel Cruz | Re-elected | Democratic | Angel Cruz | 17,190 | 100.00 |
| 181 | Democratic | Curtis Thomas | Re-elected | Democratic | Curtis Thomas | 27,603 | 100.00 |
| 182 | Democratic | Brian Sims | Re-elected | Democratic | Brian Sims | 31,733 | 100.00 |
| 183 | Republican | Julie Harhart | Retired | Republican | Zachary Mako | 17,481 | 57.92 |
| 183 | Republican | Julie Harhart | Retired | Democratic | Phillips M. Armstrong, Sr. | 12,700 | 42.08 |
| 184 | Democratic | Bill Keller | Re-elected | Democratic | Bill Keller | 21,206 | 100.00 |
| 185 | Democratic | Maria Donatucci | Re-elected | Democratic | Maria Donatucci | 24,085 | 100.00 |
| 186 | Democratic | Jordan Harris | Re-elected | Democratic | Jordan Harris | 29,455 | 100.00 |
| 187 | Republican | Gary Day | Re-elected | Republican | Gary Day | 29,870 | 100.00 |
| 188 | Democratic | Jim Roebuck | Re-elected | Democratic | Jim Roebuck | 26,898 | 100.00 |
| 189 | Republican | Rosemary Brown | Re-elected | Republican | Rosemary Brown | 16,142 | 63.52 |
| 189 | Republican | Rosemary Brown | Re-elected | Democratic | Damary M. Bonilla-Rodriguez | 9,272 | 36.48 |
| 190 | Democratic | Vanessa Brown | Re-elected | Democratic | Vanessa Brown | 28,620 | 100.00 |
| 191 | Democratic | Joanna E. McClinton | Re-elected | Democratic | Joanna E. McClinton | 25,729 | 100.00 |
| 192 | Democratic | Lynwood Savage | Defeated in primary | Democratic | Morgan Cephas | 29,827 | 100.00 |
| 193 | Republican | Will Tallman | Re-elected | Republican | Will Tallman | 21,306 | 74.36 |
| 193 | Republican | Will Tallman | Re-elected | Democratic | Denise Van Essen | 7,345 | 25.64 |
| 194 | Democratic | Pamela DeLissio | Re-elected | Democratic | Pamela DeLissio | 22,960 | 70.72 |
| 194 | Democratic | Pamela DeLissio | Re-elected | Republican | William Pounds | 9,507 | 29.28 |
| 195 | Democratic | Donna Bullock | Re-elected | Democratic | Donna Bullock | 30,269 | 100.00 |
| 196 | Republican | Seth Grove | Re-elected | Republican | Seth Grove | 25,449 | 100.00 |
| 197 | Democratic | Leslie Acosta | Re-elected | Democratic | Leslie Acosta | 23,675 | 100.00 |
| 198 | Democratic | Rosita Youngblood | Re-elected | Democratic | Rosita Youngblood | 28,060 | 100.00 |
| 199 | Republican | Stephen Bloom | Re-elected | Republican | Stephen Bloom | 19,064 | 64.27 |
| 199 | Republican | Stephen Bloom | Re-elected | Democratic | Jill Bartoli | 10,598 | 35.73 |
| 200 | Democratic | Tonyelle Cook-Artis | Defeated in primary | Democratic | Chris Rabb | 34,012 | 94.56 |
| 200 | Democratic | Tonyelle Cook-Artis | Defeated in primary | Republican | Latryse Y. McDowell | 1,958 | 5.44 |
| 201 | Democratic | Stephen Kinsey | Re-elected | Democratic | Stephen Kinsey | 27,706 | 100.00 |
| 202 | Democratic | Mark Cohen | Defeated in primary | Democratic | Jared Solomon | 18,371 | 100.00 |
| 203 | Democratic | Dwight Evans | Elected to Congress | Democratic | Isabella Fitzgerald | 27,420 | 100.00 |

== See also ==
- Pennsylvania House of Representatives election, 2018
