= James Clay =

James Clay may refer to:

- James Clay (author) (1804–1873), English MP and writer about the game of whist
- James Clay (musician) (1935–1994), saxophonist and flautist
- James Clay (Pennsylvania politician), member of the Pennsylvania House of Representatives
- James Brown Clay (1817–1864), United States Representative from Kentucky
- James Franklin Clay (1840–1921), United States Representative from Kentucky
- Jim Clay (production designer), RDI-awarded production designer
- James Clay, a pseudonym used by Phil Foglio (born 1956), cartoonist and comic book artist
