= Pennsylvania House of Representatives, District 157 =

American legislative district

Pennsylvania's 157th State House of Representatives district
Representative
Melissa Shusterman; D–Schuylkill Township, Chester County

The 157th Pennsylvania House of Representatives District is located in Chester County and includes the following areas:

- Chester County
  - Easttown Township
  - Schuylkill Township
  - Tredyffrin Township
  - Willistown Township

== Representatives ==
Representative	Party	Years	District home	Note
Prior to 1969, seats were apportioned by county.
John Stauffer	Republican	1969 – 1970		Elected to the Pennsylvania Senate
Richard T. Schulze	Republican	1971 – 1974	Tredyffrin Township	Elected to the U.S. House of Representatives
Peter R. Vroon	Republican	1975 – 1992		Retired
Carole A. Rubley	Republican	1993 – 2008	Tredyffrin Township	Retired
Paul J. Drucker	Democrat	2009 – 2010	Tredyffrin Township	Unsuccessful candidate for re-election
Warren Kampf	Republican	2011 – 2018	Tredyffrin Township	Unsuccessful candidate for re-election
Melissa Shusterman	Democrat	2019 – present	Schuylkill Township	Incumbent

== Recent election results ==
PA House election, 2008: Pennsylvania House, District 157
Party	Candidate	Votes	%
Democratic	Paul Drucker	18,014	50.95
Republican	Guy Ciarrocchi	17,344	49.05
Total votes		35,358	100.00
Democratic gain from Republican			

PA House election, 2010: Pennsylvania House, District 157
Party	Candidate	Votes	%
Republican	Warren Kampf	13,241	51.86
Democratic	Paul Drucker (incumbent)	12,290	48.14
Total votes		25,531	100.00
Republican gain from Democratic			

PA House election, 2012: Pennsylvania House, District 157
Party	Candidate	Votes	%
Republican	Warren Kampf (incumbent)	14,603	50.60
Democratic	Paul Drucker	14,209	49.24
Write-in		46	0.16
Total votes		28,858	100.00
Republican hold			

PA House election, 2014: Pennsylvania House, District 157
Party	Candidate	Votes	%
Republican	Warren Kampf (incumbent)	9,569	54.48
Democratic	Marian Moskowitz	7,978	45.42
Write-in		17	0.10
Total votes		17,564	100.00
Republican hold			

PA House election, 2016: Pennsylvania House, District 157
Party	Candidate	Votes	%
Republican	Warren Kampf (incumbent)	15,353	54.85
Democratic	Hans van Mol	12,600	45.01
Write-in		38	.14
Total votes		27,991	100.00
Republican hold			

PA House election, 2018: Pennsylvania House, District 157
Party	Candidate	Votes	%
Democratic	Melissa Shusterman	14,524	57.07
Republican	Warren Kampf (incumbent)	10,908	42.86
Write-in		18	.07
Total votes		25,450	100.00
Democratic gain from Republican			

PA House election, 2020: Pennsylvania House, District 157
Party	Candidate	Votes	%
Democratic	Melissa Shusterman (incumbent)	20,315	62.47
Republican	Bryan Walters	15,161	37.53
Total votes		40,399	100.00
Democratic hold			
