= Carole A. Rubley =

American politician (born 1939)

Member of the Pennsylvania House of Representatives from the 157th district
- In office January 5, 1993 – November 30, 2008
- Preceded by: Peter Vroon
- Succeeded by: Paul Drucker

Personal details
- Born: January 18, 1939 (age 87) Bethel, Connecticut
- Party: Democratic (since 2016)
- Other political affiliations: Republican (before 2016)
- Spouse: Ronald
- Children: 3 children

Carole A. Rubley (born January 18, 1939) is a former Republican member of the Pennsylvania House of Representatives. She represented the 157th District from 1993 until her retirement in 2009.

== Biography ==
Rubley was born in Bethel, Connecticut on January 18, 1939. She and her husband have 2 children.

In 1987, she ran for a seat on the seven-member board of supervisors in Tredyffrin Township, Chester County.

Prior to her election to the Pennsylvania House of Representatives, she was vice chair of the Tredyffrin Township board of supervisors while also being employed as a senior project manager by Environmental Resources Management Inc. She was an advocate for streamlined government who, during her 1992 run for the House, said she would focus "on reducing some of the highest costs to taxpayers, including healthcare and education." According to The Philadelphia Inquirer, she also claimed that sabbaticals were being misused by some teachers for "mere travel," or to "split their time between different school years."

Her 1992 campaign received funding from Pennsylvanians for Effective Government and the Women's Campaign Fund, as well as from healthcare interest groups and trial lawyers.

Her previous public service efforts included chairing the Eastern Chester County Regional Planning Committee and the Tredyffrin Recycling Committee. She was also Chester County's solid waste coordinator.

Rubley was unopposed during her reelection campaigns in 1994 and 2000.

She retired prior to the 2008 election and was succeeded by Democrat Paul Drucker.
