= Melissa Shusterman =

American politician (born 1967)

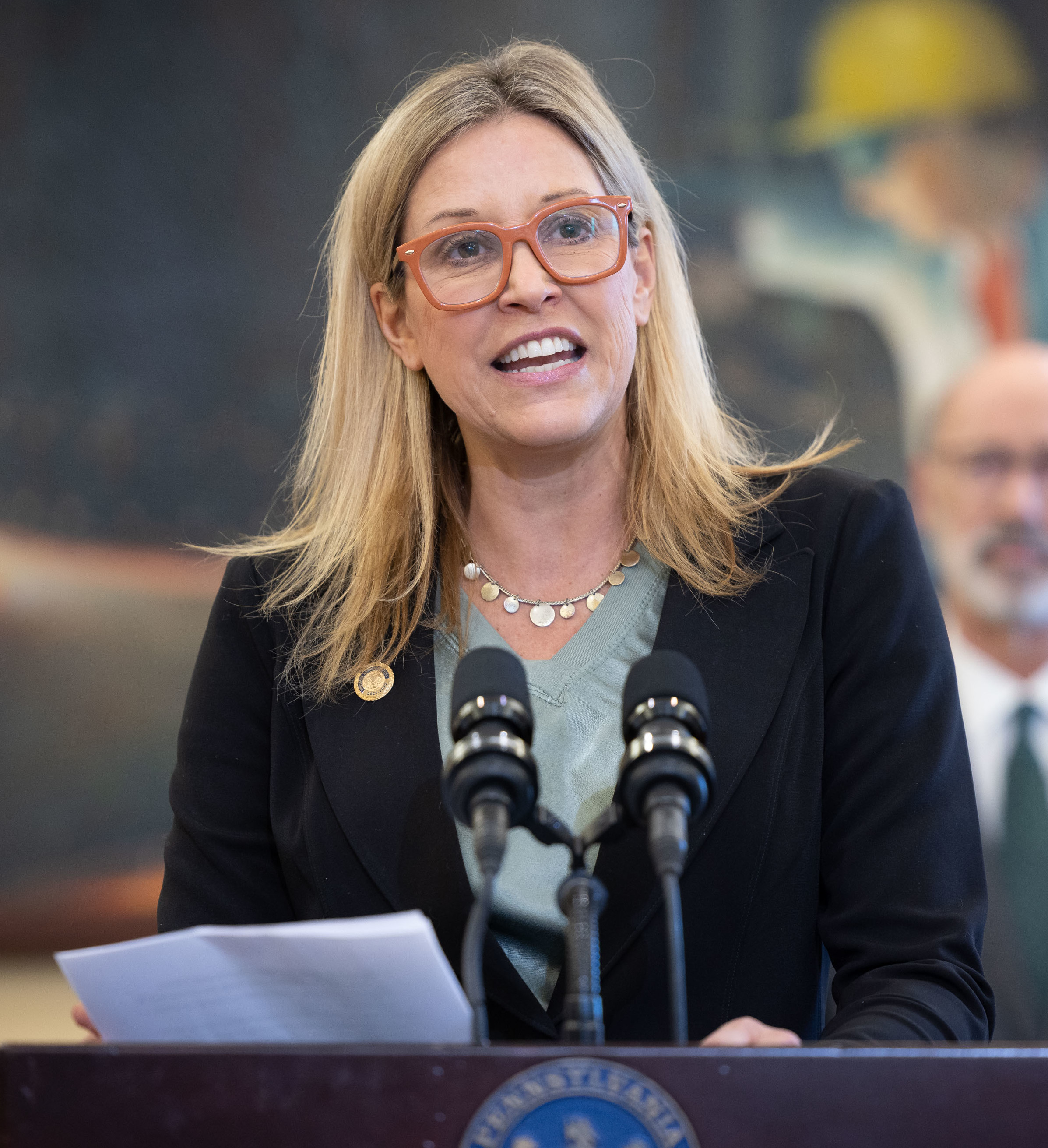
- Shusterman in 2022

Member of the Pennsylvania House of Representatives from the 157th district
- Incumbent
- Assumed office January 1, 2019
- Preceded by: Warren Kampf

Personal details
- Born: September 8, 1967 (age 59) Augusta, Georgia, US
- Party: Democratic
- Children: 1
- Education: Conestoga High School; Lafayette College; American University
- Website: Official website Campaign website

Melissa Shusterman (born September 8, 1967) is a Democratic member of the Pennsylvania House of Representatives for the 157th District, which covers parts of Chester County and Montgomery County. She was elected in 2018.

== Early life and education ==
Shusterman was born in Augusta, Georgia and raised in Tredyffrin Township. She attended Conestoga High School. In 1989, she graduated from Lafayette College with a bachelor's degree in Russian Studies and History. She later obtained a master's degree in Film and Television from American University in Washington, DC.

Shusterman returned to the Chester County area and launched Fedora Media, a video production company, while raising her son as a single mother.

== Career ==
Shusterman was first elected in 2018, successfully unseating four-term incumbent Republican Representative Warren Kampf with 57 percent of the vote. During her campaign, she was endorsed by organizations such as Planned Parenthood, the Pennsylvania Fraternal Order of Police, and the Sierra Club, as well as by former President Barack Obama. Her committee assignments include the Aging and Older Adult Services, Children & Youth, Commerce, and Rules. Shusterman also serves as Democratic secretary of the Judiciary committee. Shusterman is the first freshman representative to serve as a deputy whip for her party.

== Personal life ==
Shusterman resides in Schuylkill Township, Pennsylvania with her husband Hans and son Paris.

== Electoral history ==
2018 Pennsylvania House of Representatives election, 157th district
Party	Candidate	Votes	%
Democratic	Melissa Shusterman	17,681	56.58%
Republican	Warren Kampf (incumbent)	13,567	43.42%
Democratic gain from Republican			

2020 Pennsylvania House of Representatives election, 157th district
Party	Candidate	Votes	%
Democratic	Melissa Shusterman (incumbent)	24,854	62.53%
Republican	Bryan Walters	14,894	37.47%
Democratic hold			
