= Paul Drucker =

American politician (born 1945)

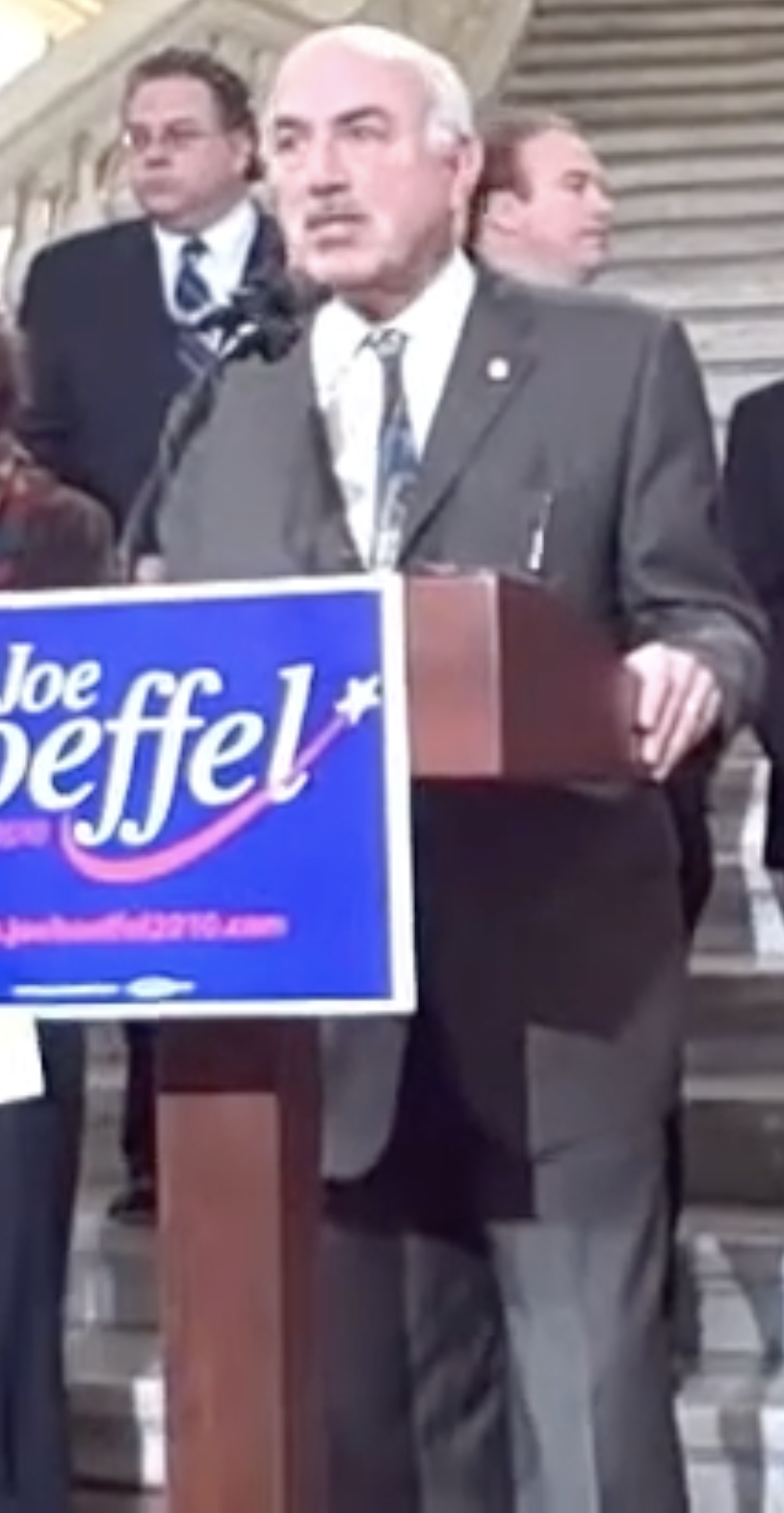

Member of the Pennsylvania House of Representatives from the 157th district
- In office January 6, 2009 – November 30, 2010
- Preceded by: Carole A. Rubley
- Succeeded by: Warren Kampf

Member of the Tredyffrin Township Board of Supervisors from the 3rd District
- In office January 4, 2005 – December 31, 2006

Personal details
- Born: April 17, 1945 (age 81)
- Party: Democratic
- Occupation: Attorney

Paul J. Drucker (born April 17, 1945) is an American politician and former member of the Pennsylvania House of Representatives. He represented the 157th district from 2009 through 2010 as a Democrat.

== Professional career ==
Drucker is a practicing attorney. He has held a variety of positions, including working in the district attorney's office under future Senator Arlen Specter. Drucker has worked as a lecturer, and as a judge pro tem for the Philadelphia Common Pleas Court. He is also certified mediator in U.S. District Court, a Hearing Committee member of the Disciplinary Board of the state Supreme Court and a member of the board of directors of the First Bank of Philadelphia.

== Political career ==
=== Township Supervisor ===
In December 2005, Drucker won a special election to fill a two-year term on the Tredyffrin Township Board of Supervisors. He was the first Democrat to win political office in the township's 300-year history. Drucker lost his bid for re-election in 2007.

=== State House career ===
==== 2008 election campaign ====
On November 4, 2008, he was elected to the State House, succeeding retiring Republican Carole A. Rubley. He defeated his opponent, Guy Ciarrocchi, by a margin of 50.9% to 49.1%.

The race was considered one of the nastiest and most expensive in the state. Both candidates launched websites attacking one another. Ciarrocchi, then-Chief of Staff to Congressman Jim Gerlach, attacked Drucker's legal career through a website called "slip and fall Paul". Drucker's campaign attacked Ciarrocchi's political background through a website called "what kind of Guy". In the end, Drucker narrowly defeated his opponent in a count that stretched into the morning following election day.

==== 2010 re-election campaign ====
Drucker was defeated in his bid for re-election by Republican Warren Kampf.

==== Committee service ====
Drucker served on the Aging and Older Adult Services Committee, as well as the Children and Youth, Health and Human Services and Judiciary Committees while in the House.

==== 2012 election campaign ====
Drucker ran against incumbent Warren Kampf in an attempt to regain his seat in the 2012 election. Kampf narrowly won re-election by a margin of 51% to 49%.

Pennsylvania House of Representatives
Preceded by Carole Rubley	Member of the Pennsylvania House of Representatives for the 157th District; 2009–2010	Succeeded by Warren Kampf
Political offices
Preceded by John Petersen	Member of the Tredyffrin Township Board of Supervisors for the 3rd District; 2005–2008	Succeeded by J.D. DiBuonaventuro
