= Richard Mirabito =

American politician

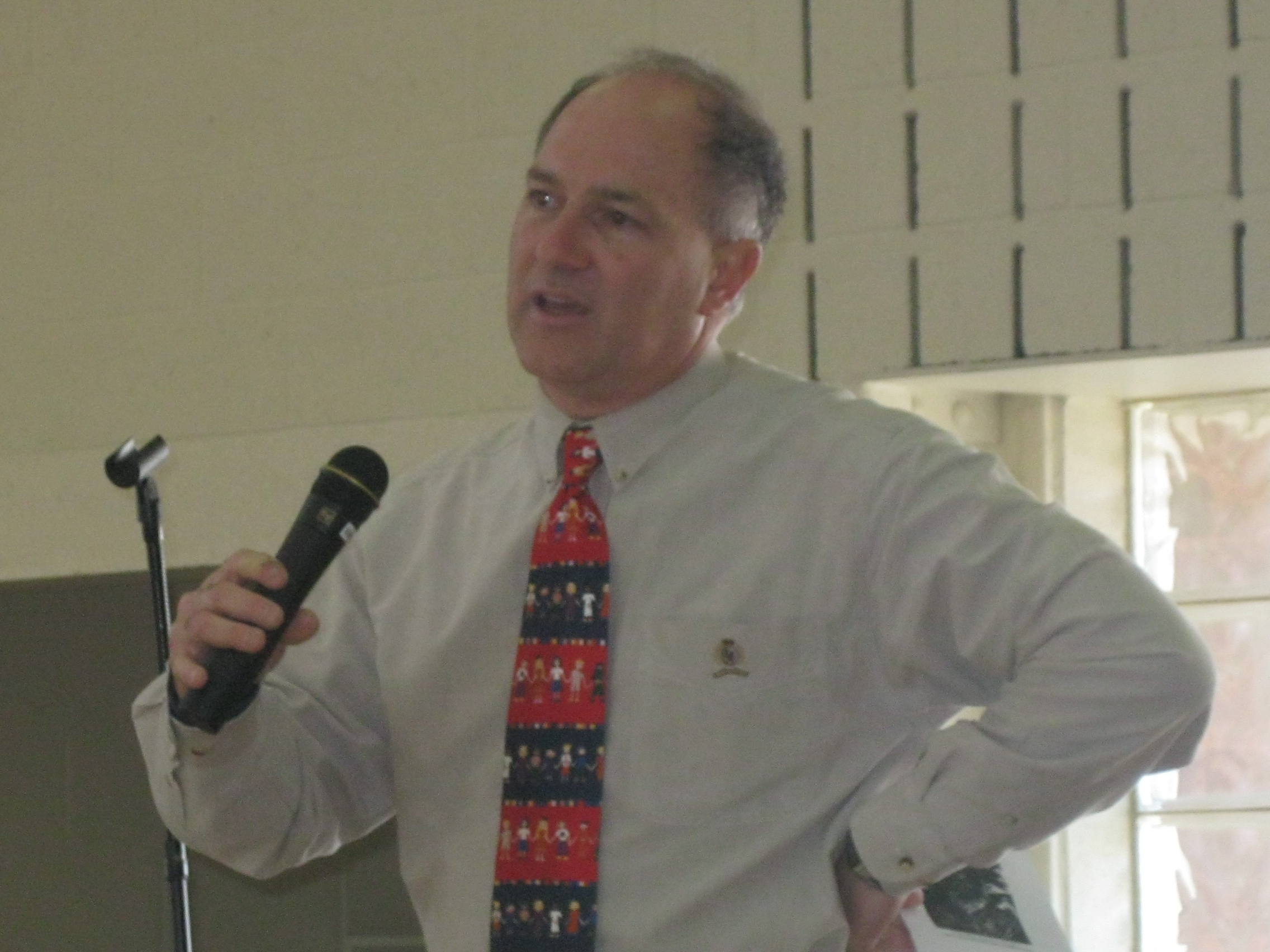

Member of the Pennsylvania House of Representatives from the 83rd district
- In office January 6, 2009 – January 6, 2015
- Preceded by: Steven W. Cappelli
- Succeeded by: Jeff Wheeland

Personal details
- Born: 1956 (age 69–70) Sea Cliff, New York, U.S.
- Party: Democratic
- Spouse: Sara
- Children: 1
- Education: Cornell University, Boston College Law School

Richard Mirabito is an American politician and businessman from Williamsport, PA. He served as a County Commissioner in Lycoming County. He served three terms as a member of the Pennsylvania House of Representatives for the 83rd district.

== Background ==
Mirabito was born in Sea Cliff, New York and graduated from North Shore High School in 1974. In 1987, Mirabito was on the court counsel for the Republic of Palau Supreme Court. In 1989, Mirabito earned his Juris Doctor (J.D.) from Boston College Law School and moved to Williamsport to become a law clerk for United States District Judge Malcolm Muir.

== Real Estate ==
In March 1990, Mirabito started a real estate leasing company, Mirabito Properties, which currently leases real estate in 35 locations around Williamsport.

He is a member of the College and Community Coalition organized by the Pennsylvania College of Technology and chairman of the Organization Committee of the Main Street project and was on the board of Our Towns 2010.

== Political career ==
Mirabito represented the 83rd District in the Pennsylvania House of Representatives for the 2009, 2011 and 2013 terms. Following an unsuccessful reelection bid for the 2015 term, Mirabito was elected to the Lycoming County Commission.

== Personal life ==
Mirabito is married. The couple lives in Cogan Station PA with their son and are members of St. Boniface Church.

On January 2, 2024, Mirabito was charged with misdemeanor theft and felony burglary and trespassing for allegedly illegally evicting a tenant. The charges were withdrawn the same day, but refiled later. On January 23, 2024, a district judge dismissed the charges.
