= James Clay (Pennsylvania politician) =

American politician

Member of the Pennsylvania House of Representatives from the 179th district
- In office 2013–2014
- Preceded by: Tony Payton
- Succeeded by: Jason Dawkins

Personal details
- Party: Democratic

James W. Clay, Jr. is a former Democratic member of the Pennsylvania House of Representatives, who represented the 179th legislative district from 2013 to 2014. He was elected in 2012 after his predecessor, Tony Payton, was removed from the ballot due to a failure to collect the proper number of signature, leaving him as the only candidate remaining. He ran in, but lost, the 2014 election and he withdrew from the 2016 election.

Clay is a graduate of Frankford High School.
