= Tony Payton =

American politician

Tony Payton Jr.

Member of the Pennsylvania House of Representatives from the 179th district
- In office January 2, 2007 – December 31, 2012
- Preceded by: William W. Rieger
- Succeeded by: James Clay

Personal details
- Born: 1981 (age 44–45)
- Party: Democratic
- Occupation: PA State Representative

Tony J. Payton Jr. (born 1981) is a former Democratic member of the Pennsylvania House of Representatives, representing the 179th legislative district encompassing the historic communities of Frankford, Oxford Circle, Hunting Park, Olney and Feltonville. He was elected in 2006. and sworn into his first term on January 2, 2007. He is now a registered lobbyist with Malady & Wooten, LLP.

== Biography ==
Before Rep. Payton was elected to the Pennsylvania House of Representatives, he worked as a housing counselor at United Communities in South Philadelphia where he educated low-income families on personal finance to help them achieve homeownership. It was through this work that Rep. Payton realized his desire for public service and consequently, pursued and won a seat in the Pennsylvania General Assembly, making him the youngest elected official in the Commonwealth at the time.

In 2007, Rep. Payton was elected president of the Pennsylvania Young Democrats, a statewide organization with 47 chapters throughout the Commonwealth. As president of PYD, Rep. Payton has led a campaign to engage young professionals throughout Pennsylvania to join in the democratic process.

During his tenure in the General Assembly in 2006, Rep. Payton was at the forefront of education reform in Pennsylvania. He introduced legislation to create the Pennsylvania Youth Commission and authored the REACH Scholarship Initiative. He served on the Human Services Subcommittee on Mental Health as the Democratic Chair, the Professional Licensure Committee, the State Government Committee as the Democratic Secretary and also was the Democratic Chair of the Transportation Subcommittee on Railroads.

Rep. Payton was a 2005-06 fellow with the Center for Progressive Leadership. He was actively involved with Philadelphia’s Young Non-profit Leaders. He is also a big brother with Big Brothers Big Sisters of Southeastern Pennsylvania and currently a mentor for students nearby at Frankford High School. In 2007, he was awarded the leadership award as one of the most influential African Americans by the Philadelphia Tribune.

Rep. Payton is currently attending classes at Temple University and is president of the Pennsylvania Young Democrats. Prior to elective office, Payton worked as a housing counselor for the United Communities in South Philadelphia. In 2007, the Philadelphia Tribune named him one of the most influential African Americans.
