= Warren Kampf =

American politician (born 1967)

Member of the Pennsylvania House of Representatives from the 157th district
- In office January 4, 2011 – November 30, 2018
- Preceded by: Paul Drucker
- Succeeded by: Melissa Shusterman

Member of the Tredyffrin Township Board of Supervisors from the at-large district
- In office January 5, 2004 – January 4, 2011
- Preceded by: John Bravacos
- Succeeded by: Mike Heaberg

Personal details
- Born: May 19, 1967 (age 59)
- Party: Republican
- Children: 2
- Education: Yale University (BA); Emory University (JD)
- Occupation: Attorney, politician

Warren Kampf (born May 19, 1967) is an American politician and attorney. He is a member of the Republican Party who served in the Pennsylvania House of Representatives in the 157th District from 2011 to 2018.

== State representative ==
In 2010, he was elected to represent the 157th District in the Pennsylvania House of Representatives, defeating incumbent Democrat Paul Drucker. Kampf then faced a rematch with Drucker in the 2012 election, and Kampf maintained his seat.

Kampf lost his seat to Democrat Melissa Shusterman in 2018.

Pennsylvania House of Representatives
Preceded by Paul Drucker	Member of the Pennsylvania House of Representatives from the 157th District; 2011–2018	Succeeded by Melissa Shusterman
