= David R. Millard =

American politician (born 1953)

Member of the Pennsylvania House of Representatives from the 109th district
- In office February 9, 2004 – December 1, 2022
- Preceded by: John Gordner
- Succeeded by: Robert Leadbeter

Personal details
- Born: February 10, 1953 (age 73) Bloomsburg, Pennsylvania, U.S.
- Party: Republican
- Spouse: Rita
- Children: 5 stepchildren
- Education: Bloomsburg University (BS)

David R. Millard (born February 10, 1953) is an American Republican politician who served as a member of the Pennsylvania House of Representatives for the 109th legislative district. He was elected in a special election on January 27, 2004, to fill the unexpired term of John Gordner, who was elected to the Pennsylvania State Senate.

== Early life and education ==
A native of Bloomsburg, Pennsylvania, Millard graduated from Bloomsburg High School in 1971. Millard's mother suffered a series of strokes before he was born. When he was 15, she died. Afterward, Millard's father worked multiple jobs to support David and his five elder siblings. After taking classes at night, Millard earned a Bachelor of Science degree in office administration from Bloomsburg University in 1988.

== Career ==
Prior to elective office, Millard worked for Bechtel from 1974 to 1984. He then worked for the PPL Corporation until his election in 2004. As an employee of PPL, he joined and served in the leadership of the local chapter of the International Brotherhood of Electrical Workers. He also served as director of the Bloomsburg Fair and vice-president of the Bloomsburg Volunteer Fire Department.

In December 2021, Millard announced he would not seek re-election in 2022 and would also be retiring from his director position on the Bloomsburg Fair Board.

Millard was a member of the Judiciary Committee and served as chair of the Tourism & Recreational Development Committee.

== Personal life ==
Millard's second wife, Emily, died in 1996 after a three-month bout with cancer. He married his third wife, Rita, in 1999. The Millards own and operate a real estate rental business and a fabric store in Bloomsburg, Pennsylvania.
