= Mark Mustio =

American politician

T. Mark Mustio

Member of the Pennsylvania House of Representatives from the 44th district
- In office June 17, 2003 – January 1, 2019
- Preceded by: John R. Pippy
- Succeeded by: Valerie Gaydos

Personal details
- Born: September 3, 1957 (age 69) York, Pennsylvania
- Party: Republican
- Education: Grove City College
- Website: www.repmustio.com

T. Mark Mustio (born September 3, 1957) is a Republican former member of the Pennsylvania House of Representatives for the 44th District and was elected in special election in June 2003.

== Career ==
Prior to running for the House, Mustio was a partner in an insurance brokerage firm.

In 2000, Mustio was elected to the Moon Township Board of Supervisors, serving as chairman of that body. On June 17, 2003, Mustio was elected to represent the 44th legislative district in a special election to fill the remainder of John Pippy's term. Mustio won a full term in 2004 and was re-elected in 2006.

For the 2009-10 legislative session, Mustio serves on the House Labor Relations, Liquor Control, Professional Licensure and Urban Affairs Committees. He is also a member of the Legislative Budget and Finance Committee, Pittsburgh Port Commission and the Joint State Government Commission Tasks Forces and Advisory Committee.

In 2012, Mustio ran for the Pennsylvania State Senate seat representing the 37th District to succeed retiring Republican incumbent John Pippy. He was defeated in a three-way Republican primary by D. Raja on April 24, 2012.
