= Michael H. O'Brien =

American politician (1954–2018)

Mike O'Brien

Member of the Pennsylvania House of Representatives from the 175th district
- In office January 2, 2007 – October 15, 2018
- Preceded by: Marie Lederer
- Succeeded by: Mary Isaacson

Personal details
- Born: July 24, 1954 Philadelphia, Pennsylvania, U.S.
- Died: October 15, 2018 (aged 64) Philadelphia, Pennsylvania, U.S.
- Resting place: Holy Cross Cemetery, Yeadon, Pennsylvania; 39.93358°N 75.25750°W
- Party: Democratic
- Spouse: Rita M. O'Brien
- Children: 2

Michael O'Brien (July 24, 1954 – October 15, 2018) was an American politician who was a member of Democratic Party in Pennsylvania House of Representatives, representing the 175th legislative district. He was first elected in 2006.

The district he served contained such Philadelphia landmarks as Independence Hall, the Liberty Bell, South Street, and Penn Treaty Park. O'Brien attended Northeast Catholic High School for Boys and La Salle University.

Prior to elective office, he served as chief of staff to Marie Lederer.

O'Brien suffered a fatal heart attack on October 15, 2018.
