= Karen Boback =

American politician and educator

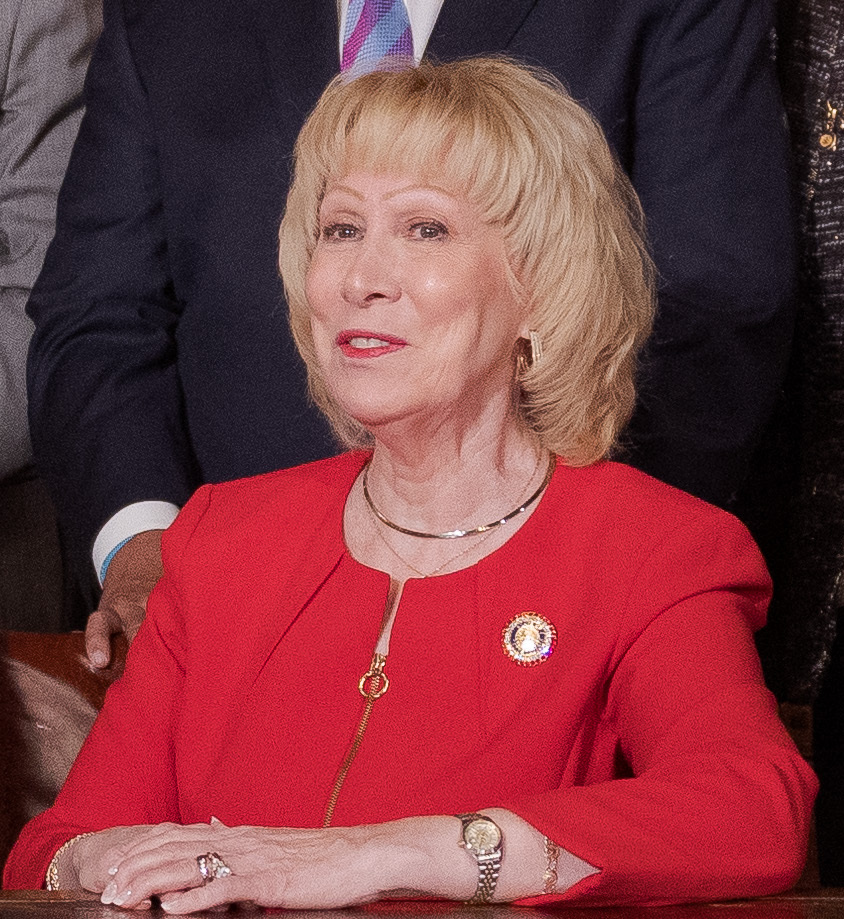
- Boback in November 2022

Member of the Pennsylvania House of Representatives from the 117th district
- In office January 2, 2007 – November 30, 2022
- Preceded by: George C. Hasay
- Succeeded by: Mike Cabell

Personal details
- Born: Scranton, Pennsylvania, U.S.
- Party: Republican
- Spouse(s): Bernard J. Boback, Jr.
- Children: 2
- Education: College Misericordia (BA, MA); Marywood University (MEd); University of Pennsylvania (PhD)
- Website: Official

Karen Boback is an American politician and educator who served as a Republican member of the Pennsylvania House of Representatives for the 117th legislative district from 2007 to 2022.

== Early life and education ==
Boback was born in Scranton, Pennsylvania. She earned a bachelor's degree in elementary and special education and a master's degree in education from College Misericordia, a master's degree from elementary school guidance counseling Marywood University, and a Ph.D. in organizational leadership from the University of Pennsylvania.

== Career ==
Prior to her career in politics, Boback worked as a teacher, guidance counselor and college professor. She was presented with the Excellence in Education Award by College Misericordia in November 2006 and was named Harveys Lake Citizen of the Year in 2006.

In 2018, Boback announced "the leadership program she developed for high school students is up-and-running in the Dallas, Tunkhannock and Lake-Lehman School Districts."

Boback currently serves on the Tourism & Recreational Development and Veterans Affairs & Emergency Preparedness committees.

In 2022, Boback announced her intent to retire at the end of her current term. She was succeeded by Republican Michael Cabell.

== Electoral history ==
Results 2006–2014
Year	Republican	Votes	Pct	Democrat	Votes	Pct
2006	Karen Boback	12,724	57%	Angelo Sabbatini	6,193	33%
2008	Karen Boback	19,115	71%	Russ Bigus	7,810	29%
2010	Karen Boback	15,945	82%	Richard Shermanski	3,587	18%
2012	Karen Boback	24,003	100%	No candidate		
2014	Karen Boback	12,429	73%	Laura Dickson	4,603	27%
