= Upper Darby Township, Pennsylvania =

Township in Pennsylvania, US

Upper Darby, Pennsylvania
- Home rule township
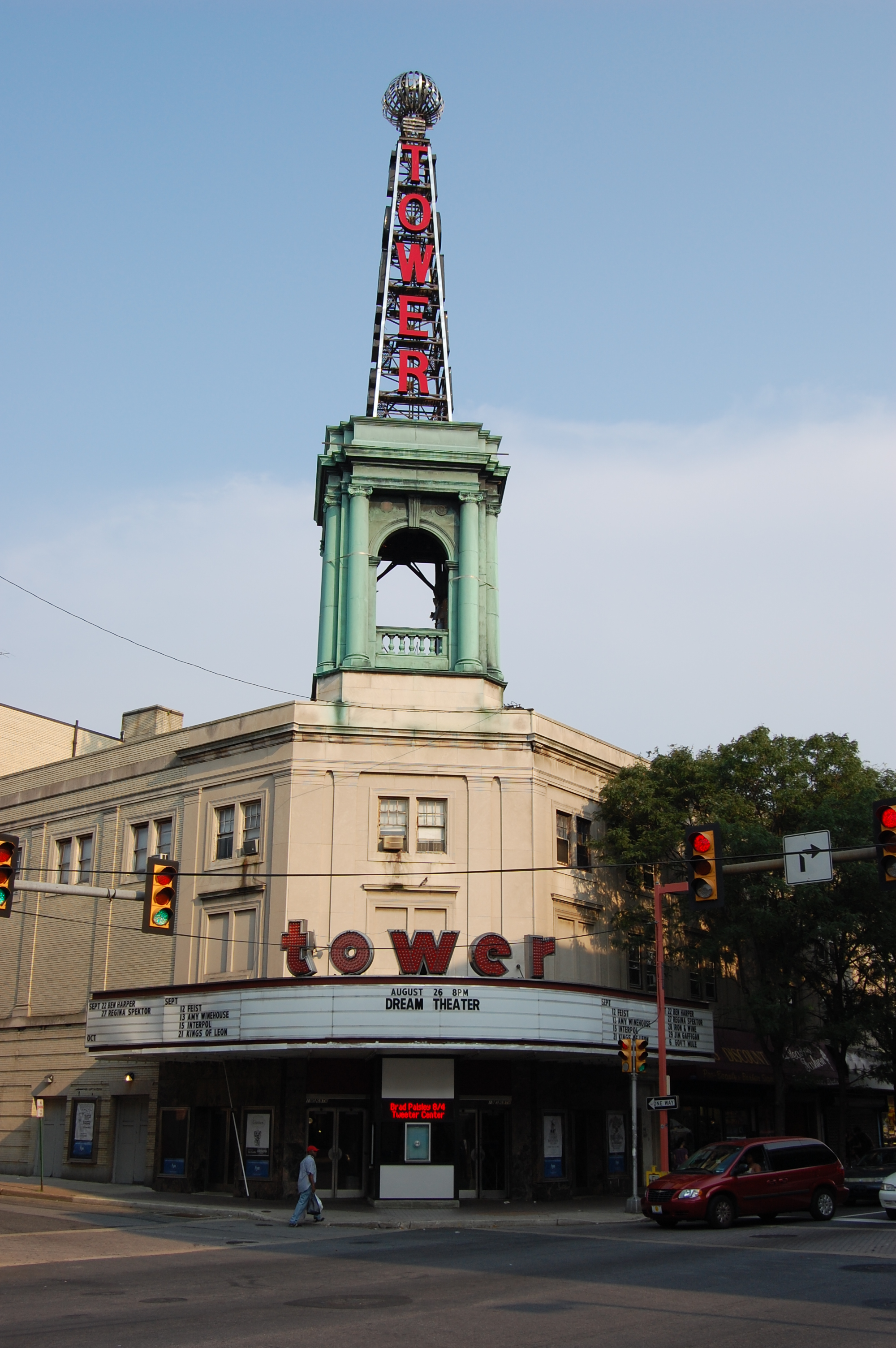
- Tower Theater in Upper Darby Township

- Seal Logo
- Nickname: UD
- Motto: "The World in One Place"
- Interactive map of Upper Darby
- Location within Pennsylvania Location within the United States
- Coordinates: 39°57′30″N 75°18′29″W
- Country: United States
- State: Pennsylvania
- County: Delaware
- Settled: 1653
- Incorporation: 1786

Government
  - Type: Mayor–council
  - Mayor: Ed Brown (D)

Area
  - Total: 7.83 sq mi (20.27 km^{2})
  - Land: 7.83 sq mi (20.27 km^{2})
  - Water: 0 sq mi (0.00 km^{2})
- Elevation: 230 ft (70 m)

Population (2020)
  - Total: 85,681
  - Density: 10,559.1/sq mi (4,076.89/km^{2})
- Time zone: UTC-5 (EST)
  - Summer (DST): UTC-4 (EDT)
- ZIP Code: 19082
- Area codes: 610 and 484
- FIPS code: 42-045-79000
- Website: www.upperdarby.org

Upper Darby Township, often shortened to Upper Darby, is a home rule township in Delaware County, Pennsylvania, United States. As of the 2020 census, the township had a total population of 85,681, making it the state's sixth-most populated municipality after Philadelphia, Pittsburgh, Allentown, Reading, and Erie. Upper Darby borders Philadelphia, the nation's sixth-most populous city, and constitutes part of the Philadelphia metropolitan area, the nation's seventh-largest metropolitan area.

Upper Darby is home to the Tower Theater, a historic music venue on 69th Street built in the 1920s, and to several Underground Railroad sites. In August 2019, the radio tower on top of the theater was removed due to structural concerns.

== History ==
=== Settlement and 17th century ===
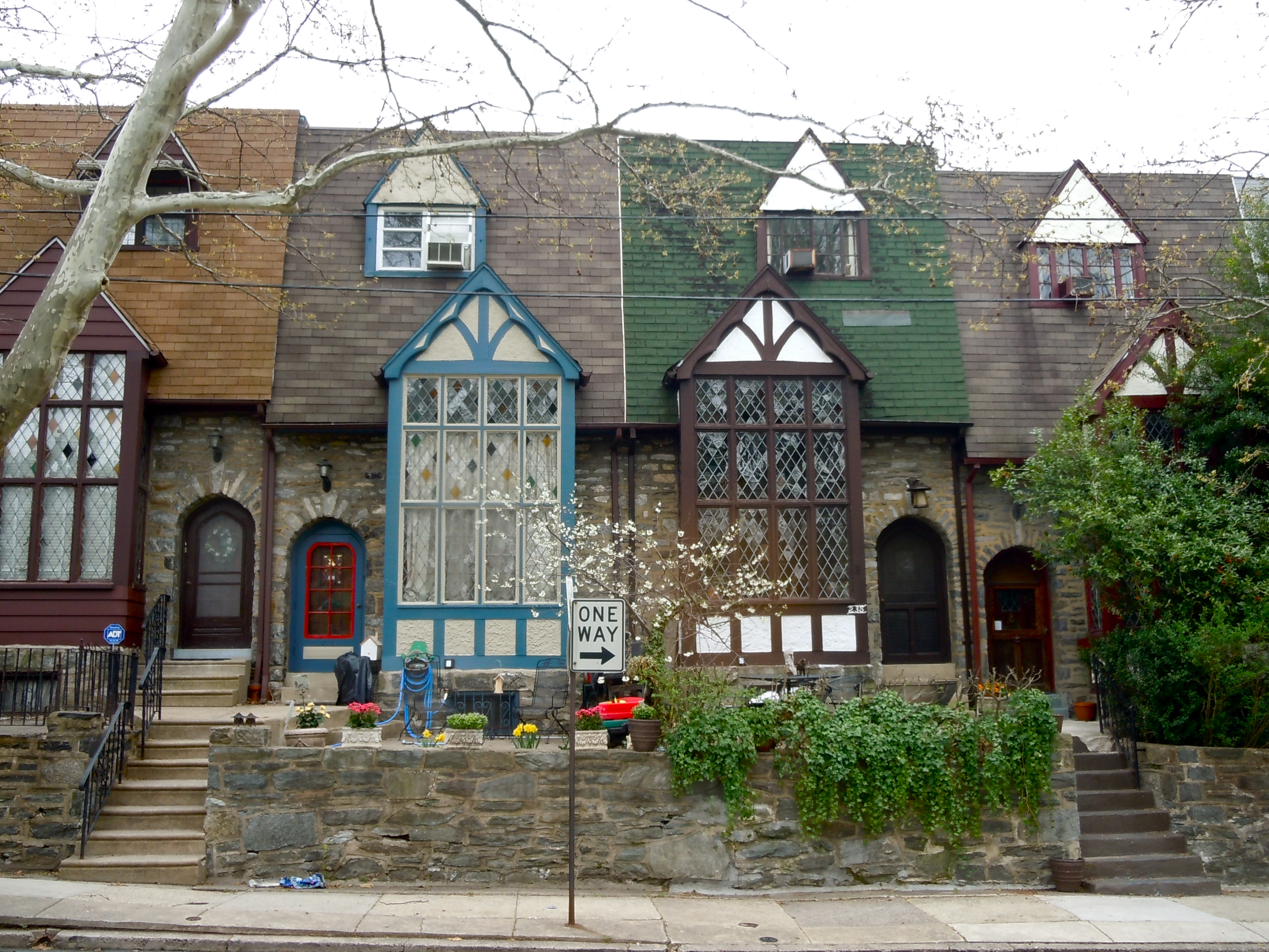
Row houses on Richfield Road

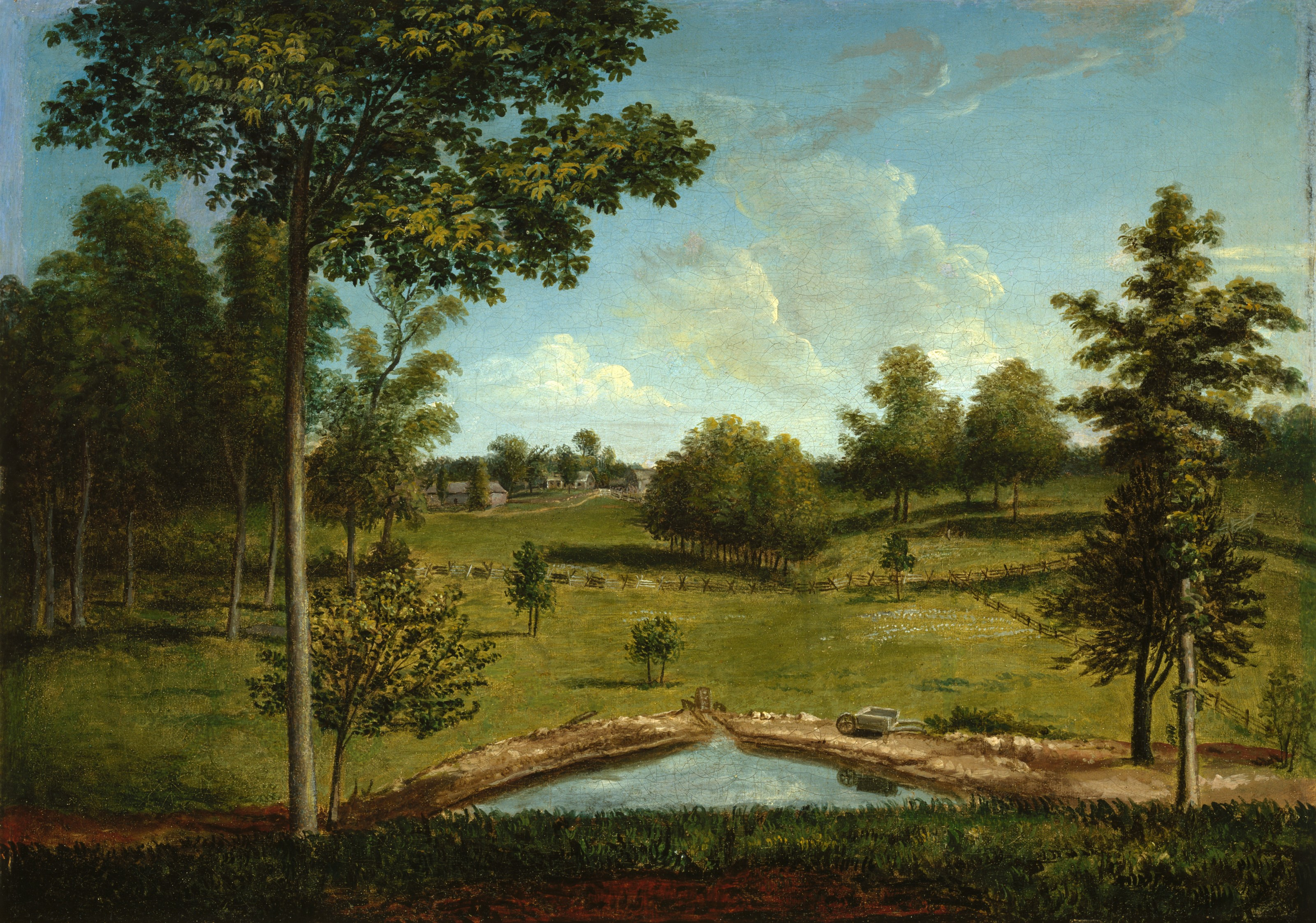
Charles Willson Peale's portrait Landscape Looking Toward Sellers Hall from Mill Bank in Upper Darby

In 1650, the area that eventually became Upper Darby had been inhabited by the Lenape tribe of Native Americans for thousands of years. The Lenape were part of the larger late Woodland culture, living in longhouses and birch bark homes, and engaging in the type of agriculture featuring companion planting of the Three Sisters (winter squash, maize, and beans).

The first permanent Europeans settlers arrived in late 1653 with a group from New Sweden. Soon after, in 1655, New Sweden was taken over by the Dutch, and then came under English rule in October 1664 as part of England's overall conquest of New Amsterdam. The region was controlled as a possession of the English king until it was included in a large land grant to William Penn in 1681.

Upon Penn's founding of the colony of Pennsylvania the next year, the area was designated as part of the municipality of Darby Township, in Chester County. It was subsequently part of the eastern section of that county which was split off on September 26, 1789, to form Delaware County.

The Lower Swedish Cabin, thought to have been built in 1654, is located on Creek Road along the Darby Creek and is believed by many to be a remnant of the early Swedes, who introduced the log cabin to this area. Today the "Swedish Cabin" is designated with a Pennsylvania Historical Marker. The Cabin is also on the National Register of Historic Places.

=== 18th century ===
Darby Township originally occupied the area between the current border of Upper Darby to the north, Cobbs Creek and then Darby Creek to the east and south, and Ridley and Springfield townships to the west. This continued until 1747, when, for the convenience of the inhabitants, it was decided at a town meeting to separate the upper part from the lower "in all matters save the levies made for the support of the poor," with the northern part thereafter to be called Upper Darby Township. The exact boundary was not established until 1786, when a petition was presented to the court. The following is an excerpt from this petition:

Beginning at Cobb's Creek on the Northwest side of a tract of land belonging to the heirs of Joshua Ash and in the line of said land, thence along said line and the line of land late Enoch Bonsall's & Joshua Bonsall's to Darby Creek thence down the said Creek to the northwest line of John Ash's land, thence along said line and the line of Samuel Ash and Nathaniel Smith to the line of Ridley Township, and that the lower part may be called Darby and the other part Upper Darby.

The abundance of creeks and streams in the area favored the development of mills, and it was in Upper Darby that some of the first mills in Delaware County could be found. Some notable examples were the Cardington Mills in the Cardington section of the township and the Kent Mills in the Kellyville section. The site of the former Kent Mills is now a recreation area and dog park known as Kent Park. One local mill owner was the Garrett family, who owned mills along the Darby Creek.

=== 19th century ===
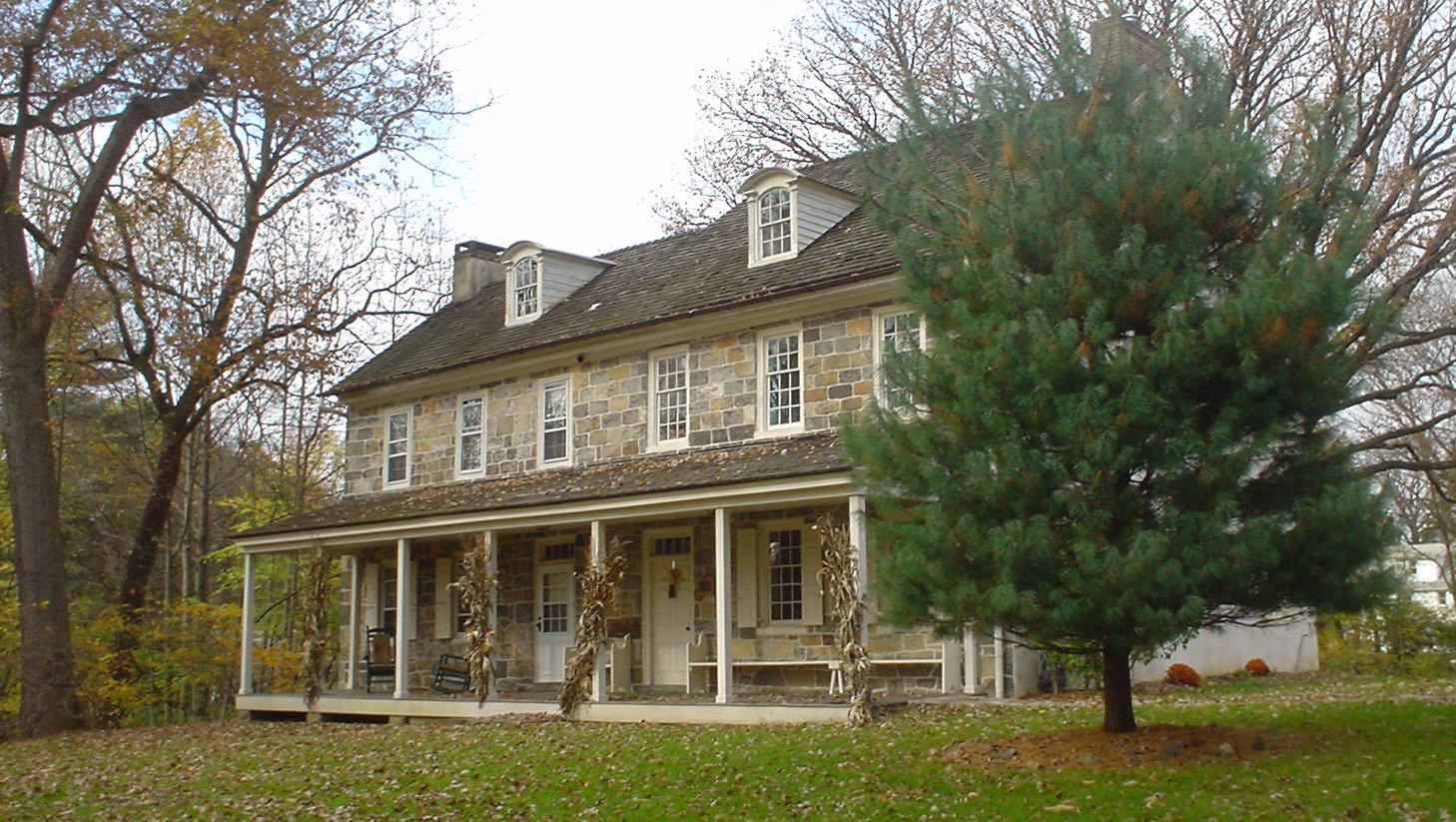
Collen Brook Farm

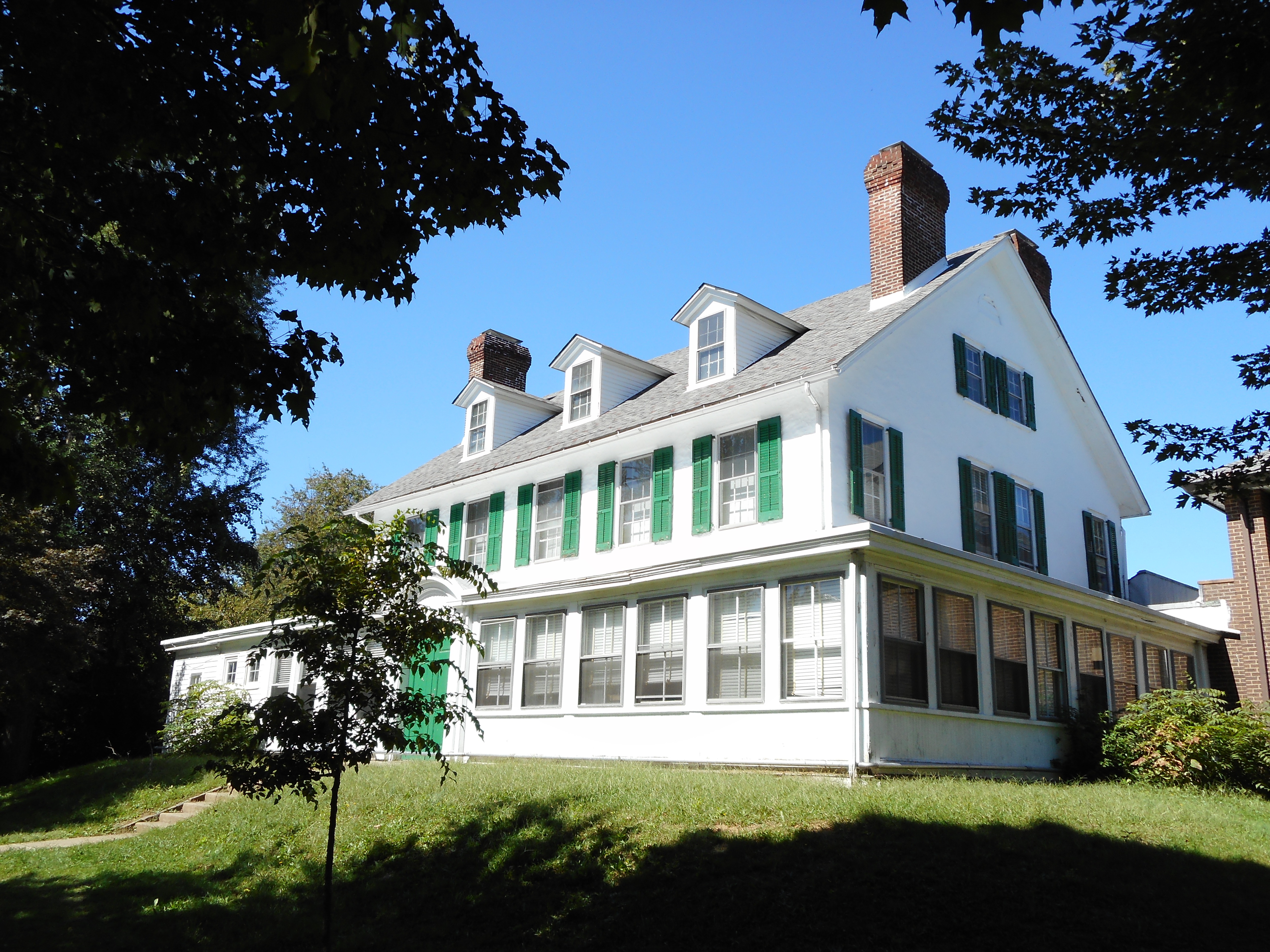
The Abe Pennock House was a stop on the Underground Railroad

In addition to mills, the township was part of a region that was home to rock quarries, factories, and other various industrial concerns. Industrialization greatly increased the township's population from just over 800 in 1800 to almost 5,000 by 1890 and spurred residential and commercial development that attracted an influx of European immigrants. To serve this influx, churches were founded across the township.

The township's population explosion turned out to be a double-edged sword as beginning in 1885, the township lost large sections of territory as the citizens of more populated neighborhoods petitioned the state to be recognized as separate municipalities. The first of these was the borough of Clifton Heights (incorporated on June 1, 1885), followed by the boroughs of Lansdowne (July 6, 1893), Aldan (September 22, 1893), Millbourne (October 12, 1909), and East Lansdowne (June 3, 1911). Part of the territory of Aldan was also taken from Darby Township.

Reflecting the Quaker background of its earliest English settlers, Upper Darby was active in the antislavery movement. At least one abolition society existed prior to 1830, and sent a committee of twelve prominent citizens to the 1830 meeting of the Pennsylvania Anti-Slavery Society in Philadelphia.

Many homes in the area were stops on the Underground Railroad, including Hoodland, the home of abolitionist Abraham L. Pennock and Thomas Pennock, which was eventually bequeathed to the township's public library and which currently houses the children's library, connected to a much larger modern annex which houses the Main Branch. Another prominent abolitionist, Thomas Garrett, grew up in Upper Darby and Thornfield, his home until the age of 32, still stands at Garrett Road and Maple Avenue in the Drexel Hill neighborhood.

The influx of immigrants drawn to the township by industrialization caused the township's population to explode, and also gave Upper Darby a role in the Civil War. Two regiments from Upper Darby took part in the American Civil War, including the 106th Pennsylvania Infantry Regiment, which was involved in the Battle of Antietam and Battle of Gettysburg.

In addition to mills, the township was part of a region that was home to rock quarries, factories, and other various industrial concerns. Industrialization greatly increased the township's population from just over 800 in 1800 to almost 5,000 by 1890 and spurred residential and commercial development that attracted an influx of European immigrants. To serve this influx, churches were founded across the township.

=== 20th century ===
In 1907, the Philadelphia Rapid Transit Company recognized the potential for growth in the township and extended the Market-Frankford elevated train line, or the "El", from just west of the Schuylkill River in Philadelphia to 69th and Market Streets in Upper Darby. The El terminus at 69th Street Station became a busy terminal serving several trolley and light rail lines into the suburbs, as well as numerous city and suburban bus routes. Commuter traffic spurred the development of the 69th St. shopping district in the 1920s by John McClatchy, and made Upper Darby the second-busiest shopping area in the region after Center City Philadelphia. The business district is noted for many fine examples of Art Deco style buildings. A population explosion in the township followed; by the 1960s, Upper Darby was the seventh-most populous municipality in Pennsylvania.

In the early 1970s, students from Highland Park Elementary School began a campaign to have the Pennsylvania Firefly declared the official state insect of Pennsylvania. With advice and support from state legislators, the students began a campaign that included letter writing, the circulation of petitions, and the distribution of bumper stickers. On April 10, 1974, Governor Milton J. Shapp signed their bill making the Pennsylvania Firefly their state's official insect. A couple of years later, Highland Park Elementary School was presented with a bronze plaque in honor of the students' achievement.

=== 21st century ===
In the wake of the 2020 racial uprising in response to the murder of George Floyd, several protests and actions took place in Upper Darby, including a die-in at 69th and Market Streets.

In 2020, the community voted on a motto for Upper Darby, "The World in One Place," reflecting the multicultural community of the present day.

Upper Darby has seen a rise in LGBTQ activism of late, and Upper Darby Pride, a non-profit organization planned the first Upper Darby Pride Fest for June 2020. It was cancelled due to the COVID-19 pandemic. However, it was held a year later by U.D.T.J. on the grounds of Upper Darby High School and accompanied by other Pride events in the township.

In 2023, the Pride celebration in Upper Darby grew into what is now Delaware County Pride. Delaware County Pride hosted its inaugural festival in Downtown Upper Darby June 10, 2023.

== Geography ==
According to the U.S. Census Bureau, the township has a total area of 7.9 square miles (20.4 km^{2}), all land. The township lies on the edge of the Piedmont slightly above the City of Philadelphia (60 to 260 ft or 18 to 79 m above sea level). The area is crossed by several small creeks. The borough of East Lansdowne, Pennsylvania is an enclave completely surrounded by Upper Darby Township; additionally, an exclave of Upper Darby Township is separated from the rest of the township.

Upper Darby neighborhoods include Aronimink, Beverly Hills, Bywood, Drexel Hill, Drexel Park, Fernwood, Highland Park, Llanerch Hills, Kellyville, Kirklyn, Oakview, Primos, Secane, Stonehurst, Terminal Square, and Westbrook Park.

Cobbs Creek runs along the border of Upper Darby and connects with Darby Creek. Cobbs Creek Park and the Philadelphia public golf course abut the Highland Park Neighborhood of Upper Darby along the border of Philadelphia's Overbrook Park neighborhood.

=== Neighborhoods ===
- Addingham
- Aronimink
- Beverly Hills
- Bywood
- Cardington
- Drexel Hill, also a census designated place
- Fernwood
- Highland Park
- Kirklyn
- Penn Pines
- Primos
- Secane
- Terminal Square
- Stonehurst Hills
- Walnut Park
- Westbrook Park

=== Adjacent municipalities and communities ===
- Cobbs Creek, Philadelphia – east
- Millbourne Borough, Delaware County – northeast
- Overbrook Park, Philadelphia – north
- East Lansdowne Borough, Delaware County – surrounded
- Yeadon Borough, Delaware County – southeast
- Lansdowne Borough, Delaware County – south
- Darby Borough, Delaware County – south
- Clifton Heights, Delaware County – south
- Aldan Borough, Delaware County – south
- Darby Township, Delaware County – south
- Ridley Township, Delaware County – southwest
- Springfield Township, Delaware County – west
- Haverford Township, Delaware County – west

=== Climate ===
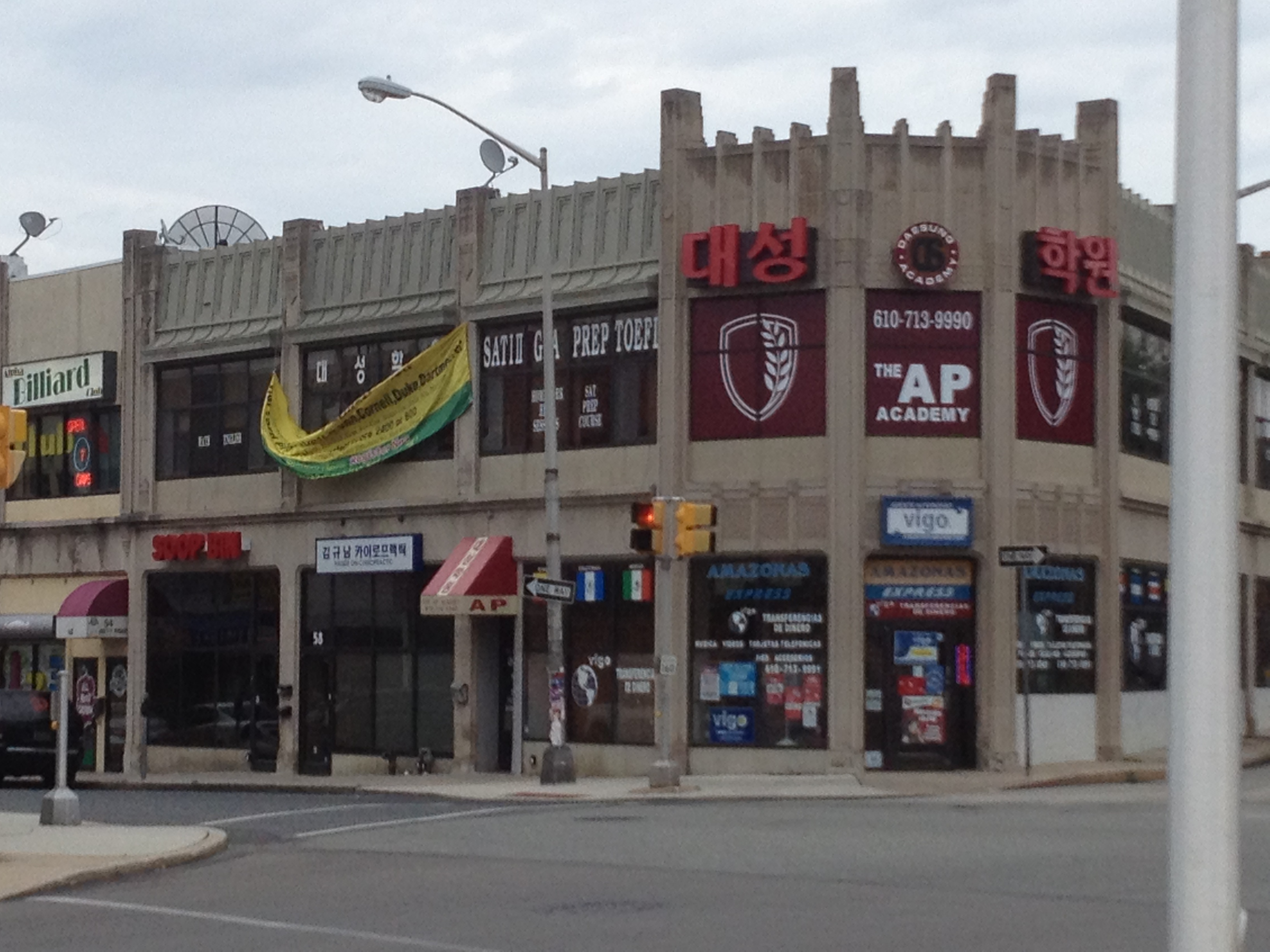
Upper Darby Township, Cheltenham Township, and West Philadelphia, are areas in the Philadelphia region with significant Korean populations

Upper Darby has a humid subtropical climate (Cfa) and the hardiness zone is 7a bordering 7b. Average monthly temperatures in the vicinity of Garrett Road and Lansdowne Avenue range from 32.9 °F in January to 77.7 °F in July.

Climate data for Upper Darby
Month	Jan	Feb	Mar	Apr	May	Jun	Jul	Aug	Sep	Oct	Nov	Dec	Year
Mean daily maximum °F (°C)	40.5 (4.7)	43.9 (6.6)	52.9 (11.6)	64.0 (17.8)	73.4 (23.0)	82.0 (27.8)	86.5 (30.3)	84.6 (29.2)	78.1 (25.6)	66.6 (19.2)	55.6 (13.1)	45.3 (7.4)	64.5 (18.0)
Daily mean °F (°C)	33.8 (1.0)	36.3 (2.4)	44.2 (6.8)	54.7 (12.6)	64.4 (18.0)	73.2 (22.9)	78.1 (25.6)	76.3 (24.6)	69.4 (20.8)	57.9 (14.4)	47.3 (8.5)	38.7 (3.7)	56.2 (13.4)
Mean daily minimum °F (°C)	27.1 (−2.7)	28.6 (−1.9)	36.0 (2.2)	45.9 (7.7)	55.6 (13.1)	64.8 (18.2)	70.0 (21.1)	68.7 (20.4)	61.3 (16.3)	50.0 (10.0)	39.2 (4.0)	31.8 (−0.1)	48.3 (9.0)
Average precipitation inches (mm)	2.24 (57)	2.11 (54)	2.58 (66)	2.35 (60)	2.29 (58)	2.79 (71)	3.02 (77)	3.06 (78)	2.60 (66)	2.29 (58)	1.90 (48)	2.78 (71)	30.01 (764)
Source: Weather.Directory

== Demographics ==
Historical population
Census	Pop.	Note	%±
1900	3,821		—
1910	5,385		40.9%
1920	8,956		66.3%
1930	47,145		426.4%
1940	56,883		20.7%
1950	84,951		49.3%
1960	93,158		9.7%
1970	95,910		3.0%
1980	84,054		−12.4%
1990	81,777		−2.7%
2000	81,821		0.1%
2010	82,795		1.2%
2020	85,681		3.5%
U.S. Decennial Census

Upper Darby is one of Pennsylvania's most diverse communities.

=== 2020 census ===
Upper Darby Township, Pennsylvania – Racial and ethnic composition Note: the US Census treats Hispanic/Latino as an ethnic category. This table excludes Latinos from the racial categories and assigns them to a separate category. Hispanics/Latinos may be of any race.
Race / Ethnicity (NH = Non-Hispanic)	Pop 2000	Pop 2010	Pop 2020	% 2000	% 2010	% 2020
White alone (NH)	62,525	45,341	33,961	76.42%	54.76%	39.64%
Black or African American alone (NH)	9,124	22,341	30,291	11.15%	26.98%	35.35%
Native American or Alaska Native alone (NH)	75	119	125	0.09%	0.14%	0.15%
Asian alone (NH)	7,227	9,182	10,878	8.83%	11.09%	12.70%
Pacific Islander alone (NH)	20	29	24	0.02%	0.04%	0.03%
Other race alone (NH)	103	178	556	0.13%	0.21%	0.65%
Mixed race or Multiracial (NH)	1,404	1,850	3,108	1.72%	2.23%	3.63%
Hispanic or Latino (any race)	1,343	3,755	6,738	1.64%	4.54%	7.86%
Total	81,821	82,795	85,681	100.00%	100.00%	100.00%

In 2019, three out members of the LGBTQ community were elected to the Upper Darby School Board.

As of the census of 2000, there were 85,038 people, 32,551 households, and 20,474 families residing in the township. The population density was 14,658.7 people per square mile. There were 34,322 housing units at an average density of 4,361.6 per square mile (1,684.0/km^{2}). The racial makeup of Upper Darby was 59.1% White; 20.5% African American; 15.3% Asian; 0.1% Native American; <0.1% Pacific Islander; 0.5% from other races and 2.3% from two or more races. Hispanics or Latinos of any race were 2.4% of the population

There were 32,551 households, out of which 31.0% had children under the age of 18 living with them, 45.0% were married couples living together, 13.4% had a female householder with no husband present, and 37.1% were non-families. 31.6% of all households were made up of individuals, and 11.5% had someone living alone who was 65 years of age or older. The average household size was 2.50 and the average family size was 3.23.

25.2% of the population was under the age of 18, 8.4% from 18 to 24, 32.8% from 25 to 44, 19.9% from 45 to 64 and 13.7% who were 65 years of age or older. The median age was 35 years. For every 100 females, there were 91.6 males. For every 100 females age 18 and over, there were 88.2 males. The median income for a household in the township was $41,489, and median income for a family was $52,500. Males had a median income of $38,090 versus $30,416 for females. The per capita income for the township was $20,770. About 7.3% of families and 9.1% of the population were below the poverty line, including 11.1% of those under age 18 and 6.9% of those age 65 or over.

=== Religion ===
The Roman Catholic Archdiocese of Philadelphia operates several Catholic churches in Upper Darby:

- St. Andrew Church (Drexel Hill)
- St. Bernadette Church (Drexel Hill)
- St. Charles Borromeo Church (Drexel Hill)
- St. Dorothy Church (Drexel Hill)
- St. Laurence Church (Highland Park)

Soji Zen Center is a Buddhist Temple in the Drexel Hill section of Upper Darby.

Masjid Al-Madinah Islamic Center is a mosque and cultural center located on 69th Street. Masjid Omar and AL-Quran Center are in the Stonehurst and Bywood neighborhoods.

Sree Sree Sanatan Shangho and Sree Narayana Guru Deva Temple are Hindu Temples located in Bywood.

St Demetrios Greek Orthodox Church is located in the Stonehurst neighborhood.

Protestant denominations in Upper Darby include Presbyterian, Baptist, United Methodist, Lutheran, and non-denominational.

=== Crime ===
In 1991, five Upper Darby policemen were convicted in federal court and sentenced to prison for violating the civil rights of two residents, a father and son. Each was found guilty on several counts involving assault, false arrest, and prosecution.

On January 30, 2002, Upper Darby police officer Dennis McNamara was shot and killed in the line of duty by Thomas Campbell. McNamara was investigating a suspicious parked vehicle around 9:30 PM when Campbell came up behind him and shot him in the side of the head with a .32 caliber revolver. McNamara had a section of Lansdowne Avenue renamed in his honor; Campbell pled guilty to his murder in 2003 and was sentenced to life in prison plus ten years. He died in Graterford Prison in 2015.

== Arts and culture ==
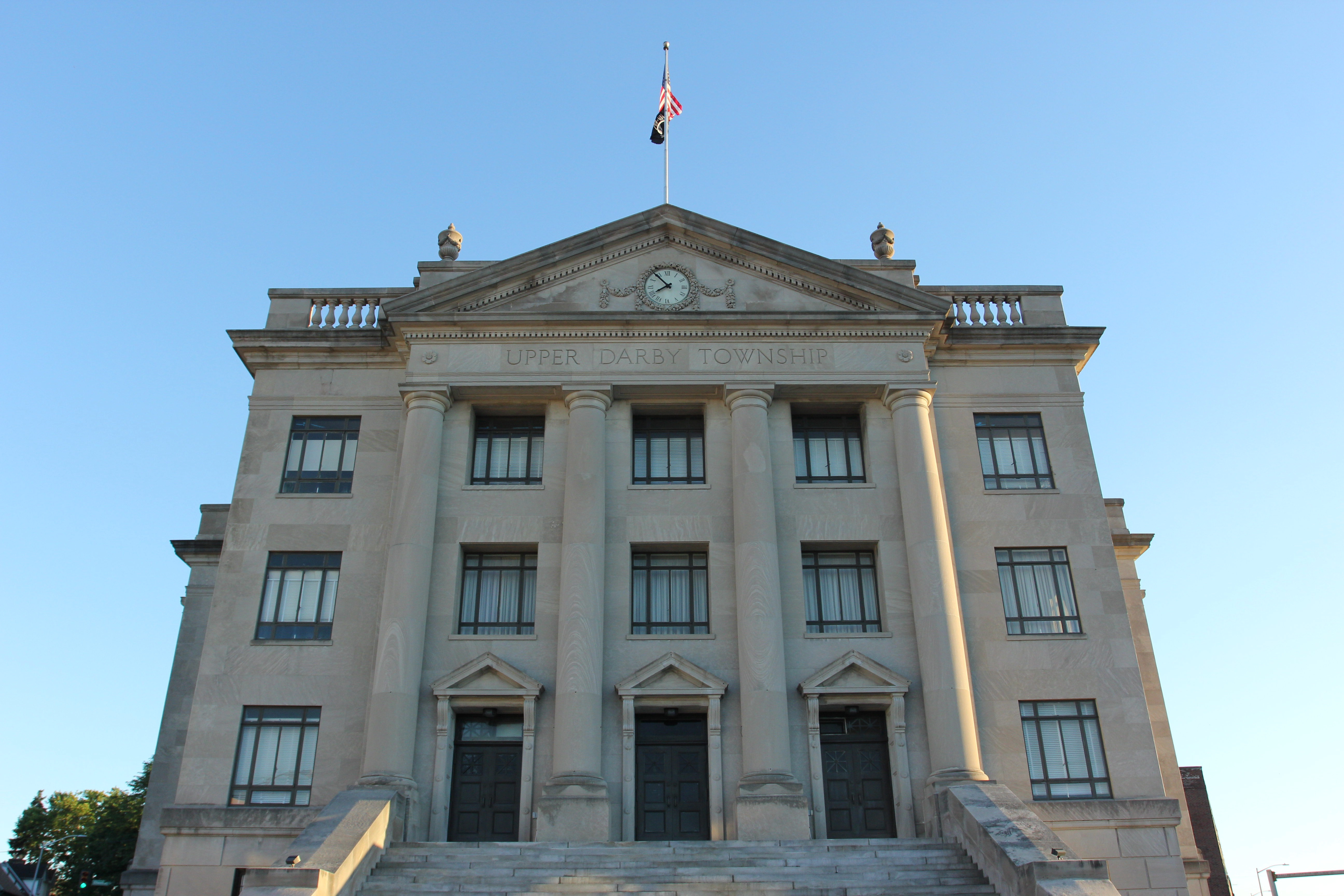
The Upper Darby Township Building

Tower Theater, located in Terminal Square at the intersection of 69th and Ludlow Streets, opened as a movie and vaudeville theater in 1927. After closing briefly, the Tower reopened as a concert venue in 1972, and has hosted acts including the first American tours of David Bowie and Genesis. In addition to musical acts, the Tower has hosted comedians such as Trevor Noah and Jim Norton. In 2018, Rolling Stone listed the Tower as one of the ten best live music venues in the United States.

Upper Darby Summer Stage is one of the nation's oldest youth theater programs.

The annual Music Man Festival is held at Greenhorn Gardens in Arlington Cemetery and features live music, food, beer gardens, and a 5k fundraiser for arts programs.

The Upper Darby International Festival is an annual event held in September in Terminal Square (prior to 2021 it was held on 69th Street). The festival features performances, artwork, and food reflecting the diverse cultural backgrounds of the Upper Darby community.

Opened in 2018, the Upper Darby Art Gallery in the Highland Park neighborhood features local, national and international artists and works, as well as art classes.

Centered in Terminal Square and the West Chester Pike business districts, Upper Darby restaurants feature a diverse range of cuisines including Vietnamese, Thai, Japanese, Liberian, Indian, Italian, Korean, Mexican, and Colombian. The community is also known for its Irish pubs, and the Llanerch Diner was the setting for a pivotal scene in the film Silver Linings Playbook.

The Philadelphia Museum of Art opened the first branch museum in the United States, modeled on the Carnegie Library branch system, on 69th Street. The 69th Street Branch of the PMA operated from 1930 to 1933.

The University of Pennsylvania operated the Flower and Clark Observatory in the Highland Park neighborhood from 1897 to 1956, the site is now known as Observatory Park.

=== Historic sites ===
- Arlington Cemetery is on the former site of Riverview Farm, a stop on the Underground Railroad. A small museum is located in the Mt. Vernon building at the cemetery.
- Collen Brook Farm was listed on the National Register of Historic Places in 1988. It was the home of political leader George Smith.
- Lower Swedish Cabin was listed on the National Register of Historic Places in 1980. It is believed to be the oldest building in Pennsylvania, and one of the oldest log cabins in the United States.
- Sellers Hall is one of the oldest buildings in Pennsylvania, and was the ancestral home to one of Upper Darby's earliest settling families, the Sellers. The oldest part of the building was built in 1684 by Samuel Sellers. Sellers Hall served as a station on the Underground Railroad in the 1800s.
- Thornfield – Abolitionist Thomas Garrett's home, built around 1800.
- Upper Darby's downtown Terminal Square area contains several Art Deco buildings centered around the McClatchy Building on the corner of 69th and Market.

=== Libraries ===
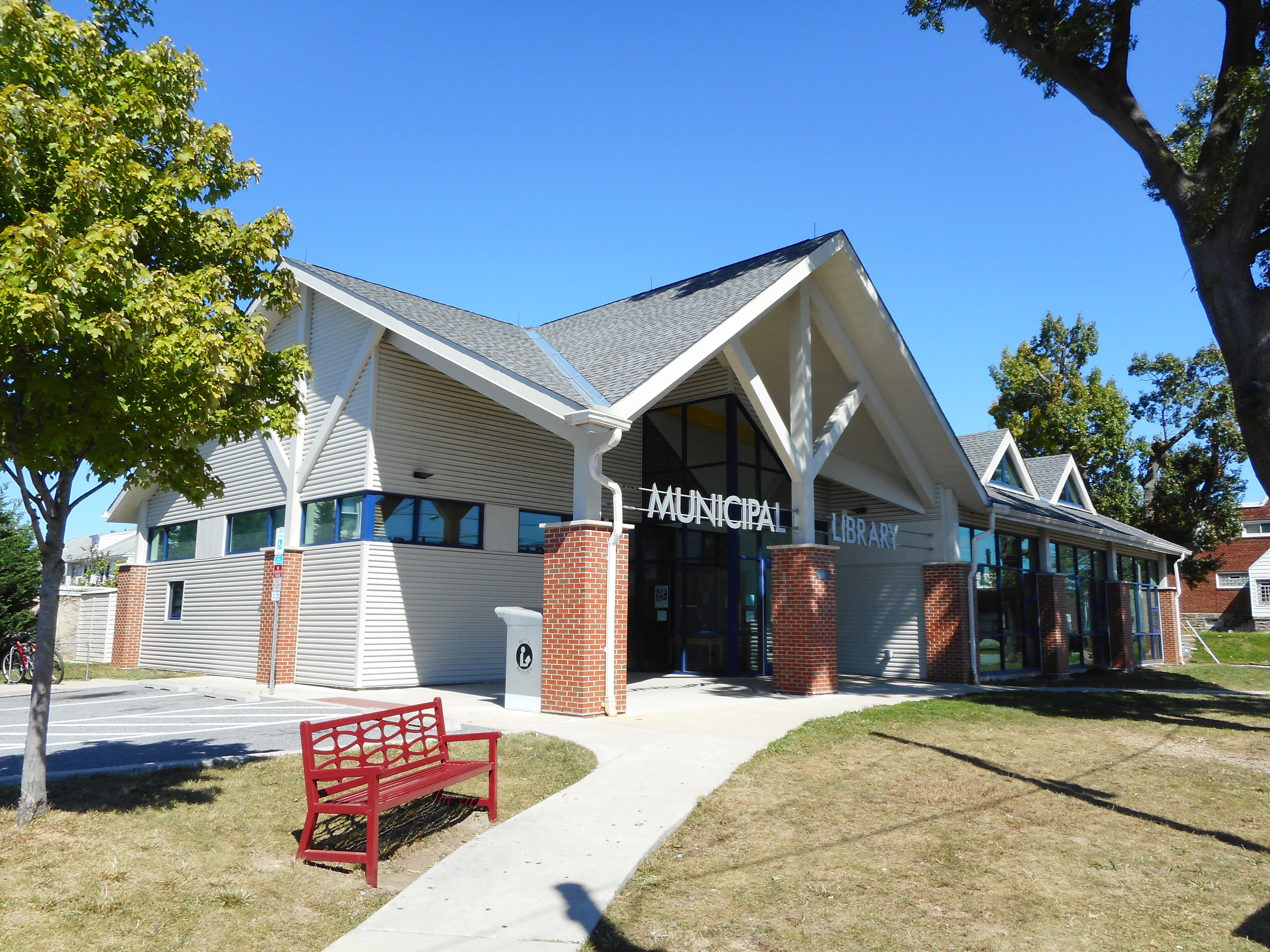
Upper Darby Public Library's Municipal Branch, one of three public libraries in the township

Upper Darby Township has three public library branches as part of the Delaware County Library System:

- Sellers Memorial Free Library
- Free Library Municipal Branch
- Free Library Primos Branch

=== Cemeteries ===
- Friends Southwestern Burial Ground, a Quaker cemetery founded in 1860.
- Fernwood Cemetery, a privately owned burial ground founded in 1870.
- Arlington Cemetery, a non-denominational burial ground founded in 1895.
- Har Jehuda Cemetery, a Jewish burial ground founded in 1896.
- Montrose Cemetery, privately owned founded 1896

== Government and politics ==
In the 2020 presidential election, Democrat Joe Biden received 71.1% of the vote in Upper Darby with Republican Donald Trump receiving 28.9%. In the 2016 presidential election, Democrat Hillary Clinton received 25,475 votes (66.3%), Republican Donald Trump received 11,967 (31.1%) votes, with independent candidates receiving just over 1,000 votes in Upper Darby.

In the 2016 U.S. Senate race, Democrat Katie McGinty received 23,294 votes over Republican Pat Toomey, who received 13,539 votes in Upper Darby. Upper Darby is in Pennsylvania's 5th Congressional district, currently represented by Democrat Mary Gay Scanlon.

In the Pennsylvania legislature, Upper Darby is represented by Democrat Gina Curry in the 164th District and Democrat Heather Boyd is in the 163rd House District. Upper Darby is in the 26th Pennsylvania Senate District, represented by Democrat Tim Kearney.

In local politics, Democrats hold an 11-0 majority of the town council seats as well as the mayor's office; all nine seats on the school board are held by Democrats.

On January 2, 2024, Democrat Ed Brown was sworn in as Upper Darby's first black mayor.

== Education ==
=== Public schools ===
Upper Darby Township's public education is provided by the Upper Darby School District. In all, the 12 public schools plus the Kindergarten Center serve nearly 12,000 students. The district has one high school, Upper Darby High School, three middle schools, Beverly Hills Middle School, Clifton Heights Middle School and Drexel Hill Middle School, and 10 public elementary schools. In addition to Upper Darby, Secane, Clifton Heights, and Millbourne students attend the Upper Darby School District. Established in 1895, Upper Darby High School is one of the largest brick and mortar high schools in Pennsylvania with almost 4,000 students. In August 2026, Clifton Heights Middle School finished construction.

=== Private schools ===
In addition to the public school district, Upper Darby is home to several parochial and private schools. Monsignor Bonner & Archbishop Prendergast Catholic High School for boys and girls, is Roman Catholic, and has an enrollment of fewer then 1,000 students. The schools offers grades 9–12, and will soon offer access to classes at the adjacent Delaware County Community College. In addition to the high school, there are nine parochial primary and middle schools located in the Township, with a combined enrollment of 2,867.

Catholic K-8 schools include:

- Saint Andrew School (Drexel Hill)
- St. Bernadette of Lourdes School (Drexel Hill)
- St. Dorothy School (Drexel Hill)
- St. Eugene School (Primos)
- St. Laurence School (Highland Park)

Almost all of the private academic schools in the Township are administered by the Archdiocese of Philadelphia except for the Holy Child Academy, which is a Catholic academy run by the Society of the Holy Child Jesus. Former schools included St. Alice School, closed in 2006, and St. Charles Borromeo School, closed in 2007.

=== Tertiary and adult education ===
Also available to residents of Upper Darby and surrounding areas is the Upper Darby Adult Evening Program (UDAEP). UDAEP offers professional development and general education classes to township residents. UDAEP is an independent non-profit entity separate from the Upper Darby School District.

Delaware County Community College's Upper Darby Center holds day and evening classes serving 600 students.

== Infrastructure ==
=== Transportation ===
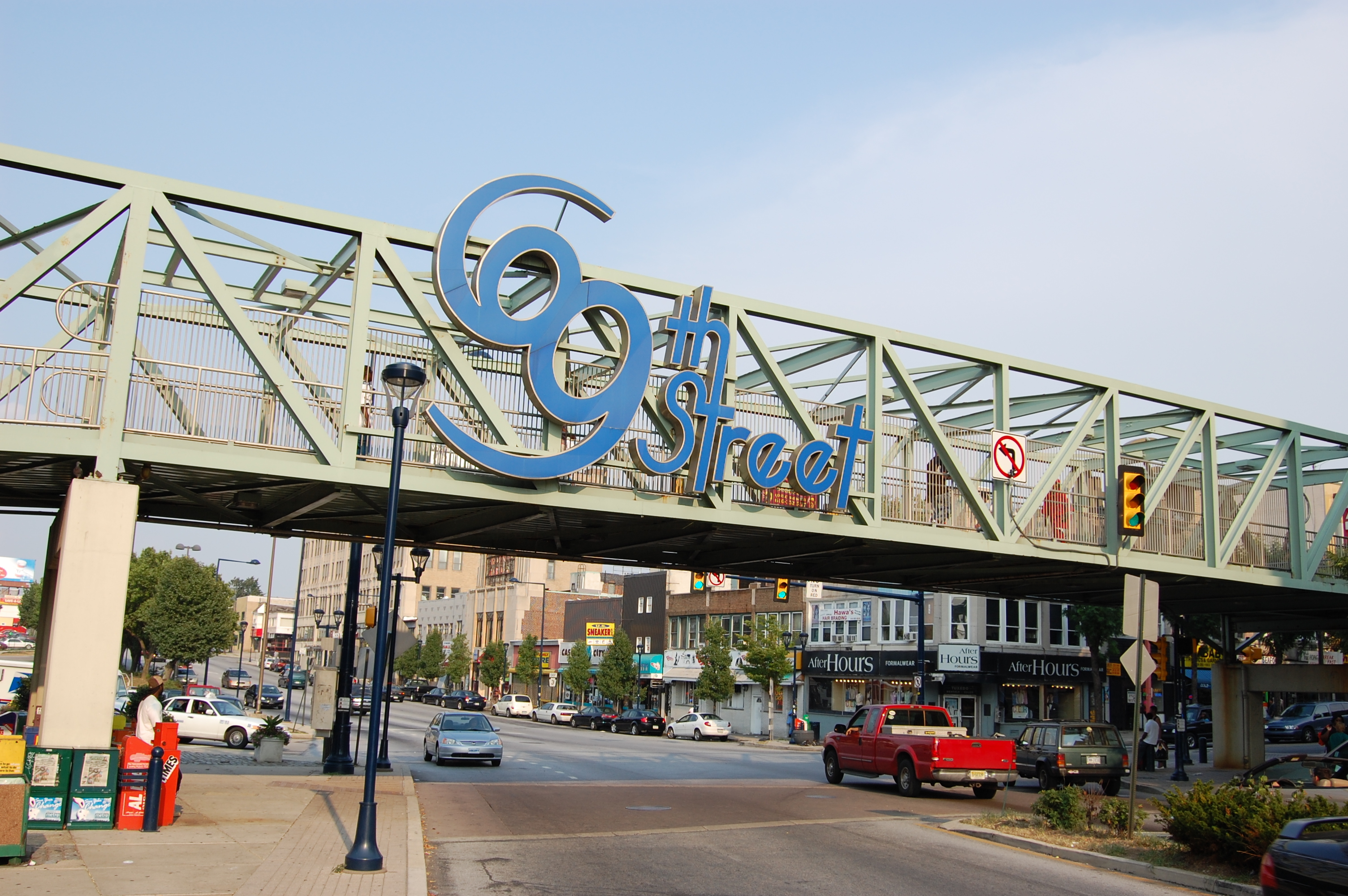
Footbridge at 69th Street Transportation Center

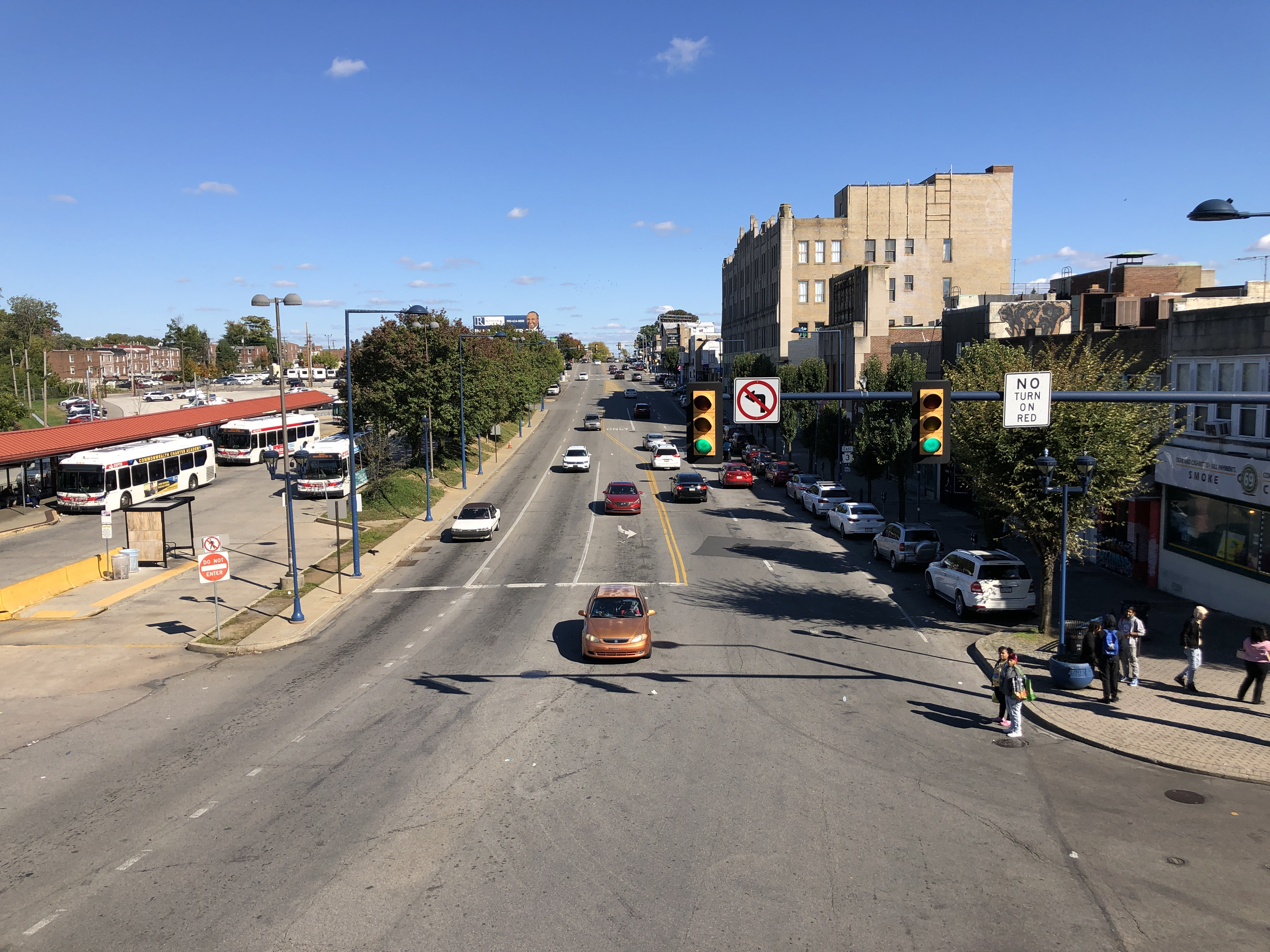
PA Route 3 eastbound at 69th Street in Upper Darby Township

SEPTA's 69th Street Transportation Center is located in Terminal Square on 69th Street. It serves as the western terminal stop of the Market–Frankford Line, the eastern terminal stop of the Norristown High Speed Line (formerly Route 100) and SEPTA trolley routes 101 and 102, as well as SEPTA Bus Routes 21, 30, 65, 68, 103, 104, 105, 107, 108, 109, 110, 111, 112, 113, 120, 123, and 126. The Norristown High Speed Line has stops in Upper Darby at 69th Street and Parkview station. Upper Darby Township is also served by SEPTA Bus Routes 42 and 115. SEPTA Regional Rail's Media/Wawa Line passes through the southern portion of Upper Darby Township, with stations at Secane and Primos.

As of 2022, there were 152.99 miles (246.21 km) of public roads in Upper Darby Township, of which 24.83 miles (39.96 km) were maintained by Pennsylvania Department of Transportation (PennDOT) and 128.16 miles (206.25 km) were maintained by the township.

Pennsylvania Route 3, which links Philadelphia and West Chester passes through the northern portion of Upper Darby Township as Market Street and the West Chester Pike. U.S. Route 1 follows Township Line Road along the northwestern edge of the township. U.S. Route 13 follows Church Lane and Baltimore Avenue through the far southeastern corner of the township.

=== Emergency services ===
Upper Darby Township is served by the 133-member Upper Darby Police Department, the Crozer-Keystone North Division Paramedics (based out of Delaware County Memorial Hospital), and the Upper Darby Township Fire Department, a combination paid/volunteer department which consists of a headquarters building and 5 stations:

- Company 20 – Garrettford-Drexel Hill (which is the only full-time volunteer station), housing two pumpers (engines), one ladder truck, and one rescue truck.
- Company 26 – Highland Park, housing one Squad Co, and one rescue truck.
- Company 36 – Cardington-Stonehurst, housing one pumper, one squirt, and one mask service unit
- Company 37 – Upper Darby, housing one ladder truck and one utility truck.
- Company 74 – Primos-Secane-Westbrook Park, one Quint, one pumper and one tower ladder truck.

== In popular culture ==
- The fictional Philadelphia neighborhood Darby Heights in the 2021 IFC film Last Call is based on Upper Darby and the film features shots from the Terminal Square and Highland Park neighborhoods.
- Singer-songwriter Steve Gunn's 2018 release "Stonehurst Cowboy" is about his father's childhood in Upper Darby's Stonehurst neighborhood.
- The 2012 David O. Russell film Silver Linings Playbook is set in Upper Darby.

== Notable people ==
- Lloyd Alexander (1924–2007), author
- Keith Andes (1920–2005), Broadway actor
- Patrice Banks (born 1982), engineer and mechanic, founder of Girls Auto Clinic
- Anthony Becht (born 1977), NFL football player
- Heather Boyd, Pennsylvania State Representative for the 163rd district (2023–present)
- Joe Burke (1884–1950), composer, pianist and actor
- Bnyx (born 1995), record producer and songwriter
- John Cappelletti (born 1952), NFL football player
- Dick Clark (1929–2012), entertainer
- Robert J. Clendening (1914–1982), Pennsylvania State Representative for Delaware County from 1949 to 1952
- Jim Croce (1943–1973), singer songwriter
- Mark Cronin, television producer
- Robert Crumb (born 1943), cartoonist
- Gina Curry (born 1972), educator, member of the Pennsylvania House of Representatives
- Margo L. Davidson (born 1962), broadcaster, former member of the Pennsylvania House of Representatives
- George Delahunty (born 1952), physiologist, endocrinologist, and professor at Goucher College
- Heather Donahue (born 1974), writer, actress
- H.D. (1886–1961), poet and novelist
- Masoumeh Ebtekar (born 1960), Vice President of Iran for Women and Family Affairs
- Tina Fey (born 1970), comedian, writer, actress
- D'or Fischer (born 1981), American-Israeli basketball player
- Derek Frey (born 1973), film producer and director
- Thomas Garrett (1789–1871), abolitionist
- Monica Horan (born 1963), actress
- Jamie Kennedy (born 1970), comedian
- Jeff LaBar (1963–2021) American guitarist in the glam metal band Cinderella
- Simoni Lawrence (born 1989), football player
- F. Joseph "Joe" Loeper (born 1944), American politician, represented the 26th senatorial district Pennsylvania State Senate, Republican Majority Leader
- David MacAdam (1910–1998), Physicist and color scientist
- Mike Manley (born 1961) Cartoonist
- Ed McMahon (1923–2009), co-host, Tonight Show with Johnny Carson
- Pat Meehan (born 1955), U.S. Representative Pennsylvania 7th District (2010–2018)
- Shannon Meehan, author and veteran's activist
- Nicholas Micozzie (1930–2020), Pennsylvania State Representative for the 163rd district (1979–2014)
- Terrence J. Nolen (born 1963), theater director, co-founder of the Arden Theater Company
- Cheri Oteri (born 1962), comedian, actress
- Sophonisba Angusciola Peale (1786–1859), ornithologist and artist
- Abraham L. Pennock (1786–1868), abolitionist and inventor
- Dorothy Germain Porter, golfer
- Jack Ramsay (1925–2014), NBA head coach
- Todd Rucci (born 1970), football player
- Todd Rundgren (born 1948), singer, songwriter, multi-instrumentalist and record producer
- Alvin Sargent (1927–2019), screenwriter
- Herb Sargent (1923–2005), screenwriter
- Mike Scioscia (born 1958) baseball player, manager Los Angeles Angels
- Coleman Sellers II (1827–1907), engineer, former president of the Franklin Institute
- John Sellers (1728–1804), scientist
- William Sellers (1824–1905), engineer and inventor
- Ed Stefanski, former NBA player, executive
- Marty Stern (born 1936), women's track coach
- Tim (born 1981), singer
- George Wackenhut (1919–2004), founder of the Wackenhut private security firm
- Paul Westhead (born 1939), NBA basketball coach
- William Wharton (1925–2008), author
- Michael Zabel (born 1978), Pennsylvania State Representative for the 163rd district (2019–2023)

== See also ==
- Har Jehuda Cemetery

Preceded by Yeadon	Bordering communities of Philadelphia; With: Millbourne	Succeeded by Haverford Township
