= Pennsylvania House of Representatives, District 163 =

American legislative district

Pennsylvania's 163rd State House of Representatives district
Representative
Heather Boyd; D–Upper Darby
- Population (2021): 63,755

The 163rd Pennsylvania House of Representatives District is located in southeastern Pennsylvania and has been represented by Democrat Heather Boyd since 2023.

== District profile ==
The 163rd district is located in Delaware County and includes the following areas:

- Aldan
- Clifton Heights
- Collingdale
- Darby Township (PART)
  - Ward 03
  - Ward 04
  - Ward 05
- Upper Darby Township (PART)
  - District 01
  - District 02
  - District 03 [PART, Divisions 01, 02, 03, 04, 05, 08, 09, 10 and 11]
  - District 05 [PART, Divisions 04, 06, 08 and 09]

== Representatives ==
Representative	Party	Years	District home	Note
Prior to 1969, seats were apportioned by county.
Mae W. Kernaghan	Republican	1969 – 1970		
Joseph T. Doyle	Democrat	1971 – 1978		
Nicholas Micozzie	Republican	1979 – 2014		
Jamie Santora	Republican	2014 – 2019		
Michael Zabel	Democrat	2019 – 2023		Resigned due to sexual harassment allegations.
Heather Boyd	Democrat	2023 – Present		Incumbent

== Recent election results ==
PA House special election, 2023: Pennsylvania House, District 163
Party	Candidate	Votes	%
Democratic	Heather Boyd	9,415	60.16
Republican	Kathleen Ford	6,040	38.60
Libertarian	Alfeia Goodwin	194	1.24
Total votes		15,649	100.00
Democratic hold			

2022 election
Party	Candidate	Votes	%
Democratic	Michael Zabel (incumbent)	16,257	64.8
Republican	Kenneth Rucci	8,426	33.6
Libertarian	Alfeia Goodwin	397	1.6
Total votes		25,080	100.0
Democratic hold			

2020 election
Party	Candidate	Votes	%
Democratic	Michael Zabel (incumbent)	22,259	60.3
Republican	Michael McCollum	14,680	39.7
Total votes		36,939	100.0
Democratic hold			

2018 election
Party	Candidate	Votes	%
Democratic	Michael Zabel	15,417	53.4
Republican	Jamie Santora (incumbent)	13,471	46.6
Total votes		28,888	100.0
Democratic gain from Republican			

2016 election
Party	Candidate	Votes	%
Republican	Jamie Santora (incumbent)	18,176	54.3
Democratic	Barbarann Keffer	15,313	45.7
Total votes		33,489	100.0
Republican hold			

2014 election
Party	Candidate	Votes	%
Republican	Jamie Santora	11,644	53.6
Democratic	Vincent Rongione	10,100	46.4
Total votes		21,744	100.0
Republican hold			

2012 election
Party	Candidate	Votes	%
Republican	Nicholas Micozzie (incumbent)	14,432	50.9
Democratic	Sheamus Bonner	13,937	49.1
Total votes		28,369	100.0
Republican hold			

2010 election
Party	Candidate	Votes	%
Republican	Nicholas Micozzie (incumbent)	11,891	57.2
Democratic	Shannon Meehan	8,333	40.1
Independent	Rodney Lacy	549	2.6
Total votes		20,773	100.0
Republican hold			
