= Jamie Santora =

American politician

James Santora

Member of the Pennsylvania House of Representatives from the 163rd district
- In office December 1, 2014 – November 30, 2018
- Preceded by: Nicholas Micozzie
- Succeeded by: Michael Zabel

Personal details
- Born: July 15, 1971 (age 55)
- Party: Republican
- Education: Cabrini College
- Occupation: Realtor

James R. Santora is an American politician from Pennsylvania who owns Santora Real Estate and is a former Republican member of the Pennsylvania House of Representatives for the 163rd district.

== Early life and education ==
Santora was born in Drexel Hill, Pennsylvania and graduated from Cardinal O'Hara High School in 1990. He received a B.S. in marketing from Cabrini College.

== Career ==
Santora worked as a real estate broker for O’Neill Properties Group for 16 years. He was elected to the Upper Darby Township council and served from 2011 to 2014. He was elected to the Pennsylvania House of Representatives for the 163rd district in 2014 and 2016,

He is the owner of Santora Real Estate, LP.

In the 2014 election, he defeated Vince Rongione for the seat formerly held by Nicholas Micozzie. He defeated Barbarann Keffer in 2016.

Santora was defeated in 2018 by Democrat Michael Zabel. In the 2019 election, Santora lost again, this time in a bid to become Upper Darby School Board Director. In the 2020 election, he was the chairman of an unsuccessful campaign for the Republican candidate for the 163rd district. He has returned to running his real estate business and other ventures. He is not considering running for any office at this time.

== Personal life ==
He is married to Amy and has three children.
