= Shannon Meehan =

Shannon P. Meehan
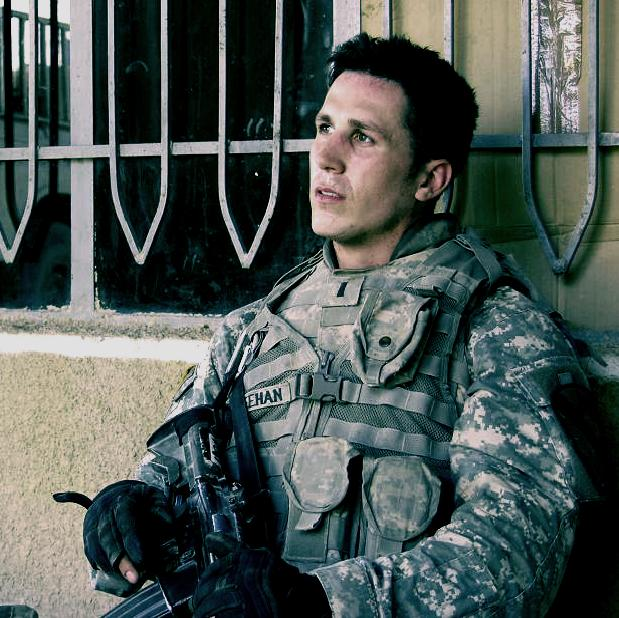
- Shannon P. Meehan, U.S. Army. (Iraq, 2007)
- Nickname: White 1
- Born: Philadelphia, Pennsylvania, U.S.
- Allegiance: United States of America
- Service years: 2005–2009
- Rank: Captain
- Conflicts: Battle of Baqubah, Iraq War
- Awards: Bronze Star, Purple Heart, Meritorious Service Medal, Army Commendation Medal for Valor
- Other work: Author of Beyond Duty, (written with Roger Thompson); Spokesman for veterans' issues; Substitute Teacher

Shannon P. Meehan is a public speaker, author of a critically acclaimed memoir and spokesman for veterans' issues. He is a retired captain in the United States Army. He was a tank platoon leader in the 1st Cavalry Division. He served with the U.S. Army in the Iraq War, where he earned the Bronze Star, the Purple Heart, and an Army Commendation Medal for Valor, among other honors. In September 2007, Meehan was injured in an IED strike during the Battle of Baqubah. Meehan spent two years completing rehabilitation and was officially retired in November 2009. Through speaking engagements across the country, Meehan has become a spokesperson for veterans suffering from traumatic brain injury and post traumatic stress disorder. Meehan, now retired, is finishing his degree to become an English teacher. He taught at North Penn High School in Lansdale, Pennsylvania, during the final part of the 2013–2014 school year.

== Early life ==
Born and raised in Upper Darby Township, Pennsylvania, Meehan attended Upper Darby High School, where in 2001, he was inducted into the Hall of Fame for his accomplishments in the sport of wrestling. He then attended the Virginia Military Institute, where he lettered in an NCAA Division I wrestling program and graduated as a Distinguished Military graduate and president of an honor society in 2005. He also studied at Oxford University, as well as receiving his master's degree in English at Villanova University.

== Military career ==
Following graduation, he was commissioned as a Second Lieutenant in the U.S. Army's Armor Branch, and in May 2006, he was assigned to 1st Battalion, 12th Cavalry Regiment of the 1st Cavalry Division in Fort Hood, Texas. In October 2006, Meehan deployed to Iraq. While deployed overseas as a tank platoon leader, Meehan led over 700 combat and civil operations while commanding a large area of land inside Iraq's Diyala Province. He also managed and oversaw investments to improve infrastructures and civil and economic growth within his area of land. Meehan was rated his battalion's top platoon leader.

In September 2007, Meehan was injured in an IED strike during the Battle of Baqubah. He suffered traumatic brain injury, as well as other physical injuries. He spent two years completing physical and cognitive rehabilitation at Fort Hood's Carl R. Darnall Army Medical Center. For his service, he was awarded the Bronze Star, the Purple Heart and an Army Commendation for Valor in combat, among other honors.

He was officially retired from the United States Army in November 2009.

== Author ==
While completing rehabilitation at Fort Hood, Meehan wrote the nationally acclaimed memoir, Beyond Duty (written with Roger Thompson, Polity Press), which chronicles firsthand the challenges facing soldiers in today's wars. Released in September 2009, Beyond Duty has become the fastest-selling book in the press's history, and was named Military Writers Society of America's Book of the Month for the month of its international release. Beyond Duty was called "powerful and heart-breaking" by acclaimed author Tim O'Brien.

== Speaker and veterans advocate ==
Meehan has traveled the country sharing his story, speaking at places including the USC Gould School of Law, Harvard University, the United States Military Academy at West Point, Virginia Military Institute, Syracuse University, and Upper Darby High School. He has discussed his experiences and the importance of narrative for soldiers on CNN, NBC, and in The New York Times, where his own op-ed piece, "Distant Wars, Constant Ghosts," became the most-viewed Op-Ed of that week. Meehan has become an advocate for veterans, and is considered the face of those suffering from traumatic brain injury (TBI) and post-traumatic stress disorder (PTSD), injuries specific to the Iraq and Afghanistan wars, who have gone on to lead successful lives.

== 2010 Pennsylvania State House Campaign ==
On March 3, 2010, Meehan announced his candidacy for Pennsylvania House of Representatives, District 163. He sought to replace Nicholas Micozzie, the thirty-two year Republican incumbent. Meehan ran unopposed for the Democratic nomination in the Democratic primary on May 18, 2010. He lost to Micozzie on November 2, 2010.

== Personal life ==
Meehan lives in Bucks County, Pennsylvania, with his wife, Amanda Jane, and three sons, Brady Cole, Jameson Riley and Killian Conor Meehan.
