= Mae Kernaghan =

American politician

Mae W. Kernaghan

Member of the Pennsylvania House of Representatives from the 163rd district
- In office January 7, 1969 – November 30, 1970
- Preceded by: District Created
- Succeeded by: Joseph Doyle

Member of the Pennsylvania House of Representatives from the Delaware County district
- In office January 2, 1957 – November 30, 1968

Personal details
- Born: Mae Winter; April 23, 1901 Philadelphia, Pennsylvania
- Died: September 29, 1980 (aged 79) Darby, Pennsylvania
- Party: Republican
- Spouse: Frank J. Kernaghan Sr.
- Children: Frank J. Kernaghan Jr.

Mae Winter Kernaghan (April 23, 1901 – September 29, 1980) was an American politician from Pennsylvania who served as a Republican member of the Pennsylvania House of Representatives for Delaware County from 1957 to 1966 and for the 163rd district from 1967 to 1970.

== Formative years ==
Born as Mae Winter in Philadelphia, Pennsylvania, on April 23, 1901, Mae W. Kernaghan was educated in the city's public schools. During World War II, she volunteered with the American Red Cross (ARC) as a volunteer with its Delaware County canteen program and with the ARC's Prisoner of War Packaging service.

After volunteering with The Salvation Army for eight years, she was hired as the director of that non-profit organization's annual fundraising initiative (the "Maintenance Campaign") for Delaware County in 1944, a position she continued to hold as she advanced up the ranks to become the county chapter's public relations director. She remained with the organization until sometime in 1955.

A longtime resident of Yeadon, Pennsylvania, with her husband, Frank J. Kernaghan, Sr., who was deputy warden at Broadmeadows Prison during the 1950s, she also served as treasurer and president of the Yeadon Public Library in Yeadon, Pennsylvania.

== Political and legislative career ==
Elected as an alternate delegate to the Republican National Convention in 1944, Kernaghan was also a member of Pennsylvania's Republican State Committee and vice chair of the Delaware County Republican Committee.

Subsequently elected to the Pennsylvania House of Representatives to represent Delaware County, beginning in 1956, she served six consecutive terms. In March 1957, she co-sponsored legislation with Margarette S. Kooker, Beatrice Z. Miller and Ruth S. Donahue to criminalize the transportation of obscene material and increase the fines and jail time for distributors of pornographic magazines and other obscene materials. The bill passed the house by a vote of 181 to 1. In June 1959, she again partnered with Kooker, a fellow Republican, and Democratic representatives Samuel W. Frank and Marion L. Munley, to co-sponsor legislation that would require plastic bag manufacturers to label their bags "with a visible warning of suffocation dangers" with penalties of thirty days in jail or fines up to $100 for failure to comply. The legislation was proposed in response to recent plastic bag-related suffocation deaths of infants in Pennsylvania.

A member of the Pennsylvania House committee on boroughs, Kernaghan also served, from 1960 to 1961, as Delaware County's representative on the joint legislative committee which oversaw "congressional reapportionment and helped defeat a proposal to add four county municipalities to Philadelphia congressional districts." In January 1963, she was appointed vice chair of the house's Public Health and Welfare Committee.

Later elected as majority caucus chair of the Pennsylvania House, she served in that role from 1967 to 1968, and was then elected as minority caucus chair, a post she held from 1969 to 1970. In addition, she was appointed to the Joint State Government Commission, and served in that capacity from 1967 to 1970. She declined to run for reelection in 1970, and retired from the legislature.

== Community service ==
Past president of the Wimodausis Club of Yeadon and the Women's Club of Yeadon, and president of the Delaware County Park and Recreation Board, Kernaghan was also a member of the board of directors of Camp Sunshine, a summer recreational program for undernourished and underprivileged children in Delaware County, and a member of the Business and Professional Women's Club in Yeadon.

== Death and interment ==
Kernaghan died on September 29, 1980, in Lansdowne, Pennsylvania, and was interred at the Fernwood Cemetery and Mausoleum in Fernwood, Pennsylvania.
