= Aldan, Pennsylvania =

Borough in Pennsylvania, US

- Borough
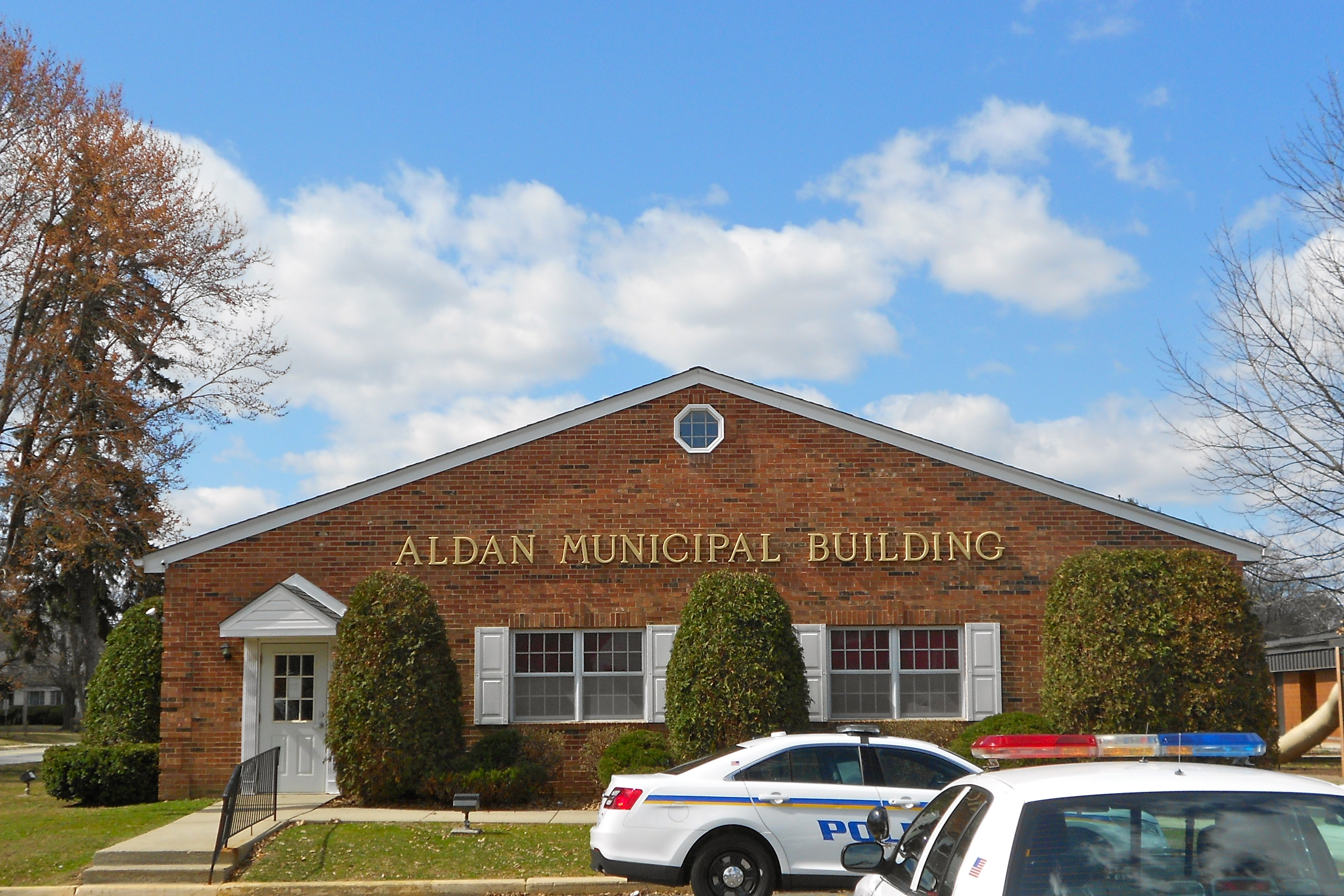
- Municipal Building

- Location in Delaware County and the U.S. state of Pennsylvania

- Location in Pennsylvania Location in the United States
- Coordinates: 39°55′14″N 75°17′12″W
- Country: United States
- State: Pennsylvania
- County: Delaware

Government
  - Mayor: Michael Ceci

Area
  - Total: 0.60 sq mi (1.55 km^{2})
  - Land: 0.60 sq mi (1.55 km^{2})
  - Water: 0 sq mi (0.00 km^{2})
- Elevation: 128 ft (39 m)

Population (2020)
  - Total: 4,244
  - Density: 7,112.1/sq mi (2,746.01/km^{2})
- Time zone: UTC-5 (EST)
  - Summer (DST): UTC-4 (EDT)
- ZIP code: 19018
- Area codes: 610, 484
- FIPS code: 42-00676
- Website: www.aldanpa.gov

Aldan is a borough in Delaware County, Pennsylvania, United States. The population was 4,244 at the 2020 census.

== Government ==
Aldan Borough is governed by a mayor and a borough council consisting of seven members. All offices are four-year terms, with the terms of the council seats staggered (four seats are up in 2027; three seats will be up in 2029).

The Aldan Police Department is appointed by the borough council. The management team consists of a chief, a sergeant and a sergeant detective and is supported by approximately nine patrol officers.

Aldan Borough is part of the Pennsylvania 5th Congressional District, represented by Rep. Mary Gay Scanlon, the Pennsylvania House of Representatives, District 163, represented by Heather Boyd and the Pennsylvania Senate, District 26, represented by Tim Kearney.

== Geography ==
According to the U.S. Census Bureau, the borough has a total area of 0.6 square miles (1.6 km^{2}), all land.

== Transportation ==
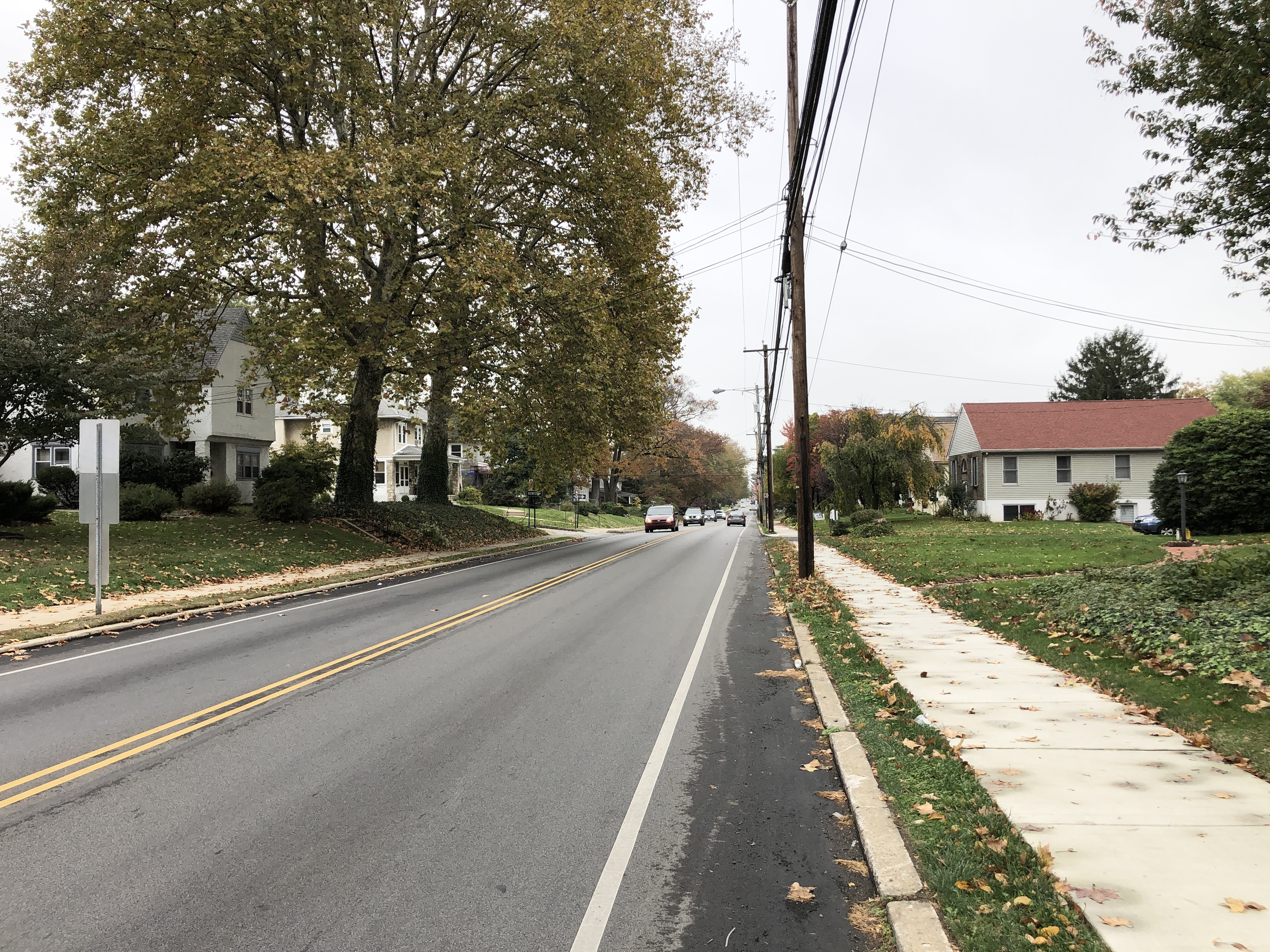
Providence Road in Aldan

In 2010, there were 13.05 miles (21.00 km) of public roads in Aldan, of which 3.00 miles (4.83 km) were maintained by the Pennsylvania Department of Transportation (PennDOT) and 10.05 miles (16.17 km) were maintained by the borough.

No numbered highways serve Aldan directly. The main thoroughfares include Providence Road and Clifton Avenue, which intersect near the center of town.

== Demographics ==
Historical population
Census	Pop.	Note	%±
1900	296		—
1910	661		123.3%
1920	1,136		71.9%
1930	2,269		99.7%
1940	2,642		16.4%
1950	3,430		29.8%
1960	4,324		26.1%
1970	5,001		15.7%
1980	4,671		−6.6%
1990	4,549		−2.6%
2000	4,313		−5.2%
2010	4,152		−3.7%
2020	4,244		2.2%

=== 2020 census ===
As of the 2020 census, Aldan had a population of 4,244. The median age was 42.3 years. 19.5% of residents were under the age of 18 and 17.5% of residents were 65 years of age or older. For every 100 females there were 89.5 males, and for every 100 females age 18 and over there were 86.8 males age 18 and over.

100.0% of residents lived in urban areas, while 0.0% lived in rural areas.

There were 1,718 households in Aldan, of which 26.8% had children under the age of 18 living in them. Of all households, 41.9% were married-couple households, 19.2% were households with a male householder and no spouse or partner present, and 31.5% were households with a female householder and no spouse or partner present. About 28.8% of all households were made up of individuals and 11.7% had someone living alone who was 65 years of age or older.

There were 1,805 housing units, of which 4.8% were vacant. The homeowner vacancy rate was 1.3% and the rental vacancy rate was 8.0%.

Racial composition as of the 2020 census
Race	Number	Percent
White	2,130	50.2%
Black or African American	1,592	37.5%
American Indian and Alaska Native	2	0.0%
Asian	194	4.6%
Native Hawaiian and Other Pacific Islander	0	0.0%
Some other race	129	3.0%
Two or more races	197	4.6%
Hispanic or Latino (of any race)	196	4.6%

=== 2000 census ===
At the 2000 census, there were 4,313 people, 1,751 households and 1,157 families residing in the borough. The population density was 7,235.4 per square mile (2,793.6/km^{2}). There were 1,817 housing units at an average density of 3,048.1 per square mile (1,176.9/km^{2}). The racial make-up of the borough was 93.30% White, 4.34% African American, 0.19% Native American, 1.34% Asian, 0.12% from other races and 0.72% from two or more races. Hispanic or Latino of any race were 0.93% of the population.

There were 1,751 households, of which 28.6% had children under the age of 18 living with them, 51.6% were married couples living together, 10.1% had a female householder with no husband present and 33.9% were non-families. 29.5% of all households were made up of individuals and 12.8% had someone living alone who was 65 years of age or older. The average household size was 2.46 and the average family size was 3.08.

22.8% of the population were under the age of 18, 6.9% from 18 to 24, 30.4% from 25 to 44, 24.1% from 45 to 64 and 15.9% were 65 years of age or older. The median age was 39 years. For every 100 females there were 90.3 males. For every 100 females age 18 and over, there were 86.1 males.

The median household income was $47,292 and the median family income was $59,595. Males had a median income of $42,047 and females $31,129. The per capita income was $22,134. About 4.0% of families and 5.9% of the population were below the poverty line, including 6.5% of those under age 18 and 12.4% of those age 65 or over.

== Notable features ==
Aldan has a trolley stop museum at Providence Road, a swim club, a non-denominational church named Aldan Union Church, a municipal building and a Veterans Memorial that has been expanded into a park outside of Aldan Elementary School.

== Parks ==
- Aldan Gateway Park (2007)
- Aldan Veterans Memorial Park (2000–Present), dedicated to the veterans of Aldan, There is playground equipment in the background of the park.
- Carr Field (1990s), has two baseball fields and basketball court.
- Duffy Field (1990s)
- Jack Edmundson Park (2007), dedicated to Jack P. Edmundson, a former mayor. It was formerly known as the Triangle and located at W. Providence Road at Ridley Avenue.
- Providence Park (2006), former historical house purchased by Aldan Union Church and converted into a park.

== Education ==
William Penn School District serves Aldan. The district was created in 1972; prior to that year, Aldan was in the Lansdowne-Aldan School District.

- Aldan Elementary School (K-6)
- Penn Wood Middle School (7-8) (Darby)
- Penn Wood High School, Cypress Street Campus (9) (Yeadon) and Green Avenue Campus (10-12) (Lansdowne)
