= Upper Darby High School =

Coordinates: 39.9567°N 75.2846°W

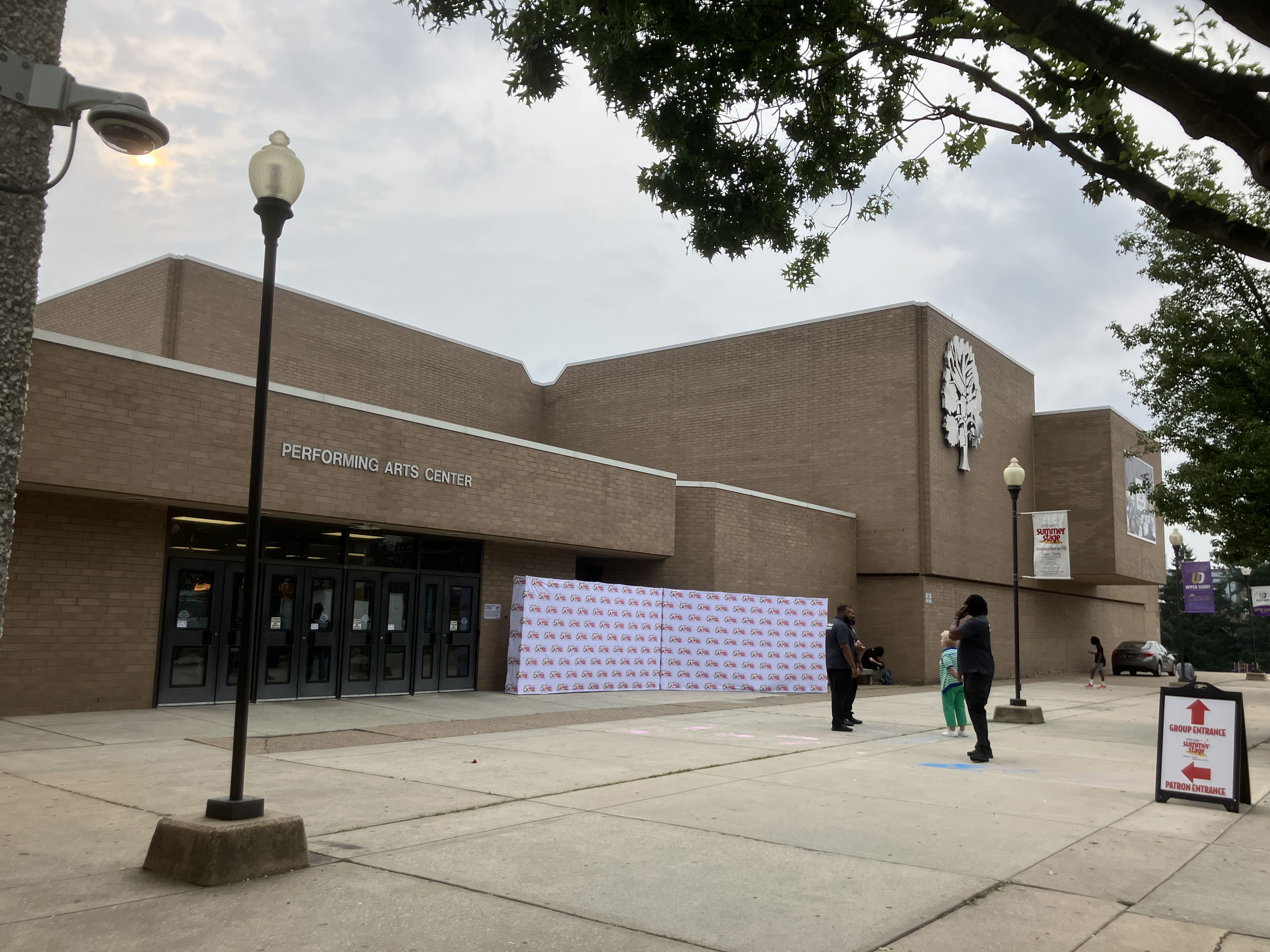
- The Upper Darby Performing Arts Center in 2025
- 601 North Lansdowne Avenue, Drexel Hill, Upper Darby, Pennsylvania, U.S.

Information
- Type: Public high school
- Motto: Where Every One Is Royalty
- Established: 1895
- Principal: Craig L. Parkinson
- Faculty: 233.23 FTE
- Enrollment: 4,388 (2023-24)
- Student to teacher ratio: 16.49
- Colors: Purple and gold
- Nickname: Royals
- Newspaper: The Acorn
- Yearbook: The Oak
- Information: 610-622-7000
- Website: upperdarbyhigh.upperdarbysd.org

Upper Darby High School (UDHS) is a four-year public high school located in Upper Darby Township in Delaware County, Pennsylvania, United States. It is part of the Upper Darby School District. Established in 1895, it is the oldest high school in Delaware County.

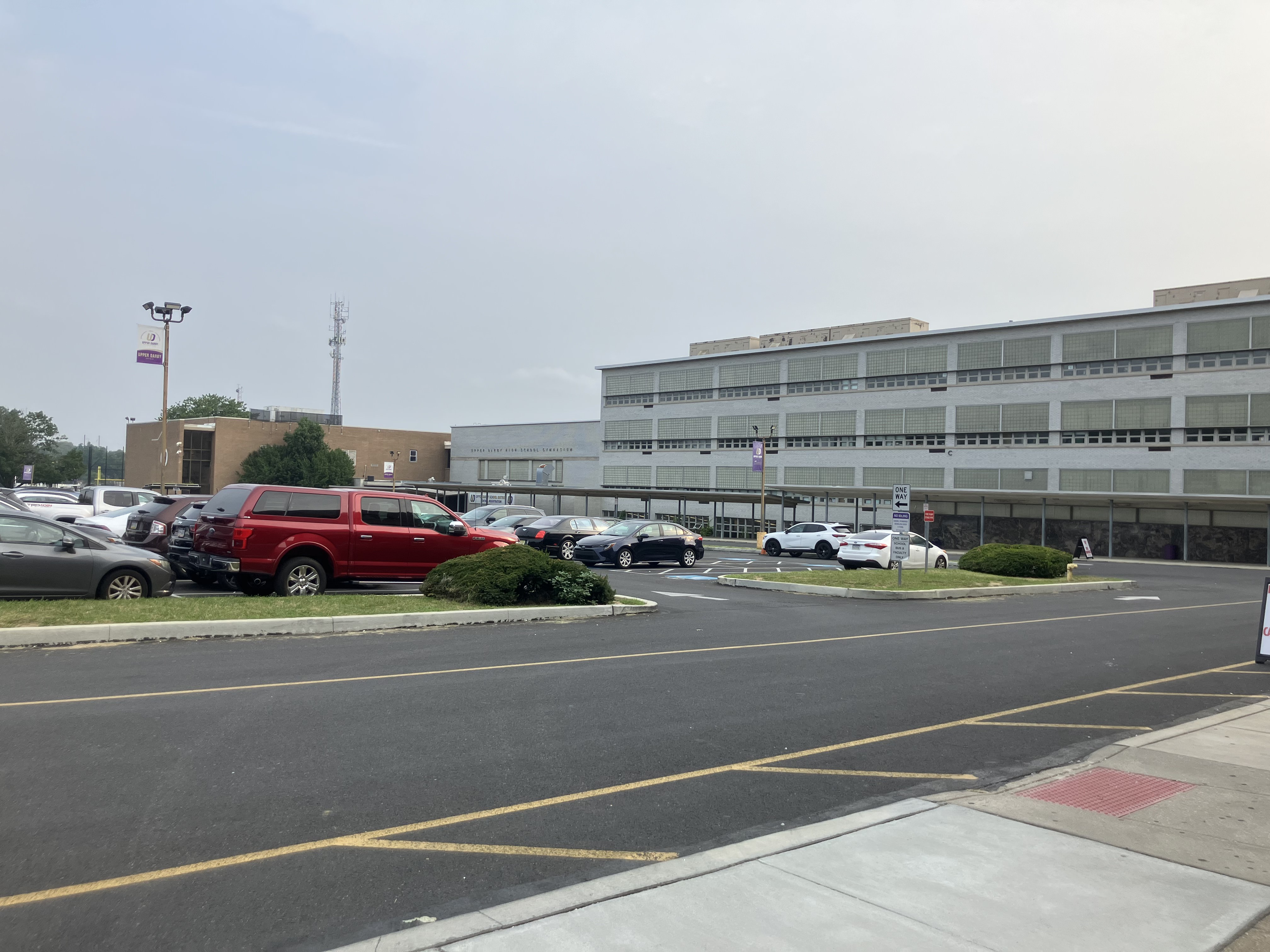
An image of Upper Darby High School's parking lot in 2025

As of the 2023-2024 school year, the school had an enrollment of 4,388 students and 233.23 classroom teachers (on an FTE basis), for a student-teacher ratio of 16.49.

The population is diverse, with over 55 nationalities of students. It has a long-established football rivalry with Monsignor Bonner High School, located less than a block away. Upper Darby High School was a part of the inspiration for Upper Darby alumna Tina Fey's movie comedy Mean Girls.

The mascot of Upper Darby High is the Royal, which is portrayed as a lion. In previous years, it was a court jester. The school emblem is the royal oak tree, the yearbook is named the Oak, and the newspaper is called the Acorn. An Acorn award is rewarded every year at the UDAEF Sweet Night Out Foundation Ball in February.

Upper Darby Senior High School is one of the largest high schools in Pennsylvania by enrollment. The High School is also home to the Upper Darby Performing Arts Center, and the Summer Stage program.

== Campus ==
The campus is adjacent to, but not within, the Drexel Hill census-designated place. It has a Drexel Hill postal address.

== Demographics ==
Race/Ethnicity as of 2019-2020
Group	Number of Students	Percentage
Total	3845	100%
Black	1969	51.21%
White	849	22.08%
Asian	581	15.11%
Hispanic	362	9.41%
Two of More Races	81	2.11%
American Indian/Alaska Native	3	0.08%
Native Hawaiian/Pacific Islander	0	0.00%

Gender as of 2019-2020
Group	Number of Students	Percentage
Total	3845	100%
Male	1949	50.69%
Female	1896	49.31%

== Arts ==
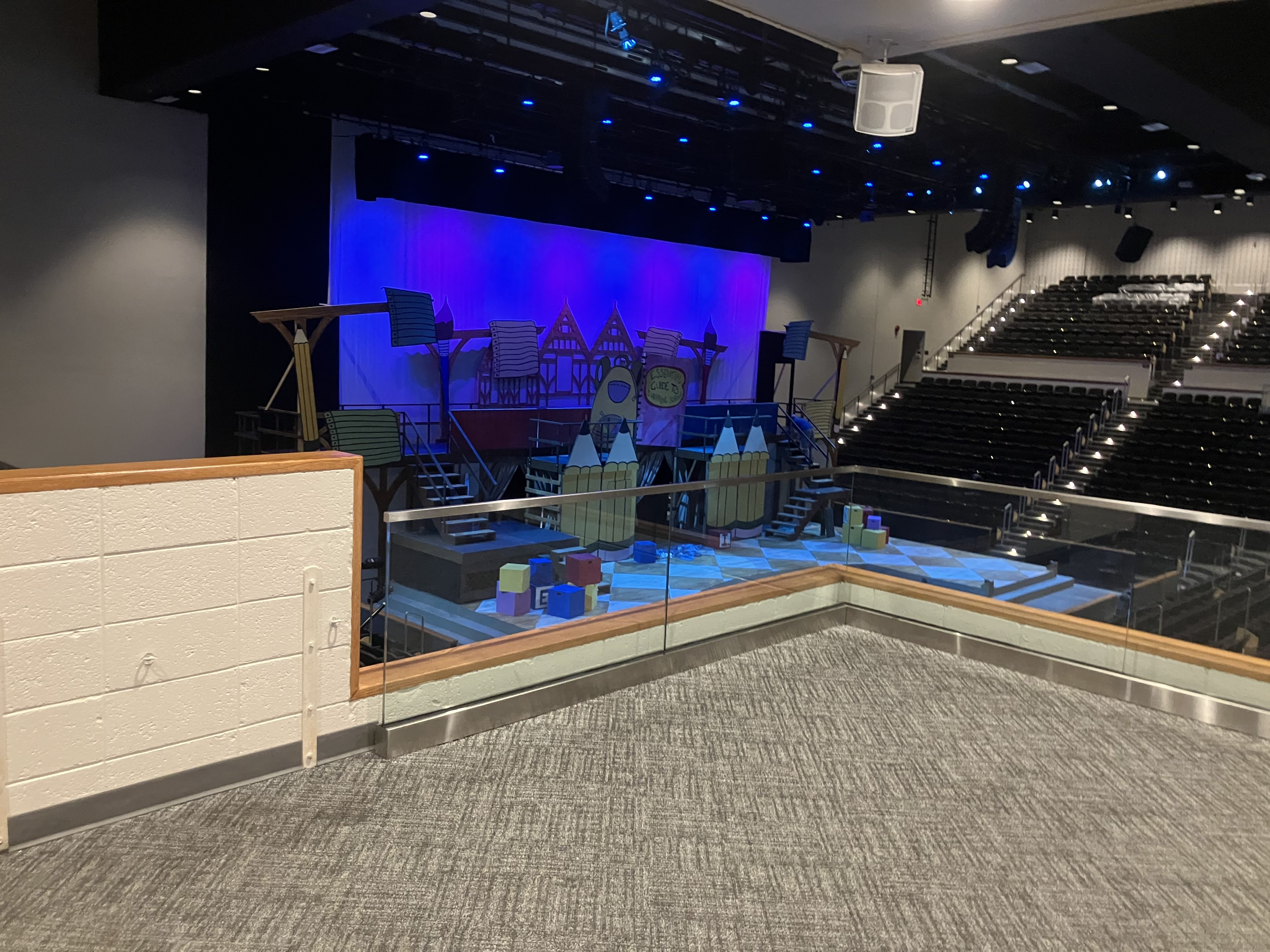
The Upper Darby High School Auditorium/Upper Darby Performing Arts Center in July, 2025

Upper Darby High School is home to the Upper Darby Performing Arts Center, a nearly 1,800-seat theater that hosts not only school functions, but also between 200 and 400 events annually. During the summer, the arts center hosts the largest summer theater group in Delaware County: Summer Stage, with over 200 participants in multiple musicals. Harry Dietzler founded the Summer Stage program in 1976.

== Extracurriculars ==
Upper Darby High School offers a wide variety of clubs and activities, as well as an extensive sports program.

=== Sports ===
Upper Darby sports teams compete in the Central League.

According to the PIAA directory from July 2012, the district funds:

- Boys Sports:
  - Baseball – AAAAAA
  - Basketball – AAAAAA
  - Cross Country – AAA
  - Football – AAAAAA
  - Golf – AAA
  - Indoor Track and Field – AAAA
  - Lacrosse – AAA
  - Soccer – AAAA
  - Swimming and Diving -AAA
  - Tennis – AAA
  - Track and Field – AAA
  - Wrestling – AAA
- Girls Sports:
  - Basketball – AAAAAA
  - Cheerleading – AAAA
  - Cross Country – AAA
  - Field Hockey – AAA
  - Golf – AAA
  - Indoor Track and Field – AAAA
  - Lacrosse – AAA
  - Soccer (Fall) – AAA
  - Softball – AAAAAA
  - Swimming and Diving – AAA
  - Girls' Tennis – AAA
  - Track and Field – AAA
  - Volleyball – AAAA

== Notable alumni ==
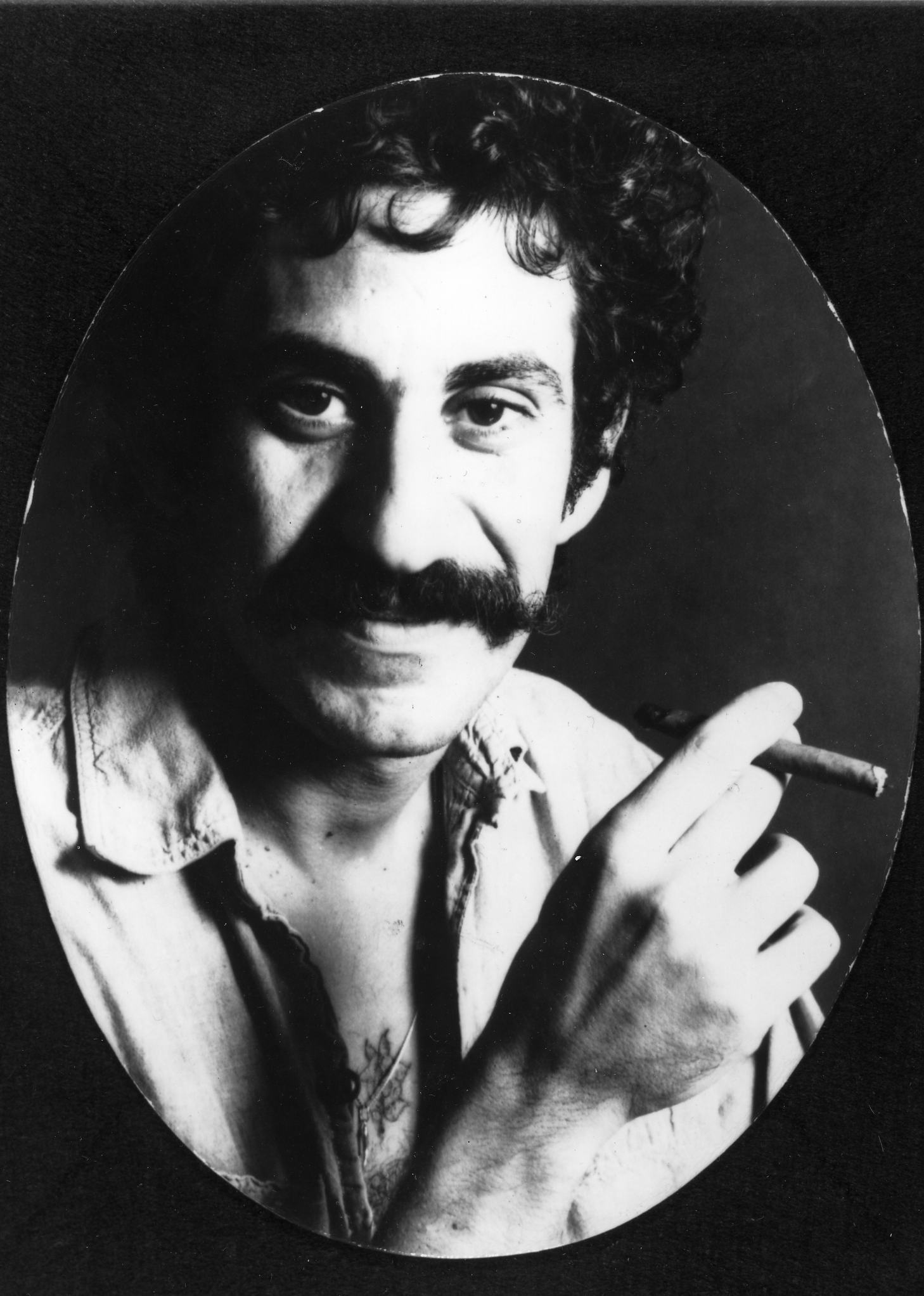
Jim Croce

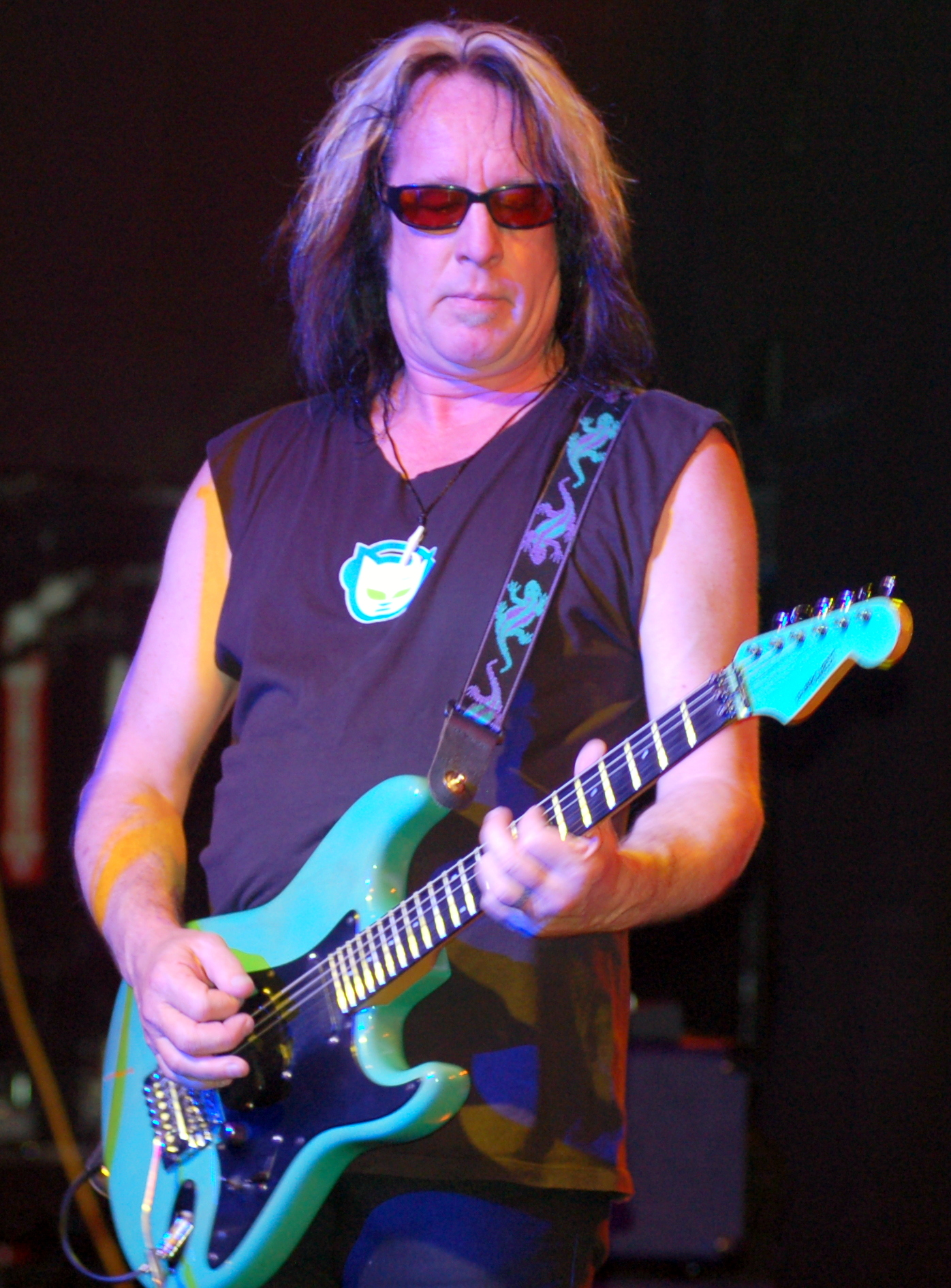
Todd Rundgren

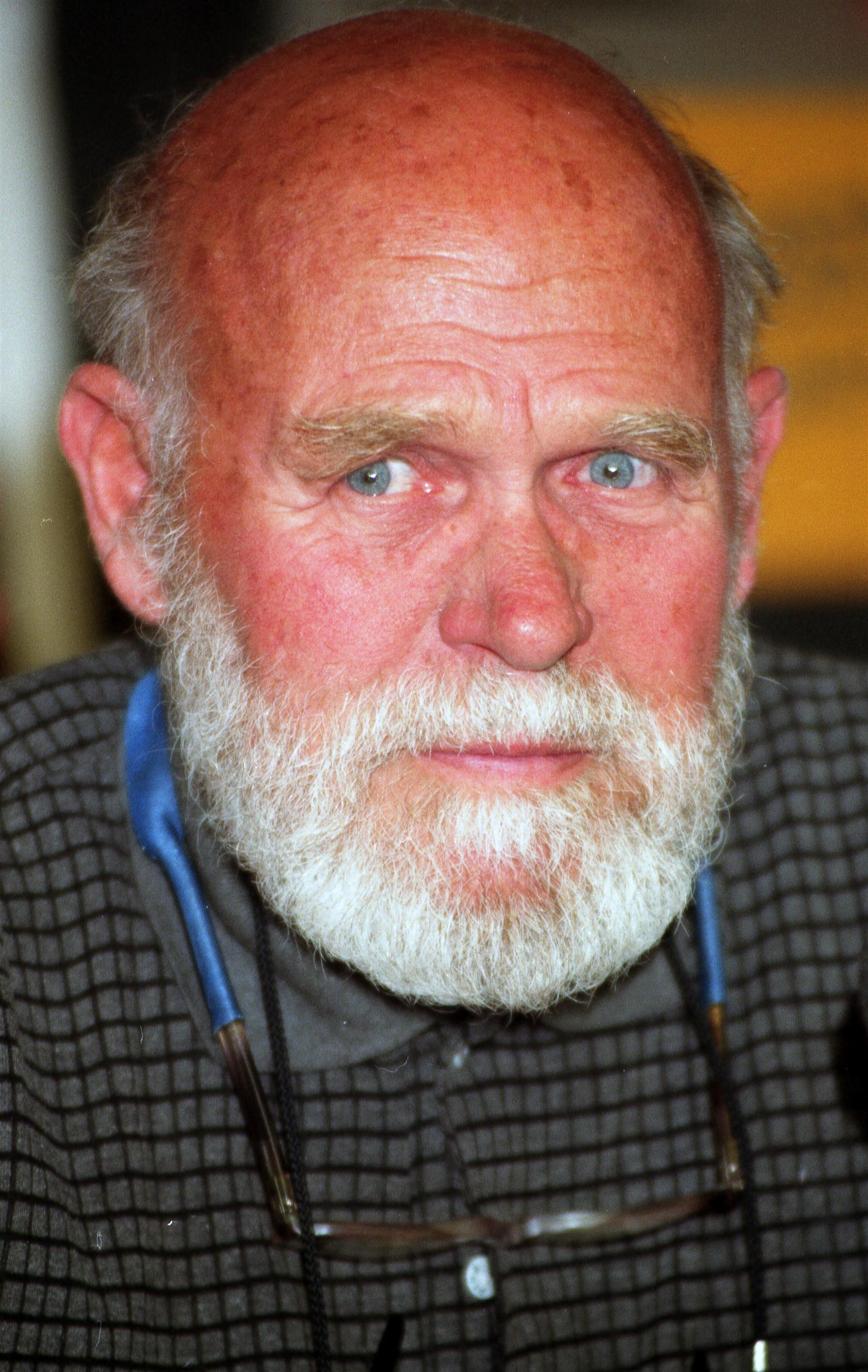
William Wharton

Upper Darby High School's Wall of Fame committee recognizes individuals who have become leaders in their industries. Alumni recognized on Upper Darby High School's Wall of Fame members are indicated with WoF after their biographical summary:

- Lloyd Alexander, former author and writer, The Black Cauldron (WoF)
- Keith Andes, former Broadway and film actor
- Chuck Dixon, comic book writer (WoF)
- Mario Civera, former Pennsylvania State Representative (WoF)
- Jim Croce, former singer-songwriter (WoF)
- Mark Cronin, creator and producer of VH1 shows (WoF)
- Tina Fey, former senior writer, Saturday Night Live, and scriptwriter and co-star, Mean Girls and 30 Rock WoF
- D'or Fischer, former professional basketball player, Israeli National League
- Derek Frey, film director and producer
- D. Barry Gibbons, former Pennsylvania State Representative
- Kermit Gordon, former Brookings Institution president and former Office of Management and Budget director WoF
- Rei Hance, actress, The Blair Witch Project and Taken
- Chris Hartmire, minister and civil rights activist
- Jeff LaBar, former rock musician, Cinderella
- Simoni Lawrence, former professional football player, Canadian Football League
- Bob Lloyd, former professional basketball player, New York Nets, and NCAA First Team All-American at Rutgers
- F. Joseph Loeper, former Pennsylvania State Senator and Majority Leader (WoF)
- David MacAdam, former head of image structure at Eastman Kodak Research Laboratory Optical Society of America president, discovered MacAdam ellipses
- Shannon Meehan, Iraq War veteran, author, disabled Veterans activist (WoF)
- Terrence J. Nolen, artistic director, Arden Theatre Company (WoF)
- Grace O'Connell, University of California, Berkeley bioengineer (WoF)
- Dorothy Germain Porter, amateur golfer, U.S. Women's Amateur golf champion in 1949 and U.S. Senior Women's Amateur champion in 1977, 1980, 1981, 1983 (WoF)
- Jack Ramsay, former college and professional basketball coach and broadcaster (WoF)
- Maaly Raw, hip hop producer for Lil Uzi Vert and others
- Todd Rucci, former professional football player, New England Patriots
- Todd Rundgren, rock musician and award-winning record producer
- Alvin Sargent, two-time Academy Award winner for Julia and Ordinary People (WoF)
- Marty Stern, former women's cross-country coach, Villanova Wildcats (WoF)
- George Wackenhut, Wackenhut founder (WoF)
- Floyd Wedderburn, former professional football player, Seattle Seahawks
- Carolyn "Bunny" Welsh, former Chester County, Pennsylvania sheriff and one of 22 female sheriffs in the U.S. WoF
- William Wharton, writer, Birdy, which was adapted into a film of the same name (WoF)
