= Joseph T. Doyle =

American politician

Member of the Pennsylvania House of Representatives from the 163rd district
- In office January 5, 1971 – November 30, 1978
- Preceded by: Mae Kernaghan
- Succeeded by: Nicholas Micozzie

Personal details
- Born: October 6, 1931 Ridley Park, Pennsylvania, US
- Died: December 18, 2012 (aged 81) West Chester, Pennsylvania, US
- Party: Democratic

Joseph Ted Doyle (October 6, 1931 – December 18, 2012) was an American politician and judge from Pennsylvania who served as a Democratic member of the Pennsylvania House of Representatives for the 163rd district from 1971 to 1978. He also served as judge of the Commonwealth Court of Pennsylvania from 1982 to 2002 including as president judge from 1992 to 2002.

== Early life and education ==
Doyle was born in Ridley Park, Pennsylvania to Frank J. and Mary Bellwoar Doyle and graduated from St. James High School in Chester, Pennsylvania. He received a B.S. degree from La Salle College in 1951, a J.D. from Villanova University Law School in 1958 and a LL.M. from the University of Virginia in 1990.

== Career ==
Doyle worked as an attorney, as editor of the Delaware County Legal Journal, as solicitor for the Borough of Yeadon and as solicitor for the Borough of Brookhaven Zoning Board.

He was elected to the Pennsylvania House of Representatives for the 163rd district in 1971 and served 4 consecutive terms until 1978. He was not a candidate for reelection in 1979. He had an unsuccessful campaign for the Pennsylvania State Senate in 1978 and an unsuccessful campaign for reelection to the House in 1980.

He was elected judge of the Commonwealth Court of Pennsylvania and served from 1982 to 2002 including as president judge from 1992 to 2002.

He received an honorary Doctor of Laws degree from Widener University in 2001.
