= Derek Frey =

American film producer and director

- Born: April 23, 1973 (age 53); Drexel Hill, Upper Darby Township, Pennsylvania, U.S.
- Education: Upper Darby High School; West Chester University (BA)
- Occupations: Producer; director
- Years active: 1995–present
- Organization: Tim Burton Productions
- Notable work: Frankenweenie; Big Eyes; Dumbo
- Website: derekfreyfilms.com

Derek Frey (born April 23, 1973) is an American film producer and director. He is best known for his long-time collaboration with director Tim Burton, serving as a producer on major studio films including Miss Peregrine's Home for Peculiar Children, Sweeney Todd: The Demon Barber of Fleet Street, Corpse Bride, Charlie and the Chocolate Factory, Frankenweenie, Big Eyes, Alice in Wonderland, Dumbo, and others.

== Early life and education ==
Frey was born on April 23, 1973, in the Drexel Hill section of Upper Darby Township, Pennsylvania, near Philadelphia. He graduating from Upper Darby High School. Frey attended West Chester University and graduated with a BA in communication studies.

== Career ==
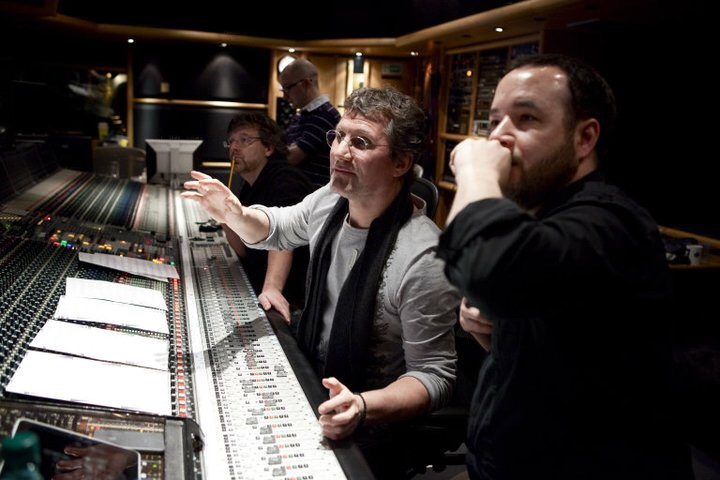
Derek Frey (right) recording at Air Studios with Andy Richards, Mike Higham & Ric Levy, 2011. Photograph c/o Leah Gallo

Frey began his career in the film industry in 1996 as an assistant for Tim Burton and an employee of Tim Burton Productions. He worked as Burton's assistant on Mars Attacks!, Sleepy Hollow, Planet of the Apes, and Big Fish. In 2001, he became the head of Tim Burton Productions. He would go on to earn producer credits in a variety of Tim Burton films including Alice in Wonderland, Dark Shadows, Big Eyes, Frankenweenie, Miss Peregrine's Home for Peculiar Children, Corpse Bride, and Sweeney Todd.

Frey also directs and produces under the banner, Lazer Film Productions. The company largely produces short films and music videos. His 2016 short film, Green Lake, was shown at over 40 film festivals at which it earned 47 awards including "Best Horror" at the Los Angeles Independent Film Festival Awards. Other short films produced and directed by Frey include Kill the Engine, Motel Providence, Sky Blue Collar, The Day the Dolls Struck Back!, The Ballad of Sandeep (starring actor, Deep Roy), and numerous others. Frey produced Burton's live-action adaptation of Dumbo, which was released in March 2019.

== Filmography ==
=== Feature films ===
Year	Title	Role	Notes
2005	Charlie and the Chocolate Factory	Associate producer	
2005	Corpse Bride	Associate producer	
2007	Sweeney Todd: The Demon Barber of Fleet Street	Associate producer	
2010	Alice in Wonderland	Associate producer	
2011	A Conversation with Danny Elfman and Tim Burton	Producer	Documentary
2012	Dark Shadows	Associate producer	
2012	Abraham Lincoln: Vampire Hunter	Associate producer	
2012	Frankenweenie	Co-producer	
2014	Big Eyes	Executive producer	
2016	Miss Peregrine's Home for Peculiar Children	Executive producer	
2019	Dumbo	Producer	
2022	In Search of Tomorrow	Producer	
2024	Aliens Expanded	Producer	

=== Short films ===
Year	Title	Director	Producer	Writer	Notes
1995	Verge of Darkness	Yes	Yes	Yes	Also actor
1999	UFO: The Burbank Chronicles	Yes	Yes	Yes	
2001	The Upper Hand	Yes	Yes	Yes	
2002	The Day the Dolls Struck Back	Yes	Yes	Yes	
2007	4th and 99	Yes	No	No	
2008	America's Game	Yes	Yes	No	
2010	The Curse of the Sacred Stone	Yes	Yes	Yes	
2011	The Ballad of Sandeep	Yes	Yes	No	
2012	Vampires Kiss/Blood Inside	Yes	Yes	No	
2012	The Killers: Here with Me	No	Yes	No	Music video
2013	Sky Blue Collar	Yes	Yes	No	
2013	Captain Sparky vs. The Flying Saucers	No	No	Yes	Stop-motion
2014	Motel Providence	Yes	Yes	No	
2016	Green Lake	Yes	Yes	Yes	
2017	Kill the Engine	Yes	Yes	No	
2017	God Came 'Round	Yes	Yes	No	
2021	Awkward Endeavors	Yes	Yes	No	
2024	Viaticum	Yes	Yes	No	
2026	The Current State of the Backyard Pool Industry	Yes	Yes	No	
