= Heather Boyd =

American politician

Member of the Pennsylvania House of Representatives from the 163rd district
- Incumbent
- Assumed office June 5, 2023
- Preceded by: Michael Zabel

Member of the Upper Darby School District Board of Directors
- In office December 2015 – July 2018

Personal details
- Party: Democratic
- Education: University of Michigan (BA); James Madison University (MA); University of Delaware (MA)
- Website: Official Website

Heather Boyd is an American politician. A Democrat, she is a member of the Pennsylvania House of Representatives, representing the 163rd district.

== Biography ==
Boyd previously worked as a history and art history teacher at the high school and college level. Additionally, she worked as chief of staff to Pennsylvania State Representative Leanne Krueger and as district director and senior advisor to Congresswoman Mary Gay Scanlon.

Elected to the Upper Darby School Board, she served in that capacity from 2015 to 2018, and was then elected to the Pennsylvania House of Representatives, via a special election in 2023, to succeed Michael Zabel, who resigned on March 16, 2023, following a sexual harassment controversy.

Boyd's victory in the May 16, 2023 election maintained Democrats' one-seat majority in the Pennsylvania House.

== Pennsylvania House of Representatives ==
Heather Boyd was sworn in as a member of the Pennsylvania House of Representatives on June 5, 2023.

=== Committee assignments ===
Boyd sits on the following committees.

- Game & Fisheries
- Health
- Labor & Industry

== Electoral history ==
2023 Pennsylvania's 163rd House of Representatives district special election
Party	Candidate	Votes	%
Democratic	Heather Boyd	9,369	60.10
Republican	Kathleen Ford	6,028	38.67
Libertarian	Alfe Goodwin	193	1.24
Total votes		15,590	100.0
Democratic hold			
