= Marty Stern =

American athlete

Marty Stern (born December 11, 1936) is a 43-year championship track coach veteran. Marty started his track career as a hall of fame athlete at West Chester University in the mid-1950s. He began coaching several successful high school programs in the Philadelphia metropolitan area. After winning three Pennsylvania state championships, he was named head coach at Villanova University. While coaching at Villanova he led the women's cross country team to 5 Division 1 Team Championships. Marty was also a coach at the 1988 Olympics in Seoul, South Korea.

== Early life ==
Born in West Philadelphia on December 11, 1936, to accomplished saxophone player Sidney Stern and former USO performer Eleanor Sladko Stern. Marty is older brother to Robert Stern. Marty is a graduate and Wall of Fame member of Upper Darby High School.

Marty attended West Chester State University and graduated in 1959 with a B.S. in Health, Physical Education and Recreation. At WCU, he received 8 varsity letters for track, wrestling, and cross country.

== Coaching ==
=== Accomplishments ===
- 1989 NCAA Women's Cross-Country Division 1 Team Champions
- 1990 NCAA Women's Cross-Country Division 1 Team Champions
- 1991 NCAA Women's Cross-Country Division 1 Team Champions
- 1992 NCAA Women's Cross-Country Division 1 Team Champions
- 1993 NCAA Women's Cross-Country Division 1 Team Champions

=== Honors ===
- Stern was inducted into the USTFCCCA Coaches Hall of Fame as the Class of 2016.
- At the Philadelphia Sports Writers Association's 113th annual dinner in 2017, Stern was the recipient of a Special Achievement Award for his accomplishments.
