= Upper Darby School District =

School district in Pennsylvania

Coordinates: 39.929287°N 75.267935°W

Address
- 4611 Bond Avenue Drexel Hill, Pennsylvania, 19026-4592; United States

District information
- Type: Public school district
- Motto: Opportunity, Unity, Excellence

Students and staff
- District mascot: Royals
- Colors: Purple/Gold

Other information
- Website: www.upperdarbysd.org

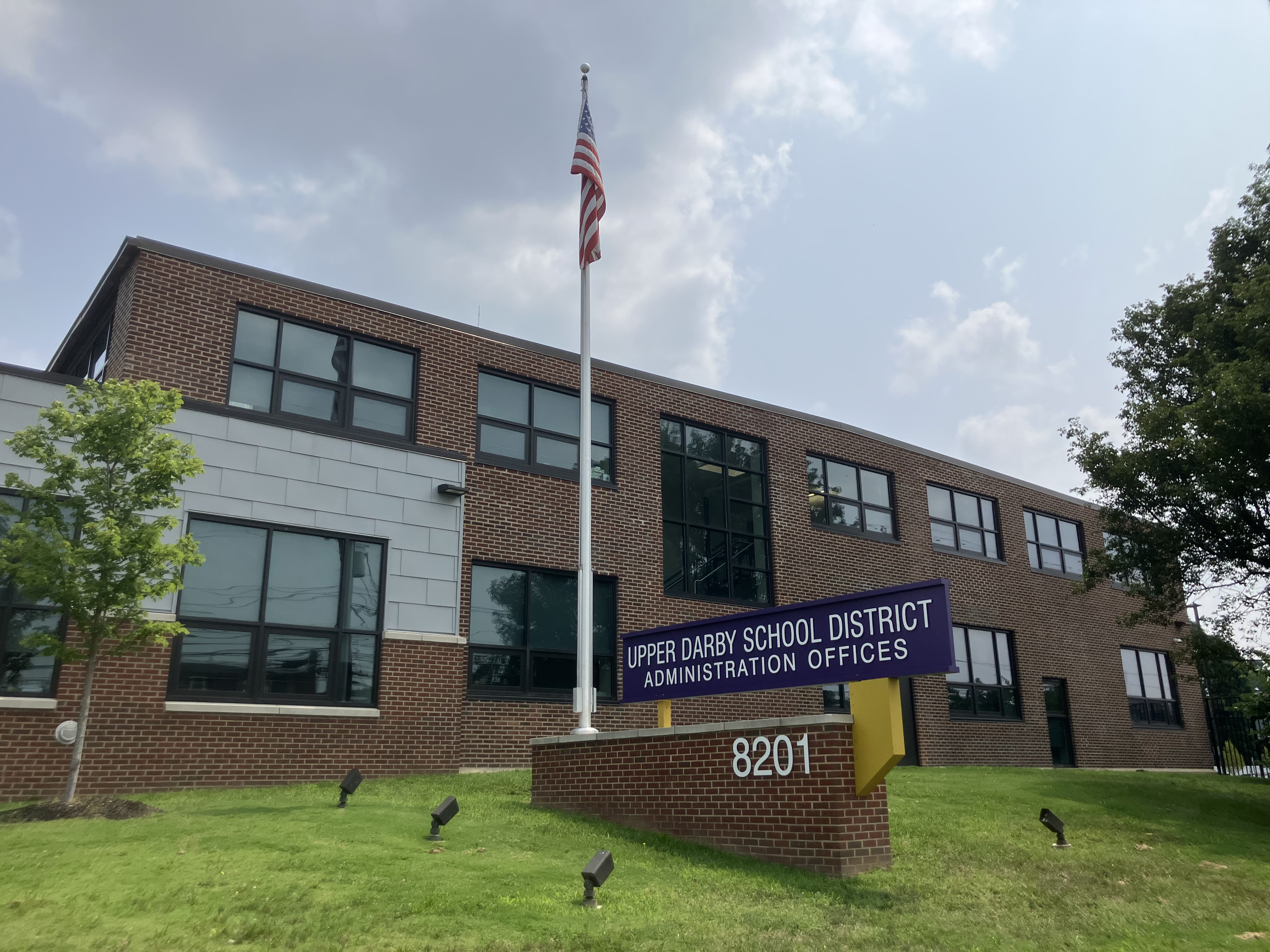
An image of the Upper Darby Administrative Offices/Headquarters in 2025

Upper Darby School District (UDSD) is a large public school district of approximately 12,000 students in Upper Darby Township, Delaware County, Pennsylvania. It consists of an 8.3-square-mile (21 km^{2}) area including Upper Darby Township, Clifton Heights borough, and Millbourne borough. According to 2009 local census data, it serves a resident population of 90,000. In 2009, the district residents’ per capita income was $20,699, while the median family income was $51,965. In the Commonwealth, the median family income was $49,501 and the United States median family income was $49,445, in 2010.

Upper Darby schools serve an increasingly diverse population: 41% of students are White, 42% are African American, 13% are Asian/Pacific Islander, 3% are Hispanic and 1% are other. In 2010, there are 877 Limited English Proficient (LEP) students speaking over 70 languages, including Punjabi, Vietnamese, Chinese, Korean, Albanian, Greek, and Urdu. Over 350 students also meet the state criteria for immigrant status. In addition, the district annually educates more than 380 students who have refugee status and/or limited formal schooling. In the past seven years, the percentage of students who meet the low-income status set by the Federal Free/Reduced Lunch Program has risen from 23% to almost 50%.

== Schools ==
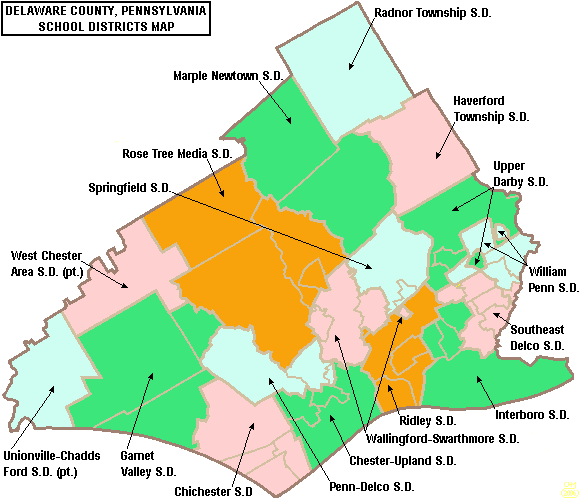
Upper Darby School District is in green in the northeastern part of the county

Upper Darby School District operates one high school, two middle schools, ten elementary schools, one kindergarten center, and a cyber academy.

=== High school ===
- Upper Darby High School (UDHS), Grades 9-12

=== Middle schools ===
- Beverly Hills Middle School (BHMS), Grades 6-8
- Clifton Heights Middle School (CHMS), Grades 6-8
- Drexel Hill Middle School (DHMS), Grades 6-8

=== Elementary schools ===
- Aronimink Elementary, Grades 1-5
- Bywood Elementary, Grades 1-5
- Garrettford Elementary, Grades 1-5
- Highland Park Elementary, Grades 1-5
- Hillcrest Elementary, Grades K-5
- Charles Kelly Elementary, Grades 1-5
  - The school property, previously used as the St. Charles School, is leased from the Roman Catholic Archdiocese of Philadelphia. It opened to allow the district more space to teach students.
- Primos Elementary, Grades K-5
- Stonehurst Hills Elementary, Grades 1-5
- Upper Darby Kindergarten Center, Grade K
- Westbrook Park Elementary, Grades K-5

== Extracurriculars ==
The district offers a variety of clubs, activities and sports.

=== Sports ===
The district is assigned to Pennsylvania Interscholastic Athletic Association (PIAA) District 1

The district funds the following sports for high school students:

Boys

- Baseball - AAAA
- Basketball - AAAA
- Cross Country - AAA
- Football - AAAA
- Golf - AAA
- Indoor Track and Field - AAAA
- Lacrosse - AAAA
- Soccer - AAA
- Swimming and Diving - AAA
- Tennis - AAA
- Track and Field - AAA
- Wrestling - AAA

Girls

- Basketball - AAAA
- Cheerleading - AAAA
- Cross Country - AAA
- Field Hockey - AAA
- Golf - AAA
- Indoor Track and Field - AAAA
- Lacrosse - AAAA
- Soccer (Fall) - AAA
- Softball - AAAA
- Swimming and Diving - AAA
- Tennis - AAA
- Track and Field - AAA
- Volleyball - AAA

- According to PIAA directory July 2012
