= Nicholas Micozzie =

American politician (1930–2020)

Member of the Pennsylvania House of Representatives from the 163rd district
- In office January 2, 1979 – 2014
- Preceded by: Joseph T. Doyle
- Succeeded by: James Santora

Personal details
- Born: September 7, 1930 Philadelphia, Pennsylvania
- Died: July 28, 2020 (aged 89)
- Party: Republican
- Education: St. Joseph's College, Villanova University
- Occupation: U.S. Air Force, retired

Nicholas Anthony Micozzie (September 7, 1930 – July 28, 2020) was an American politician who served as a Republican member of the Pennsylvania House of Representatives for the 163rd district from 1979 to 2014.

== Early life and education ==
The son of Camillo and Josephine (née Maffei) Micozzie, Nicholas Micozzie was born in Philadelphia, Pennsylvania and graduated from St. Thomas More High School. He obtained a B.S. in business administration from St. Joseph's College in 1963 and a degree in electrical engineering from Villanova University in 1968.

He served as staff sergeant in the United States Air Force from 1950 to 1954 during the Korean War.

== Career ==
Micozzie worked for General Electric and in real estate. He was elected commissioner in Upper Darby Township, Pennsylvania as a Democrat and served from 1971 to 1989. He switched to the Republican Party in 1978 and was elected to the Pennsylvania House of Representatives for the 163rd district. He was reelected to seventeen consecutive terms and served until 2014. He was not a candidate for reelection in 2014.

== Personal ==
Micozzie and his wife had three children, seven grandchildren, and five great-grandchildren. He was the father of former Upper Darby mayor Thomas Micozzie.

Micozzie died on July 28, 2020, following a fall on July 23, 2020.

== Legacy ==
A bridge on Garrett Road in Upper Darby Township, Pennsylvania was renamed the Honorable Nicholas A. Micozzie Bridge in his honor.
