= Mike Zabel =

American politician (born 1979)

Michael Zabel
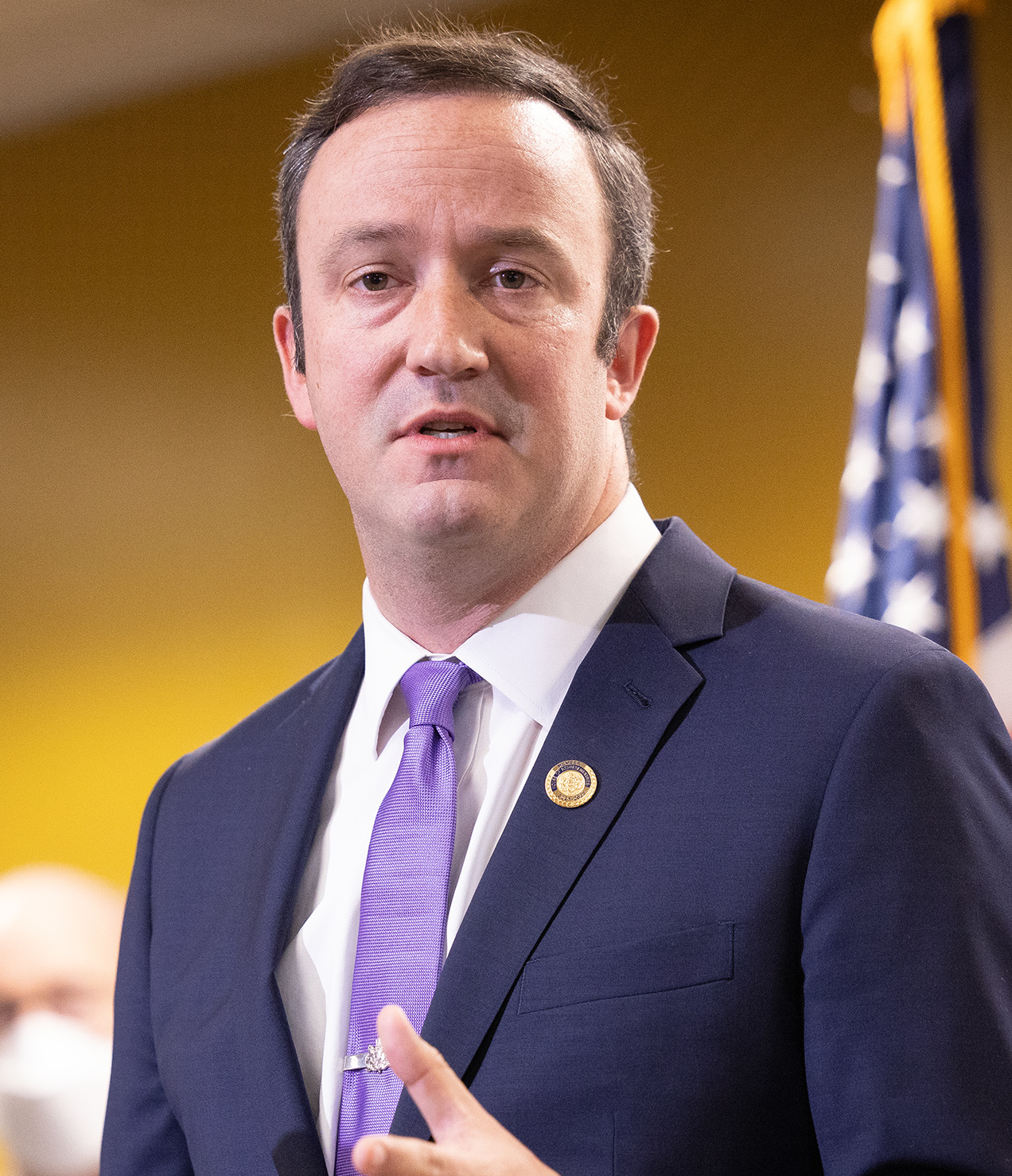
- Zabel in 2022

Member of the Pennsylvania House of Representatives from the 163rd district
- In office January 1, 2019 – March 16, 2023
- Preceded by: Jamie Santora
- Succeeded by: Heather Boyd

Personal details
- Born: January 16, 1979 (age 47) Delaware County, Pennsylvania, U.S.
- Party: Democratic
- Spouse: Lauren
- Children: 2
- Education: College of the Holy Cross (BA); University of Indiana (MA); Temple University (JD)

Michael Patrick Zabel (born January 16, 1979) is a former American politician. He served as a Democratic member of the Pennsylvania House of Representatives for the 163rd district from 2019 to 2023.

== Pennsylvania House of Representatives ==
In 2018, Zabel, a first-time candidate and former assistant district attorney in Philadelphia, defeated Republican incumbent Jamie Santora to represent the 163rd district in the Pennsylvania House of Representatives. Zabel's victory marked the first time a Democrat represented the seat in 40 years. He would be re-elected twice.

In March 2023, a union lobbyist's accusations of Zabel sexually harassing her in 2019 were made public. After the first accusation, two more allegations emerged against Zabel. Previously in 2018, Zabel's campaign manager accused him of inappropriately touching her. At the time, she reported it to an unnamed Democratic Party leader, but had not gone public. The same day the campaign manager's allegations were made public, State Representative Abby Major also said she was followed to her car by an intoxicated Zabel after rejecting his advances in November 2022. Zabel initially resisted calls to resign because of the allegations and said he would seek treatment. He later reversed his earlier statement and announced he would resign from office effective March 16, 2023.

== Sexual harassment claims ==
A state representative told Broad + Liberty about another incident at an event last fall where Zabel allegedly followed her to her car after complimenting her appearance and putting his arm around her. After she rebuffed him, Zabel tried to get another member to let him come to her hotel room, that House member said.

== Electoral history ==
2018 Pennsylvania House of Representatives election, District 163
Party	Candidate	Votes	%
Democratic	Mike Zabel	15,417	53.37
Republican	Jamie Santora (incumbent)	13,471	46.63
Total votes		28,888	100.00

2020 Pennsylvania House of Representatives election, District 163
Party	Candidate	Votes	%
Democratic	Mike Zabel (incumbent)	22,259	60.26
Republican	Michael McCollum	14,680	39.74
Total votes		36,939	100.00

2022 Pennsylvania House of Representatives election, District 163
Party	Candidate	Votes	%
Democratic	Mike Zabel (incumbent)	16,448	65.02
Republican	Kenneth P. Rucci	8,450	33.40
Libertarian	Alfe Goodwin	399	1.58
Total votes		25,297	100.00
