= 1998 Pennsylvania House of Representatives election =

- November 3, 1998

All 203 seats in the Pennsylvania House of Representatives 102 seats needed for a majority

	Majority party	Minority party
Leader	Matthew J. Ryan	Bill DeWeese
Party	Republican	Democratic
Leader since	January 3, 1995	January 3, 1995
Leader's seat	168th	50th
Last election	104	99
Seats after	103	100
Seat change	▼1	▲1
Popular vote	1,488,088	1,264,057
Percentage	53.74%	45.65%
Swing	▲4.42%	▼4.35%
- Democratic hold Democratic gain Republican hold Republican gain Republican: 50–60% 60–70% 70–80% 80–90% >90% Democratic: 50–60% 60–70% 70–80% 80–90% >90%
Speaker before election
Matthew J. Ryan
Republican
Elected Speaker
Matthew J. Ryan
Republican

The 1998 elections for the Pennsylvania House of Representatives were held on November 3, 1998, with all districts being decided. Primary elections were held on May 19, 1998. The term of office for those elected in 1998 began when the House of Representatives convened in January 1999. Pennsylvania State Representatives are elected for two-year terms, with all 203 seats up for election every two years.

Republicans maintained control over the chamber, winning 103 seats to the Democrats' 100 seats.

== Results summary ==
=== Retiring incumbents ===
==== Democrats ====
1. District 23: Ivan Itkin retired to run for governor.
2. District 34: Ronald Cowell retired.
3. District 48: Anthony Colaizzo retired.
4. District 69: William R. Lloyd Jr. retired to run for U.S. Senate.
5. District 135: Lisa Boscola retired to run for State Senate.
6. District 136: Joseph Corpora retired.

==== Republicans ====
1. District 12: Patricia Carone retired.
2. District 93: Mike Waugh retired to run for State Senate.
3. District 132: Charlie Dent retired to run for State Senate.
4. District 137: Leonard Gruppo retired to run for State Senate.
5. District 143: Joe Conti retired to run for State Senate.
6. District 146: Robert Reber retired.

=== Incumbents defeated in primary ===
==== Democrats ====
1. District 38: Richard Olasz lost renomination to Kenneth Ruffing.
2. District 119: Stanley Jarolin lost renomination to John Yudichak.

=== Other ===
==== Democrats ====
1. District 58: Herman Mihalich died on September 30, 1997.

==== Republicans ====
1. District 40: Albert Pettit died on June 7, 1997.

== Primary elections ==
=== Democratic primary ===
1998 Pennsylvania House of Representatives elections Democratic primary
District	Candidates	Votes	Percent
1	Linda Bebko-Jones	2,662	100.00
2	Italo Cappabianca	2,508	100.00
3	No candidate filed for party.		
4	Tom Scrimenti	1,574	100.00
5	No candidate filed for party.		
6	No candidate filed for party.		
7	Michael Gruitza	2,377	100.00
8	No candidate filed for party.		
9	Chris Sainato	2,902	100.00
10	Frank LaGrotta	2,321	100.00
11	Guy Travaglio	2,292	100.00
12	Tim Tuinstra	1,822	100.00
13	Ken Knickerbocker	589	100.00
14	Mike Veon	3,219	100.00
15	Nick Colafella	5,716	100.00
16	Susan Laughlin	4,702	100.00
17	No candidate filed for party.		
18	Peter R. Waitze	827	100.00
19	William Russell Robinson	3,560	70.86
19	Mark A. Brentley Sr.	1,464	29.14
20	Don Walko	6,428	100.00
21	Frank Pistella	6,074	100.00
22	Frank Gigliotti	7,300	100.00
23	Dan Frankel	6,511	77.69
23	Gene Sheck	1,870	22.31
24	Joseph Preston Jr.	3,755	57.67
24	Joe Jackson	2,756	42.33
25	Joseph Markosek	4,334	100.00
26	John Hamilton Jr.	716	100.00
27	Thomas C. Petrone	5,389	76.20
27	Michael Wattick	1,683	23.80
28	No candidate filed for party.		
29	David Mayernik	5,557	100.00
30	Thomas C. Sunday	4,618	100.00
31	No candidate filed for party.		
32	Anthony M. DeLuca	5,638	100.00
33	Frank Dermody	5,413	100.00
34	Paul Costa	2,841	39.05
34	Barbara Daly Danko	2,050	28.18
34	James Schlanger	1,270	17.46
34	Geraldine Homitz	796	10.94
34	Dai Morgan	318	4.37
35	Thomas Michlovic	5,051	69.79
35	Curt A. Visco	2,186	30.21
36	Harry Readshaw	7,335	100.00
37	No candidate filed for party.		
38	Kenneth Ruffing	5,404	52.51
38	Richard Olasz	4,888	47.49
39	David Levdansky	6,255	100.00
40	No candidate filed for party.		
41	Ralph Kaiser	6,014	100.00
42	Bob McMaster	4,415	100.00
43	No candidate filed for party.		
44	Tom Fullard	4,198	100.00
45	Fred Trello	7,712	100.00
46	Victor Lescovitz	3,633	100.00
47	Leo Trich	3,142	100.00
48	Tim Solobay	3,512	41.28
48	Tom Brown	2,221	26.11
48	Clemmy Allen	1,981	23.29
48	George Jack Henson	524	6.16
48	Joseph L. Corlazzoli	269	3.16
49	Peter Daley	4,636	100.00
50	Bill DeWeese	5,162	100.00
51	Lawrence Roberts	3,945	77.45
51	Michael J. Cavanagh	1,143	22.55
52	James Shaner	3,619	100.00
53	Albert C. Riech	686	100.00
54	Terry Van Horne	3,696	100.00
55	Joseph Petrarca Jr.	2,887	100.00
56	James Casorio	4,093	100.00
57	Thomas Tangretti	3,144	100.00
58	Ted Harhai	4,377	70.21
58	Ronald P. Stepinsky	1,857	29.79
59	George Trout	2,240	100.00
60	Timothy Pesci	2,968	100.00
61	Wendell W. Young IV	1,057	100.00
62	Sara Steelman	2,422	100.00
63	No candidate filed for party.		
64	Mark A. Flaherty	1,318	100.00
65	No candidate filed for party.		
66	No candidate filed for party.		
67	No candidate filed for party.		
68	No candidate filed for party.		
69	Karen M. Hugya	2,357	100.00
70	Netta Young Hughes	636	100.00
71	Edward P. Wojnaroski	3,720	100.00
72	Thomas F. Yewcic	4,310	74.74
72	Jim Peacock	1,457	25.26
73	Gary Haluska	4,626	100.00
74	Bud George	3,136	100.00
75	Dan A. Surra	3,004	100.00
76	Mike Hanna	2,617	100.00
77	No candidate filed for party.		
78	No candidate filed for party.		
79	No candidate filed for party.		
80	No candidate filed for party.		
81	No candidate filed for party.		
82	No candidate filed for party.		
83	No candidate filed for party.		
84	No candidate filed for party.		
85	No candidate filed for party.		
86	No candidate filed for party.		
87	No candidate filed for party.		
88	Louis U. Rice Jr.	1,660	100.00
89	Jeffrey Coy	991	100.00
90	No candidate filed for party.		
91	William J. Gilmartin	1,767	100.00
92	No candidate filed for party.		
93	Jeff Sanders	1,776	100.00
94	No candidate filed for party.		
95	Stephen Stetler	1,714	100.00
96	Mike Sturla	991	100.00
97	No candidate filed for party.		
98	George Leyh Jr.	589	100.00
99	No candidate filed for party.		
100	John F. Haser Jr.	372	100.00
101	No candidate filed for party.		
102	Charlie D. Anspach	833	100.00
103	Ron Buxton	1,620	100.00
104	No candidate filed for party.		
105	Jay Purdy	1,652	100.00
106	No candidate filed for party.		
107	Robert Belfanti	3,124	100.00
108	No candidate filed for party.		
109	John Gordner	2,477	100.00
110	No candidate filed for party.		
111	No candidate filed for party.		
112	Fred Belardi	3,901	100.00
113	Gaynor Cawley	4,612	100.00
114	Jim Wansacz	2,477	65.55
114	Mike Giannetta	1,302	34.45
115	Edward Staback	5,372	100.00
116	Todd Eachus	1,788	100.00
117	William H. Conyngham	1,639	100.00
118	Thomas Tigue	3,893	100.00
119	John Yudichak	4,473	50.73
119	Stanley Jarolin	3,681	41.75
119	Richard Kamus	663	7.52
120	Phyllis Mundy	2,208	100.00
121	Kevin Blaum	2,395	100.00
122	Keith R. McCall	2,556	100.00
123	Edward Lucyk	3,321	100.00
124	Victoria Lynn Kresge	1,234	100.00
125	John Strokelitus	1,362	100.00
126	Dante Santoni	3,287	100.00
127	Thomas Caltagirone	3,672	100.00
128	No candidate filed for party.		
129	No candidate filed for party.		
130	Joseph A. O'Keefe	886	71.28
130	Denton L. Schucker	357	28.72
131	Martha E. Falk	1,870	100.00
132	Jennifer Mann	1,941	67.91
132	Emma Tropiano	917	32.09
133	T. J. Rooney	2,241	100.00
134	Sheryl Hunt	1,484	100.00
135	Steve Samuelson	1,723	52.56
135	Wayne A. Grube	1,555	47.44
136	Robert L. Freeman	1,965	100.00
137	Richard Grucela	1,748	64.24
137	Alicia Miller	715	26.28
137	Jerry W. Geake	258	9.48
138	No candidate filed for party.		
139	No candidate filed for party.		
140	Thomas C. Corrigan	1,997	100.00
141	Anthony Melio	2,009	100.00
142	Richard P. Gennetti	1,190	100.00
143	Henry W. Rowan	1,166	100.00
144	No candidate filed for party.		
145	No candidate filed for party.		
146	Eileen McCaul	788	100.00
147	No candidate filed for party.		
148	Mary Jo Pauxtis	1,613	100.00
149	Constance H. Williams	1,483	100.00
150	No candidate filed for party.		
151	John J. Black Jr.	947	100.00
152	No candidate filed for party.		
153	No candidate filed for party.		
154	Lawrence Curry	2,436	100.00
155	No candidate filed for party.		
156	No candidate filed for party.		
157	John J. Jasienski Jr.	695	100.00
158	B. Kristin Hoover	658	100.00
159	Thaddeus Kirkland	867	100.00
160	Ed Kulesa	587	100.00
161	Nick Anastasio	780	100.00
162	Frank Hauser	646	100.00
163	Charlotte K. Hummel	811	100.00
164	No candidate filed for party.		
165	Eric Goldstein	816	100.00
166	Greg Vitali	1,500	100.00
167	No candidate filed for party.		
168	Randall L. Sampson	598	100.00
169	Jack Noonan	1,215	100.00
170	Francine G. Levin	1,463	100.00
171	No candidate filed for party.		
172	James Raynock Jr.	1,929	100.00
173	Michael McGeehan	2,653	100.00
174	Alan Butkovitz	3,831	100.00
175	Marie Lederer	2,417	100.00
176	Bill McKeown	2,094	100.00
177	George W. Still IV	1,101	100.00
178	No candidate filed for party.		
179	William Rieger	1,551	100.00
180	Benjamin Ramos	2,057	100.00
181	Curtis Thomas	3,433	100.00
182	Babette Josephs	3,863	100.00
183	Robert G. Klock	2,318	100.00
184	William F. Keller	4,260	100.00
185	Robert Donatucci	2,886	100.00
186	Harold James	3,432	100.00
187	Arlene Dabrow	1,377	100.00
188	James R. Roebuck Jr.	2,996	57.64
188	Thelma Peake	1,152	22.16
188	Rufus Lynch	1,050	20.20
189	Joseph Battisto	2,942	100.00
190	Michael Horsey	2,613	59.60
190	Ronald G. Johnson	1,563	35.65
190	Reggie Howard	208	4.74
191	Anthony H. Williams	2,053	100.00
192	Louise Bishop	4,185	100.00
193	No candidate filed for party.		
194	Kathy Manderino	2,829	100.00
195	Frank L. Oliver	3,263	65.39
195	Rodnie Jamison	1,727	34.61
196	Earl Max Downs	1,874	100.00
197	Andrew Carn	2,092	39.41
197	Anthony Clark	1,771	33.36
197	Ken Washington	768	14.47
197	Clinton Connor	677	12.75
198	Rosita Youngblood	3,958	78.58
198	Yvonne Thompson-Friend	1,079	21.42
199	Margaret Tricarico	1,312	100.00
200	LeAnna Washington	4,258	100.00
201	John L. Myers	3,424	100.00
202	Mark B. Cohen	3,373	100.00
203	Dwight Evans	3,773	74.86
203	Marvin A. Smith	1,267	25.14

=== Republican primary ===
1998 Pennsylvania House of Representatives elections Republican primary
District	Candidates	Votes	Percent
1	Christopher W. Beyer	852	100.00
2	Anthony Scarpelli	1,165	100.00
3	Karl Boyes	2,552	100.00
4	Michael Leyda	1,609	100.00
5	R. Tracy Seyfert	3,073	72.27
5	Clifford Kip Allen	1,179	27.73
6	Teresa Forcier	2,251	100.00
7	James D. Lumpp	989	100.00
8	Howard Fargo	2,453	100.00
9	No candidate filed for party.		
10	Dennis Neese	1,293	50.73
10	James F. Peters	1,256	49.27
11	Larry A. Thompson	2,417	100.00
12	Daryl Metcalfe	2,906	63.24
12	Mark Burd	1,689	36.76
13	Arthur D. Hershey	1,754	100.00
14	Matthew Heidorn	1,402	100.00
15	Janet A. Jackson	2,244	100.00
16	Jim Rooker	1,791	100.00
17	Rod Wilt	2,457	100.00
18	Gene DiGirolamo	2,811	100.00
19	Larry Shannon	395	100.00
20	No candidate filed for party.		
21	No candidate filed for party.		
22	Tim Reitmeyer	926	100.00
23	No candidate filed for party.		
24	No candidate filed for party.		
25	No candidate filed for party.		
26	Tim Hennessey	1,927	100.00
27	Terri L. Kuhn	1,755	100.00
28	Jane Orie	4,954	70.19
28	Douglas P. Yauger	2,104	29.81
29	John A. Mazzie	3,599	100.00
30	Jeff Habay	4,720	78.13
30	Dan Anderson	1,321	21.87
31	David J. Steil	3,478	100.00
32	No candidate filed for party.		
33	Jonathan B. Skedel	2,448	100.00
34	Regis F. Griffin	1,428	41.79
34	Gary J. English	996	29.15
34	Hart Hillman	993	29.06
35	No candidate filed for party.		
36	No candidate filed for party.		
37	Katie True	3,109	85.02
37	Terry P. Leslie	548	14.98
38	Tina M. Prestas	1,192	100.00
39	Gregory J. Ribovich	2,114	100.00
40	John A. Maher	4,765	79.35
40	John Schnatterly	1,240	20.65
41	No candidate filed for party.		
42	Thomas L. Stevenson	5,298	100.00
43	Jere Schuler	2,556	100.00
44	John R. Pippy	2,327	100.00
45	No candidate filed for party.		
46	Ronald David Glassman	1,374	100.00
47	William Haynes	1,379	100.00
48	William A. Bautz	818	57.24
48	Demo Agoris	611	42.76
49	No candidate filed for party.		
50	No candidate filed for party.		
51	No candidate filed for party.		
52	No candidate filed for party.		
53	Robert Godshall	3,644	100.00
54	Tom Klebine	1,219	100.00
55	No candidate filed for party.		
56	Lawrence M. Wojcik Jr.	1,752	100.00
57	John W. Bush Sr.	971	61.93
57	Joseph R. Kostelnik	597	38.07
58	Shaun Bannon	891	100.00
59	Jess M. Stairs	2,138	100.00
60	Samuel F. Sulkosky	2,015	100.00
61	Joseph Gladeck	5,118	100.00
62	David S. Frick	2,287	59.23
62	Rich Gallo	1,574	40.77
63	Fred McIlhattan	2,698	100.00
64	Scott Hutchinson	2,687	100.00
65	Jim Lynch	2,151	100.00
66	Samuel H. Smith	2,585	100.00
67	Kenneth Jadlowiec	2,487	100.00
68	Matt E. Baker	4,786	100.00
69	Bob Bastian	3,176	100.00
70	John Fichter	3,001	100.00
71	Paul Litwalk	2,070	100.00
72	Frank Alt	2,113	100.00
73	No candidate filed for party.		
74	No candidate filed for party.		
75	No candidate filed for party.		
76	Glenn Thompson	3,178	100.00
77	Lynn Herman	3,473	100.00
78	Dick Hess	3,391	100.00
79	Richard Geist	2,655	100.00
80	Jerry Stern	3,195	100.00
81	Larry Sather	3,245	100.00
82	Daniel F. Clark	4,216	100.00
83	Thomas W. Dempsey	2,982	100.00
84	Brett Feese	3,271	100.00
85	Russ Fairchild	3,043	100.00
86	Allan Egolf	3,635	100.00
87	Pat Vance	5,775	100.00
88	Jerry L. Nailor	6,990	100.00
89	Bob Thomas	1,907	100.00
90	Patrick Fleagle	1,577	100.00
91	Stephen Maitland	4,732	100.00
92	Bruce I. Smith	3,885	64.83
92	Michael J. Wilson	2,108	35.17
93	Ron Miller	2,471	41.11
93	Barbara Raver Metzler	2,392	39.79
93	Joyce E. Keesey	1,148	19.10
94	Stan Saylor	4,956	100.00
95	Daniel M. Leese	1,779	100.00
96	David M. Schwanger	1,067	100.00
97	Jere Strittmatter	3,100	100.00
98	Thomas E. Armstrong	2,375	100.00
99	Leroy M. Zimmerman	2,074	100.00
100	John E. Barley	2,243	100.00
101	Edward H. Krebs	3,371	57.63
101	Bruce K. Golgowski	2,478	42.37
102	Peter Zug	3,114	100.00
103	No candidate filed for party.		
104	Mark S. McNaughton	5,048	61.09
104	Sally Klein	1,755	21.24
104	Matt Napiltonia	1,460	17.67
105	Ron Marsico	5,366	100.00
106	Frank Tulli	4,086	100.00
107	No candidate filed for party.		
108	Merle Phillips	2,729	100.00
109	Conrad S. Gosciminski Sr.	1,605	100.00
110	J. Scot Chadwick	5,961	100.00
111	Sandra Major	8,392	100.00
112	No candidate filed for party.		
113	No candidate filed for party.		
114	Frank Serafini	3,692	100.00
115	No candidate filed for party.		
116	John P. Rodgers	1,268	100.00
117	George Hasay	2,380	100.00
118	No candidate filed for party.		
119	Jean Sepling	1,211	100.00
120	William Bill James	2,143	100.00
121	Stephen J. Urban	816	100.00
122	No candidate filed for party.		
123	Clyde Champ Holman	2,716	100.00
124	Dave Argall	2,754	100.00
125	Bob Allen	2,521	100.00
126	John Fielding	1,517	100.00
127	Gregory P. Garwood	1,083	100.00
128	Sam Rohrer	2,365	66.47
128	Bruce Mangione	1,193	33.53
129	Sheila Miller	1,997	100.00
130	Dennis Leh	1,350	100.00
131	Pat Browne	1,566	100.00
132	David K. Bausch	1,680	48.84
132	Terry Spinosa	911	26.48
132	Rima J. Fahl	849	24.68
133	Joseph T. Heber	1,439	100.00
134	Donald Snyder	4,061	100.00
135	Mark S. Mitman	2,035	100.00
136	Brian Monahan	1,141	100.00
137	Brian Prest	1,263	36.02
137	Jim Mazza	1,218	34.74
137	Ron Angle	1,025	29.24
138	Craig Dally	2,441	100.00
139	Jerry Birmelin	5,204	100.00
140	No candidate filed for party.		
141	John R. Petras	1,062	100.00
142	Matthew N. Wright	2,371	100.00
143	Chuck McIlhinney	2,865	41.33
143	Bill Lyle	1,547	22.32
143	Maris C. Langford	1,538	22.19
143	Richard K. Gaver	982	14.17
144	Thomas W. Druce	3,411	100.00
145	Paul Clymer	2,905	100.00
146	Mary Ann Dailey	1,269	34.09
146	Diane DeLong	1,265	33.98
146	Thomas J. Quigley	620	16.65
146	Dan Weand	569	15.28
147	Raymond Bunt	3,898	100.00
148	Lita Indzel Cohen	3,978	100.00
149	Mary Wright	2,568	66.93
149	Angelo Faragalli	1,269	33.07
150	John A. Lawless	3,502	100.00
151	Eugene McGill	4,143	100.00
152	Roy Cornell	4,248	100.00
153	Ellen Bard	4,656	100.00
154	Mary Amonitti	3,092	100.00
155	Curt Schroder	2,471	100.00
156	Elinor Z. Taylor	3,089	100.00
157	Carole A. Rubley	2,670	100.00
158	L. Chris Ross	2,752	100.00
159	James L. Johnson	1,807	100.00
160	Stephen Barrar	4,323	100.00
161	Tom Gannon	3,480	100.00
162	Ronald C. Raymond	3,326	100.00
163	Nicholas Micozzie	3,158	100.00
164	Mario Civera	3,487	100.00
165	Bill Adolph	4,593	100.00
166	Joseph F. Kelly	2,988	100.00
167	Bob Flick	2,896	100.00
168	Matthew J. Ryan	3,629	100.00
169	Dennis M. O'Brien	2,436	100.00
170	George T. Kenney	1,558	100.00
171	Kerry Benninghoff	5,662	100.00
172	John Perzel	1,629	100.00
173	No candidate filed for party.		
174	No candidate filed for party.		
175	Anthony N. Radocaj	717	100.00
176	Christopher Wogan	1,983	100.00
177	John J. Taylor	1,043	100.00
178	Roy Reinard	3,190	100.00
179	Ronald J. Heater	159	100.00
180	Nestor Gonzalez	183	100.00
181	No candidate filed for party.		
182	No candidate filed for party.		
183	Julie Harhart	1,987	100.00
184	Gina Andrew	525	100.00
185	Anthony Giordano	697	100.00
186	Charles Reeves	211	100.00
187	Paul Semmel	2,570	70.72
187	Todd R. Gummo	1,064	29.28
188	Barbara L. Jacobs	99	100.00
189	No candidate filed for party.		
190	Maureen M. Davis	141	100.00
191	Robert J. Johns	292	100.00
192	Vincent D. Gordon	240	100.00
193	Steven R. Nickol	4,467	100.00
194	Patsy Taylor	640	100.00
195	Marie P. Bradley	255	100.00
196	Todd Platts	5,071	100.00
197	Edward P. Bevans	154	100.00
198	No candidate filed for party.		
199	Albert Masland	5,048	100.00
200	No candidate filed for party.		
201	Joseph Louis Messa	108	100.00
202	No candidate filed for party.		
203	John Paul Mugford	143	100.00

== General election ==
=== Overview ===
Statewide outlook
Affiliation	Candidates	Votes	Vote %	Seats won
Republican	169	1,488,088	53.74	103
Democratic	149	1,264,057	45.65	100
Libertarian	11	9,024	0.33	0
Gaines for Change	1	2,920	0.11	0
Beyond 2000	1	1,223	0.04	0
Constitution	2	1,184	0.04	0
Independent	2	1,119	0.04	0
Green	1	400	0.01	0
Reform	1	376	0.01	0
Veronica Frazier Party	1	267	0.01	0
We the People	1	173	0.01	0
Total	339	2,768,831	100.00	203

=== Close races ===
Districts where the margin of victory was under 10%:

1. District 114, 1.0%
2. District 137, 1.0% (gain)
3. District 143, 1.3%
4. District 135, 3.2%
5. District 123, 4.8%
6. District 159, 5.3%
7. District 132, 5.4% (gain)
8. District 183, 5.7%

=== District breakdown ===
District	Party	Incumbent	Status	Party	Candidate	Votes	%
1	Democratic	Linda Bebko-Jones	Re-elected	Democratic	Linda Bebko-Jones	9,781	76.70
1	Democratic	Linda Bebko-Jones	Re-elected	Republican	Christopher W. Beyer	2,972	23.30
2	Democratic	Italo Cappabianca	Re-elected	Democratic	Italo Cappabianca	10,052	69.93
2	Democratic	Italo Cappabianca	Re-elected	Republican	Anthony Scarpelli	4,322	30.07
3	Republican	Karl Boyes	Re-elected	Republican	Karl Boyes	16,181	100.00
4	Democratic	Tom Scrimenti	Re-elected	Democratic	Tom Scrimenti	11,885	72.86
4	Democratic	Tom Scrimenti	Re-elected	Republican	Michael Leyda	4,426	27.14
5	Republican	R. Tracy Seyfert	Re-elected (Note: Cross-endorsed by the Democratic Party.)	Republican	R. Tracy Seyfert	14,961	100.00
6	Republican	Teresa Forcier	Re-elected	Republican	Teresa Forcier	10,282	100.00
7	Democratic	Michael Gruitza	Re-elected	Democratic	Michael Gruitza	9,709	66.40
7	Democratic	Michael Gruitza	Re-elected	Republican	James D. Lumpp	4,914	33.60
8	Republican	Howard Fargo	Re-elected	Republican	Howard Fargo	10,718	100.00
9	Democratic	Chris Sainato	Re-elected (Note: Cross-endorsed by the Republican Party.)	Democratic	Chris Sainato	14,568	100.00
10	Democratic	Frank LaGrotta	Re-elected	Democratic	Frank LaGrotta	11,310	69.36
10	Democratic	Frank LaGrotta	Re-elected	Republican	Dennis Neese	4,997	30.64
11	Democratic	Guy Travaglio	Re-elected	Democratic	Guy Travaglio	10,408	66.56
11	Democratic	Guy Travaglio	Re-elected	Republican	Larry A. Thompson	5,229	33.44
12	Republican	Patricia Carone	Retired	Republican	Daryl Metcalfe	12,382	63.97
12	Republican	Patricia Carone	Retired	Democratic	Tim Tuinstra	6,973	36.03
13	Republican	Arthur D. Hershey	Re-elected	Republican	Arthur D. Hershey	8,795	72.07
13	Republican	Arthur D. Hershey	Re-elected	Democratic	Ken Knickerbocker	3,409	27.93
14	Democratic	Mike Veon	Re-elected	Democratic	Mike Veon	10,082	72.62
14	Democratic	Mike Veon	Re-elected	Republican	Matthew Heidorn	3,801	27.38
15	Democratic	Nick Colafella	Re-elected	Democratic	Nick Colafella	12,214	68.51
15	Democratic	Nick Colafella	Re-elected	Republican	Janet A. Jackson	4,814	27.00
15	Democratic	Nick Colafella	Re-elected	Constitution	Gordon Johnston	801	4.49
16	Democratic	Susan Laughlin	Re-elected	Democratic	Susan Laughlin	10,839	65.26
16	Democratic	Susan Laughlin	Re-elected	Republican	Jim Rooker	5,770	34.74
17	Republican	Rod Wilt	Re-elected	Republican	Rod Wilt	11,118	100.00
18	Republican	Gene DiGirolamo	Re-elected	Republican	Gene DiGirolamo	9,122	72.69
18	Republican	Gene DiGirolamo	Re-elected	Democratic	Peter R. Waitze	3,427	27.31
19	Democratic	William Russell Robinson	Re-elected	Democratic	William Russell Robinson	7,897	87.87
19	Democratic	William Russell Robinson	Re-elected	Republican	Larry Shannon	1,090	12.13
20	Democratic	Don Walko	Re-elected	Democratic	Don Walko	9,235	93.41
20	Democratic	Don Walko	Re-elected	Libertarian	Charles Stutler	651	6.59
21	Democratic	Frank Pistella	Re-elected	Democratic	Frank Pistella	9,702	100.00
22	Democratic	Frank Gigliotti	Re-elected	Democratic	Frank Gigliotti	9,368	70.29
22	Democratic	Frank Gigliotti	Re-elected	Republican	Tim Reitmeyer	3,959	29.71
23	Democratic	Ivan Itkin	Retired to run for Governor	Democratic	Dan Frankel	11,117	100.00
24	Democratic	Joseph Preston Jr.	Re-elected	Democratic	Joseph Preston Jr.	7,898	71.86
24	Democratic	Joseph Preston Jr.	Re-elected	Gaines for Change	Nicole Primas Gaines	2,920	26.57
24	Democratic	Joseph Preston Jr.	Re-elected	We the People	Duane R. Wright	173	1.57
25	Democratic	Joseph Markosek	Re-elected	Democratic	Joseph Markosek	12,015	100.00
26	Republican	Tim Hennessey	Re-elected	Republican	Tim Hennessey	7,956	64.71
26	Republican	Tim Hennessey	Re-elected	Democratic	J. Hank Hamilton	4,338	35.29
27	Democratic	Thomas C. Petrone	Re-elected	Democratic	Thomas C. Petrone	9,179	64.56
27	Democratic	Thomas C. Petrone	Re-elected	Republican	Terri L. Kuhn	4,656	32.75
27	Democratic	Thomas C. Petrone	Re-elected	Constitution	Frank Liberatore	383	2.69
28	Republican	Jane Orie	Re-elected	Republican	Jane Orie	16,619	100.00
29	Democratic	David Mayernik	Re-elected	Democratic	David Mayernik	12,545	71.62
29	Democratic	David Mayernik	Re-elected	Republican	John A. Mazzie	4,970	28.38
30	Republican	Jeff Habay	Re-elected	Republican	Jeff Habay	14,883	75.11
30	Republican	Jeff Habay	Re-elected	Democratic	Thomas C. Sunday	4,932	24.89
31	Republican	David J. Steil	Re-elected	Republican	David J. Steil	14,766	100.00
32	Democratic	Tony DeLuca	Re-elected	Democratic	Tony DeLuca	12,576	100.00
33	Democratic	Frank Dermody	Re-elected	Democratic	Frank Dermody	10,943	68.02
33	Democratic	Frank Dermody	Re-elected	Republican	David J. Schramm	5,145	31.98
34	Democratic	Ronald Cowell	Retired	Democratic	Paul Costa	10,532	63.64
34	Democratic	Ronald Cowell	Retired	Republican	Regis F. Griffin	6,018	36.36
35	Democratic	Thomas Michlovic	Re-elected	Democratic	Thomas Michlovic	8,398	87.29
35	Democratic	Thomas Michlovic	Re-elected	Beyond 2000	Robert Clanagan	1,223	12.71
36	Democratic	Harry Readshaw	Re-elected	Democratic	Harry Readshaw	11,873	100.00
37	Republican	Katie True	Re-elected	Republican	Katie True	13,019	100.00
38	Democratic	Richard Olasz	Defeated in primary	Democratic	Kenneth Ruffing	9,832	64.30
38	Democratic	Richard Olasz	Defeated in primary	Republican	Tina M. Prestas	5,458	35.70
39	Democratic	David Levdansky	Re-elected	Democratic	David Levdansky	9,920	63.62
39	Democratic	David Levdansky	Re-elected	Republican	Gregory J. Ribovich	5,672	36.38
40	Republican	Albert Pettit	Died	Republican	John A. Maher	17,019	100.00
41	Democratic	Ralph Kaiser	Re-elected	Democratic	Ralph Kaiser	16,139	100.00
42	Republican	Thomas L. Stevenson	Re-elected	Republican	Thomas L. Stevenson	11,860	59.64
42	Republican	Thomas L. Stevenson	Re-elected	Democratic	Jodi Rita Hakim	7,625	38.35
42	Republican	Thomas L. Stevenson	Re-elected	Green	Larry Zalewski	400	2.01
43	Republican	Jere Schuler	Re-elected	Republican	Jere Schuler	11,445	100.00
44	Republican	John Pippy	Re-elected	Republican	John Pippy	10,216	61.96
44	Republican	John Pippy	Re-elected	Democratic	Tom Fullard	6,273	38.04
45	Democratic	Fred Trello	Re-elected	Democratic	Fred Trello	11,789	100.00
46	Democratic	Victor Lescovitz	Re-elected	Democratic	Victor Lescovitz	10,260	69.78
46	Democratic	Victor Lescovitz	Re-elected	Republican	Ronald David Glassman	4,444	30.22
47	Democratic	Leo Trich	Re-elected	Democratic	Leo Trich	8,621	70.80
47	Democratic	Leo Trich	Re-elected	Republican	William Haynes	3,556	29.20
48	Democratic	Anthony Colaizzo	Retired	Democratic	Tim Solobay	11,341	73.09
48	Democratic	Anthony Colaizzo	Retired	Republican	William A. Bautz	4,175	26.91
49	Democratic	Peter Daley	Re-elected	Democratic	Peter Daley	11,265	100.00
50	Democratic	Bill DeWeese	Re-elected	Democratic	Bill DeWeese	10,851	100.00
51	Democratic	Lawrence Roberts	Re-elected	Democratic	Lawrence Roberts	10,641	100.00
52	Democratic	James Shaner	Re-elected	Democratic	James Shaner	9,120	100.00
53	Republican	Robert Godshall	Re-elected	Republican	Robert Godshall	11,072	74.58
53	Republican	Robert Godshall	Re-elected	Democratic	Albert C. Riech	3,774	25.42
54	Democratic	Terry Van Horne	Re-elected	Democratic	Terry Van Horne	9,681	62.69
54	Democratic	Terry Van Horne	Re-elected	Republican	Tom Klebine	5,762	37.31
55	Democratic	Joseph Petrarca Jr.	Re-elected	Democratic	Joseph Petrarca Jr.	10,488	100.00
56	Democratic	James Casorio	Re-elected	Democratic	James Casorio	10,887	59.84
56	Democratic	James Casorio	Re-elected	Republican	Lawrence M. Wojcik Jr.	7,306	40.16
57	Democratic	Thomas Tangretti	Re-elected	Democratic	Thomas Tangretti	9,669	66.39
57	Democratic	Thomas Tangretti	Re-elected	Republican	John W. Bush Sr.	4,895	33.61
58	Democratic	Herman Mihalich	Died	Democratic	Ted Harhai	10,627	73.01
58	Democratic	Herman Mihalich	Died	Republican	Shaun Bannon	3,928	26.99
59	Republican	Jess M. Stairs	Re-elected	Republican	Jess M. Stairs	12,083	72.24
59	Republican	Jess M. Stairs	Re-elected	Democratic	George Trout	4,643	27.76
60	Democratic	Timothy Pesci	Re-elected	Democratic	Timothy Pesci	10,213	66.75
60	Democratic	Timothy Pesci	Re-elected	Republican	Samuel F. Sulkosky	5,087	33.25
61	Republican	Joseph Gladeck	Re-elected	Republican	Joseph Gladeck	13,399	62.39
61	Republican	Joseph Gladeck	Re-elected	Democratic	Wendell W. Young IV	8,077	37.61
62	Democratic	Sara Steelman	Re-elected	Democratic	Sara Steelman	9,114	58.55
62	Democratic	Sara Steelman	Re-elected	Republican	David S. Frick	6,451	41.45
63	Republican	Fred McIlhattan	Re-elected	Republican	Fred McIlhattan	13,002	89.31
63	Republican	Fred McIlhattan	Re-elected	Libertarian	Vernon L. Etzel	1,556	10.69
64	Republican	Scott Hutchinson	Re-elected	Republican	Scott Hutchinson	9,269	60.33
64	Republican	Scott Hutchinson	Re-elected	Democratic	Mark A. Flaherty	6,095	39.67
65	Republican	Jim Lynch	Re-elected	Republican	Jim Lynch	11,618	100.00
66	Republican	Samuel H. Smith	Re-elected	Republican	Samuel H. Smith	10,961	100.00
67	Republican	Kenneth Jadlowiec	Re-elected	Republican	Kenneth Jadlowiec	11,010	100.00
68	Republican	Matt E. Baker	Re-elected	Republican	Matt E. Baker	14,407	100.00
69	Democratic	William R. Lloyd Jr.	Retired to run for U.S. Senate	Republican	Bob Bastian	11,311	62.29
69	Democratic	William R. Lloyd Jr.	Retired to run for U.S. Senate	Democratic	Karen M. Hugya	6,849	37.71
70	Republican	John Fichter	Re-elected	Republican	John Fichter	7,938	59.68
70	Republican	John Fichter	Re-elected	Democratic	Netta Young Hughes	5,363	40.32
71	Democratic	Edward P. Wojnaroski	Re-elected	Democratic	Edward P. Wojnaroski	11,476	68.30
71	Democratic	Edward P. Wojnaroski	Re-elected	Republican	Paul Litwalk	5,032	29.95
71	Democratic	Edward P. Wojnaroski	Re-elected	Libertarian	Stanley Long	294	1.75
72	Democratic	Thomas F. Yewcic	Re-elected	Democratic	Thomas F. Yewcic	13,740	77.40
72	Democratic	Thomas F. Yewcic	Re-elected	Republican	Frank Alt	3,678	20.72
72	Democratic	Thomas F. Yewcic	Re-elected	Libertarian	Valjean G. Clark	335	1.89
73	Democratic	Gary Haluska	Re-elected	Democratic	Gary Haluska	12,273	100.00
74	Democratic	Bud George	Re-elected	Democratic	Bud George	14,312	100.00
75	Democratic	Dan A. Surra	Re-elected	Democratic	Dan A. Surra	14,672	100.00
76	Democratic	Mike Hanna	Re-elected	Democratic	Mike Hanna	9,180	60.77
76	Democratic	Mike Hanna	Re-elected	Republican	Glenn Thompson	5,927	39.23
77	Republican	Lynn Herman	Re-elected	Republican	Lynn Herman	8,806	100.00
78	Republican	Dick Hess	Re-elected	Republican	Dick Hess	14,222	100.00
79	Republican	Richard Geist	Re-elected	Republican	Richard Geist	10,794	100.00
80	Republican	Jerry Stern	Re-elected	Republican	Jerry Stern	11,863	100.00
81	Republican	Larry Sather	Re-elected	Republican	Larry Sather	10,932	100.00
82	Republican	Daniel F. Clark	Re-elected	Republican	Daniel F. Clark	10,885	100.00
83	Republican	Thomas W. Dempsey	Re-elected	Republican	Thomas W. Dempsey	9,935	100.00
84	Republican	Brett Feese	Re-elected	Republican	Brett Feese	11,733	100.00
85	Republican	Russ Fairchild	Re-elected	Republican	Russ Fairchild	10,013	100.00
86	Republican	Allan Egolf	Re-elected	Republican	Allan Egolf	11,351	100.00
87	Republican	Pat Vance	Re-elected	Republican	Pat Vance	15,281	100.00
88	Republican	Jerry L. Nailor	Re-elected	Republican	Jerry L. Nailor	13,818	79.70
88	Republican	Jerry L. Nailor	Re-elected	Democratic	Louis U. Rice Jr.	3,520	20.30
89	Democratic	Jeffrey Coy	Re-elected	Democratic	Jeffrey Coy	9,869	56.27
89	Democratic	Jeffrey Coy	Re-elected	Republican	Bob Thomas	7,670	43.73
90	Republican	Patrick Fleagle	Re-elected	Republican	Patrick Fleagle	11,387	100.00
91	Republican	Stephen Maitland	Re-elected	Republican	Stephen Maitland	11,075	70.98
91	Republican	Stephen Maitland	Re-elected	Democratic	William J. Gilmartin	4,529	29.02
92	Republican	Bruce I. Smith	Re-elected	Republican	Bruce I. Smith	11,834	92.38
92	Republican	Bruce I. Smith	Re-elected	Independent	Marlin D. Cutshall	976	7.62
93	Republican	Mike Waugh	Retired to run for State Senate	Republican	Ron Miller	11,950	71.74
93	Republican	Mike Waugh	Retired to run for State Senate	Democratic	Jeff Sanders	4,707	28.26
94	Republican	Stan Saylor	Re-elected	Republican	Stan Saylor	12,100	100.00
95	Democratic	Stephen Stetler	Re-elected	Democratic	Stephen Stetler	6,384	60.95
95	Democratic	Stephen Stetler	Re-elected	Republican	Daniel M. Leese	4,091	39.05
96	Democratic	Mike Sturla	Re-elected	Democratic	Mike Sturla	5,396	57.24
96	Democratic	Mike Sturla	Re-elected	Republican	David M. Schwanger	4,031	42.76
97	Republican	Jere Strittmatter	Re-elected	Republican	Jere Strittmatter	14,573	100.00
98	Republican	Thomas E. Armstrong	Re-elected	Republican	Thomas E. Armstrong	9,077	68.27
98	Republican	Thomas E. Armstrong	Re-elected	Democratic	George Leyh	4,218	31.73
99	Republican	Leroy M. Zimmerman	Re-elected	Republican	Leroy M. Zimmerman	10,544	100.00
100	Republican	John E. Barley	Re-elected	Republican	John E. Barley	9,862	76.53
100	Republican	John E. Barley	Re-elected	Democratic	John F. Haser Jr.	3,024	23.47
101	Republican	Edward H. Krebs	Re-elected	Republican	Edward H. Krebs	10,771	100.00
102	Republican	Peter Zug	Re-elected	Republican	Peter Zug	10,048	71.84
102	Republican	Peter Zug	Re-elected	Democratic	Charlie D. Anspach	3,939	28.16
103	Democratic	Ron Buxton	Re-elected	Democratic	Ron Buxton	8,544	100.00
104	Republican	Mark S. McNaughton	Re-elected	Republican	Mark S. McNaughton	15,185	100.00
105	Republican	Ron Marsico	Re-elected	Republican	Ron Marsico	13,155	68.07
105	Republican	Ron Marsico	Re-elected	Democratic	Jay Purdy	6,171	31.93
106	Republican	Frank Tulli	Re-elected	Republican	Frank Tulli	13,804	100.00
107	Democratic	Robert Belfanti	Re-elected	Democratic	Robert Belfanti	10,958	100.00
108	Republican	Merle Phillips	Re-elected	Republican	Merle Phillips	7,564	100.00
109	Democratic	John Gordner	Re-elected	Democratic	John Gordner	10,130	75.65
109	Democratic	John Gordner	Re-elected	Republican	Conrad S. Gosciminski Sr.	3,261	24.35
110	Republican	J. Scot Chadwick	Re-elected	Republican	J. Scot Chadwick	14,266	100.00
111	Republican	Sandra Major	Re-elected	Republican	Sandra Major	17,123	100.00
112	Democratic	Fred Belardi	Re-elected	Democratic	Fred Belardi	12,521	100.00
113	Democratic	Gaynor Cawley	Re-elected	Democratic	Gaynor Cawley	13,375	100.00
114	Republican	Frank Serafini	Re-elected	Republican	Frank Serafini	10,715	50.49
114	Republican	Frank Serafini	Re-elected	Democratic	Jim Wansacz	10,508	49.51
115	Democratic	Edward Staback	Re-elected	Democratic	Edward Staback	15,696	97.66
115	Democratic	Edward Staback	Re-elected	Reform	Ronald T. Hannivig	376	2.34
116	Democratic	Todd Eachus	Re-elected	Democratic	Todd Eachus	8,433	66.33
116	Democratic	Todd Eachus	Re-elected	Republican	John P. Rodgers	4,280	33.67
117	Republican	George Hasay	Re-elected	Republican	George Hasay	8,742	58.37
117	Republican	George Hasay	Re-elected	Democratic	William H. Conyngham	6,234	41.63
118	Democratic	Thomas Tigue	Re-elected	Democratic	Thomas Tigue	11,316	100.00
119	Democratic	Stanley Jarolin	Defeated in primary	Democratic	John Yudichak	10,253	75.88
119	Democratic	Stanley Jarolin	Defeated in primary	Republican	Jean Sepling	3,260	24.12
120	Democratic	Phyllis Mundy	Re-elected	Democratic	Phyllis Mundy	9,319	61.30
120	Democratic	Phyllis Mundy	Re-elected	Republican	William Bill James	5,883	38.70
121	Democratic	Kevin Blaum	Re-elected	Democratic	Kevin Blaum	6,722	68.84
121	Democratic	Kevin Blaum	Re-elected	Republican	Stephen J. Urban	3,043	31.16
122	Democratic	Keith R. McCall	Re-elected	Democratic	Keith R. McCall	10,109	100.00
123	Democratic	Edward Lucyk	Re-elected	Democratic	Edward Lucyk	10,189	52.42
123	Democratic	Edward Lucyk	Re-elected	Republican	Clyde Champ Holman	9,250	47.58
124	Republican	Dave Argall	Re-elected	Republican	Dave Argall	10,978	70.34
124	Republican	Dave Argall	Re-elected	Democratic	Victoria Lynn Kresge	4,629	29.66
125	Republican	Bob Allen	Re-elected	Republican	Bob Allen	11,319	74.07
125	Republican	Bob Allen	Re-elected	Democratic	John Strokelitus	3,962	25.93
126	Democratic	Dante Santoni	Re-elected	Democratic	Dante Santoni	10,486	69.74
126	Democratic	Dante Santoni	Re-elected	Republican	John Fielding	4,549	30.26
127	Democratic	Thomas Caltagirone	Re-elected	Democratic	Thomas Caltagirone	5,094	66.04
127	Democratic	Thomas Caltagirone	Re-elected	Republican	Gregory P. Garwood	2,620	33.96
128	Republican	Sam Rohrer	Re-elected	Republican	Sam Rohrer	12,608	100.00
129	Republican	Sheila Miller	Re-elected	Republican	Sheila Miller	13,649	100.00
130	Republican	Dennis Leh	Re-elected	Republican	Dennis Leh	8,907	62.81
130	Republican	Dennis Leh	Re-elected	Democratic	Joseph A. O'Keefe	4,659	32.85
130	Republican	Dennis Leh	Re-elected	Libertarian	Frank S. Noecker Jr.	615	4.34
131	Republican	Pat Browne	Re-elected	Republican	Pat Browne	7,224	64.03
131	Republican	Pat Browne	Re-elected	Democratic	Martha E. Falk	4,059	35.97
132	Republican	Charlie Dent	Retired to run for State Senate	Democratic	Jennifer Mann	6,835	52.14
132	Republican	Charlie Dent	Retired to run for State Senate	Republican	David K. Bausch	6,130	46.77
132	Republican	Charlie Dent	Retired to run for State Senate	Independent	David A. Clark	143	1.09
133	Democratic	T. J. Rooney	Re-elected	Democratic	T. J. Rooney	7,888	65.10
133	Democratic	T. J. Rooney	Re-elected	Republican	Joseph T. Heber	4,229	34.90
134	Republican	Donald Snyder	Re-elected	Republican	Donald Snyder	15,611	77.11
134	Republican	Donald Snyder	Re-elected	Democratic	Sheryl Hunt	4,634	22.89
135	Democratic	Lisa Boscola	Retired to run for State Senate	Democratic	Steve Samuelson	8,884	51.58
135	Democratic	Lisa Boscola	Retired to run for State Senate	Republican	Mark S. Mitman	8,341	48.42
136	Democratic	Joseph Corpora	Retired	Democratic	Robert L. Freeman	8,136	66.99
136	Democratic	Joseph Corpora	Retired	Republican	Brian Monahan	4,010	33.01
137	Republican	Leonard Gruppo	Retired to run for State Senate	Democratic	Richard Grucela	9,453	50.50
137	Republican	Leonard Gruppo	Retired to run for State Senate	Republican	Brian Prest	9,265	49.50
138	Republican	Craig Dally	Re-elected	Republican	Craig Dally	10,972	100.00
139	Republican	Jerry Birmelin	Re-elected	Republican	Jerry Birmelin	13,704	100.00
140	Democratic	Thomas C. Corrigan	Re-elected	Democratic	Thomas C. Corrigan	7,941	100.00
141	Democratic	Anthony Melio	Re-elected	Democratic	Anthony Melio	8,462	71.92
141	Democratic	Anthony Melio	Re-elected	Republican	John R. Petras	3,304	28.08
142	Republican	Matthew N. Wright	Re-elected	Republican	Matthew N. Wright	9,556	65.77
142	Republican	Matthew N. Wright	Re-elected	Democratic	Richard P. Gennetti	4,973	34.23
143	Republican	Joe Conti	Retired to run for State Senate	Republican	Chuck McIlhinney	11,133	50.67
143	Republican	Joe Conti	Retired to run for State Senate	Democratic	Henry W. Rowan	10,837	49.33
144	Republican	Thomas W. Druce	Re-elected	Republican	Thomas W. Druce	11,834	100.00
145	Republican	Paul Clymer	Re-elected	Republican	Paul Clymer	10,304	91.19
145	Republican	Paul Clymer	Re-elected	Libertarian	Richard J. Piotrowski	996	8.81
146	Republican	Robert Reber	Retired	Republican	Mary Ann Dailey	7,331	55.24
146	Republican	Robert Reber	Retired	Democratic	Eileen McCaul	5,283	39.81
146	Republican	Robert Reber	Retired	Libertarian	John H. Haley	658	4.96
147	Republican	Raymond Bunt	Re-elected	Republican	Raymond Bunt	12,880	100.00
148	Republican	Lita Indzel Cohen	Re-elected	Republican	Lita Indzel Cohen	14,358	67.97
148	Republican	Lita Indzel Cohen	Re-elected	Democratic	Mary Jo Pauxtis	6,766	32.03
149	Democratic	Constance H. Williams	Re-elected	Democratic	Constance H. Williams	11,143	57.84
149	Democratic	Constance H. Williams	Re-elected	Republican	Mary Wright	8,121	42.16
150	Republican	John A. Lawless	Re-elected	Republican	John A. Lawless	11,433	100.00
151	Republican	Eugene McGill	Re-elected	Republican	Eugene McGill	11,563	63.53
151	Republican	Eugene McGill	Re-elected	Democratic	John J. Black Jr.	6,637	36.47
152	Republican	Roy Cornell	Re-elected	Republican	Roy Cornell	12,564	92.67
152	Republican	Roy Cornell	Re-elected	Libertarian	John F. Russo	994	7.33
153	Republican	Ellen Bard	Re-elected	Republican	Ellen Bard	14,319	93.83
153	Republican	Ellen Bard	Re-elected	Libertarian	Daniel S. Kujala	942	6.17
154	Democratic	Lawrence Curry	Re-elected	Democratic	Lawrence Curry	15,405	69.44
154	Democratic	Lawrence Curry	Re-elected	Republican	Mary Amonitti	6,780	30.56
155	Republican	Curt Schroder	Re-elected	Republican	Curt Schroder	12,962	100.00
156	Republican	Elinor Z. Taylor	Re-elected	Republican	Elinor Z. Taylor	12,386	100.00
157	Republican	Carole A. Rubley	Re-elected	Republican	Carole A. Rubley	11,886	73.02
157	Republican	Carole A. Rubley	Re-elected	Democratic	James A. Del-Nero	4,392	26.98
158	Republican	L. Chris Ross	Re-elected	Republican	L. Chris Ross	12,524	72.91
158	Republican	L. Chris Ross	Re-elected	Democratic	B. Kristin Hoover	4,653	27.09
159	Democratic	Thaddeus Kirkland	Re-elected	Democratic	Thaddeus Kirkland	5,465	52.63
159	Democratic	Thaddeus Kirkland	Re-elected	Republican	James L. Johnson	4,918	47.37
160	Republican	Stephen Barrar	Re-elected	Republican	Stephen Barrar	12,144	74.77
160	Republican	Stephen Barrar	Re-elected	Democratic	Ed Kulesa	4,097	25.23
161	Republican	Tom Gannon	Re-elected	Republican	Tom Gannon	11,419	67.83
161	Republican	Tom Gannon	Re-elected	Democratic	Nick Anastasio	5,416	32.17
162	Republican	Ronald C. Raymond	Re-elected	Republican	Ronald C. Raymond	9,323	74.21
162	Republican	Ronald C. Raymond	Re-elected	Democratic	Frank Hauser	3,240	25.79
163	Republican	Nicholas Micozzie	Re-elected	Republican	Nicholas Micozzie	11,563	68.14
163	Republican	Nicholas Micozzie	Re-elected	Democratic	Charlotte K. Hummel	5,407	31.86
164	Republican	Mario Civera	Re-elected	Republican	Mario Civera	14,056	100.00
165	Republican	Bill Adolph	Re-elected	Republican	Bill Adolph	14,196	73.85
165	Republican	Bill Adolph	Re-elected	Democratic	Eric Goldstein	5,026	26.15
166	Democratic	Greg Vitali	Re-elected	Democratic	Greg Vitali	12,796	59.88
166	Democratic	Greg Vitali	Re-elected	Republican	Joseph F. Kelly	8,574	40.12
167	Republican	Bob Flick	Re-elected	Republican	Bob Flick	13,802	100.00
168	Republican	Matthew J. Ryan	Re-elected	Republican	Matthew J. Ryan	13,857	72.47
168	Republican	Matthew J. Ryan	Re-elected	Democratic	Randall L. Sampson	5,263	27.53
169	Republican	Dennis M. O'Brien	Re-elected	Republican	Dennis M. O'Brien	9,812	78.38
169	Republican	Dennis M. O'Brien	Re-elected	Democratic	Jack Noonan	2,706	21.62
170	Republican	George T. Kenney	Re-elected	Republican	George T. Kenney	8,841	68.16
170	Republican	George T. Kenney	Re-elected	Democratic	Francine G. Levin	4,130	31.84
171	Republican	Kerry Benninghoff	Re-elected	Republican	Kerry Benninghoff	13,423	100.00
172	Republican	John Perzel	Re-elected	Republican	John Perzel	10,949	72.83
172	Republican	John Perzel	Re-elected	Democratic	James Raynock Jr.	4,084	27.17
173	Democratic	Michael McGeehan	Re-elected	Democratic	Michael McGeehan	8,437	73.60
173	Democratic	Michael McGeehan	Re-elected	Republican	Dan Sansoni	3,026	26.40
174	Democratic	Alan Butkovitz	Re-elected	Democratic	Alan Butkovitz	10,210	100.00
175	Democratic	Marie Lederer	Re-elected	Democratic	Marie Lederer	6,896	72.43
175	Democratic	Marie Lederer	Re-elected	Republican	Anthony N. Radocaj	2,625	27.57
176	Republican	Christopher Wogan	Re-elected	Republican	Christopher Wogan	9,778	62.82
176	Republican	Christopher Wogan	Re-elected	Democratic	Bill McKeown	5,787	37.18
177	Republican	John J. Taylor	Re-elected	Republican	John J. Taylor	6,485	74.48
177	Republican	John J. Taylor	Re-elected	Democratic	George W. Still IV	2,222	25.52
178	Republican	Roy Reinard	Re-elected	Republican	Roy Reinard	11,992	100.00
179	Democratic	William Rieger	Re-elected	Democratic	William Rieger	5,112	83.27
179	Democratic	William Rieger	Re-elected	Republican	Ronald J. Heater	760	12.38
179	Democratic	William Rieger	Re-elected	Veronica Frazier Party	Veronica Frazier	267	4.35
180	Democratic	Benjamin Ramos	Re-elected	Democratic	Benjamin Ramos	4,488	86.24
180	Democratic	Benjamin Ramos	Re-elected	Republican	Nestor Gonzalez	716	13.76
181	Democratic	Curtis Thomas	Re-elected	Democratic	Curtis Thomas	9,041	100.00
182	Democratic	Babette Josephs	Re-elected	Democratic	Babette Josephs	10,698	93.42
182	Democratic	Babette Josephs	Re-elected	Libertarian	Jonathan S. Goldstein	754	6.58
183	Republican	Julie Harhart	Re-elected	Republican	Julie Harhart	8,338	52.84
183	Republican	Julie Harhart	Re-elected	Democratic	Robert G. Klock	7,441	47.16
184	Democratic	William F. Keller	Re-elected	Democratic	William F. Keller	8,209	81.07
184	Democratic	William F. Keller	Re-elected	Republican	Gina Andrew	1,917	18.93
185	Democratic	Robert Donatucci	Re-elected	Democratic	Robert Donatucci	8,026	76.23
185	Democratic	Robert Donatucci	Re-elected	Republican	Anthony J. Giordano	2,503	23.77
186	Democratic	Harold James	Re-elected	Democratic	Harold James	9,468	87.63
186	Democratic	Harold James	Re-elected	Republican	Charles Reeves	1,337	12.37
187	Republican	Paul Semmel	Re-elected	Republican	Paul Semmel	12,754	73.19
187	Republican	Paul Semmel	Re-elected	Democratic	Arlene Dabrow	4,671	26.81
188	Democratic	James R. Roebuck Jr.	Re-elected	Democratic	James R. Roebuck Jr.	9,147	94.52
188	Democratic	James R. Roebuck Jr.	Re-elected	Republican	Barbara L. Jacobs	530	5.48
189	Democratic	Joseph Battisto	Re-elected	Democratic	Joseph Battisto	9,651	88.70
189	Democratic	Joseph Battisto	Re-elected	Libertarian	Gail Mastroberte	1,229	11.30
190	Democratic	Michael Horsey	Re-elected	Democratic	Michael Horsey	9,214	93.46
190	Democratic	Michael Horsey	Re-elected	Republican	Maureen M. Davis	645	6.54
191	Democratic	Anthony H. Williams	Re-elected (Note: Vacated seat after getting elected to the State Senate)	Democratic	Anthony H. Williams	9,422	87.63
191	Democratic	Anthony H. Williams	Re-elected	Republican	Robert J. Johns	1,330	12.37
192	Democratic	Louise Bishop	Re-elected	Democratic	Louise Bishop	12,031	87.79
192	Democratic	Louise Bishop	Re-elected	Republican	Vincent D. Gordon	1,673	12.21
193	Republican	Steven R. Nickol	Re-elected	Republican	Steven R. Nickol	10,628	100.00
194	Democratic	Kathy Manderino	Re-elected	Democratic	Kathy Manderino	9,690	78.86
194	Democratic	Kathy Manderino	Re-elected	Republican	Patsy Taylor	2,597	21.14
195	Democratic	Frank L. Oliver	Re-elected	Democratic	Frank L. Oliver	9,073	87.46
195	Democratic	Frank L. Oliver	Re-elected	Republican	Marie P. Bradley	1,301	12.54
196	Republican	Todd Platts	Re-elected	Republican	Todd Platts	13,227	80.26
196	Republican	Todd Platts	Re-elected	Democratic	Earl Max Downs	3,254	19.74
197	Democratic	Andrew Carn	Re-elected	Democratic	Andrew Carn	11,042	94.00
197	Democratic	Andrew Carn	Re-elected	Republican	Edward P. Bevans	705	6.00
198	Democratic	Rosita Youngblood	Re-elected	Democratic	Rosita Youngblood	11,539	100.00
199	Republican	Albert Masland	Re-elected	Republican	Albert Masland	11,445	79.79
199	Republican	Albert Masland	Re-elected	Democratic	Margaret Tricarico	2,899	20.21
200	Democratic	LeAnna Washington	Re-elected	Democratic	LeAnna Washington	14,172	100.00
201	Democratic	John L. Myers	Re-elected	Democratic	John L. Myers	11,424	95.26
201	Democratic	John L. Myers	Re-elected	Republican	Joseph Louis Messa	568	4.74
202	Democratic	Mark B. Cohen	Re-elected	Democratic	Mark B. Cohen	8,344	100.00
203	Democratic	Dwight Evans	Re-elected	Democratic	Dwight Evans	11,529	92.51
203	Democratic	Dwight Evans	Re-elected	Republican	John Paul Mugford	934	7.49
