= Gerald Nailor =

Gerald Nailor may refer to:

- Gerald Nailor Sr. (1917–1952), Navajo painter
- Jerry L. Nailor (born 1946), Republican senator from Pennsylvania's 88th District
