= John Alden (disambiguation) =

John Alden (1599–1687) was a cooper on the Pilgrim ship Mayflower.

John Alden may also refer to:

- John Alden (sailor) (c. 1623–1701), shipmaster and survivor of the Salem witch trials; son of Mayflower pilgrim John Alden
- John Alden (naval architect) (1884–1962), American naval architect
- John Alden (theatre) (1908–1962), Australian actor and director
- John Alden (politician) (1942–1990), Pennsylvania politician
