= 1998 Pennsylvania Senate election =

- November 3, 1998

All even-numbered seats in the Pennsylvania State Senate 26 seats needed for a majority

	Majority party	Minority party
Leader	Robert Jubelirer	Bob Mellow
Party	Republican	Democratic
Leader since	March 15, 1994	January 3, 1989
Leader's seat	30th	22nd
Last election	30	20
Seats won	16	9
Seats after	30	20
Seat change	Steady	Steady
Popular vote	708,680	663,497
Percentage	51.26%	47.99%
- Democratic hold Democratic gain Republican hold Republican gain No election Republican: 50–60% 60–70% 70–80% 80–90% >90% Democratic: 50–60% 60–70% 70–80% 80–90% >90%
President Pro Tempore before election
Robert Jubelirer
Republican
Elected President Pro Tempore
Robert Jubelirer
Republican

The 1998 elections for the Pennsylvania State Senate were held on November 3, with 25 of 50 districts being contested. Primary elections were held on May 19, 1998. The term of office for those elected in 1998 began when the Senate convened in January 1999. Pennsylvania State Senators are elected for four-year terms, with half of the seats up for election every two years. The election coincided with the 1998 Pennsylvania gubernatorial election, United States House of Representatives elections and the election of the entirety of the Pennsylvania House of Representatives.

Republicans had controlled the chamber since the 1994 election.

== Results summary ==
=== Retiring incumbents ===
==== Democrats ====
1. District 8: Hardy Williams retired.
2. District 16: Roy Afflerbach retired.

==== Republicans ====
1. District 18: Joseph Uliana retired to run for Congress.
2. District 28: Dan Delp retired.
3. District 34: Doyle Corman retired.

== Primary elections ==
=== Democratic primary ===
1998 Pennsylvania Senate elections Democratic primary
District	Candidates	Votes	Percent
2	Christine Tartaglione	10,617	100.00
4	Allyson Schwartz	13,400	100.00
6	Karen Selvaggi	4,997	100.00
8	Anthony H. Williams	10,842	100.00
10	No candidate filed for party.		
12	Andrew T. Hornak	3,805	100.00
14	Ray Musto	11,360	100.00
16	Glenn Solt	8,087	100.00
18	Lisa Boscola	8,645	100.00
20	No candidate filed for party.		
22	Bob Mellow	17,329	100.00
24	Dave Nasatir	3,347	100.00
26	Robert W. Small	3,260	100.00
28	Jackie Schenck Kramer	6,588	100.00
30	No candidate filed for party.		
32	Rich Kasunic	14,471	100.00
34	Scott Conklin	7,506	100.00
36	Richard W. Clark Jr.	1,820	100.00
38	Leonard Bodack	13,903	56.95
38	Bonnie DiCarlo	10,509	43.05
40	Bob Seibert Jr.	15,448	100.00
42	Jack Wagner	24,619	100.00
44	No candidate filed for party.		
46	Barry Stout	19,852	100.00
48	Lenny Marrella	4,166	100.00
50	Mary Ann McDanniels-Kulesa	5,095	100.00

=== Republican primary ===
1998 Pennsylvania Senate elections Republican primary
District	Candidates	Votes	Percent
2	Jon S. Mirowitz	2,079	100.00
4	No candidate filed for party.		
6	Tommy Tomlinson	6,997	100.00
8	Listervelt H. Ritter	1,075	100.00
10	Joe Conti	12,713	100.00
12	Stewart Greenleaf	16,490	100.00
14	No candidate filed for party.		
16	Charlie Dent	9,042	100.00
18	Leonard Gruppo	7,679	100.00
20	Charles Lemmond	19,032	100.00
22	Glenn M. Cashuric	6,235	100.00
24	Edwin Holl	16,903	100.00
26	F. Joseph Loeper	14,707	100.00
28	Mike Waugh	11,829	66.21
28	Tom Skehan	6,037	33.79
30	Robert Jubelirer	12,035	100.00
32	David L. Brant	6,286	100.00
34	Jake Corman	8,395	44.41
34	Connie Lucas	6,814	36.05
34	Vicki Bumbarger Wedler	3,694	19.54
36	Noah Wenger	10,191	100.00
38	No candidate filed for party.		
40	Melissa Hart	16,258	100.00
42	No candidate filed for party.		
44	Jim Gerlach	10,840	100.00
46	No candidate filed for party.		
48	David J. Brightbill	12,510	100.00
50	Robert D. Robbins	8,516	100.00

== General election ==
=== Overview ===
Statewide outlook
Affiliation	Candidates	Votes	%	Seats before	Seats up	Seats won	Seats after
Republican	20	708,680	51.26	30	16	16	30
Democratic	22	663,497	47.99	20	9	9	20
Libertarian	4	7,603	0.55	0	0	0	0
Constitution	1	2,007	0.15	0	0	0	0
Reform	1	763	0.06	0	0	0	0
Total	48	1,382,550	100.00	50	25	25	50

=== Close races ===
Three district races had winning margins of less than 15%:

District	Winner	Margin
District 34	Republican	4.2%
District 24	Republican	8.0%
District 18	Democratic (flip)	10.9%

=== District breakdown ===
District	Party	Incumbent	Status	Party	Candidate	Votes	%
2	Democratic	Christine Tartaglione	Re-elected	Democratic	Christine Tartaglione	30,764	76.21
2	Democratic	Christine Tartaglione	Re-elected	Republican	Jon S. Mirowitz	9,603	23.79
4	Democratic	Allyson Schwartz	Re-elected	Democratic	Allyson Schwartz	52,052	100.00
6	Republican	Tommy Tomlinson	Re-elected	Republican	Tommy Tomlinson	31,779	61.74
6	Republican	Tommy Tomlinson	Re-elected	Democratic	Robert C. Sooby	18,930	36.78
6	Republican	Tommy Tomlinson	Re-elected	Reform	D. Daniel Martino	763	1.48
8	Democratic	Hardy Williams	Retired	Democratic	Anthony H. Williams	34,901	87.41
8	Democratic	Hardy Williams	Retired	Republican	Listervelt H. Ritter	5,028	12.59
10	Republican	Joe Conti	Re-elected	Republican	Joe Conti	45,472	63.26
10	Republican	Joe Conti	Re-elected	Democratic	Kathie Brown	22,922	31.89
10	Republican	Joe Conti	Re-elected	Constitution	Jay Russell	2,007	2.79
10	Republican	Joe Conti	Re-elected	Libertarian	Ralph Crance	1,476	2.05
12	Republican	Stewart Greenleaf	Re-elected	Republican	Stewart Greenleaf	49,468	66.65
12	Republican	Stewart Greenleaf	Re-elected	Democratic	Andrew T. Hornak	22,960	30.94
12	Republican	Stewart Greenleaf	Re-elected	Libertarian	Maureen A. Hoban	1,791	2.41
14	Democratic	Ray Musto	Re-elected	Democratic	Ray Musto	34,162	100.00
16	Democratic	Roy Afflerbach	Retired	Republican	Charlie Dent	34,786	59.43
16	Democratic	Roy Afflerbach	Retired	Democratic	Glenn Solt	23,746	40.57
18	Republican	Joseph Uliana	Retired to run for Congress	Democratic	Lisa Boscola	33,888	55.44
18	Republican	Joseph Uliana	Retired to run for Congress	Republican	Leonard Gruppo	27,242	44.56
20	Republican	Charles Lemmond	Re-elected	Republican	Charles Lemmond	49,718	100.00
22	Democratic	Bob Mellow	Re-elected	Democratic	Bob Mellow	54,887	75.93
22	Democratic	Bob Mellow	Re-elected	Republican	Glenn M. Cashuric	17,400	24.07
24	Republican	Edwin Holl	Re-elected	Republican	Edwin Holl	37,635	53.99
24	Republican	Edwin Holl	Re-elected	Democratic	Dave Nasatir	32,069	46.01
26	Republican	F. Joseph Loeper	Re-elected	Republican	F. Joseph Loeper	47,839	70.89
26	Republican	F. Joseph Loeper	Re-elected	Democratic	Robert W. Small	19,642	29.11
28	Republican	Dan Delp	Retired	Republican	Mike Waugh	36,883	63.62
28	Republican	Dan Delp	Retired	Democratic	Jackie Schenck Kramer	21,094	36.38
30	Republican	Robert Jubelirer	Re-elected	Republican	Robert Jubelirer	43,769	100.00
32	Democratic	Rich Kasunic	Re-elected	Democratic	Rich Kasunic	37,960	67.85
32	Democratic	Rich Kasunic	Re-elected	Republican	David L. Brant	17,984	32.15
34	Republican	Doyle Corman	Retired	Republican	Jake Corman	30,129	52.08
34	Republican	Doyle Corman	Retired	Democratic	Scott Conklin	27,724	47.92
36	Republican	Noah Wenger	Re-elected	Republican	Noah Wenger	43,949	81.17
36	Republican	Noah Wenger	Re-elected	Democratic	Richard W. Clark Jr.	10,195	18.83
38	Democratic	Leonard Bodack	Re-elected	Democratic	Leonard Bodack	35,104	92.67
38	Democratic	Leonard Bodack	Re-elected	Libertarian	Harold Kyriazi	2,778	7.33
40	Republican	Melissa Hart	Re-elected	Republican	Melissa Hart	49,571	67.42
40	Republican	Melissa Hart	Re-elected	Democratic	Bob Seibert Jr.	22,392	30.46
40	Republican	Melissa Hart	Re-elected	Libertarian	Ron Rosenberger	1,558	2.12
42	Democratic	Jack Wagner	Re-elected	Democratic	Jack Wagner	39,124	100.00
44	Republican	Jim Gerlach	Re-elected	Republican	Jim Gerlach	46,472	100.00
46	Democratic	Barry Stout	Re-elected (Note: Cross-endorsed by the Republican Party.)	Democratic	Barry Stout	51,074	100.00
48	Republican	David J. Brightbill	Re-elected	Republican	David J. Brightbill	43,939	69.49
48	Republican	David J. Brightbill	Re-elected	Democratic	Lenny Marrella	19,296	30.51
50	Republican	Robert D. Robbins	Re-elected	Republican	Robert D. Robbins	40,014	68.25
50	Republican	Robert D. Robbins	Re-elected	Democratic	Mary Ann McDanniels-Kulesa	18,611	31.75

== See also ==
- Elections in Pennsylvania
- List of Pennsylvania state legislatures
