= Mantz =

Mantz is a German surname. Notable people with the surname include:

- Baltus Mantz, American politician
- Carl W. Mantz, American politician from Pennsylvania
- Felix Manz, also known as Felix Mantz, co-founder of the original Swiss Brethren Anabaptist congregation
- Johnny Mantz, American racecar driver
- Paul Mantz, air racing pilot
