= James F. Prendergast =

American politician (1917–1985)

Member of the Pennsylvania House of Representatives from the 136th district
- In office 1969–1978
- Preceded by: District created
- Succeeded by: Edmund J. Sieminski

Member of the Pennsylvania House of Representatives from the 2nd district
- In office 1967–1968
- In office 1959–1964

Member of the Pennsylvania House of Representatives from the 3rd district
- In office 1965–1966

Personal details
- Born: February 5, 1917 Easton, Pennsylvania, U.S.
- Died: April 29, 1985 (aged 68) Easton, Pennsylvania, U.S.
- Resting place: Gethsemane Cemetery; Easton, Pennsylvania, U.S.
- Party: Democratic
- Spouse: Anne Naabe
- Children: 7
- Education: Lafayette College (BA); Georgetown University Law School (LLB)
- Occupation: Politician; lawyer

James F. Prendergast (February 5, 1917 – April 29, 1985) was a Democratic member of the Pennsylvania House of Representatives. He served from 1958 to 1978.

== Early life ==
James F. Prendergast was born on February 5, 1917, in Easton, Pennsylvania, to Elizabeth (née Hegarty) and John L. Prendergast. He graduated from Easton Area High School in 1934. He worked as a laborer for Lehigh Valley Railroad in Easton and for Bethlehem Steel and Dixie Cup. He graduated from Lafayette College with a Bachelor of Arts in 1938 and from Georgetown University Law School with a Bachelor of Laws in 1951. He was admitted to the bar in Washington, D.C., in 1952.

== Career ==
In 1953, Prendergast opened a law practice in Easton. He served in the United States Marine Corps in World War II, where he lost his right arm fighting in the Battle of Saipan. He received the Navy Cross and two Purple Hearts for his service. He attained the rank of second lieutenant.

Prendergast was a Democrat. He served in the Pennsylvania House of Representatives, representing the 2nd district from 1959 to 1964 and from 1967 to 1968, representing the 3rd district from 1965 to 1966, and representing the 136th district, from 1969 to 1978. He was majority caucus secretary from 1965 to 1966, minority caucus chairman from 1967 to 1968 and from 1973 to 1974. He was majority whip from 1969 to 1972 and majority administrator from 1975 to 1975 and from 1977 to 1978. He was a member of the legislative budget and finance committee from 1963 to 1964 and a member of the joint state government commission from 1967 to 1974. He was a delegate to the 1968 Pennsylvania Constitutional Convention. There were allegations that his family was improperly using his legislative telephone credit card. In the 1978 Democratic primary, he defeated Robert L. Freeman, but lost to Republican nominee Edmund J. Sieminski. He was opposed to abortion and pornography. He supported the public utility employees strike, and reluctantly supported the state lottery system.

== Personal life ==
Prendergast married Anna Naabe. They had three sons and four daughters, John Michael, Timothy James, James William, Therese Anne, Mary Elizabeth, Kathy P. and Virginia N. He was a member of St. Bernard's Catholic Church in Easton. He lived on Paxinosa Avenue in Easton.

Prendergast died on April 29, 1985, at Easton Hospital. He was buried at Gethsemane Cemetery in Easton.
