= Max Homer =

American politician

Max H. Homer Jr.

Member of the Pennsylvania House of Representatives from the 45th district
- In office 1969–1974
- Preceded by: District created
- Succeeded by: Fred Trello

Member of the Pennsylvania House of Representatives from the Allegheny County district
- In office 1965–1968

Personal details
- Born: May 20, 1935 Stowe Township, Pennsylvania
- Died: October 30, 2014 (aged 79) Pennsylvania, United States
- Party: Democratic

Max H. Homer (May 20, 1935 – October 30, 2014) was a Democratic member of the Pennsylvania House of Representatives.

He was convicted of extortion under color of official right in August 1975.

Homer went to Thiel College, received his master's degree from Duquesne University and his doctorate degree from West Virginia University. He then taught high school and was a school district superintendent. Homer died on October 30, 2014.
