= Phillip Ruggiero =

American politician

Phillip S. Ruggiero

Member of the Pennsylvania House of Representatives from the 137th district
- In office 1969–1978
- Preceded by: District created
- Succeeded by: Leonard Gruppo

Member of the Pennsylvania House of Representatives from the Northampton County district
- In office 1967–1968

Personal details
- Born: March 24, 1928 Washington Township, Northampton County, Pennsylvania
- Died: November 7, 2003 (aged 75) Easton, Pennsylvania
- Party: Democratic

Phillip S. Ruggiero (March 24, 1928 – November 7, 2003) was a Democratic member of the Pennsylvania House of Representatives. He was born in Washington Township, Northampton County.

He died in 2003 at a hospital. He had previously resided in a nursing home.
