= Duane Milne =

American politician

Member of the Pennsylvania House of Representatives from the 167th district
- In office January 2, 2007 – November 30, 2018
- Preceded by: Bob Flick
- Succeeded by: Kristine Howard

Personal details
- Born: June 15, 1967 (age 59) Media, Pennsylvania, U.S.
- Party: Republican
- Spouse: Jean
- Children: 1
- Education: College of William & Mary (BA); University of Delaware (PhD)

Duane Milne (born 1967) is an American politician and academic who served as a Republican member of the Pennsylvania House of Representatives, representing the 167th legislative district. He was first elected in 2006.

== Education ==
Milne attended the College of William and Mary and earned a Doctor of Philosophy in Political Science from the University of Delaware.

== Career ==
He is a professor of political science at West Chester University and has written academic papers on federalism and public sector management. He also has worked as an organizational consultant and has gained international experience through business projects in countries throughout Asia, including China, Japan, South Korea and the Philippines.

Milne has served as an officer in the Army Reserve and is a member of the Chester County Voting Reform Commission.

Pennsylvania House of Representatives
Preceded by Bob Flick	Member of the Pennsylvania House of Representatives from the 167th district 2007–2018	Succeeded by Kristine Howard
