= Herbert Zearfoss =

American politician

Herbert K. Zearfoss

Member of the Pennsylvania House of Representatives from the 167th district
- In office January 7, 1969 – November 30, 1978
- Preceded by: District Created
- Succeeded by: John Alden

Personal details
- Born: October 13, 1929 Montandon, Pennsylvania, U.S.
- Died: April 8, 2008 (aged 78) Philadelphia, Pennsylvania, U.S.
- Party: Republican
- Spouse(s): Thelma McCarthy (1953–1984), Suzanne Vander Veer (1992–2008)
- Children: 3
- Education: Middleburg High School, Bucknell University, American University
- Occupation: Attorney, Politician

Herbert Keyser "Herb" Zearfoss (October 13, 1929 – April 8, 2008) was a Republican member of the Pennsylvania House of Representatives.

== Early life ==
Zearfoss was born in Montandon, Pennsylvania, and graduated from Middleburg High School in 1947. He graduated from Bucknell University in 1951, and attended Yale University. Zearfoss served in the Naval Reserve from 1954 through 1958, and earned his J.D. from American University in 1958. He married his first wife, Thelma, in 1953. The couple had three children; Timothy, Jonathan and Sarah.

== Early professional career ==
Zearfoss was admitted to the bar and opened a law office in Lewisburg in 1959. He later joined Fidelity Mutual Life Insurance Company in Philadelphia, where he served as Assistant Counsel from 1960 through 1967. Zearfoss was also a Justice of the Peace in Radnor Township from 1966 through 1967, later served as an officer in the Insurance Federation of Pennsylvania from 1967 through 1968.

== Political career ==
He became the first person to represent the newly created 167th district of the Pennsylvania House of Representatives upon his election in 1968. He retired from the legislature following the 1977-78 session, and was succeeded by fellow Republican John Alden.

== Later life ==
Following his departure from the legislature, Zearfoss returned to Fidelity Mutual. He served as Senior Vice President and General Counsel for the company until 1982. He later joined Provident Indemnity Life Insurance, where he served as Senior Vice President, Secretary, and General Counsel until 1991. After leaving Provident in 1991, he served as Assistant General Counsel and Assistant Secretary at Teleflex, Inc, until his retirement in 2001. In addition, he served as the President at the Genealogical Society of Pennsylvania.

Zearfoss' first wife, Thelma, died in 1984. He married Suzanne Vander Veer in 1992. Zearfoss died in 2008.
