= Justin Walsh =

American politician (born 1972)

Westmoreland County Court of Common Pleas Judge
- Incumbent
- Assumed office November 5, 2019

Member of the Pennsylvania House of Representatives from the 58th district
- In office January 3, 2017 – November 5, 2019
- Preceded by: Ted Harhai
- Succeeded by: Eric Davanzo

Personal details
- Born: April 15, 1972 (age 54) Donora, Pennsylvania
- Party: Republican
- Education: Saint Francis University (BA); Seton Hall University School of Law (JD)

Justin Walsh (born April 15, 1972) is an American attorney and politician who served in the Pennsylvania House of Representatives from the 58th district from 2017 to 2019. In 2019 he was elected a judge in Westmoreland County, Pennsylvania.

== Education ==
Justin Walsh earned his Bachelors of Arts degree in political science from Saint Francis University in 1994. After graduating summa cum laude from Saint Francis, Walsh attended Seton Hall University School of Law. He graduated with his Juris Doctor in 1997.

== Career ==
After law school, Walsh began working as an attorney in Greensburg, Pennsylvania. Walsh worked as a partner at Amatangelo, Baisey & Walsh.

Walsh assumed the position of Pennsylvania House of Representatives Representing District 58 after he was elected on November 8, 2016. Walsh has served on several House committees: the House Game and Fisheries Committee, the House Judiciary Committee, the Gaming Oversight Committee, and the House Labor & Industry Committee.

In February 2019, Walsh announced his would be running for a judgeship on the Westmoreland Court of Commons Pleas. On November 5, 2019, Walsh won his election to the bench.

== Campaign for House Representatives ==
In April 2016, Walsh ran unopposed for the Republican nominee for the Pennsylvania House of Representatives District 58. The general election was held on November 8, 2016, Walsh won with 61.5% of the vote.

While running for state representative, it was revealed that Justin Walsh had an arrest record. In 1995, while in law school, he pled guilty to harassment. A year later, Walsh was arrested and charged with 13 counts: 4 counts aggravated assault; 4 counts simple assault; 4 counts recklessly endangering another person and 1 count of disorderly conduct engaged in fighting.

In 2018, Walsh ran as the incumbent for the 58th District. In the general election, held on November 6, 2018, Walsh defeated his opponent by earning 61.7% of the vote.
