= Keith Greiner =

American politician

Member of the Pennsylvania House of Representatives from the 43rd district
- Incumbent
- Assumed office January 1, 2013
- Preceded by: Scott W. Boyd

Personal details
- Born: May 2, 1965 (age 61)
- Party: Republican
- Education: Penn State University
- Occupation: Certified Public Accountant

Keith J. Greiner is a Republican member of the Pennsylvania House of Representatives. He has represented the 43rd district, based in eastern Lancaster County, since 2013.

Greiner graduated from Conestoga Valley High School and received a bachelor's degree in accounting from Penn State University. He has worked for over 25 years as a certified public accountant. Greiner entered electoral politics by successfully running for the Upper Leacock Township Board of Supervisors. At the time of his election to Harrisburg, he was the incumbent Lancaster County Controller.

== Committee assignments ==
- Appropriations, Subcommittee on Fiscal Policy - Chair
- Commerce
- Finance, Secretary
- Veterans Affairs & Emergency Preparedness
