= George Haudenshield =

American politician (1920–2011)

George K. Haudenshield

Member of the Pennsylvania House of Representatives from the 43rd district
- In office 1969–1970
- Preceded by: District created
- Succeeded by: James Knepper

Member of the Pennsylvania House of Representatives from the Allegheny County district
- In office 1961–1968

Personal details
- Born: June 11, 1920 Carnegie, Pennsylvania
- Died: February 19, 2011 (aged 90) Scott Township, Pennsylvania
- Party: Republican

George K. Haudenshield (June 11, 1920 – February 19, 2011) was a Republican member of the Pennsylvania House of Representatives.

Haudenshield was a dentist, and also served in the United States Navy (1942–1945) during World War II.
