= James Knepper =

American politician

James W. Knepper, Jr.

Pennsylvania Secretary of Labor and Industry
- In office September 10, 1984 – January 20, 1987
- Governor: Dick Thornburgh
- Preceded by: Barry Stern
- Succeeded by: Harris Wofford

Member of the Pennsylvania House of Representatives from the 43rd district
- In office January 3, 1971 – November 30, 1980
- Preceded by: George Haudenshield
- Succeeded by: Daniel Fleck

Personal details
- Born: May 12, 1932 Bellefonte, Pennsylvania, US
- Died: May 30, 2016 (aged 84) Pittsburgh, Pennsylvania, US
- Party: Republican
- Education: Carnegie Mellon University
- Occupation: Publisher, politician

James W. Knepper, Jr. (May 12, 1932 – May 30, 2016) was an American politician who served as a Republican member of the Pennsylvania House of Representatives. He was born in Bellefonte, Pennsylvania, and died of cancer in 2016, aged 84, in Pittsburgh.

Party political offices
Preceded by Patrick A. Gleason	Republican nominee for Auditor General of Pennsylvania; 1980	Succeeded by Susan M. Shanaman
