= John Scheaffer =

American politician

John E. Scheaffer

Member of the Pennsylvania House of Representatives from the 88th district
- In office 1971–1980
- Preceded by: Lourene George
- Succeeded by: John Kennedy

Personal details
- Born: August 28, 1916 Pottstown, Pennsylvania, U.S.
- Died: March 29, 1990 (aged 73)
- Party: Republican

John E. Scheaffer (August 28, 1916 – March 29, 1990) is a former Republican member of the Pennsylvania House of Representatives.
