= Eric Davanzo =

American politician (born c.1976)

Member of the Pennsylvania House of Representatives from the 58th district
- Incumbent
- Assumed office April 6, 2020
- Preceded by: Justin Walsh

Personal details
- Born: c. 1976 Westmoreland County, Pennsylvania, U.S.
- Party: Republican
- Spouse: Rachelle
- Children: 2
- Education: Yough High School

Eric Davanzo (born c. 1976) is an American politician who currently represents the 58th District in the Pennsylvania House of Representatives.

== Early life and education ==
Davanzo was born in Westmoreland County, Pennsylvania to Richard and Kathleen Davanzo. He graduated from Yough High School in 1994.

== Career ==
Previously a carpenter, Davanzo won a special election in March 2020 to represent the 58th District in the Pennsylvania House of Representatives. He won reelection to a full term later that year, and again in 2022.

In 2020, Davanzo was among twenty-six Pennsylvania House Republicans who called for the reversal of Joe Biden's certification as the winner of Pennsylvania's electoral votes in the 2020 United States presidential election, citing false claims of election irregularities.

In 2022, Davanzo was subject to a whistleblower lawsuit after he fired a staffer for reporting a positive test for mold in his district office.

== Personal life ==
Davanzo lives in Smithton, Pennsylvania with his wife Rachelle and their two daughters.
