= Edmund Sieminski =

American politician (1932–2021)

Edmund J. Sieminski

Member of the Pennsylvania House of Representatives from the 136th district
- In office 1979–1982
- Preceded by: James F. Pendergast
- Succeeded by: Robert L. Freeman

Personal details
- Born: October 20, 1932 Scranton, Pennsylvania, US
- Died: June 14, 2021 (aged 88) Wilkes-Barre, Pennsylvania, US
- Party: Republican

Edmund John Sieminski (October 20, 1932 – June 14, 2021) was a Republican member of the Pennsylvania House of Representatives.

== Biography ==
Sieminski served in the Pennsylvania House of Representatives after being elected to serve a district that included the city of Easton in Northampton County, Pennsylvania.

Sieminski entered politics after a distinguished career as an officer in the United States Army, retiring with a rank of lieutenant colonel. He was a decorated combat veteran, having served two tours in the Vietnam War.

Sieminski graduated with a Bachelor of Science degree from the University of Scranton in 1955 and Master of Science degree from Duquesne University in 1974.
