= Kristine Howard =

American politician (born 1961)

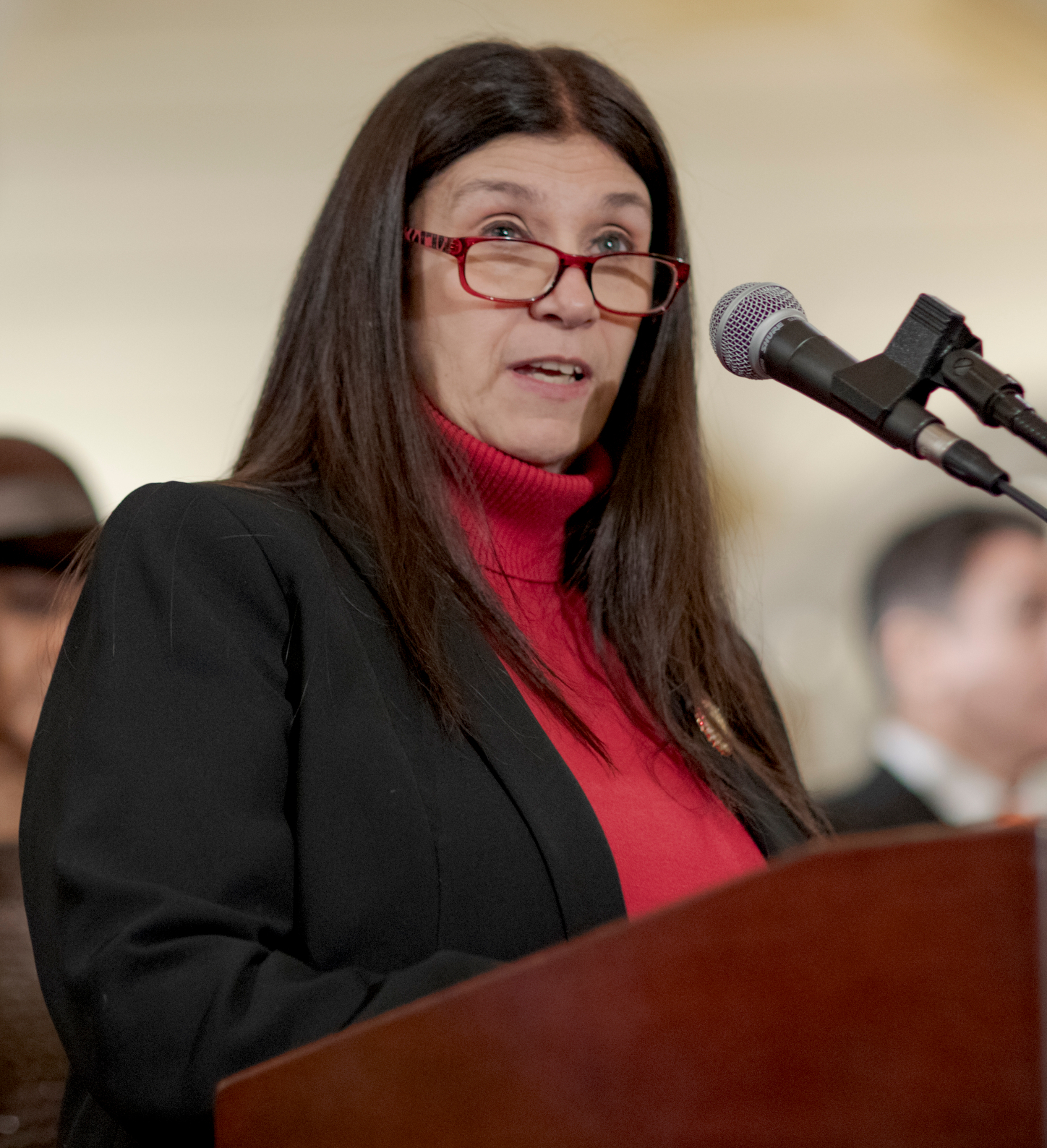

Member of the Pennsylvania House of Representatives from the 167th district
- Incumbent
- Assumed office January 1, 2019
- Preceded by: Duane Milne

Personal details
- Born: June 7, 1961 (age 65) Haddon Heights, New Jersey, U.S.
- Party: Democratic
- Education: University of Pennsylvania
- Website: www.pahouse.com/howard

Kristine Howard (born June 7, 1961) is a Democratic member of the Pennsylvania House of Representatives, representing the 167th legislative district. She was first elected on November 6, 2018.

Howard was born in Haddon Heights, New Jersey. She attended the University of Pennsylvania and graduated with a bachelors in philosophy. She received her law degree from Rutgers Law School. She worked in New Mexico running a legal and social services organization before moving back to Pennsylvania to advocate for youth in foster care as a part of the Philadelphia Volunteer Lawyers for the Arts. Howard lives in Malvern, Pennsylvania. She investigated child abuse in Chester County, when she worked at the Chester County Department of Children, Youth, and Family Services. She currently sits on four committees in the Pennsylvania State House: Agriculture & Rural Affairs, Children & Youth, Judiciary, and State Government.

Pennsylvania House of Representatives
Preceded by Duane Milne	Member of the Pennsylvania House of Representatives from the 167th district 2019–present	Incumbent
