= Joe Emrick =

American politician from Pennsylvania

Member of the Pennsylvania House of Representatives from the 137th district
- Incumbent
- Assumed office January 4, 2011
- Preceded by: Richard Grucela

Personal details
- Born: February 22, 1970 (age 56) Bethlehem, Pennsylvania, U.S.
- Party: Republican
- Spouse: Christine Emrick
- Children: Two
- Education: Kutztown University (Master's); Lycoming College (B.A.)

Joseph T. Emrick (born February 22, 1970) is a politician from the U.S. commonwealth of Pennsylvania. A member of the Republican Party, he is a member of the Pennsylvania House of Representatives for the 137th district.

Emrick currently sits on the Consumer Affairs, Local Government, Professional Licensure, and Tourism & Recreational Development committees.
