= Norman Berson =

American politician (1926–2019)

Member of the Pennsylvania House of Representatives from the 187th district
- In office 1969–1982
- Preceded by: District created
- Succeeded by: Paul Semmel

Member of the Pennsylvania House of Representatives from the Philadelphia County district
- In office 1967–1968

Personal details
- Born: November 19, 1926 New York City, New York
- Died: December 7, 2019 (aged 93) Philadelphia, Pennsylvania
- Party: Democratic

Norman S. Berson (November 19, 1926 – December 7, 2019) was a Democratic member of the Pennsylvania House of Representatives from 1967 to 1982.

== Formative years ==
Born in New York City, New York on November 19, 1926, Berson graduated from the George School in 1946, before earning his Bachelor of Arts degree from Temple University in 1950 and his Bachelor of Law (L.L.B) from Temple's Law School in 1953. A member of the United States Army during World War II, he served from 1945 to 1946.

Professionally, he was then employed as an attorney. He was also co-founder in the 1960's of Central Philadelphia Reform Democrats, an organization of liberal activists who organized to challenge Philadelphia's political establishment of the time.

== Political career ==
A Democrat, Norman S. Berson was elected to the Pennsylvania House of Representatives in 1966, serving a total of eight consecutive terms. Appointed to the Pennsylvania Commission on Sentencing in 1979, he served until 1982. He was not a candidate for reelection to the House in 1982.

In 1977, Berson introduced a bill to reduce the penalty for marijuana possession.

== Later professional life ==
Berson served "of counsel" with Fineman Krekstein & Harris PC and was also a director for RCM Technologies, Inc.

== Death ==
Berson died of Parkinson's disease on December 7, 2019, in Philadelphia, Pennsylvania at age 93.

Norman S. Berson is survived by two children, four grandchildren, and four great-grandchildren.
