= Carl W. Mantz =

American politician

Member of the Pennsylvania House of Representatives from the 187th district
- In office January 2, 2007 – November 30, 2008
- Preceded by: Paul Semmel
- Succeeded by: Gary Day

Personal details
- Born: Elizabeth, New Jersey
- Party: Republican
- Education: University of Baltimore School of Law; Lehigh University; Franklin & Marshall College
- Occupation: attorney
- Website: www.repmantz.com

Military service
- Allegiance: United States
- Branch/service: United States Army

Carl W. Mantz was a Republican member of the Pennsylvania House of Representatives, representing the 187th District in 2007 and 2008. He lives in Kutztown, Pennsylvania. He retired prior to the 2008 election and was succeeded by Republican Gary Day.

Prior to elective office, Mantz was president of the Kutztown Borough Council and a former Assistant District Attorney.
