= Scott W. Boyd =

American politician

Scott Boyd

Member of the Pennsylvania House of Representatives from the 43rd district
- In office January 7, 2003 – 2013
- Preceded by: Jere W. Schuler
- Succeeded by: Keith Greiner

Personal details
- Born: 1958
- Party: Republican
- Spouse: Nancy Boyd
- Education: Millersville University
- Website: www.repboyd.com

Scott W. Boyd is a former Republican member of the Pennsylvania House of Representatives for the 43rd District who was first elected in 2002. He retired in 2013.

== Career ==
Before entering politics, Boyd was the CEO of his family's commercial display business. He was active in politics as a Republican committeeman and as chairman of his local Republican committee. He served as the Lancaster County coordinator for Senator Rick Santorum's re-election in 2000. He was elected in 2002 to replace retiring Rep. Jere Schuler. Boyd won re-election in 2004 and 2006 and will have no Democratic opponent in the 2008 general election.

For the 2009-10 legislative session, Boyd has been appointed to serve on the House Insurance, Labor Relations and Tourism and Recreational Development Committees. Boyd is the Republican chairman of the State House Commerce Committee’s Subcommittee on Economic Development and vice chairman of the House Labor Relations Committee.

== Personal ==
Boyd is a 1976 graduate of Lampeter-Strasburg High School and a 1980 graduate of Millersville University of Pennsylvania, where he graduated magna cum laude with a degree in political science.

He and his wife reside in West Lampeter Township. They have two grown children, a son and daughter.
