= John Kennedy (Pennsylvania politician) =

American political figure (born 1938)

Member of the Pennsylvania House of Representatives from the 88th district
- In office 1981–1988
- Preceded by: John Scheaffer
- Succeeded by: Jerry L. Nailor

Personal details
- Born: March 22, 1938 (age 88) Youngstown, Ohio
- Party: Republican
- Spouse: Bernadette Kennedy

John Kennedy (born March 22, 1938) is an American political figure who served as a Republican member of the Pennsylvania House of Representatives from 1981 to 1988.

Kennedy was a candidate for lieutenant governor in the 2010 election.
