= Rudolph Dinnini =

American politician

Member of the Pennsylvania House of Representatives from the 106th district
- In office 1969–1990
- Preceded by: District created
- Succeeded by: Frank Tulli

Member of the Pennsylvania House of Representatives from the Dauphin County district
- In office 1967–1968

Personal details
- Born: October 19, 1926 Rutherford Heights, Pennsylvania
- Died: December 16, 1998 (aged 72) Harrisburg, Pennsylvania
- Party: Republican

Rudolph V. Dinnini (October 19, 1926 – December 16, 1998) is a former Republican member of the Pennsylvania House of Representatives.
