= Lourene George =

American politician (1913–2004)

Lourene W. George

Member of the Pennsylvania House of Representatives from the 88th district
- In office 1969–1970
- Preceded by: District created
- Succeeded by: John Scheaffer

Member of the Pennsylvania House of Representatives from the Cumberland County district
- In office 1963–1968

Personal details
- Born: July 1, 1913 Harrisburg, Pennsylvania, U.S.
- Died: July 23, 2004 (aged 91) Allison Park, Pennsylvania, U.S.
- Party: Republican

Lourene Walker George Barto (July 1, 1913 – July 23, 2004), born Lourene Senseman Walker, was a Republican member of the Pennsylvania House of Representatives from 1963 to 1970. She was the first woman to represent Harrisburg in the state legislature.

== Early life and education ==
Lourene Walker was born in Harrisburg, Pennsylvania, the daughter of Lloyd Myers Walker and Sara Romaine Senseman Walker. Her father worked for the railroad. She graduated from New Cumberland High School and trained for a nursing career at Germantown Hospital School of Nursing. "I always wanted to be a doctor but that took too much money and my brother was studying to be a dentist so I took the nursing field," she recalled in 2003.

== Career ==
George was a nurse anesthetist at Carlisle Hospital, and president of the Pennsylvania State Association of Nurse Anesthetists. After her husband died from a heart attack in 1962, ran for his seat in the Pennsylvania House of Representatives, and won, becoming the first woman to represent Harrisburg in the legislature. She served almost four terms before she was defeated in the primaries in 1970. She was the first woman to serve on the state's Fish and Game Commission.

George worked in the Pennsylvania Department of Welfare after 1970, and was a leader of the Cumberland County League of Republican Women.

Members of the Pennsylvania legislature attended a 90th birthday celebration for Barto at her retirement home in 2003, and presented her with citations for her service to the state, and letters of congratulations from governor Ed Rendell, Supreme Court justice Sandra Day O'Connor, and several members of Congress.

== Personal life ==
Walker married twice. Her first husband, businessman and legislator Arthur George, died in 1962. Her second husband was physician Robert Barto; he died in 1992. She died in 2004, at the age of 91, in Allison Park, Pennsylvania.
