= John D. Payne =

American politician

Member of the Pennsylvania House of Representatives from the 106th district
- In office January 7, 2003 – January 3, 2017
- Preceded by: Frank Tulli, Jr.
- Succeeded by: Tom Mehaffie

Personal details
- Born: October 22, 1950 (age 75) Hershey, Pennsylvania
- Party: Republican
- Education: Harrisburg Area Community College; University of Maryland
- Website: www.reppayne.com

John D. Payne is an American politician who served as a Republican member of the Pennsylvania House of Representatives for the 106th District and was elected in 2002. Payne served on the House Liquor Control, Local Government, and Tourism and Recreational Development Committees.

== Career ==
Prior to his tenure as a state representative, Payne was Derry Township supervisor for 10 years, two of which he was chairman. He was a member of the Derry Township Sewer Authority for 10 years and served as chairman in 1998. He also served on the Derry Township Library Board for five years.

He is currently a warden for the state Forestry Department, where he has served for 35 years.

== Major Richard Winters ==
Payne conducted an interview about the life of Hershey resident Richard Winters and the events chronicled in Band of Brothers.

== Personal ==
Payne graduated from Hershey High School and later attended Harrisburg Area Community College and Maryland Fire and Rescue Institute at the University of Maryland to become a certified fire protection specialist.

Payne and his wife live in Hummelstown and have four grown children and three grandchildren.
