= Anita Kulik =

American politician (born 1964)

Member of the Pennsylvania House of Representatives from the 45th district
- Incumbent
- Assumed office January 3, 2017
- Preceded by: Nick Kotik

Personal details
- Born: Anita Astorino Kulik; May 5, 1964 (age 62) Carnegie, Pennsylvania, U.S.
- Party: Democratic

Anita Astorino Kulik (born May 5, 1964) is an American politician who has served in the Pennsylvania House of Representatives from the 45th district since 2017.

== Formative years ==
Born in Pittsburgh, Pennsylvania on May 5, 1964, Kulik graduated from Bishop Canevin High School in 1982, earned her Bachelor of Arts degree in history from Duquesne University in 1986, and then earned her Juris Doctor from Duquesne in 1989.

== Legal and public service career ==
During the early years of her legal career, she worked as a law clerk for the Pennsylvania Court of Common Pleas in Allegheny County and then as a law clerk for the Superior Court of Pennsylvania. A practicing attorney for roughly fifteen years, she represented victims of domestic violence and other clients involved in seeking protection from abuse.

She was also employed as a law instructor.

Subsequently elected as a commissioner in Kennedy Township, Allegheny County, she served in that public service capacity from 2003 to 2016. She was then hired as a legislative assistant to Pennsylvania State Representative Nicholas Kotik, and subsequently succeeded him when she was elected as a Democrat to the Pennsylvania House of Representatives for the 2017 term. She has since been reelected to the House to serve three additional consecutive terms.

In February 2017, she was part of a group of educators and legislators from Pennsylvania that traveled to the Caribbean region to explore ways to improve relations between Havana, Cuba and the Commonwealth of Pennsylvania and between Cuba and the United States. In July of that same year, she authored House Bill 1652 to include pet care arrangements as part of areas for judicial consideration during divorce proceedings, explaining, "This bill would ease one facet of the difficult divorce process by giving judges the ability to recognize the emotional attachment [litigants] have to our pets, as well as the well-being of a companion animal when determining its custody and care."

In May 2019, Kulik reintroduced legislation requiring that the well-being of pets be addressed as part of divorce settlement negotiations whenever the litigants involved are pet owners. Introduced as House Bill 1432, it proposed that judges be required to address six conditions when designating a litigant as the most appropriate guardian of the animal:

- When the pet was acquired (before or during the marriage);
- What the pet's daily needs are;
- Which of the litigants has traditionally been responsible for the pet's veterinary care;
- Which of the litigants has traditionally provided the animal with most of its socialization; and
- Which of the litigants bought and maintained the dog's license and typically manages other local and state regulatory compliance issues.

== Committee assignments ==
- Game & Fisheries
- Liquor Control
- Professional Licensure
- Veterans Affairs & Emergency Preparedness
