= Nick Kotik =

American politician

Member of the Pennsylvania House of Representatives from the 45th district
- In office January 7, 2003 – 2017
- Preceded by: Fred Trello
- Succeeded by: Anita Astorino Kulik

Personal details
- Born: 1950 (age 75–76) McKees Rocks, Pennsylvania
- Party: Democratic

Nickolas M. Kotik (born 1950) is a former Democratic member of the Pennsylvania House of Representatives.

Kotik holds a bachelor's degree in public administration from Indiana University of Pennsylvania. He spent over 20 years working for Allegheny County as a payroll accountant and property assessor. Kotik later worked as an aide to his predecessor, Representative Fred Trello, and as manager of Robinson Township.
