= Tom Mehaffie =

American politician

Member of the Pennsylvania House of Representatives from the 106th district
- Incumbent
- Assumed office January 3, 2017
- Preceded by: John D. Payne

Personal details
- Born: February 22, 1971 (age 55) Pitman, Pennsylvania, U.S.
- Party: Republican

Thomas L. Mehaffie III (born February 22, 1971) is an American politician who has served in the Pennsylvania House of Representatives from the 106th district since 2017.

Mehaffie currently sits on the Consumer Affairs, Game & Fisheries, Gaming Oversight, and Professional Licensure committees.

In February 2023, Republican House Leadership informed Mehaffie that he would no longer have an office within the House. This action follows Mehaffie's reluctance to sign a letter needed for a parliamentary maneuver to bring the House to a voting session, a move that required support from all 101 Republicans.
