= Daniel Fleck =

American politician

Daniel R. Fleck

Member of the Pennsylvania House of Representatives from the 43rd district
- In office 1981–1982
- Preceded by: James Knepper
- Succeeded by: Jere Schuler

Personal details
- Born: October 23, 1949 Oxnard, California, United States
- Died: March 3, 2011 (aged 61) Butler, Pennsylvania, United States
- Party: Republican

Daniel Robert Fleck (October 23, 1949 – March 3, 2011) was a Republican member of the Pennsylvania House of Representatives. He died of cancer in 2011.
