= Pennsylvania House of Representatives, District 58 =

American legislative district

Pennsylvania's 58th State House of Representatives district
Representative
| Eric Davanzo; R–Smithton |
- Population (2022): 64,556

The 58th Pennsylvania House of Representatives District is located in southwest Pennsylvania and has been represented by Eric Davanzo since 2020.

== District Profile ==
The 58th District is located in Westmoreland County and includes the following areas:

- East Huntingdon Township
- Hunker
- Madison
- Mount Pleasant
- Mount Pleasant Township (part)
  - District Bridgeport
  - District Duncan
  - District Heccla
  - District Spring Garden
- Monessen
- North Belle Vernon
- North Huntingdon Township (part)
  - Ward 03
  - Ward 04 (part)
    - Division 02
- Rostraver Township
- Scottdale
- Sewickley Township
- Smithton
- South Huntingdon Township
- Sutersville
- West Newton

== Representatives ==
| Representative | Party | Years | District home | Note |
Prior to 1969, seats were apportioned by county.
| James J. Manderino | Democrat | 1969 – 1989 | Monessen | Died on December 26, 1989 |
| Herman Mihalich | Democrat | 1990 – 1997 | | Died on September 9, 1997 |
| R. Ted Harhai | Democrat | 1998 – 2016 | Monessen | Elected on February 3, 1998 to fill vacancy |
| Justin Walsh | Republican | 2016 – 2019 | Rostraver | Resigned to run as a Westmoreland County judge |
| Eric Davanzo | Republican | 2020 – | Mt. Pleasant | Elected on March 16, 2020 to fill vancany |

== Recent election results ==
PA House election, 2024 Pennsylvania House, District 58
| Party | Candidate | Votes | % |
|---|---|---|---|
| Republican | Eric Davanzo (incumbent) | 25,276 | 69.18 |
| Democratic | Cherri Rogers | 11,258 | 30.82 |
| Total votes | | 36,534 | 100.00 |
| Republican hold | | | |

PA House election, 2022 Pennsylvania House, District 58
| Party | Candidate | Votes | % |
|---|---|---|---|
| Republican | Eric Davanzo (incumbent) | 17,527 | 63.23 |
| Democratic | Ken Bach | 10,192 | 36.77 |
| Total votes | | 27,719 | 100.00 |
| Republican hold | | | |

PA House election, 2020 Pennsylvania House, District 58
| Party | Candidate | Votes | % |
|---|---|---|---|
| Republican | Eric Davanzo (incumbent) | 20,591 | 63.21 |
| Democratic | Robert Prah, Jr. | 11,982 | 36.79 |
| Total votes | | 32,573 | 100.00 |
| Republican hold | | | |

PA House special election, 2020: Pennsylvania House, District 58
| Party | Candidate | Votes | % |
|---|---|---|---|
| Republican | Eric Davanzo | 4,269 | 52.58 |
| Democratic | Robert Prah, Jr. | 3,294 | 40.57 |
| Libertarian | Ken Bach | 556 | 6.85 |
| Total votes | | 8,119 | 100.00 |
| Republican hold | | | |

PA House election, 2018 Pennsylvania House, District 58
| Party | Candidate | Votes | % |
|---|---|---|---|
| Republican | Justin Walsh (incumbent) | 14,189 | 61.72 |
| Democratic | Mary Popovich | 8,802 | 38.28 |
| Total votes | | 22,991 | 100.00 |
| Republican hold | | | |

PA House election, 2016 Pennsylvania House, District 58
| Party | Candidate | Votes | % |
|---|---|---|---|
| Republican | Justin Walsh | 17,854 | 61.54 |
| Democratic | Mary Popovich | 11,159 | 38.46 |
| Total votes | | 29,013 | 100.00 |
| Republican hold | | | |
