= Pennsylvania House of Representatives, District 137 =

American legislative district

Pennsylvania's 137th State House of Representatives district
Representative
| Joe Emrick; R–Upper Nazareth Township |
- Population (2022): 65,856

The 137th Pennsylvania House of Representatives District is located in eastern Pennsylvania and has been represented since 2011 by Joe Emrick.

== District profile ==
The 137th Pennsylvania House of Representatives District is located in Northampton County. It is made up of the following areas:

- Bethlehem Township
- Hanover Township (Part)
  - District 05
- Lower Nazareth Township
- Nazareth
- Palmer Township (Part)
  - District Middle
  - District Upper Eastern
  - District Upper Western
  - District Western (PART, Division 02)
- Tatamy
- Upper Nazareth Township

== Representatives ==
| Representative | Party | Years | District home | Note |
Prior to 1969, seats were apportioned by county.
| Phillip S. Ruggiero | Democrat | 1969 – 1978 | | |
| Leonard Q. Gruppo | Republican | 1979 – 1998 | | |
| Richard Grucela | Democrat | 1999 – 2010 | Lower Mount Bethel Township | Retired prior to 2010 election |
| Joe Emrick | Republican | 2011 – present | | Incumbent |

== Recent election results ==
PA House election, 2022: Pennsylvania House, District 137
| Party | Candidate | Votes | % |
|---|---|---|---|
| Republican | Joe Emrick (incumbent) | 15,619 | 51.15 |
| Democratic | Anna Thomas | 14,916 | 48.85 |
| Total votes | | 30,535 | 100.00 |
| Republican hold | | | |

PA House election, 2020: Pennsylvania House, District 137
| Party | Candidate | Votes | % |
|---|---|---|---|
| Republican | Joe Emrick (incumbent) | 23,846 | 63.30 |
| Democratic | Katelind Brennan | 13,828 | 36.70 |
| Total votes | | 37,674 | 100.00 |
| Republican hold | | | |

PA House election, 2018: Pennsylvania House, District 137
| Party | Candidate | Votes | % |
|---|---|---|---|
| Republican | Joe Emrick (incumbent) | 14,200 | 55.26 |
| Democratic | Amy Cozze | 11,203 | 43.60 |
| Libertarian | Ed Reagan | 293 | 1.14 |
| Total votes | | 25,696 | 100.00 |
| Republican hold | | | |

PA House election, 2016: Pennsylvania House, District 137
| Party | Candidate | Votes | % |
|---|---|---|---|
| Republican | Joe Emrick (incumbent) | 20,039 | 65.58 |
| Democratic | Dave Mattei | 10,518 | 34.42 |
| Total votes | | 30,557 | 100.00 |
| Republican hold | | | |

PA House election, 2014: Pennsylvania House, District 137
| Party | Candidate | Votes | % |
|---|---|---|---|
| Republican | Joe Emrick (incumbent) | Unopposed | |
| Total votes | | 11,825 | 100.00 |
| Republican hold | | | |

PA House election, 2012: Pennsylvania House, District 137
| Party | Candidate | Votes | % |
|---|---|---|---|
| Republican | Joe Emrick (incumbent) | 19,378 | 61.37 |
| Democratic | Joseph Capozzolo | 12,200 | 38.63 |
| Total votes | | 31,578 | 100.00 |
| Republican hold | | | |

PA House election, 2010: Pennsylvania House, District 137
| Party | Candidate | Votes | % |
|---|---|---|---|
| Republican | Joe Emrick | 13,593 | 62.03 |
| Democratic | Charles Dertinger | 8,320 | 37.97 |
| Total votes | | 21,913 | 100.00 |
| Republican gain from Democratic | | | |
