= Bob Flick =

American politician (born 1944)

Robert J. Flick

Member of the Pennsylvania House of Representatives from the 167th district
- In office January 4, 1983 – November 30, 2006
- Preceded by: John Alden
- Succeeded by: Duane Milne

Personal details
- Born: October 27, 1944 (age 82) Bryn Mawr, Pennsylvania
- Party: Republican
- Spouse: Patricia
- Education: Villanova University; University of Pennsylvania
- Occupation: Legislator (retired)

Robert J. "Bob" Flick (born 1944) is an American politician and former Republican member of the Pennsylvania House of Representatives

He was first elected to represent the 167th legislative district in the Pennsylvania House of Representatives in 1982, succeeding retiring incumbent John Alden. During his tenure Flick sponsored legislation including a December 2001 law overhauling Pennsylvania's 39 job-training programs, and a 1995 educational reform law abolishing terminal and travel sabbatical leave for teachers in public schools and placing requirements on educational sabbaticals to enhance teaching skills. He was a leading advocate for welfare reform, writing a law to eliminate the “transitionally needy” category of general assistance which provided cash grants to able-bodied adults and implementing job-training, parental responsibility, and “workfare” programs. He also served as Pennsylvania Chairman of the American Legislative Exchange Council (ALEC). He retired prior to the 2006 elections. In 2007 it was revealed that Flick, as a lame duck legislator, attended legislative training trips at the public's expense after his retirement.
