= Pennsylvania House of Representatives, District 88 =

American legislative district

Pennsylvania's 88th State House of Representatives district
Representative
Sheryl M. Delozier; R–Lower Allen Township
- Population (2022): 64,646

The 88th Pennsylvania House of Representatives District is located in South Central Pennsylvania and has been represented since 2009 by Sheryl M. Delozier.

== District profile ==
The 88th District is located in Cumberland County and includes the following areas:

- Hampden Township
- Lower Allen Township (part)
  - Precinct 01
  - Precinct 03
  - Precinct 04
  - Precinct 05
  - Precinct 06
- Mechanicsburg
- New Cumberland
- Shiremanstown

== Representatives ==
Representative	Party	Years	District home	Note
Prior to 1969, seats were apportioned by county.
Lourene W. George	Republican	1969 – 1970		
John E. Scheaffer	Republican	1971 – 1980		
John Kennedy	Republican	1981 – 1988		
Jerry L. Nailor	Republican	1989 – 2008	Mechanicsburg	
Sheryl M. Delozier	Republican	2009 – present	Lower Allen	Incumbent

== Recent election results ==
PA House election, 2024: Pennsylvania House, District 88
Party	Candidate	Votes	%
Republican	Sheryl M. Delozier (incumbent)	20,882	55.15
Democratic	Sara Agerton	16,983	44.85
Total votes		37,865	100.00
Republican hold			

PA House election, 2022: Pennsylvania House, District 88
Party	Candidate	Votes	%
Republican	Sheryl M. Delozier (incumbent)	16,722	54.73
Democratic	Sara Agerton	13,832	45.27
Total votes		30,554	100.00
Republican hold			

PA House election, 2020: Pennsylvania House, District 88
Party	Candidate	Votes	%
Republican	Sheryl M. Delozier (incumbent)	21,344	58.09
Democratic	Tara Shakespeare	15,396	41.91
Total votes		36,740	100.00
Republican hold			

PA House election, 2018: Pennsylvania House, District 88
Party	Candidate	Votes	%
Republican	Sheryl M. Delozier (incumbent)	16,149	58.09
Democratic	Jean Foschi	11,651	41.91
Total votes		27,800	100.00
Republican hold			

PA House election, 2016: Pennsylvania House, District 88
Party	Candidate	Votes	%
Republican	Sheryl M. Delozier (incumbent)	20,518	65.10
Democratic	Christopher Cowan	11,001	34.90
Total votes		31,519	100.00
Republican hold			

PA House election, 2014: Pennsylvania House, District 88
Party	Candidate	Votes	%
Republican	Sheryl M. Delozier (incumbent)	Unopposed	
Total votes		16,716	100.00
Republican hold			

PA House election, 2012: Pennsylvania House, District 88
Party	Candidate	Votes	%
Republican	Sheryl M. Delozier (incumbent)	Unopposed	
Total votes		25,453	100.00
Republican hold			

PA House election, 2010: Pennsylvania House, District 88
Party	Candidate	Votes	%
Republican	Sheryl M. Delozier (incumbent)	Unopposed	
Total votes		19,822	100.00
Republican hold			
