= Fred Trello =

American politician (1929–2006)

Fred Anthony Trello, Sr.

Member of the Pennsylvania House of Representatives from the 45th district
- In office January 7, 1975 – November 30, 2002
- Preceded by: Max H. Homer
- Succeeded by: Nick Kotik

Personal details
- Born: November 14, 1929 Coraopolis, Pennsylvania
- Died: March 28, 2006 (aged 76) Coraopolis, Pennsylvania
- Party: Democratic
- Spouse: Elizabeth Trello
- Children: 3

Military service
- Allegiance: United States
- Branch/service: U.S. Air Force
- Battles/wars: Korean War

Fred Anthony Trello, Sr. (November 14, 1929 – March 28, 2006) was a Democratic member of the Pennsylvania House of Representatives.

== Biography ==
Born on November 14, 1929, Trello was a 1949 graduate of Coraopolis High School.

He served in the Korean War and earned a degree in 1951, from the Air Force Electronics School. He also earned a degree from Robert Morris College in 1957.

Trello got his start in politics as a Democratic County Committeeman for Coraopolis, Pennsylvania. He was first elected to represent the 45th legislative district in the Pennsylvania House of Representatives in 1974, a position he held until his retirement prior to the 2002 elections.

== Death ==
Trello died on March 28, 2006. He was survived by five grandchildren, namely, Sofia Muzzatti, Julia Muzzatti, Gia Trello, Dominic Trello, and Jaclyn Trello Keys.
