= Jere Schuler =

American politician (born 1934)

Jere W. Schuler

Member of the Pennsylvania House of Representatives from the 43rd district
- In office January 4, 1983 – November 30, 2002
- Preceded by: Daniel R. Fleck
- Succeeded by: Scott W. Boyd

Personal details
- Born: March 26, 1934 (age 92) Lancaster, Pennsylvania, U.S.
- Party: Republican
- Spouse: Renee G.
- Education: Millersville University; Temple University

Jere W. Schuler (born March 26, 1934) is an American former politician who was a Republican member of the Pennsylvania House of Representatives.

Schuler is a 1952 graduate of J. P. McCaskey High School. He earned a degree from Millersville University in 1956 and a M.Ed. degree from Temple University in 1962.

He was first elected to represent the 43rd legislative district in the Pennsylvania House of Representatives in 1982, a position he held until his retirement prior to the 2002 elections.
