= Pennsylvania House of Representatives, District 167 =

American legislative district

Pennsylvania's 167th State House of Representatives district
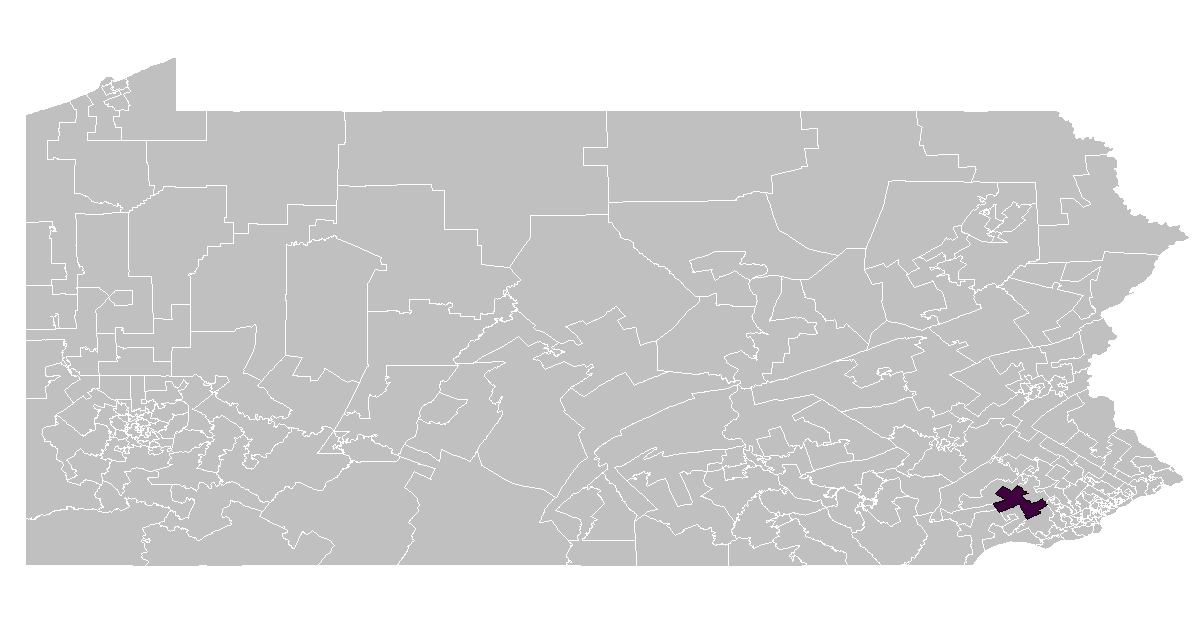
Representative
Kristine Howard; D–East Whiteland Township
- Demographics: 86.4% White; 3.1% Black; 3.2% Hispanic
- Population (2011) • Citizens of voting age: 62,591; 47,143

The 167th Pennsylvania House of Representatives District is in South Eastern Pennsylvania and has been represented by Kristine Howard since 2019.

== District profile ==
The 167th Pennsylvania House of Representatives District is located in Chester County and includes the following areas:

- Charlestown Township
- East Caln Township
- East Goshen Township (precincts 05 and 06)
- East Whiteland Township
- Malvern
- West Vincent Township
- West Pikeland Township
- West Whiteland Township

== Representatives ==
Representative	Party	Years	District home	Note
Prior to 1969, seats were apportioned by county.
Herbert K. Zearfoss	Republican	1969–1978		Retired
John Alden	Republican	1979–1982		Retired
Bob Flick	Republican	1983–2006	Malvern	Retired
Duane Milne	Republican	2007–2018	Willistown	Unsuccessful candidate for re-election.
Kristine Howard	Democrat	2019–	Malvern	Incumbent

== Recent election results ==
PA House election, 2010: Pennsylvania House, District 167
Party	Candidate	Votes	%
Republican	Duane Milne (incumbent)	14,819	57.08%
Democratic	Bill Holmes	9,263	35.68%
Independent	Joseph P Corrigan	1,866	7.19%
Total votes		25,962	100
Republican hold			

PA House election, 2012: Pennsylvania House, District 167
Party	Candidate	Votes	%
Republican	Duane Milne (incumbent)	20,822	58.48%
Democratic	Bob Broderick	14,781	41.52%
Total votes		35,603	100
Republican hold			

PA House election, 2014: Pennsylvania House, District 167
Party	Candidate	Votes	%
Republican	Duane Milne (incumbent)	13,439	61.39%
Democratic	Anne Crowley	8,453	38.61%
Total votes		21,892	100
Republican hold			

PA House election, 2016: Pennsylvania House, District 167
Party	Candidate	Votes	%
Republican	Duane Milne (incumbent)	20,623	56.57%
Democratic	Joe Denham	15,734	43.16%
Total votes		36,457	100
Republican hold			

PA House election, 2018: Pennsylvania House, District 167
Party	Candidate	Votes	%
Democratic	Kristine Howard	17,109	52.15%
Republican	Duane Milne (incumbent)	15,700	47.85%
Total votes		32,809	100
Democratic gain from Republican			
