= Herman Mihalich =

American politician

Member of the Pennsylvania House of Representatives from the 58th district
- In office 1990 – September 9, 1997
- Preceded by: James J. Manderino
- Succeeded by: Ted Harhai

Personal details
- Born: August 3, 1930
- Died: September 30, 1997 (aged 67)
- Party: Democratic

Herman Mihalich (August 3, 1930 – September 30, 1997) is a former Democratic member of the Pennsylvania House of Representatives.
