= Pennsylvania House of Representatives, District 45 =

American legislative district

Pennsylvania's 45th State House of Representatives district
Representative
Anita Astorino Kulik; D–Coraopolis
- Population (2022): 65,880

The 45th Pennsylvania House of Representatives District is located in southwest Pennsylvania and has been represented by Anita Astorino Kulik since 2016.

== District profile ==
The 45th District is located in Allegheny County and includes the following areas:

- Bridgeville
- Carnegie
- Collier Township
- Coraopolis
- Kennedy Township
- McKees Rocks
- Neville Township
- Pennsbury Village
- Robinson Township
- Stowe Township

== Representatives ==
Representative	Party	Years	District home	Note
Prior to 1969, seats were apportioned by county.
Max H. Homer	Democrat	1969 – 1974		
Fred A. Trello	Democrat	1975 – 2002		
Nick Kotik	Democrat	2003 – 2017	Robinson	
Anita Astorino Kulik	Democrat	2017 – Present	Kennedy	Incumbent

== Recent election results ==
PA House election, 2024: Pennsylvania House, District 45
Party	Candidate	Votes	%
Democratic	Anita Astorino Kulik (incumbent)	21,045	58.08
Republican	James Julius	15,192	41.92
Total votes		36,237	100.00
Democratic hold			

PA House election, 2022: Pennsylvania House, District 45
Party	Candidate	Votes	%
Democratic	Anita Astorino Kulik (incumbent)	18,222	63.35
Republican	Michael Pendel	10,540	36.65
Total votes		28,762	100.00
Democratic hold			

PA House election, 2020: Pennsylvania House, District 45
Party	Candidate	Votes	%
Democratic	Anita Astorino Kulik (incumbent)	22,853	61.71
Republican	Danny DeVito	14,180	38.29
Total votes		37,033	100.00
Democratic hold			

PA House election, 2018: Pennsylvania House, District 45
Party	Candidate	Votes	%
Democratic	Anita Astorino Kulik (incumbent)	Unopposed	
Total votes		20,981	100.00
Democratic hold			

PA House election, 2016: Pennsylvania House, District 45
Party	Candidate	Votes	%
Democratic	Anita Astorino Kulik (incumbent)	Unopposed	
Total votes		29,949	100.00
Democratic hold			
