= Gary Day (politician) =

American politician

Member of the Pennsylvania House of Representatives from the 187th district
- Incumbent
- Assumed office December 2024
- Preceded by: Ryan Mackenzie
- In office January 2024 – December 2026
- Preceded by: Ryan Mackenzie
- Succeeded by: Rachel Cuevas

Personal details
- Born: Baltimore, Maryland, U.S.
- Party: Republican
- Education: Pennsylvania State University
- Website: staterepgaryday.com

Gary Day is an American politician who represented the 187th Legislative District of Pennsylvania from 2012-2022 and again from 2024-2026. His district includes communities of northwestern and west-central Lehigh County.

== Career ==
Prior to being elected to the Pennsylvania General Assembly, Day was the director of marketing and human resources for Service Electric Cablevision. He served as an executive assistant to Republican Allentown mayor William Heydt from 1994 to 2001. He has also served as a member of the YMCA board of directors, founding member of the Lehigh Valley Sportsfest, executive director of the Allentown Advancement Team, and executive committee member of the Allentown Economic Development Corporation.

== Personal ==
Day holds a bachelor's degree in economics with a minor in business from Penn State University. He and his wife have three children and are members of the Saint Joseph the Worker Church. They reside in Lehigh County.
