= John Alden (politician) =

American politician (1942–1990)

Member of the Pennsylvania House of Representatives from the 167th district
- In office January 2, 1979 – November 30, 1982
- Preceded by: Herbert Zearfoss
- Succeeded by: Bob Flick

Personal details
- Born: December 15, 1942 Darby, Pennsylvania, U.S.
- Died: June 6, 1990 (aged 47) San Diego, California, U.S.
- Party: Republican
- Spouse: Anna Lou Kesselman
- Education: Villanova University (BA, JD)

John Clifton Alden (December 15, 1942 – June 6, 1990) was a Republican member of the Pennsylvania House of Representatives.

== Formative years ==
Alden was born in Darby, Pennsylvania on December 15, 1942.

== Career ==
Alden served as a Republican member of the Pennsylvania House of Representatives from January 2, 1979, to November 30, 1982. He was born in Darby, Pennsylvania.

== Family ==
In May 1982, one of Alden's three daughters, fourteen-year-old Denise, was found fatally shot in his law office; her death was later ruled a suicide. Her death was ultimately ruled accidental. He did not seek re-election to the House that year, and was succeeded by fellow Republican Bob Flick.

== Later life and death ==
Alden moved to San Diego, California, where he began many small businesses. He never returned to public service prior to his death from colon cancer on June 6, 1990. He was survived by two daughters: Jennifer (1973) and Jaclyn (1979–2009).
