= Pennsylvania House of Representatives, District 106 =

American legislative district

Pennsylvania's 106th State House of Representatives district
Representative
Tom Mehaffie; R–Lower Swatara Township
- Population (2022): 66,872

The 106th Pennsylvania House of Representatives District is located in South Central Pennsylvania and has been represented since 2017 by Republican Tom Mehaffie.

== District profile ==
The 106th Pennsylvania House of Representatives District is located in Dauphin County. It includes the unincorporated community of Hershey. It is made up of the following areas:

- Conewago Township
- Derry Township
- East Hanover Township
- Hummelstown
- Londonderry Township
- Lower Swatara Township (PART)
  - District 01
  - District 02
  - District 04
- Middletown
- Royalton
- South Hanover Township

== Representatives ==
Representative	Party	Years	District home	Note
Prior to 1969, seats were apportioned by county.
Rudolph Dinnini	Republican	1969 – 1990		
Frank Tulli, Jr.	Republican	1991 – 2002		
John D. Payne	Republican	2003 – 2016	Hummelstown	
Tom Mehaffie	Republican	2017 – present	Lower Swatara Township	Incumbent

== Recent election results ==
PA House election, 2024: Pennsylvania House, District 106
Party	Candidate	Votes	%
Republican	Tom Mehaffie (incumbent)	23,615	62.84
Democratic	Anju Singh	13,855	36.87
Total votes		37,580	100.00
Republican hold			

PA House election, 2022: Pennsylvania House, District 106
Party	Candidate	Votes	%
Republican	Tom Mehaffie (incumbent)	Unopposed	
Total votes		21,985	100.00
Republican hold			

PA House election, 2020: Pennsylvania House, District 106
Party	Candidate	Votes	%
Republican	Tom Mehaffie (incumbent)	19,283	53.57
Democratic	Lindsay Drew	16,714	46.43
Total votes		35,997	100.00
Republican hold			

PA House election, 2018: Pennsylvania House, District 106
Party	Candidate	Votes	%
Republican	Tom Mehaffie (incumbent)	14,513	54.58
Democratic	Jill Linta	12,079	45.42
Total votes		26,592	100.00
Republican hold			

PA House election, 2016: Pennsylvania House, District 106
Party	Candidate	Votes	%
Republican	Tom Mehaffie	Unopposed	
Total votes		21,916	100.00
Republican hold			

PA House election, 2014: Pennsylvania House, District 106
Party	Candidate	Votes	%
Republican	John Payne (incumbent)	Unopposed	
Total votes		14,727	100.00
Republican hold			

PA House election, 2012: Pennsylvania House, District 106
Party	Candidate	Votes	%
Republican	John Payne (incumbent)	18,768	64.77
Democratic	Osman Kamara	10,210	35.23
Total votes		28,978	100.00
Republican hold			
