= Joseph Corpora =

American politician

Joseph Corpora III

Member of the Pennsylvania House of Representatives from the 136th district
- In office 1995–1998
- Preceded by: Robert L. Freeman
- Succeeded by: Robert L. Freeman

Personal details
- Born: September 25, 1962 (age 63) Phillipsburg, New Jersey, United States
- Party: Democratic

Joseph A. Corpora III (born September 25, 1962) is a former Democratic member of the Pennsylvania House of Representatives.
