= Ted Harhai =

American politician

R. Ted Harhai

Member of the Pennsylvania House of Representatives from the 58th district
- In office 1998–2016
- Preceded by: Herman Mihalich
- Succeeded by: Justin Walsh

Personal details
- Born: January 23, 1955 (age 71)
- Party: Democratic
- Occupation: Politician

Robert Ted Harhai (born January 23, 1955) is a former Democratic member of the Pennsylvania House of Representatives. He was first elected on February 3, 1998.
