= Paul Semmel =

American politician

Paul W. Semmel

Member of the Pennsylvania House of Representatives from the 187th district
- In office January 4, 1983 – November 30, 2006
- Preceded by: Norman S. Berson
- Succeeded by: Carl W. Mantz

Personal details
- Born: November 6, 1939 (age 86) Schnecksville, Pennsylvania, U.S.
- Party: Republican
- Spouse: Nancy J.
- Children: 3 children
- Education: Penn State University
- Occupation: Legislator-Dairy Farmer-Educator

Paul W. Semmel (born November 6, 1939) is a former Republican member of the Pennsylvania House of Representatives.

He is a 1957 graduate of Parkland High School in Allentown, Pennsylvania. He earned a degree in agricultural education from Penn State University in 1961. He completed some graduate work at Temple University.

Prior to elective office, he worked as a teacher in the Catasauqua Area School District for 15 years. He is owner of the Excelsior Dairy Farm in Schnecksville, Pennsylvania.
