= Richard Grucela =

American politician

Member of the Pennsylvania House of Representatives from the 137th district
- In office January 5, 1999 – January 4, 2011
- Preceded by: Leonard Gruppo
- Succeeded by: Joe Emrick

Personal details
- Born: April 26, 1946 (age 80) Easton, Pennsylvania
- Party: Democratic

Richard T. Grucela (born April 26, 1946) is a Democratic former member of the Pennsylvania House of Representatives.
