= Pennsylvania House of Representatives, District 187 =

American legislative district

Pennsylvania's 187th State House of Representatives district
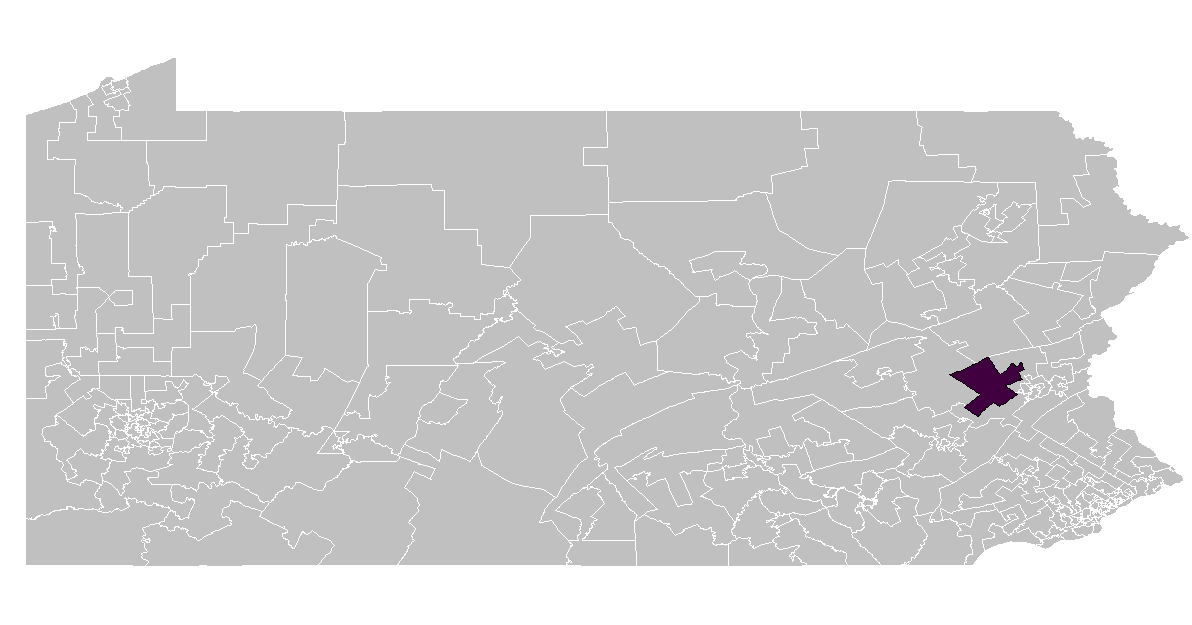
Representative
Rachel Cuevas –Heidelberg Township, Lehigh County
- Demographics: 92.0% White; 2.0% Black; 3.5% Hispanic
- Population (2011) • Citizens of voting age: 63,903; 49,608

The 187th Pennsylvania House of Representatives District is located in eastern Pennsylvania and has been represented since 2026 by Rachel Cuevas.

== District profile ==
The 187th Pennsylvania House of Representatives District is located in Lehigh County and includes the following areas:

- Alburtis
- Macungie
- Heidelberg Township
- Lower Macungie Township
- Lynn Township
- Upper Macungie Township (Part, District 03, 07, and 08)
- Washington Township
- Weisenberg Township

== Representatives ==
Representative	Party	Years	District home	Note
Prior to 1969, seats were apportioned by county.
Norman S. Berson	Democrat	1969 – 1982		
District moved from Philadelphia County to Bucks & Lehigh Counties after 1982, adjusted to Berks & Lehigh after 1992
Paul W. Semmel	Republican	1983 – 2006		
Carl W. Mantz	Republican	2007 – 2008		
Gary Day	Republican	2009 – 2022		Defeated in primary after 2022 redistricting
Ryan Mackenzie	Republican	2023 – 2024		Left to run for Congress
Gary Day	Republican	2025 – Present		Incumbent

== Recent election results ==
PA House election, 2010: Pennsylvania House, District 187
Party	Candidate	Votes	%	±%
Republican	Gary Day	14,725	70.01	
Democratic	Richard Stine	6,308	29.99	
Margin of victory		8,417	40.02	
Turnout		21,033	100.0	

PA House election, 2012: Pennsylvania House, District 187
Party	Candidate	Votes	%	±%
Republican	Gary Day	19,015	63.12	▼6.89
Democratic	Joseph Haas	11,111	36.88	
Margin of victory		7,904	26.24	▼13.78
Turnout		30,126	100.0	

PA House election, 2014: Pennsylvania House, District 187
Party	Candidate	Votes	%	±%
Republican	Gary Day	13,045	100.0	
Margin of victory				
Turnout		13,045	100.0	

PA House election, 2016: Pennsylvania House, District 187
Party	Candidate	Votes	%	±%
Republican	Gary Day	29,870	100.0	
Margin of victory				
Turnout		29,870	100	

PA House election, 2018: Pennsylvania House, District 187
Party	Candidate	Votes	%	±%
Republican	Gary Day	16,018	59.3	
Democratic	Michael Blichar Jr.	10,972	40.7	
Margin of victory		TBD	TBD	
Turnout		26,990	TBD	

PA House election, 2026: Pennsylvania House, District 187
Party	Candidate	Votes	%	±%
Democratic	Rachel Cuevas	15,581	51.1	+7.1
Republican	Gary Day	14,904	48.9	−6.3
Margin of victory		677	2.2	8.5
Turnout		30,485	61.5	
