= Frank Tulli =

American politician

Frank Tulli, Jr.

Member of the Pennsylvania House of Representatives from the 106th district
- In office January 1, 1991 – November 30, 2002
- Preceded by: Rudolph Dinnini
- Succeeded by: John D. Payne

Personal details
- Born: October 29, 1944 (age 81) Harrisburg, Pennsylvania
- Party: Republican
- Spouse: Meredith E.
- Education: Lebanon Valley College; Temple University

Frank "Chick" Tulli, Jr. (born October 29, 1944) is a former Republican member of the Pennsylvania House of Representatives.

== Biography ==
Tulli is a 1962 graduate of Hershey High School and a 1966 graduate of Lebanon Valley College. He earned an M.S. degree from Temple University in 1969.

Prior to elective office, he taught government in public schools for seven years and owned and operated a chain of Naturalizer shoe stores.

He was first elected to represent the 106th legislative district in the Pennsylvania House of Representatives in 1990. The leading legislative force behind the deregulation of Pennsylvania's electric utility industry, Tulli retired in May 2002, shortly after winning the Republican nomination in the 2002 primary election.

He is currently the chief executive officer at Greenlee Partners, a Harrisburg-based lobbying group.
