= Pennsylvania House of Representatives, District 136 =

American legislative district

Pennsylvania's 136th State House of Representatives district
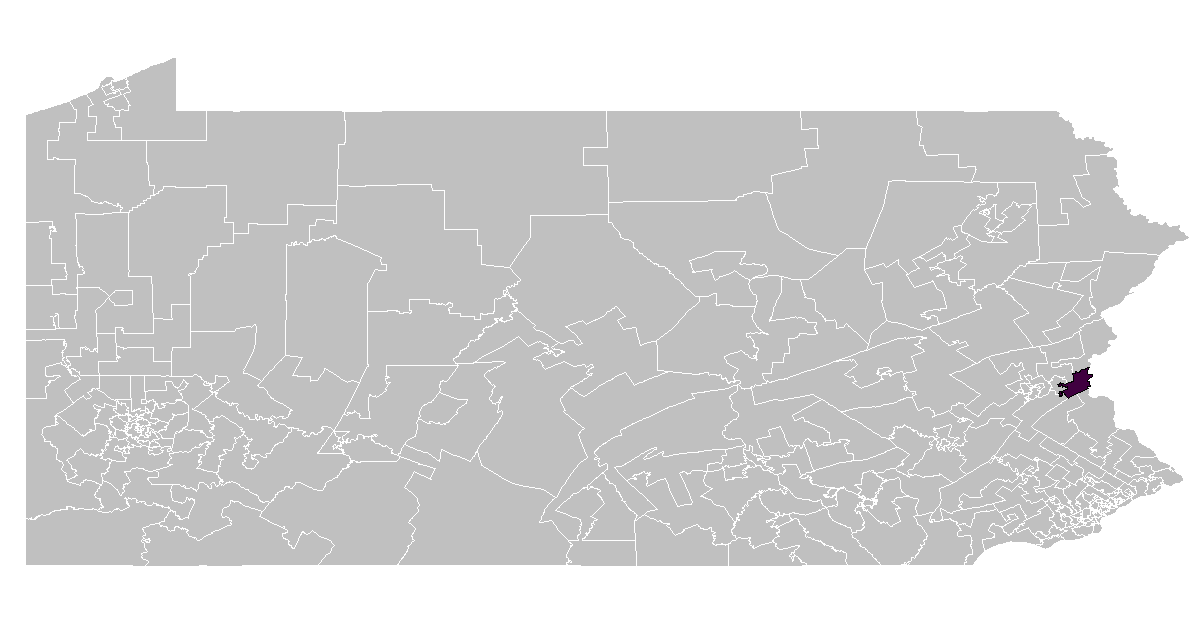
Representative
Robert L. Freeman; D–Easton
- Demographics: 79.5% White; 9.6% Black; 12.6% Hispanic
- Population (2011) • Citizens of voting age: 63,762; 49,593

The 136th Pennsylvania House of Representatives District is located in eastern Pennsylvania and has been represented since 1999 by Robert L. Freeman.

== District profile ==
The 136th Pennsylvania House of Representatives District is located in Northampton County. The district includes Lafayette College in Easton. It includes the following cities, townships, and census-designated-places:

- Easton
- Freemansburg
- Glendon
- Hellertown
- Lower Saucon Township (Part, Districts 03, 05, and 06)
- Palmer Township (Part)
  - District Eastern
  - District Western [PART, Division 01]
- West Easton
- Williams Township
- Wilson

== Representatives ==
Representative	Party	Years	District home	Note
Prior to 1969, seats were apportioned by county.
James F. Prendergast	Democrat	1969 – 1978		
Edmund J. Sieminski	Republican	1979 – 1982		
Robert L. Freeman	Democrat	1983 – 1994	Easton	
Joseph Corpora III	Democrat	1995 – 1998		
Robert L. Freeman	Democrat	1999 – present	Easton	Incumbent

== Recent election results ==
PA House election, 2010: Pennsylvania House, District 136
Party	Candidate	Votes	%	±%
Democratic	Robert L. Freeman	9,976	64.20	
Republican	Ron Shegda	5,562	35.80	
Margin of victory		4,414	28.40	
Turnout			100	

PA House election, 2012: Pennsylvania House, District 136
Party	Candidate	Votes	%	±%
Democratic	Robert L. Freeman	17,359	100	
Margin of victory		17,359	100	
Turnout		17,359	100	

PA House election, 2014: Pennsylvania House, District 136
Party	Candidate	Votes	%	±%
Democratic	Robert L. Freeman	9,131	100	
Margin of victory		9,131	100	
Turnout		9,131	100	

PA House election, 2016: Pennsylvania House, District 136
Party	Candidate	Votes	%	±%
Democratic	Robert L. Freeman	18,345	100	
Margin of victory		18,345	100	
Turnout		18,345	100	
