= Pennsylvania House of Representatives, District 43 =

American legislative district

Pennsylvania's 43rd State House of Representatives district
Representative
Keith Greiner; R–Upper Leacock Township
- Population (2022): 64,434

The 43rd Pennsylvania House of Representatives District is located in southern Pennsylvania and has been represented since 2013 by Republican Keith Greiner.

== District profile ==
The 43rd Pennsylvania House of Representatives District is located in Lancaster County and includes the following areas:

- Akron
- Earl Township
- Ephrata
- Ephrata Township
- Leacock Township
- Leola
- New Holland
- Upper Leacock Township
- West Earl Township

== Representatives ==
Representative	Party	Years	District home	Note
Prior to 1969, seats were apportioned by county.
George K. Haudenshield	Republican	1969 – 1970		
James W. Knepper, Jr.	Republican	1971 – 1980		
Daniel R. Fleck	Republican	1981 – 1982		
District moved from Allegheny County to Lancaster County after 1982
Jere W. Schuler	Republican	1983 – 2002		
Scott W. Boyd	Republican	2003 – 2012	West Lampeter Township	Did not seek re-election
Keith Greiner	Republican	2013 – present	Upper Leacock Township	Incumbent

== Recent election results ==
PA House election, 2024: Pennsylvania House, District 43
Party	Candidate	Votes	%
Republican	Keith Greiner (incumbent)	Unopposed	
Total votes		23,834	100.00
Republican hold			

PA House election, 2022: Pennsylvania House, District 43
Party	Candidate	Votes	%
Republican	Keith Greiner (incumbent)	Unopposed	
Total votes		18,511	100.00
Republican hold			

PA House election, 2020: Pennsylvania House, District 43
Party	Candidate	Votes	%
Republican	Keith Greiner (incumbent)	Unopposed	
Total votes		27,324	100.00
Republican hold			

PA House election, 2018: Pennsylvania House, District 43
Party	Candidate	Votes	%
Republican	Keith Greiner (incumbent)	15,692	62.42
Democratic	Jennie Porter	9,448	37.58
Total votes		25,140	100.00
Republican hold			

PA House election, 2016: Pennsylvania House, District 43
Party	Candidate	Votes	%
Republican	Keith Greiner (incumbent)	19,557	66.96
Democratic	Steven Elliott	9,649	33.04
Total votes		29,206	100.00
Republican hold			
