= Leonard Gruppo =

American politician

Leonard Q. Gruppo

Member of the Pennsylvania House of Representatives from the 137th district
- In office 1979–1998
- Preceded by: Phillip Ruggiero
- Succeeded by: Richard Grucela

Personal details
- Born: October 6, 1942 (age 83) Philadelphia, Pennsylvania
- Party: Republican

Leonard Q. Gruppo (born October 6, 1942) is a former Republican member of the Pennsylvania House of Representatives.
