= Robert L. Freeman =

American politician

Member of the Pennsylvania House of Representatives from the 136th district
- Incumbent
- Assumed office January 5, 1999
- Preceded by: Joseph Corpora III
- In office 1983–1994
- Preceded by: Edmund J. Sieminski
- Succeeded by: Joseph Corpora III

Personal details
- Born: March 9, 1956 (age 70) Easton, Pennsylvania, U.S.
- Party: Democratic
- Spouse: Terri Freeman
- Education: Moravian College (BA); Lehigh University (MA)
- Occupation: State Representative
- Website: Rep. Robert L. Freeman

Robert L. Freeman (born March 9, 1956) is a Democratic member of the Pennsylvania House of Representatives. He currently serves as the Democratic Chair of the House Local Government Committee. In 2003, the political website PoliticsPA named him as a possible successor to House Minority Leader Bill DeWeese.

== Awards ==
- 2023 Pennsylvania NewsMedia Association Advocate of the Year.
