= Jerry L. Nailor =

American politician

Member of the Pennsylvania House of Representatives from the 88th district
- In office January 3, 1989 – November 19, 2008
- Preceded by: John Kennedy
- Succeeded by: Sheryl M. Delozier

Personal details
- Born: July 27, 1946 (age 80) Mechanicsburg, Pennsylvania
- Party: Republican
- Spouse: Donna Nailor
- Education: Harrisburg Area Community College
- Website: www.repnailor.com

Jerry L. Nailor (born July 27, 1946) was a Republican member of the Pennsylvania House of Representatives, representing the 88th District from 1989 until his retirement in 2008, prior to the 2008 election and was succeeded by Republican Sheryl M. Delozier. He and his wife live in Mechanicsburg, Pennsylvania.
