= Manheim Township, Pennsylvania =

Manheim Township is the name of some places in the U.S. state of Pennsylvania:

- Manheim Township, Lancaster County, Pennsylvania
  - Manheim Township High School
  - Manheim Township School District
- Manheim Township, York County, Pennsylvania

== Other ==
- West Manheim Township, Pennsylvania
- North Manheim Township, Pennsylvania
- South Manheim Township, Pennsylvania
