= Marvin Miller (disambiguation) =

Marvin Miller (1917–2012) was an American labor economist and head of Major League Baseball Players Association.

Marvin Miller may also refer to:

- Marvin Miller (actor) (1913–1985), American voice-over character actor
- Marvin E. Miller Sr. (1927–1999), American journalist, editor and state legislator
- Marvin E. Miller Jr. (1945–2016), American state legislator, son of above
- Marvin Miller, the main character in the U.S. comic strip Marvin

== See also ==
- Miller (name)
