= Neffsville, Pennsylvania =

Unincorporated community in Pennsylvania, US

- Unincorporated community
- A Thanksgiving dinner in Neffsville in November 1942

- Location in Pennsylvania Location in the United States
- Coordinates: 40°06′00″N 76°18′20″W
- Country: United States
- State: Pennsylvania
- County: Lancaster
- Township: Manheim
- Time zone: UTC-5 (Eastern (EST))
  - Summer (DST): UTC-4 (EDT)
- ZIP Codes: 17601
- Area code: 717
- GNIS feature ID: 1182217

Neffsville is an unincorporated community in Manheim Township, Lancaster County, Pennsylvania, United States. As an unincorporated area, Neffsville has no formalized boundaries. The U.S. Geological Survey locates Neffsville at 40°6'0"N 76°18'20"W.

The retail and restaurant center of Neffsville is near 2500 Lititz Pike (Pennsylvania Route 501). Lancaster, the county seat, is 4.5 miles (7.2 km) to the south, and Lititz is 4 miles (6 km) to the north. Pennsylvania Route 722 leads west 3 miles (5 km) to East Petersburg and east 3 miles (5 km) to Pennsylvania Route 272 at Oregon.

Manheim Township School District serves 5,400 students with 637 employees, 423 of them holding teaching certificates. Manheim Township High School on School Road is considered to be in Neffsville.

== History ==
According to local tradition, Neffsville was named for the family of Johan Christian Neff, originally from Gerolsheim, Germany, who was aboard the ship Lydia when she arrived in Philadelphia on September 19, 1743. Neff moved to Lampeter Township in Lancaster County, married the former Frena Howery, and they had three children there - Christian in 1750, Henry in 1754, and Esther in 1757. All three married in Lancaster County, but Christian's life ended in Westmore County, and Esther's in Lebanon County. An elementary school on School Road was named for Henry Holt.

== Shank's extracts ==
Shank's Extracts bottle design predates 1923

Jacob Shank, a Neffsville pharmacist, introduced "Shank's Compound Flavoring of Vanilla Bean" in 1899 to improve the taste of his medicines. The product is still made today, and Shank's is now the second-largest primary vanilla supplier in North America, as well as supplying other extracts, flavorings and spices. The Shanks family sold the business in 1959, and it is no longer in Neffsville, but many collectors prize their old extract bottles that read "Shank's Extracts - Neffsville, Pa."

== Notable people ==
- Jim Furyk, professional golfer and holder of the record for lowest score (58) in a round
- Don Gehman, record producer
- Taylor Kinney, television actor, model
- Brad Rutter, second-winningest game show contestant in history

== In popular culture ==
Neffsville appears in the animated movie Free Birds.
