= Ben Mann =

American football player (born 2002)

No. 58 – New York Giants
- Position: Long snapper
- Roster status: Active

Personal information
- Born: July 6, 2002 (age 24); Lancaster, Pennsylvania, U.S.
- Listed height: 6 ft 5 in (1.96 m)
- Listed weight: 232 lb (105 kg)

Career information
- High school: Manheim Township (Manheim Township, Pennsylvania)
- College: Yale (2021–2024); Boston College (2025)
- NFL draft: 2026: undrafted

Career history
- New York Giants (2026–present)

Career NFL statistics as of Week 8, 2026
- Games played: 7
- Total tackles: 2
- Stats at Pro Football Reference

Ben Mann (born July 6, 2002) is an American professional football long snapper for the New York Giants of the National Football League (NFL). He played college football for the Yale Bulldogs and for the Boston College Eagles.

== Personal life ==
Mann is the grandson of NFL fullback Chuck Mercein.

== College career ==
=== Yale ===
Mann was the backup long snapper at Yale before becoming the starter in his final season there.

=== Boston College ===
Mann transferred to play for the Boston College Eagles.

== Professional career ==
Pre-draft measurables
Height	Weight	Arm length	Hand span	Wingspan	40-yard dash	10-yard split	20-yard split	20-yard shuttle	Three-cone drill	Vertical jump	Broad jump	Bench press
6 ft 4 3/8 in (1.94 m)	235 lb (107 kg)	31 1/2 in (0.80 m)	9 3/8 in (0.24 m)	6 ft 6 7/8 in (2.00 m)	5.00 s	1.64 s	2.80 s	4.38 s	7.42 s	36.5 in (0.93 m)	9 ft 11 in (3.02 m)	13 reps
All values from Pro Day

After not being selected in the 2026 NFL draft, Mann signed with the New York Giants as an undrafted free agent.

Ben Mann competed with incumbent long snapper Zach Triner during the 2026 offseason for the long snapping job. After a good showing during OTA’s, Mann won the job, shortly after the Giants released Zach Triner. Mann was one of the two undrafted free agents to make the Giants 53 man roster, alongside kicker Dominic Zvada. After Week 4, Mann had the highest percentage of perfect-spiral long snaps thus far in the season, at 100%.
