= Roy E. Baldwin =

American politician

Roy Eugene Baldwin, Jr.

Member of the Pennsylvania House of Representatives from the 97th district
- In office January 7, 2003 – November 30, 2006
- Preceded by: Jere L. Strittmatter
- Succeeded by: John C. Bear

Personal details
- Born: August 9, 1948 (age 78) Pennsylvania
- Party: Republican
- Spouse: Cynthia Laulani Baldwin
- Children: 3 children (including Andrew Baldwin)
- Education: Cornell University
- Occupation: Business Consultant
- Profession: Agricultural Engineer

Roy Eugene Baldwin, Jr. (born August 9, 1948) is a Republican former member of the Pennsylvania House of Representatives and father of The Bachelor star Andrew Baldwin.

== Family and formative years ==
Born in Pennsylvania on August 9, 1948, Baldwin has two brothers: Robert and Bill and a sister, Mary Baldwin Costello. He married Cynthia "Cindy" Laulani, a mathematics teacher. He has three children, two sons: Andy Baldwin, US Naval Officer, athlete and physician who starred in the reality show The Bachelor, Rob and a daughter Susie Baldwin.

Baldwin earned a degree in Agricultural Engineering from Cornell University.

== Career ==
Baldwin served as Township Supervisor of Manheim Township, Lancaster County, Pennsylvania for eight years. He was first elected to represent the 97th legislative district in the Pennsylvania House of Representatives in the 2002 election when he defeated upset Republican incumbent Jere L. Strittmatter in the Republican primary.
