= Pennsylvania House of Representatives, District 97 =

American legislative district

Pennsylvania's 97th State House of Representatives district
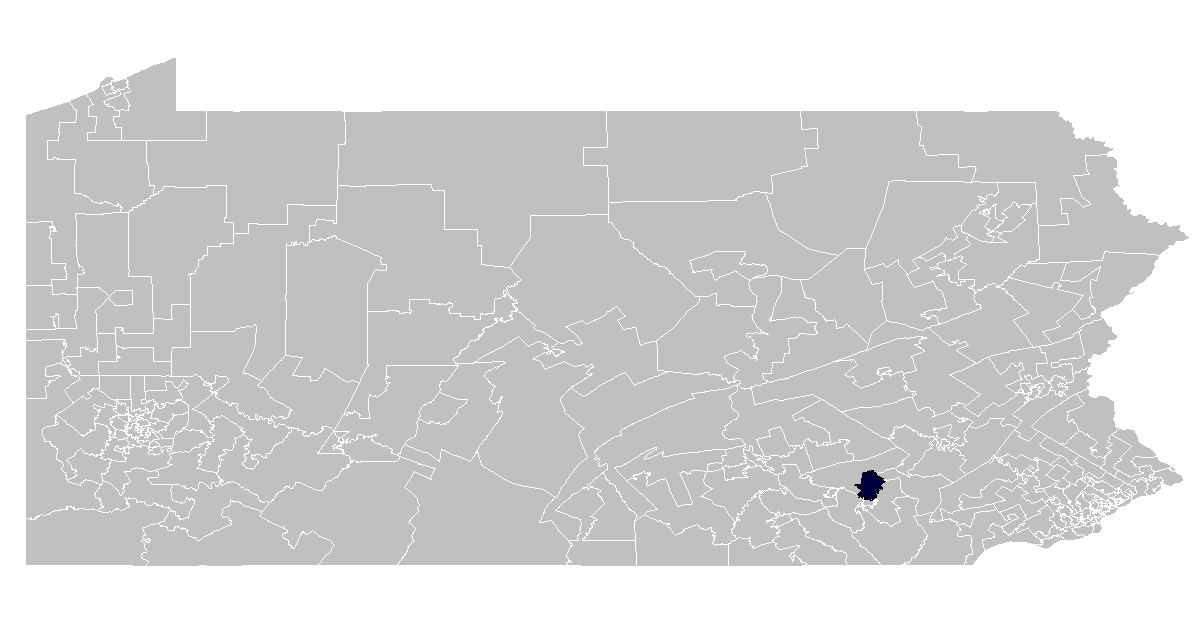
Representative
| Steven Mentzer; R–Manheim Township, Lancaster County |
- Demographics: 93.8% White; 2.3%% Black; 3.9%% Hispanic
- Population (2011) • Citizens of voting age: 66,456; 47,812

The 97th Pennsylvania House of Representatives District is located in Lancaster County. Steven Mentzer has represented the 97th district in the Pennsylvania House of Representatives since 2013.

== District Profile ==
District 97 includes the following areas:

- Lititz
- Manheim Township (PART, Districts 01, 02, 03, 04, 05, 06, 08, 09, 10, 11, 12, 13, 14, 15, 16, 17, 18, 19, 20, 21, 22, and 23)
- Warwick Township

Warwick Township has two bridges named to the National Register of Historic Places: The Buck Hill Farm Covered Bridge, and Zook's Mill Covered Bridge.

The 97th District is home to the town of Lititz; a small town voted "American's coolest town" in 2013.

U.S. Open Champion Jim Furyk won a Pennsylvania State Golf Championship while attending Maheim Township High School.

== Representatives ==
| Representative | Party | Years | District home | Note |
Prior to 1969, seats were apportioned by county.
| Marvin E. Miller, Sr. | Republican | 1969 – 1976 | | |
| June N. Honaman | Republican | 1977 – 1988 | | |
| Jere L. Strittmatter | Republican | 1989 – 2003 | Manheim Township | Lost Renomination on May 21, 2002 |
| Roy E. Baldwin | Republican | 2003 – 2007 | Manheim Township | Lost Renomination on May 16, 2006 |
| John C. Bear | Republican | 2007 – 2013 | Lititz | Withdrew prior to 2012 General Election |
| Steven Mentzer | Republican | 2013 – Present | Manheim Township | Incumbent |

== Recent election results ==
PA House election, 2010: Pennsylvania House, District 97
| Party | Candidate | Votes | % | ±% |
|---|---|---|---|---|
| Republican | John Bear | 17,993 | 72.2 | |
| Democratic | F. Patrick O'Keef | 6,919 | 27.8 | |
| Margin of victory | | 11,074 | 61 | |
| Turnout | | 24,912 | 100 | |

PA House election, 2012: Pennsylvania House, District 97
| Party | Candidate | Votes | % | ±% |
|---|---|---|---|---|
| Republican | Steven Mentzer | 25,071 | 100 | +27.8 |
| Margin of victory | | 25,071 | 100 | +39 |
| Turnout | | 25,071 | 100 | |

PA House election, 2014: Pennsylvania House, District 97
| Party | Candidate | Votes | % | ±% |
|---|---|---|---|---|
| Republican | Steven Mentzer | 14,746 | 64.5 | −35.5 |
| Democratic | Charles Hample | 8,117 | 35.5 | +35.5 |
| Margin of victory | | 6,629 | 44 | −66 |
| Turnout | | 22863 | 100 | |

PA House election, 2016: Pennsylvania House, District 97
| Party | Candidate | Votes | % | ±% |
|---|---|---|---|---|
| Republican | Steven Mentzer | 22,952 | 63.13 | −1.35 |
| Democratic | Charles Klein | 13,403 | 38.87 | +1.45 |
| Margin of victory | | 9549 | 41 | decrease |
| Turnout | | 36,355 | 100 | increase |

PA House election, 2018: Pennsylvania House, District 97
| Party | Candidate | Votes | % | ±% |
|---|---|---|---|---|
| Republican | Steven Mentzer | 18,469 | 56.6 | −6.53 |
| Democratic | Dana Hamp Gulick | 14,137 | 43.4 | +6.53 |
| Margin of victory | | 4332 | 13.2 | |
| Turnout | | 32,606 | 100 | |

PA House election, 2020: Pennsylvania House, District 97
| Party | Candidate | Votes | % | ±% |
|---|---|---|---|---|
| Republican | Steven Mentzer | 24,352 | 56.9 | +0.3 |
| Democratic | Dana Hamp Gulick | 18,466 | 43.1 | −0.3 |
| Margin of victory | | 5886 | 13.7% | +0.5 |
| Turnout | | 42,818 | 100 | |
