= Oregon, Pennsylvania =

Unincorporated community in Pennsylvania, US

Coordinates: 40°06′51″N 76°14′54″W

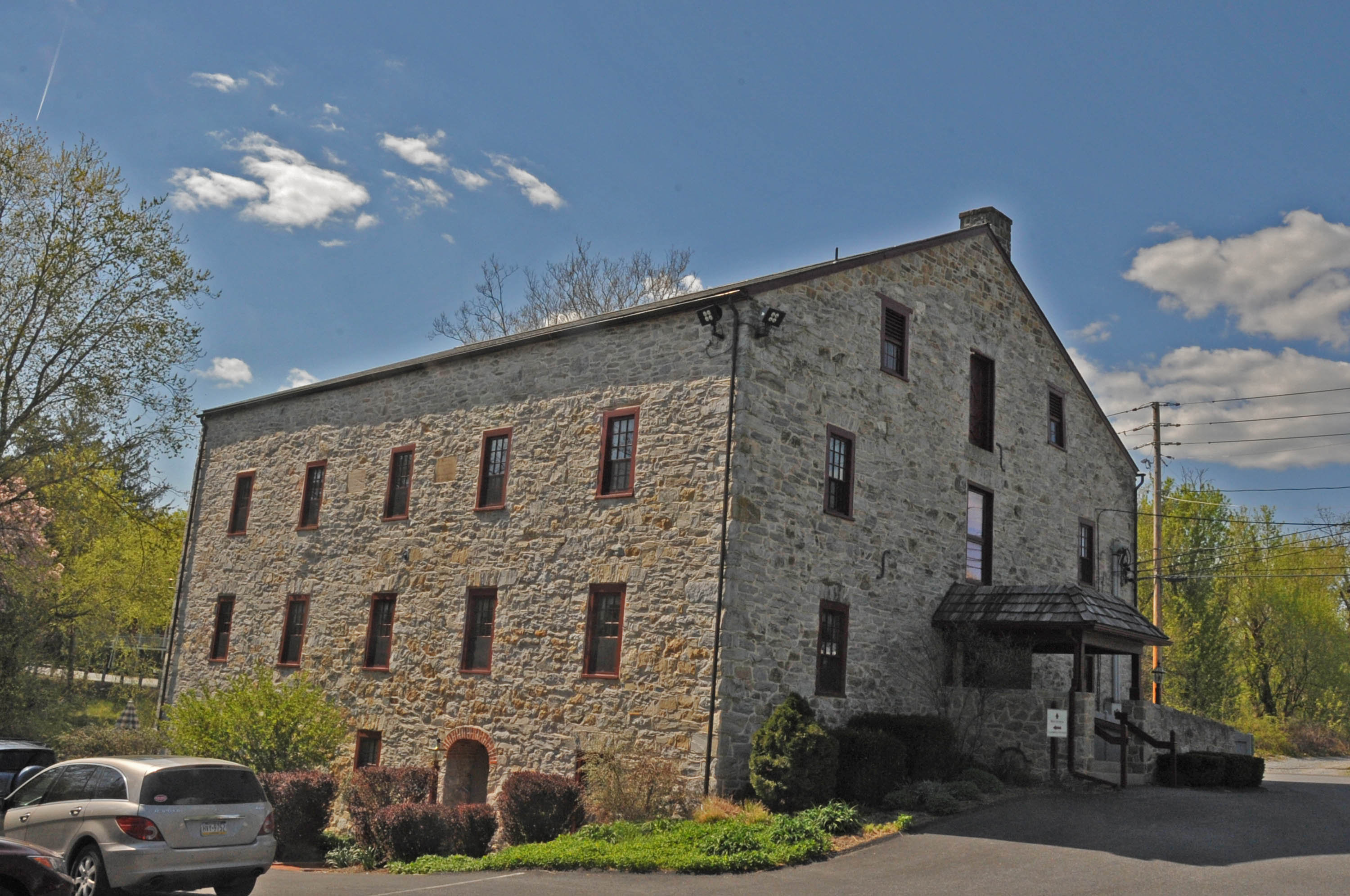
Oregon Mill

Oregon is an unincorporated community that is located in Manheim Township, Lancaster County, in the U.S. state of Pennsylvania. It is situated near the intersection of PA 722 and the Oregon Pike (PA 272, formerly U.S. 222), between Lancaster and Ephrata.

Lititz Run passes through the village and joins the Conestoga River by the former Pinetown lumber mill and covered bridge. There are a few dozen houses in the village and a handful of small businesses, not including the surrounding farms.

Oregon is served by Red Rose Transit Route 11.

== History ==
A post office called Oregon was established in 1846, and remained in operation until 1912. The community, formerly known as "Catfish", was renamed after the Oregon Territory.

Oregon was a significant center of commerce in this area of the county in the 1700s and 1800s, being the site of a large mill run by Jacob Bear, a tavern, and the neighboring Bushong's Mill at Pinetown. The location here of Bear's mill was the original reason for the construction of a road between Lancaster, Ephrata, and Reading in 1734 (known as the Oregon or Catfish Pike, after the village) and between Oregon and Gap.

A Mennonite meeting and schoolhouse was built in the village in 1792; there is also a United Methodist Church there that remains today. A large and historically significant "Great Meeting" occurred in the Isaac Long Barn outside Oregon in 1767, leading to the founding of the Evangelical United Brethren. This is commemorated by a historical marker.

The Oregon Dairy, Supermarket, and Restaurant opened in the village in 1974. A limited access highway for US 222, parallel to the old turnpike, was completed in 1977, causing significant alteration of the roads and landscape around Oregon.
