= Haines family murders =

2007 triple murder in Pennsylvania, U.S.

Coordinates: 40°5′29.3″N 76°18′41.4″W

- Date: May 12, 2007; 19 years ago
- Time: c. 2:20 a.m.
- Location: Manheim Township, Pennsylvania, United States
- Motive: Unknown
- Perpetrator: Alec Devon Kreider
- Casualties: Kevin Haines; Thomas Haines; Lisa Haines
- Convictions: First-degree murder (3 counts)
- Sentence: Three consecutive life sentences without the possibility of parole

On May 12, 2007, Alec Kreider, a 16-year-old high school student at the time, murdered his classmate and friend Kevin Haines, his father Thomas Haines, and mother Lisa Haines by stabbing them to death in their home in Manheim Township, Pennsylvania, United States. Kreider was arrested a month later on June 16 and charged with three counts of first degree murder. He pleaded guilty to all charges, and was subsequently sentenced to three consecutive life sentences without the possibility of parole.

== Background ==
=== Alec Kreider ===
Alec Devon Kreider was born on February 4, 1991, to Timothy Scot Kreider and Angela Parsons Kreider. His parents had divorced in 2002. Kreider lived with his mother and was a sophomore student at Manheim Township High School. He suffered from severe anger issues and tried to strangle his brother when he was younger.

=== Haines family ===
Thomas Alan Haines (age 50), an industrial-supplies salesman who worked in Lancaster, Lisa Ann Haines (née Brown, age 47), a preschool teacher at Lancaster Brethren Preschool, their daughter Margaret "Maggie" (age 20), a student at Bucknell University, and their son Kevin (age 16), a high school sophomore, lived in Manheim Township, Lancaster County, Pennsylvania. Kevin Haines was also a sophomore student at Manheim Township High School, where he was classmates with Kreider in German class, and according to a fellow student the two were "close buddies". Alec attended the family's memorial service on May 19, 2007.

== Murders, police response, and investigation ==
In the early hours of May 12, 2007, Maggie Haines, who was awakened by "sounds of struggle" in the middle of the night and "smelled blood", ran from the home and across the street to a neighbor who called 911 for help.

Kreider had entered the Haines' home without force sometime around 2 a.m., stabbing Thomas and Lisa in their sleep, killing Thomas by stabbing him once in the heart and severely wounding Lisa. Kreider then went to Kevin's room and killed him after a brief struggle, inflicting over two dozen cuts and stab wounds, before returning to slit Lisa's throat, killing her, then escaping before the police could arrive. Kreider also slashed Tom across his left leg. Miscommunication between the Haines' neighbor, the call-taker at 911, and the dispatcher caused extreme unnecessary delay in police response to an "unknown disturbance". The official timeline notes that it took the first responding officer nearly twelve minutes to arrive from a distance of four miles in the middle of the night with no traffic barriers. Police say this delay had no bearing on the survival of the victims.

The parents were found dead in their bedroom; Tom on the left side of the bed and Lisa laying down on the floor on the right side, while Kevin was found at the opposite end of the upstairs hallway on the floor outside his bedroom. According to police reports, bloody shoe prints led away from Kevin's body and into the parents' bedroom, and from there to the common upstairs bathroom, where a shoe print was found on the linoleum in front of the sink. Police presume the murderer attempted to clean up at the sink as blood was also found there. Bloody shoe prints appeared on lower carpeted steps as the perpetrator exited the house. Blood transfer was also found on the rear sliding glass door. Maggie Haines was not killed because Alec did not know that she was home from college at the time of the murders.

=== Investigation ===
The law enforcement investigation began around 2:40 a.m. The victims were declared dead shortly after 5 a.m. by deputy county coroners, and autopsies were performed two days later. The day after the murders, bloodhounds tracked "a strong scent of fear" along a path that led down the hill to PA Route 501 and north to an ice cream/fast food restaurant, where the trail vanished. Police presumed the perpetrator had a vehicle waiting and used it to escape. Upon Kreider's arrest, all information associated with the bloodhounds was dismissed, as it did not match law enforcement's new theory. The police explanation was that "the dogs made a mistake".

Kreider, along with other 150 Manheim Township High School students, was questioned a day after the killings. During the questioning, Kreider claimed to be best friends with Kevin and pointed out to authorities three students that allegedly picked on Kevin. On Monday May 14, during a public briefing, police chief Neil Harkins stated that the residents "should be concerned", and that there is "a killer out there in the community". He also advised residents to lock their doors. During the investigation, which was mainly led by the FBI, the entire neighborhood of Blossom Hill, where the Haines home was located, was "combed" over multiple times in search for any physical evidence. The authorities also went door-to-door to question the Haines' neighbours, and also searched the yards of nearby homes.

The nature of the crime itself was baffling enough for law enforcement; a multiple murder in a quiet and essentially crimeless neighbourhood, with no signs of forced entry or sexual assault. It was also revealed that nothing was taken from the home. On May 30, law enforcement concluded their final sweep of the Blossom Hill neighbourhood, and subsequently turned the Haines home over to the surviving members of the family. Around this time, the Lancaster County-Crime Stoppers established a hotline through which callers can give tips or information which could lead to a potential arrest of a killer or killers, with the reward posted at $1,000.

== Legal proceedings ==
After a month of intense national and regional media coverage and speculation, and the growing fear and panic of a potential serial killer on the loose, as well as an extensive search by Pennsylvania State Police cadets, Alec Kreider was arrested on June 16. Kreider's father, Timothy informed authorities that his son had confessed to the killings two days earlier. According to the probable cause affidavit, Kreider initially intended to kill only Kevin by smothering him to death. Since June 5, Kreider had been committed to the Philhaven Adolescent Inpatient Treatment facility after he had locked himself in his bedroom armed with a handgun and threatened to kill himself. Earlier that day, Kreider told his friend he wanted to commit suicide.

Although Kreider was not considered a suspect, prior to his arrest, law enforcement received an anonymous tip which stated that Kreider was "running around saying how he can get away with murder." On July 16, Kreider was arraigned. He pleaded guilty to three counts of first-degree murder. Kreider was given the maximum punishment; three consecutive life sentences without parole on June 17, 2008, at age 17. At his sentencing, a ten-minute video statement by Maggie Haines was played in court, during which she called Kreider a "despicable individual", and asked the judge to sentence Kreider to life in prison. When implored by the judge to reveal an explanation for the killings, Kreider replied: "There is none." His age at the time of the crime prevented him from being sentenced to death due to a U.S. Supreme Court ruling, Roper v. Simmons (2005).

Kreider's motive for the killings remains unclear, although according to an entry investigators found in his journal, he claims to have "despised happy people". A financial reward offered on behalf of the Haines family remained unclaimed.

== Aftermath ==
Pennsylvania Court of Common Pleas Judge David Ashworth denied Kreider's post-sentence challenge to his consecutive sentences, and the Superior Court of Pennsylvania affirmed Ashworth's denial. On December 8, 2009, Kreider filed a petition under Pennsylvania's Post-Conviction Collateral Relief Act (PCRA), which Judge Ashworth denied on June 15, 2010 without a scheduled hearing. An appeal to Pennsylvania Superior Court was later discontinued by Kreider. On November 3, 2010, Kreider's second PCRA petition was denied, again without a hearing. In July 2011, Kreider filed a third PCRA petition but withdrew it voluntarily a month later.

Following the landmark June 2012 Miller v. Alabama ruling by the U.S. Supreme Court which affirmed that a life sentence for juveniles convicted of homicide offenses violate the Eighth Amendment, on August 1, 2012, Kreider filed his fourth PCRA petition under Miller v. Alabama. However, on July 11, 2014, this petition was ultimately denied, as his fourth petition was cited "patently untimely", as under Commonwealth v. Abu-Jamal, the petitioner must file any PCRA petition within one year of the date his judgement of sentence becomes final; meaning the PCRA cannot apply retroactively.

In August 2014, Kreider filed another appeal, this time to withdraw his guilty plea and for a chance to be paroled. He claimed that he was pressured into pleading guilty by the "overzealous" District Attorney Craig Stedman, attaching a Lancaster Newspaper story in which Stedman said Kreider was "evil" and "beyond redemption" before Kreider's sentencing. He also disputed a claim made by Stedman that Kreider, while at Lancaster County Prison, told a fellow inmate that he would have raped and killed Maggie Haines had he known she was home that night. In the appeal, Kreider claimed that he was a "mere child", that he shouldn't be punished as an adult and that his father "had more input" in his guilty plea than he did. His appeal was denied a week later.

=== Suicide ===
On January 20, 2017, Kreider, aged 25, killed himself by hanging in his prison cell at SCI Camp Hill in Cumberland County, Pennsylvania, where he had been incarcerated since March 2015. He was found by prison staff and pronounced dead at 4:31 p.m.

At the time of his death, Kreider was among a group of Lancaster County juvenile offenders eligible for a resentencing hearing in view of the United States Supreme Court's 2012 decision in Miller v. Alabama that mandatory sentences of life in prison without the possibility of parole are unconstitutional for juvenile offenders, and the 2016 decision in Montgomery v. Louisiana that made Miller apply retroactively. The county had delayed scheduling these hearings, pending a Pennsylvania Supreme Court ruling in Commonwealth v. Batts.

== In media ==
The Haines family murders were the subject of the Season 3 premiere of Investigation Discovery's Unusual Suspects; the network revisited the case in a 2014 episode of its Nightmare Next Door series; and again in 2019 in an episode of its Evil Lives Here series. Author Michael W. Cuneo also wrote about the case in his true crime book A Need to Kill: Confessions of a Teen Killer. Alec Kreider's father, Tim Kreider, also wrote a book, Refuse to Drown, concerning his son's involvement in the killings and the emotional turmoil the Kreider family went through in the aftermath. The story was also covered in the A&E series Killer Kids in 2014. On October 9, 2023, Mr. Ballen covered the story on an episode of his podcast “MrBallen: Strange, Dark, and Mysterious.”
