= Mike Sturla =

American politician (born 1956)

P. Michael Sturla
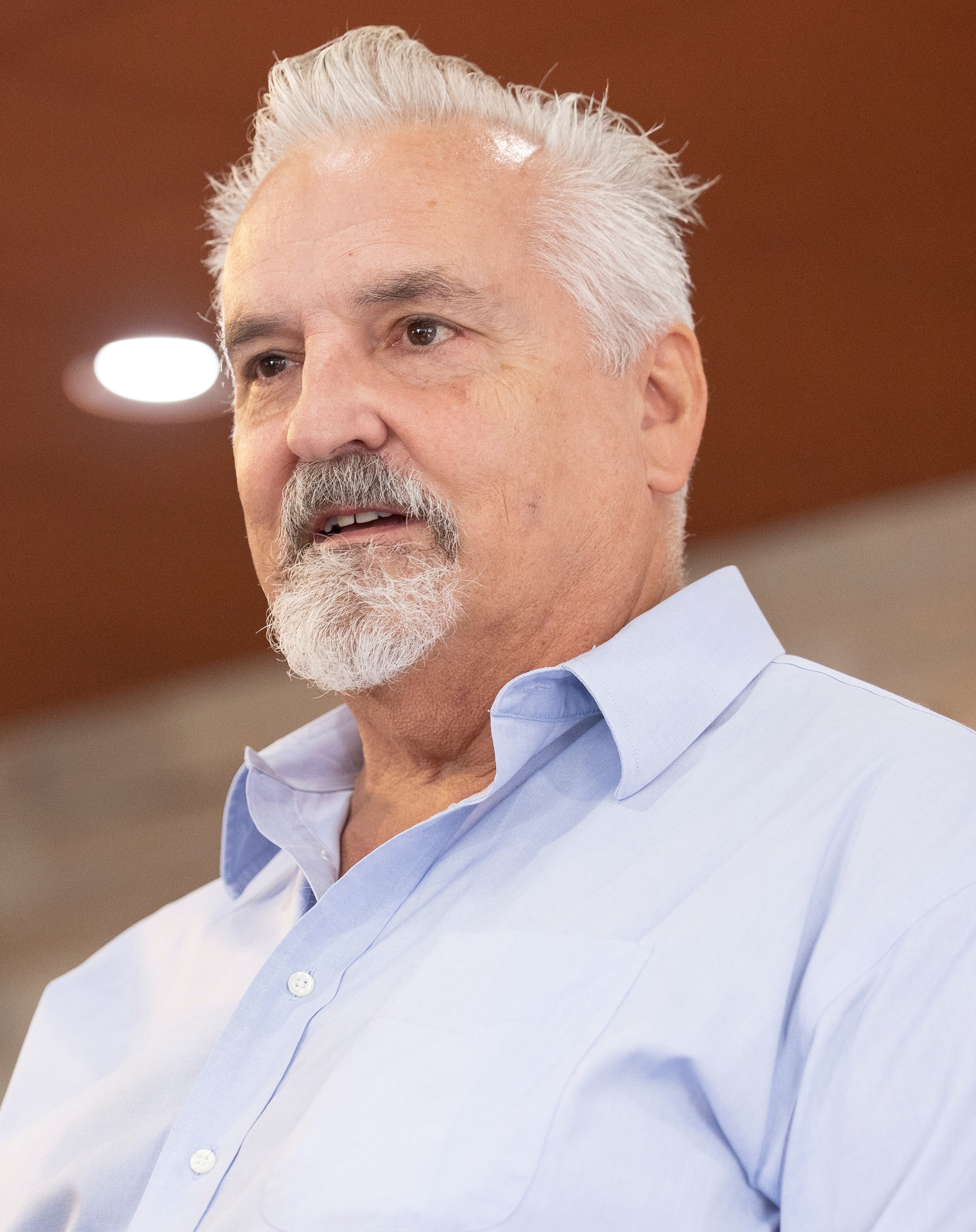

Member of the Pennsylvania House of Representatives from the 96th district
- In office January 1, 1991 – November 30, 2024
- Preceded by: Marvin E. Miller, Jr.
- Succeeded by: Nikki Rivera

Personal details
- Born: February 18, 1956 (age 70) Lancaster, Pennsylvania, U.S.
- Party: Democratic
- Education: University of Kansas
- Occupation: Legislator
- Website: http://www.pahouse.com/sturla

P. Michael Sturla (born February 18, 1956) is an American politician. He was a Democratic member of the Pennsylvania House of Representatives. He represented the 96th District in Lancaster County, including the city of Lancaster, Manheim Township and East Petersburg from 1991 to 2024. Sturla served as House Democratic Policy Committee Chair until 2020. He currently serves as the Democratic minority chair of the House Urban Affairs Committee.

For most of his tenure in the legislature, he was the only Democrat representing a significant portion of Lancaster County at the state or federal level.

== Biography ==
Sturla graduated from the University of Kansas in 1979 with a degree in environmental design. After college, he founded a painting and construction firm with his brother and later founded Aarchitrave, an architecture firm.

He was elected to the Lancaster City Council in 1987 and served on the Council until his election to the House.

In August 2011, Sturla stirred controversy with written remarks he made about proposed drilling in the Marcellus Shale regions of Pennsylvania. He wrote that increased drilling would lead to the "spread of sexually transmitted disease amongst the womenfolk." Sturla apologized for his "insensitive" remarks, but defended himself by saying that his comments were based on a report to the Marcellus Shale Advisory Commission.

Mike Sturla endorsed Tom Wolf in the 2014 Democratic Primary for Governor.

Sturla sat on the Urban Affairs committee.

On August 14, 2024, Sturla announced that he would not seek re-election, retiring at the end of his term.
