= Pennsylvania Route 722 =

State highway in Lancaster County, Pennsylvania, US

Pennsylvania Route 722

Route information
- Maintained by PennDOT
- Length: 8.820 mi (14.194 km)
- Existed: 1930–present

Major junctions
- West end: PA 283 in East Hempfield Township
- PA 72 in East Petersburg; PA 501 in Neffsville
- East end: PA 272 in Oregon

Location
- Country: United States
- State: Pennsylvania
- Counties: Lancaster

Highway system
- Pennsylvania State Route System; Interstate; US; State; Scenic; Legislative
← PA 718	→ PA 724

Pennsylvania Route 722 (PA 722) is an 8.8-mile-long (14.2 km), east–west state highway located in central Lancaster County, Pennsylvania. The western terminus is at an interchange with PA 283 in East Hempfield Township, where State Road continues westward toward Harrisburg Pike turning into Centerville Road upon crossing. The eastern terminus is at PA 272 in Oregon. PA 722 is a two-lane undivided road that passes through suburban areas to the north of Lancaster. The route intersects PA 72 in East Petersburg and forms a concurrency with PA 501 in Neffsville.

The road was paved west of East Petersburg by 1911 and east of there by 1926. PA 722 was designated by 1930 between U.S. Route 230 (US 230) in Bamford and US 222 and PA 772 in Brownstown. The eastern terminus was moved to its current location at US 222 (now PA 272) in the 1930s, with US 222 replacing the route east of there. The western terminus was moved to its current location following a realignment of US 230 in 1949. The western terminus was upgraded to an interchange in 1969 as part of improving PA 230 (which replaced US 230, now PA 283) to a freeway.

== Route description ==
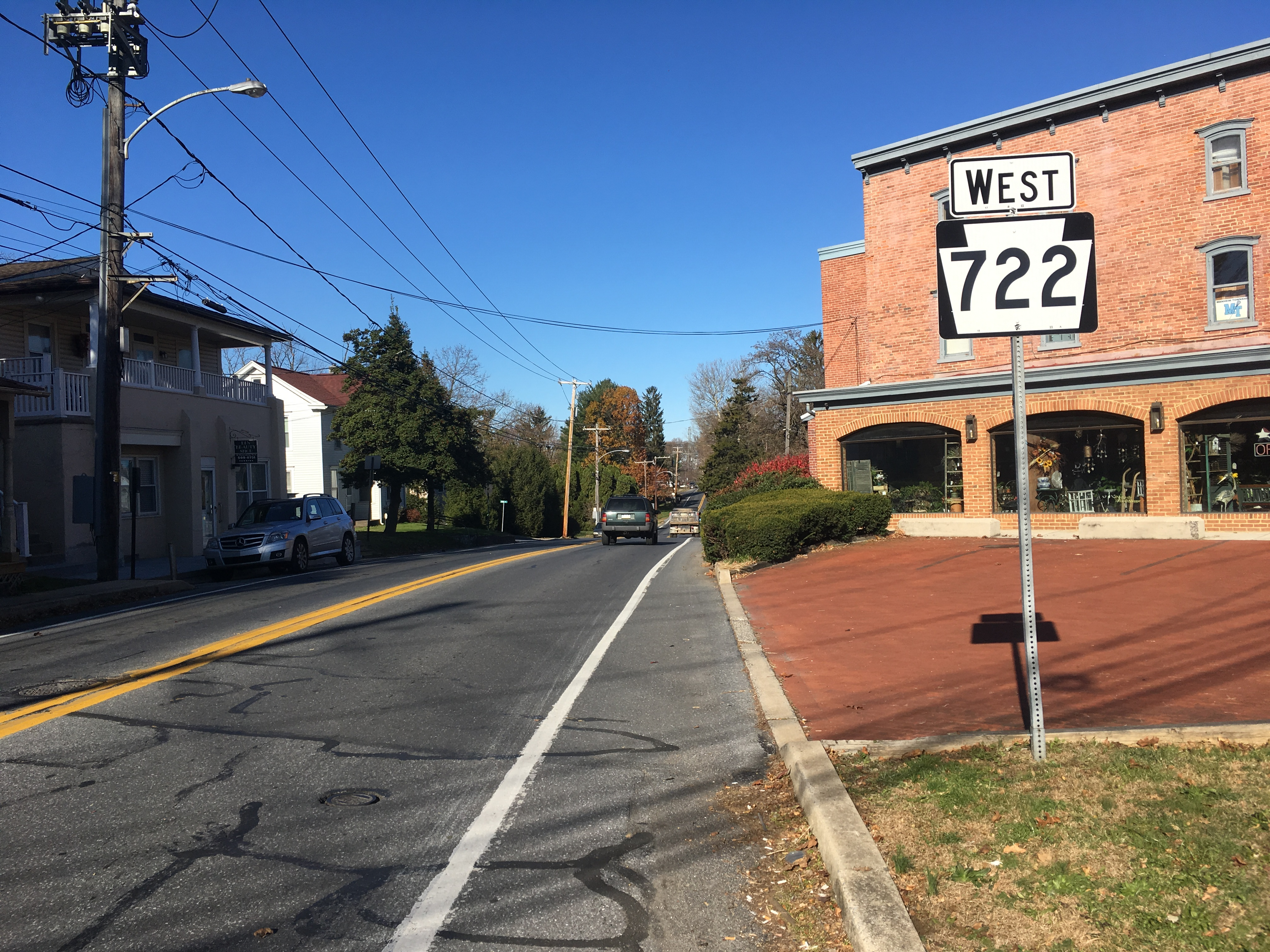
PA 722 westbound past PA 501 in Neffsville

PA 722 begins at an interchange with the PA 283 freeway in East Hempfield Township, Lancaster County, heading north on two-lane undivided State Road. South of this interchange, State Road continues as a local road. From PA 283, the route passes a couple businesses before heading into agricultural areas, turning to the east. The road crosses Norfolk Southern's Lititz Secondary railroad line at-grade and enters the borough of East Petersburg, where the name becomes State Street. PA 722 heads northeast through residential areas with some businesses, curving to the east and intersecting Lemon Street. A block later, the route crosses PA 72 in the center of East Petersburg. The road continues past homes and becomes Cottage Avenue, curving to the north and then to the northeast. PA 722 crosses the Little Conestoga Creek into Manheim Township and becomes Petersburg Road, winding east through suburban residential areas with some businesses and crossing Fruitville Pike. The route heads through Groffs Corner and passes to the south of a farm before turning southeast past more homes and reaching a junction with PA 501 in Neffsville.

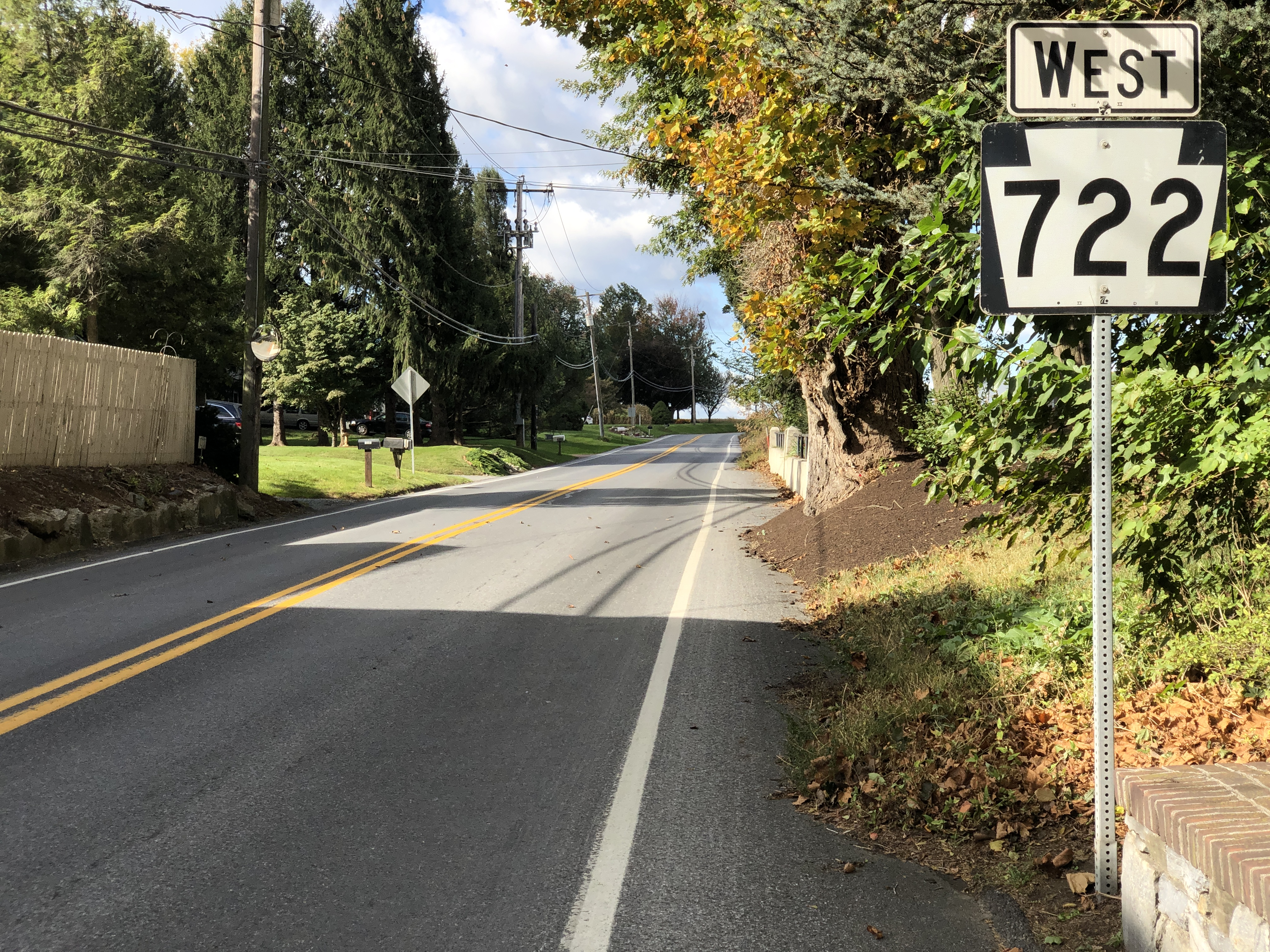
PA 722 westbound in Manheim Township

At this point, PA 722 turns north to form a concurrency with PA 501 on Lititz Pike, passing through suburban development. PA 722 splits from PA 501 by heading east along East Oregon Road, running through suburban neighborhoods. The road turns north and heads into industrial areas, where it bends east. The route continues through agricultural areas with a couple residential subdivisions to the south of the road. Farther east, PA 722 passes through the residential community of Oregon and crosses Lititz Run before it reaches its eastern terminus at an intersection with PA 272.

== History ==
When Pennsylvania first legislated routes in 1911, present-day PA 722 was not given a route number. At this time, the road was paved west of East Petersburg while the road between East Petersburg and Oregon was unpaved. By 1926, the road between East Petersburg and Oregon was paved. PA 722 was designated by 1930 to run from US 230 (Harrisburg Pike) in Bamford east to US 222 and the eastern terminus of PA 772 in Brownstown, heading north on State Road, east on its current alignment to Oregon, and northeast on Oregon Pike. In the 1930s, the eastern terminus of the route was cut back to US 222 (now PA 272) in Oregon, with US 222 replacing the route between Oregon and Brownstown. The western terminus of PA 722 was cut back to a realigned US 230 in 1949. In 1969, the intersection with PA 230 (which replaced US 230, now PA 283) was upgraded to an interchange as part of converting PA 230 to a freeway.

== Major intersections ==
The entire route is in Lancaster County.

Location	mi	km	Destinations	Notes
East Hempfield Township	0.000	0.000	PA 283 – Harrisburg, Lancaster	Interchange; western terminus
East Petersburg	1.796	2.890	PA 72 (Main Street)	
Manheim Township	4.819	7.755	PA 501 south (Lititz Pike)	West end of PA 501 overlap
Manheim Township	5.236	8.427	PA 501 north (Lititz Pike)	East end of PA 501 overlap
Manheim Township	8.820	14.194	PA 272 (Oregon Pike) – Akron, Lancaster	Eastern terminus
1.000 mi = 1.609 km; 1.000 km = 0.621 mi: Concurrency terminus
