= Shreiner Farm =

- U.S. National Register of Historic Places
- U.S. Historic district
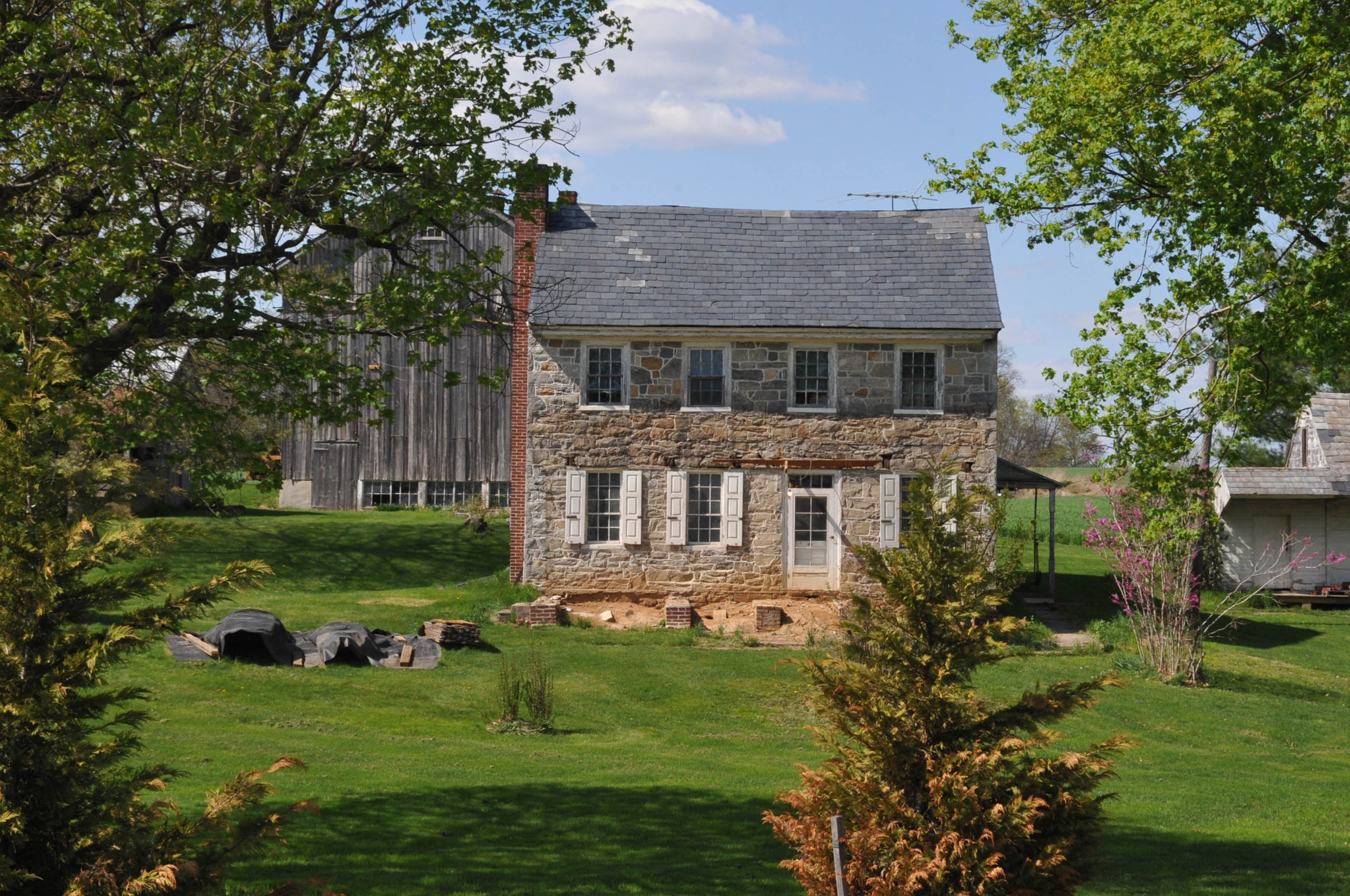
- Farmhouse

- Location within Pennsylvania Location within the United States
- Location: Oregon Pike N side, 0.3 mi. E of Suncrest Rd., Manheim Township, Pennsylvania
- Coordinates: 40°6′48″N 76°15′0″W
- Area: 52 acres (21 ha)
- Built: 1828
- Architectural style: Pennsylvania-style farmhouse
- MPS: Historic Farming Resources of Lancaster County MPS
- NRHP reference No.: 94001058
- Added to NRHP: August 30, 1994

The Shreiner Farm is an historic farm and national historic district that is located in Manheim Township, Lancaster County, Pennsylvania, United States.

It was listed on the National Register of Historic Places in 1994.

== History and architectural features ==
This district includes seven contributing buildings. They are a stone Pennsylvania style farmhouse, a stone Pennsylvania bank barn (1828), a frame tobacco barn (c. 1900), a frame and stone summer kitchen (c. 1830), and three frame sheds. The farmhouse was built circa 1830, and is a two-and-one-half-story, four-bay by two-bay, rectangular, fieldstone dwelling.
