= Neff Elementary School =

Neff Elementary School can refer to:

- Pat Neff Elementary School in Houston, Texas
- Neff Elementary School in Manheim Township, Lancaster County, Pennsylvania
- Neff Elementary School, a former school in Miamisburg City School District, Ohio
