= John Pittenger =

American lawyer and academic (1930–2009)

John C. Pittenger

Member of the Pennsylvania House of Representatives from the 96th district
- In office 1969–1970
- Preceded by: District created
- Succeeded by: Harold A. Horn

Member of the Pennsylvania House of Representatives from the Lancaster County district
- In office 1965–1968

Personal details
- Born: May 23, 1930 Philadelphia, Pennsylvania
- Died: December 6, 2009 (aged 79) Lancaster, Pennsylvania
- Party: Democratic

John C. Pittenger (May 23, 1930 – December 6, 2009) was an American lawyer, academic and former Democratic member of the Pennsylvania House of Representatives, serving two non-consecutive terms in the State House. He was appointed the Secretary of the Pennsylvania Department of Education from 1972 until 1976.

Pittenger served as the dean of the Rutgers University School of Law - Camden from 1981 until 1986.

== Biography ==
=== Early life ===
Pittenger was born in Philadelphia on May 23, 1930, to parents, Nicholas Otto and Cornelia VanDerveer Chapman Pittenger. He attended public school in the suburb of Swarthmore, Pennsylvania, before enrolling in Phillips Exeter Academy in Exeter, New Hampshire. He was a member of the Society of Friends, also known as the Quakers.

Pittenger graduated summa cum laude with a bachelor's degree in American history from Harvard University in 1951. Following his graduation from Harvard, Pittenger attended the London School of Economics as a Frank Knox Fellow. He simultaneously enlisted in the United States Army from 1952 until 1955, serving as a first lieutenant in the army's infantry and government intelligence units.

He earned his cum laude law degree from Harvard Law School in 1958.

== Career ==
Pittenger moved to Lancaster, Pennsylvania, in 1958 and practiced law in the city until 1965. He first joined the law firm, Barley, Snyder, Cooper, and Mueller, before establishing his own private law firm in Lancaster.

=== Pennsylvania House of Representatives ===
Pittenger served two non-consecutive terms in the Pennsylvania House of Representatives.

After becoming active in the Democratic Party, Pittenger was elected to the Pennsylvania House of Representatives, representing his district from 1965 to 1968. During his first term, Pittenger was the principal sponsor of the Mental Health/Mental Retardation Act of 1966 and drafted the bill for Pennsylvania Higher Education Assistance Agency scholarship program.

Pittenger was defeated for re-election to the Pennsylvania State House. Following his election loss, Pittenger worked as the director of research for the Democratic minority Caucus of the House of Representatives from 1967 to 1968.

However, he campaigned for and was re-elected to the Pennsylvania State House in the newly created 96th district, serving once again from 1969 until 1970. He served as a member of the Joint Legislative Data Processing Committee and the state Democratic Policy Committee.

Pittenger was the first member of the Pennsylvania General Assembly to have high school seniors serve as legislative pages in the state House of Representatives. He advocated for increased powers for the Pennsylvania Board of Education. Pittenger also supported a controversial bill which would have charged graduated tuition for students at the colleges of the Pennsylvania State System of Higher Education based on income.

=== Legislative Secretary ===
Pittenger became a member of the Commission on School Finance after leaving the Pennsylvania House of Representatives in 1970. Pennsylvania Governor Milton J. Shapp appointed Pittenger as his legislative secretary, as well as the liaison between the governor and Pennsylvania Department of Education in January 1971.

Pittenger helped to guide Pennsylvania's first personal income tax bill through the Pennsylvania General Assembly as legislative secretary. He shepherded a successful bill which created the Pennsylvania Department of Environmental Resources. He also guided reforms to the Workmen's Compensation and Unemployment Compensation Acts.

=== Secretary of Education ===
Governor Shapp appointed Pittenger as the Secretary of the Pennsylvania Department of Education in 1972.

Pittenger established the state government internship program for in-state college students and the Pennsylvania Governor's School for the Arts.

He championed mandated equal athletic programs for female athletes in Pennsylvania public schools. Pittenger guided the first complete rewrite and modernization of the Pennsylvania school code in more than thirty years. He also supported the adoption of achievement and attitudinal testing for students in fifth, eighth and eleventh grade.

Pittenger also served as the chairman of the National Council of Chief State School Officers for three years.

=== Later political career and academia ===
Pittenger resigned as Pennsylvania Secretary of Education in 1976 in order to take a position as a visiting professor at the Harvard Graduate School of Education. He remained at Harvard as a visiting lecturer from January 1977 until June 1978.

He returned to Pennsylvania state government in 1978 when then Pennsylvania House Speaker K. Leroy Irvis recruited Pittenger as the chairman of a commission to reform the House of Representatives. The final report issued by Pittenger's committee led to the formation of the Bi-Partisan Management Committee.

In 1979, Pittenger announced his candidacy for the Democratic nomination for the United States Senate seat being vacated by Republican Richard Schweiker. However, he withdrew from the Democratic primary race in 1980 after Pittsburgh Mayor Pete Flaherty announced his intention to seek the seat as well. Republican Arlen Specter went on to narrowly defeat Flaherty in the 1980 Senate election.

Pittenger was appointed as the dean of Rutgers School of Law–Camden in 1981. Under Pittenger, the law school added programs specializing in international law and taxation. He persuaded Rutgers to build its first dormitory at the Camden campus and introduced a law faculty exchange program with Karl Francis University in Graz, Austria.

Pittenger resigned as dean of Rutgers in 1986 and moved to his family's Pittwillow Farm in Chester County, Pennsylvania. He continued to teach law at Rutgers until his official retirement in 1994. In 1982, Pittenger won the Judge Edward Finch prize from the American Bar Association for the outstanding Law Day speech.

He was appointed to the Pennsylvania State Board of Education from 1991 until 1996.

Pittenger also worked as the pre-law advisor and adjunct professor of government at Franklin & Marshall College in Lancaster, Pennsylvania, during parts of his career. He also worked as F&M's first squash coach in the college's history.

Among his many works, Pittenger authored his memoir, Politics Ain't Beanbag and co-authored a high school textbook on constitutional law titled The Pursuit of Justice with Henry W. Bragdon.

He moved to Homestead Village, a retirement community in Lancaster, in 1997, but remained active in Democratic politics. The Lancaster County Democratic Committee awarded him with its first ever Lifetime Achievement Award in 2003.

He died of complications from Parkinson's disease at Homestead Village in Lancaster, Pennsylvania, on December 6, 2009, at the age of 79. Pittenger was survived by his wife, Pauline Miller Pittenger; stepsons, Josiah Leet and Matthew Leet; and his sister, Jane Kellenberger.

A memorial service attended by more than 300 people, including Pennsylvania Governor Ed Rendell, was held at Franklin & Marshall College's Barshinger Center on January 13, 2010. The service was moved from the college's smaller Nevin Chapel to accommodate the large number of attendees.
