= Manheim Township High School =

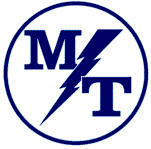

Location
- 115 Blue Streak Blvd; Manheim Township, Lancaster County, Pennsylvania 17601; United States; 40°06′10″N 76°17′57″W

Information
- Type: Public high school
- Motto: Nurture and Challenge for Success
- Established: 1949
- Status: Currently operational
- Locale: Suburb: Large (21)
- School district: Manheim Township School District
- NCES District ID: 4214580
- CEEB code: 392865
- NCES School ID: 421458002623
- Dean: Matthew Johns
- Head of school: David Rilatt
- Faculty: 122.30 (on an FTE basis)
- Grades: 9–12
- Enrollment: 1,953
  - Grade 9: 473
  - Grade 10: 519
  - Grade 11: 468
  - Grade 12: 493
- Student to teacher ratio: 15.97
- Colors: Blue and white
- Mascot: Blue Streak and Sir Streaksalot the Lion
- Rival: Hempfield High School
- Newspaper: The Township Times
- Website: http://www.mtwp.net

Manheim Township High School (MT) is a public high school in Manheim Township, Lancaster County, Pennsylvania, United States.

== History ==
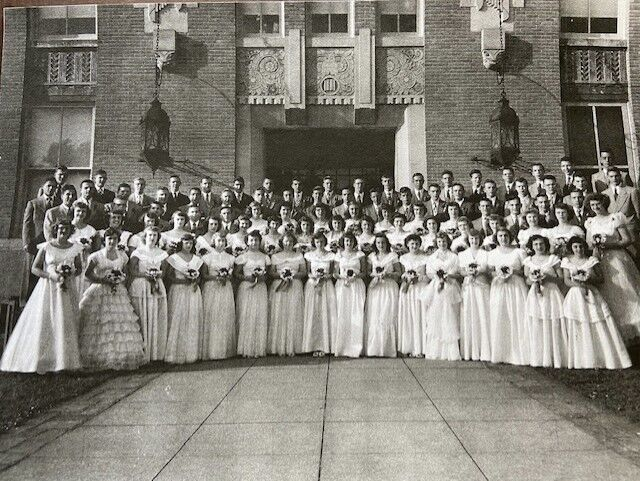
First graduates of Manheim Township High School in 1949

Manheim Township High School's first building was by architect Henry Y. Shaub. Construction began in 1928 at 17 School Road.

The school catered to white students from 7-12th grades, graduating its first class of 86 students in 1949. Integration did not occur until after the Supreme Court's 1954 Brown vs Board of Education ruling.

Once the community's educational needs exceeded MT's capacity, the school relocated to its current 115 Blue Streak Boulevard building in 1978. MT's first building was repurposed for students of many grade levels.

Manheim Township School District approved a $83 million renovation in 2006. The plan called for removal or renovation of the school's 1970s-era buildings, and the addition of a new three-story wing of classrooms. Renovations were completed in December 2008. MTSD also approved renovations of the indoor pool and convocation hall, which were untouched by the 2006 renovation.

== Academics ==
Students must follow the standards set by the Pennsylvania Department of Education. The standards state a student must complete 22 credit hours to graduate in the following areas:

- English - 4 credits
- Social Studies - 4 credits
- Arts and Humanities - 1 credit
- STEM - 7 credits
- Health - 1/2 credit
- Physical Education - 1 1/2 credits
- Financial Literacy - 1/2 credit
- Elective courses - 3 1/2 credits

For a student between 7-11th grades to be considered on track toward graduation, they must carry a minimum of 6 credits each semester, with a maximum of 7 credits. If a student is not on track, they may exceed the 7 credit maximum with discretion of MT staff.

Students on track for graduation in 12th grade may reduce their courseload to 5 credits. Also, a 12th grade student can have 1 of the 5 credits scored as a 'Pass/Fail' by petitioning the guidance counselor and principal. 'Pass/Fail' courses do not affect the student's overall grade point average.

== Athletics ==
Manheim Township High School is a member of the Pennsylvania Interscholastic Athletic Association (PIAA), adhering to Title IX, District 3 class 6A. It competes in the Lancaster-Lebanon League (L-L League). Blue Streak student athletes can participate in varsity, junior varsity, and freshmen-only teams.

- Baseball
- Basketball (boys and girls)
- Beach volleyball (boys and girls)‡
- Cheer (girls and coed)
- Cross country (boys and girls)†
- Football
- Golf (boys and girls)†
- Lacrosse (boys and girls)
- Soccer (boys and girls)
- Softball
- Swim and dive (boys and girls)†
- Tennis (boys and girls)‡
- Track and field (boys and girls)†
- Volleyball (boys and girls)‡
- Wrestling (boys and girls)
- † denotes individual and team sports
- ‡ denotes individual, doubles, and team sports

Sports are funded by the school, and additional funds are raised through boosters creating 501(c)(3) non-profit organization, donations, and tax credits.

== Other extracurricular teams ==
=== Academic team ===
The school has a Quiz Bowl team, which won a national championship in 2000. The team also won a Pennsylvania state championship in 2022.

=== Marching band ===
Manheim Township High School Marching Band joined five other high schools to become a non-competitive band. Competitions were then based on an evaluation scale, which would not result in a ranking amongst other schools.

== Campus ==
Manheim Township High School is in an assemblage of buildings offering educational services from kindergarten to 12th grade. The building complex includes Neffsville Elementary School, Landis Rub Intermediate School, and Manheim Township Middle School.

Sporting facilities are in the Manheim Township Athletic Complex in the southern portion of the MTHS campus. The largest facility is named Gene Kruis Field, after the hall-of-fame MT football coach who amassed a 142-55-5 record over a 26-year tenure; it accommodates football, track and field, marching band, and other large events. The field underwent an upgrade, converting from natural grass to artificial turf, in 2025. The track surrounding the field was also resurfaced into the traditional red and white colors.

Other MT Athletic Complex facilities include baseball diamonds, soccer pitches, and field hockey and lacrosse fields.

== Notable alumni ==
- Deb Andraca, Wisconsin state legislator
- Andrew Baldwin, Episode 10, The Bachelor
- Amanda Balionis, sports reporter
- Danah Boyd, social media scholar
- Jim Furyk, professional golfer and 2003 U.S. Open champion
- Cam Gallagher, professional baseball player, Cleveland Guardians and Kansas City Royals
- June N. Honaman (Class of 1937), Republican member of the Pennsylvania House of Representatives (1977–1988), the second woman to represent Lancaster County in the State Legislature, and the first woman to chair a House committee
- Alec Kreider, serial killer, the Haines family murders
- Nick Kurtz, professional baseball player, Athletics (attended, did not graduate)
- Ben Mann, professional football player, New York Giants
- Steven Mentzer, Pennsylvania state legislator
- Brian Nana-Sinkam, professional soccer player
- Brad Rutter, Jeopardy! champion with the second-largest winnings in game show history
- Zarek Valentin, professional soccer player, Minnesota United
- Joan Klein Weidman, television personality
