= Oregon Mill Complex =

- U.S. National Register of Historic Places
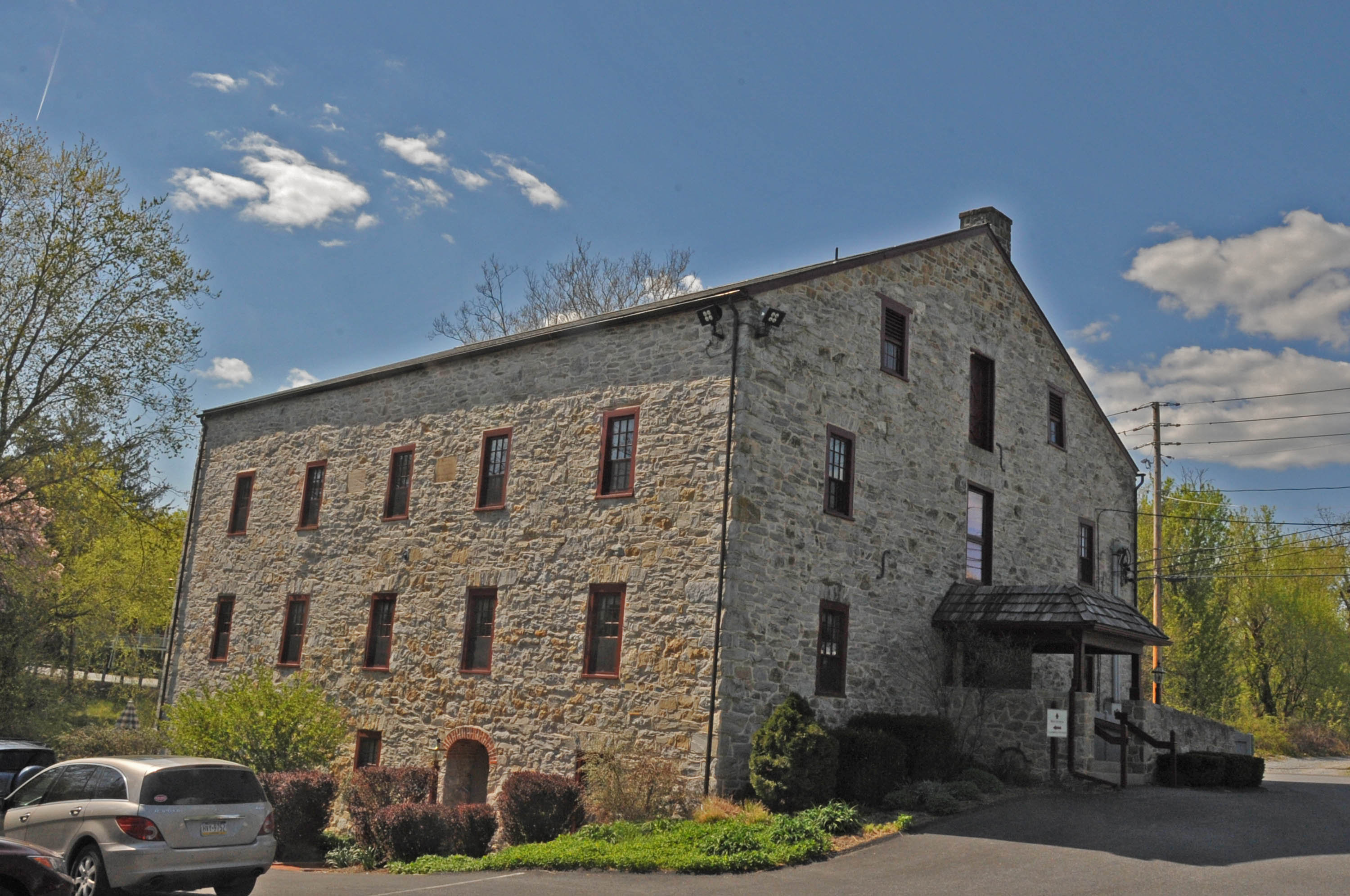
- Mill

- Location within Pennsylvania Location within the United States
- Location: 1415 Oregon Rd., Manheim Township, Pennsylvania
- Coordinates: 40°6′48″N 76°15′0″W
- Area: 4.9 acres (2.0 ha)
- Architectural style: Italianate
- NRHP reference No.: 85001389
- Added to NRHP: June 27, 1985

The Oregon Mill Complex, also known as the Oregon Pike Mill & House or the Oregon Mill-Twin Springs Farm, is an historic grist mill complex in Oregon, Manheim Township, Lancaster County, Pennsylvania along Lititz Run.

It was listed on the National Register of Historic Places in 1985.

== History and architectural features ==
Built in 1814, this historic building is a two- to three-story, limestone structure, that is five bays by three bays with a gable roof. The mill was rebuilt in 1909. The former miller's house is a two-and-one-half-story, stucco-coated, stone, conservative Italianate-style building with a hipped roof. The limestone end barn was built between 1798 and 1815, and features a high-pitched gable roof.
