= Jere Strittmatter =

American politician

Jere L. Strittmatter

Member of the Pennsylvania House of Representatives from the 97th district
- In office January 3, 1989 – November 30, 2002
- Preceded by: June N. Honaman
- Succeeded by: Roy E. Baldwin

Personal details
- Born: April 11, 1950 (age 76) York, Pennsylvania
- Party: Republican
- Spouse: Marianne
- Children: Bradley, Kristen, Elsbeth, Charlotte
- Education: Franklin & Marshall College

Jere L. Strittmatter (born April 11, 1950) is a former Republican member of the Pennsylvania House of Representatives.

He graduated from York Suburban High School in 1968 and from Franklin & Marshall College in 1972. He was first elected to represent the 97th legislative district in 1988. He was defeated in the 2002 Republican primary by Roy E. Baldwin

He is now a senior consultant at Triad Strategies, a Harrisburg lobbying and public relations firm.
