= John C. Bear =

American politician

Member of the Pennsylvania House of Representatives from the 97th district
- In office January 2, 2007 – January 1, 2013
- Preceded by: Roy E. Baldwin
- Succeeded by: Steven Mentzer

Personal details
- Born: 1972 (age 53–54) Ephrata, Pennsylvania, U.S.
- Party: Republican
- Spouse: Bobbi
- Children: 1
- Education: Temple University (BA); University of Pennsylvania (MGA); Georgetown University (certificate); George Mason University (certificate)
- Occupation: Politician
- Website: townshiprepublicans.com

John C. Bear (born 1972) is a former member of the Pennsylvania House of Representatives for the 97th District.

== Biography ==
Bear grew up in Lititz, Pennsylvania. He is a graduate of Warwick High School. He received a B.A. with Honors in Political Science from Temple University, followed by a Master's of Governmental Administration (MGA) from the University of Pennsylvania. He is also a graduate of the Engalitcheff Institute on Comparative Political and Economic Systems at Georgetown University. While in college, he interned for Congressman Robert S. Walker.

Bear served as Borough Councilman in Lititz, Pennsylvania.

Bear worked for an international management and technology consulting company, BearingPoint, for 9 years.

From January 2, 2007, through January 1, 2013, Bear served as a Republican member of the Pennsylvania House of Representatives for the 97th District. He originally sought reelection in 2012, winning the Republican primary, but he later decided not to seek another term and withdrew from the race before the general election. Republicans then chose Steven Mentzer to replace Bear on the general election ballot. Mentzer was unopposed in the general election.

In 2021, Bear re-entered local politics after winning one of four spots in the Republican primary for Manheim Township commissioner. His stated campaign goals include low taxes and better government transparency. Following the 2021 Municipal Elections in Pennsylvania, Bear was elected to one of four contested seats on the Manheim Township board of commissioners as part of a red wave, retaking control from the local Democrats.
