= Harold Horn =

American politician

Harold A. Horn

Member of the Pennsylvania House of Representatives from the 96th district
- In office 1971–1972
- Preceded by: John C. Pittenger
- Succeeded by: Marvin E. Miller, Jr.

Personal details
- Born: Harold Acker Horn; May 10, 1924 Gap, Pennsylvania, US
- Died: December 31, 1985 (aged 61) Lancaster County, Pennsylvania, US
- Party: Republican
- Education: Franklin and Marshall College

Military service
- Branch/service: United States Army

Harold Acker Horn (May 10, 1924 – December 31, 1985) is a former Republican member of the Pennsylvania House of Representatives. He was born in Gap, Pennsylvania to Albert M. and Lavinia M. Acker Horn.

Harold Horn died December 31, 1985.
