= Lititz Run =

Stream in Pennsylvania, USA

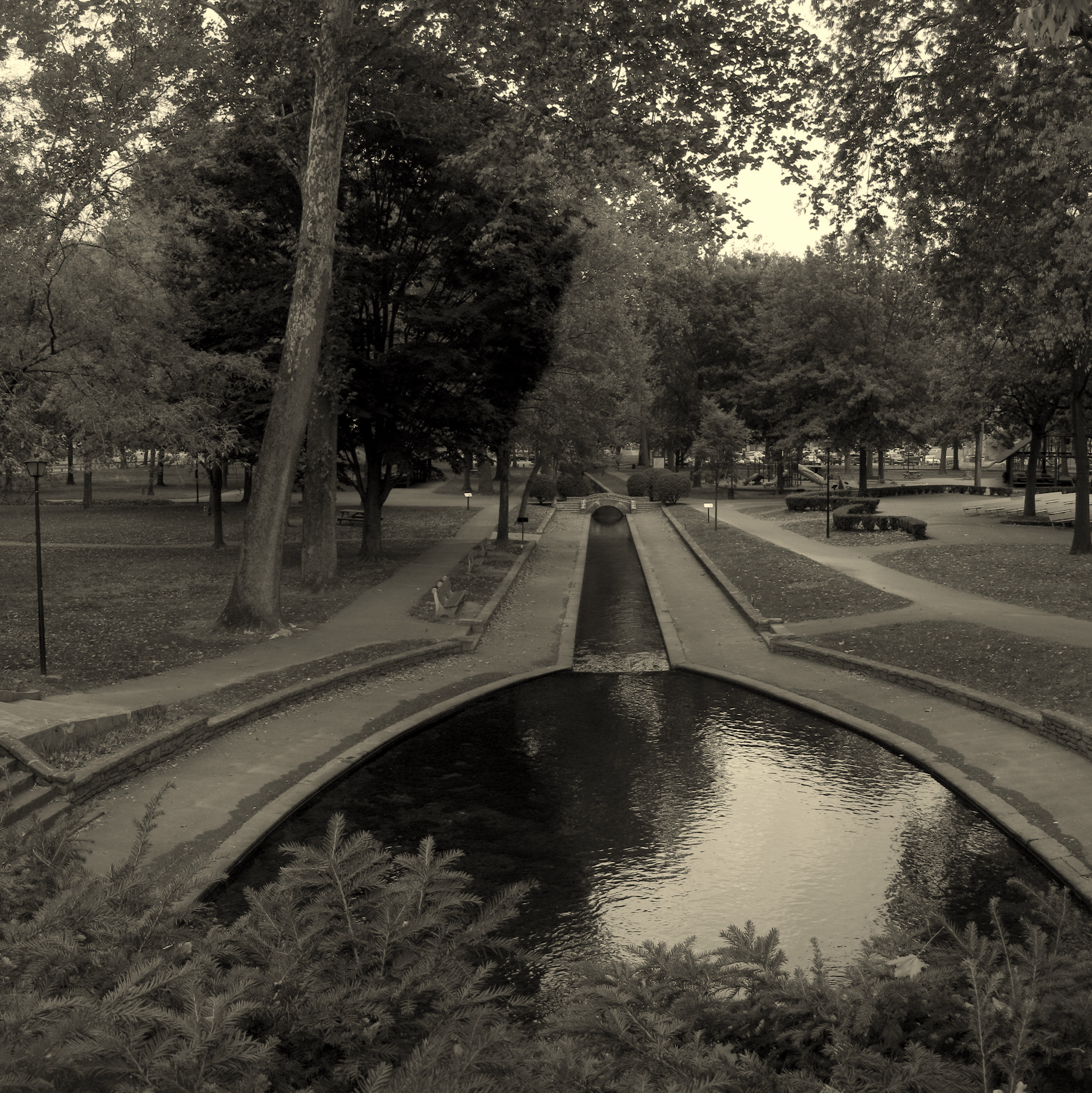
- Source of Lititz Run in Lititz Springs Park

Physical characteristics
- Source
  - location: Lititz Springs Park, Lititz, Lancaster County, Pennsylvania
  - coordinates: 40°9′25″N 76°18′42″W
  - elevation: 384 ft (117 m)
- Mouth
  - location: Conestoga River, Oregon, Lancaster County, Pennsylvania
  - coordinates: 40°6′19″N 76°14′55″W
  - elevation: 276 ft (84 m)
- Length: 7.2 mi (11.6 km)
- Basin size: 12 mi^{2} (31 km^{2})

Basin features
- Tributaries
  - right: New Haven Run, Santo Domingo Creek, Hubers Run, Lititz Spring

Lititz Run is a 7.2-mile-long (11.6 km) tributary of the Conestoga River in Lancaster County, Pennsylvania in the United States.

The creek flows from the springs of Lititz Springs Park in Lititz, Pennsylvania southwest past Rothsville through the Millport Conservancy towards Oregon. Blue Herons are known to nest in the area. Lititz Run joins the Conestoga just downstream from its confluence with the Cocalico Creek, at the Pinetown Covered Bridge.

Lititz Run is known as a model watershed project after wetland and riparian corridor restoration work was performed starting in 1997 by the Lititz Run Watershed Alliance.

The run powered industry in the area in the 1700s and 1800s, including mills at Millport, Oregon, and Pinetown and industry in Lititz.

== See also ==
- List of rivers of Pennsylvania
