= Steven Mentzer =

American politician

Member of the Pennsylvania House of Representatives from the 97th district
- Incumbent
- Assumed office January 1, 2013
- Preceded by: John C. Bear

Personal details
- Born: October 24, 1956 (age 69)
- Party: Republican
- Spouse: Sally Mentzer
- Education: Manheim Township High School; Elizabethtown College (attended)
- Occupation: Legislator

Steven C. Mentzer (born October 24, 1956) is a Republican member of the Pennsylvania House of Representatives. He has represented the 97th District since 2013.

Mentzer graduated from Manheim Township High School. He attended but did not graduate from Elizabethtown College. Mentzer spent several decades working in finance, holding an accounting position at Merrill Lynch and later serving as a financial advisor at Smith Barney. A long time volunteer to humanitarian organizations, in 2007, Mentzer founded a Central American Relief Efforts, a small nonprofit organization.

Mentzer began his political career in 2009 when he won, unopposed, the race for Manheim Township Treasurer. During his term as treasurer he ran for the state house position in 2012 after incumbent John C. Bear dropped out after winning the Republican primary, and won unopposed in the general election. He has successfully run for re-election in the subsequent four general elections.

Mentzer is currently a member of the Aging & Older Adult Services, Insurance, Professional Licensure, and Tourism & Recreational Development committees.
