= June Honaman =

American politician

June N. Honaman

Member of the Pennsylvania House of Representatives from the 97th district
- In office 1977–1988
- Preceded by: Marvin E. Miller, Sr.
- Succeeded by: Jere Strittmatter

Personal details
- Born: May 24, 1920 Lancaster, Pennsylvania, U.S.
- Died: December 3, 1994 (aged 74) Lancaster, Pennsylvania, U.S.
- Party: Republican
- Spouse: Peter K. Honaman (m. 1948)
- Parent(s): Lester W. Newcomer and Maude (Stauffer) Newcomer
- Education: Bachelor of Fine Arts, Beaver College (now Arcadia University), 1941
- Occupation: Educator, businesswoman and state government official

June N. Honaman (May 24, 1920 – December 3, 1994) was an American government official. A Republican member of the Pennsylvania House of Representatives, she became the second woman ever to represent Lancaster County in the Pennsylvania State Legislature when she was elected to represent Pennsylvania's 97th district in 1976 and then also became the first woman in the history of the House to chair the Military and Veterans Affairs Committee.

== Early life ==
Born in Lancaster, Pennsylvania on May 24, 1920, June Newcomer was a daughter of Lester W. Newcomer and Maude (Stauffer) Newcomer. She graduated from Manheim Township High School in 1937 and then earned her Bachelor of Fine Arts degree from Beaver College (now Arcadia University) in 1941. She also attended the Lancaster Business School.

On November 20, 1948, she wed attorney Peter K. Honaman.

== Career ==
A teacher from 1947 to 1952, Honaman later worked for the Armstrong Cork Company. A member of the Pennsylvania Council of Republican Women, she co-chaired the Women's Republican Club of Lancaster County in 1949, served as vice chair of the Pennsylvania Republican Party from 1964 to 1975, and also served as an elected delegate to the Republican National Convention in 1964, 1968 and 1972.

Appointed by Pennsylvania's Governor to the Pennsylvania Commission on the Status of Women, she served in that capacity from 1964 to 1972. She was then appointed to the Governor's Task Force on Election Reform in 1975.

Elected to the Pennsylvania House of Representatives in 1976 as a Republican, she served six consecutive terms, during which time she was appointed to the Pennsylvania Council on the Arts, serving in that capacity from 1981 to 1988. She also served on the agriculture, ethics, federal and state affairs, state government, and Republican policy committees during her tenure with the House. She opted not to run for reelection in 1988.

== Death and interment ==
Honaman died in Lancaster on December 3, 1994 and was interred at that city's Woodward Cemetery.
