= Marvin E. Miller Sr. =

American politician

Marvin E. Miller Jr.

Member of the Pennsylvania House of Representatives from the 96th district
- In office 1969–1976
- Preceded by: District created
- Succeeded by: June N. Honaman

Member of the Pennsylvania House of Representatives from the Lancaster County district
- In office 1967–1968

Personal details
- Born: May 28, 1927 Lime Rock, Pennsylvania, U.S.
- Died: October 4, 1999 (aged 72) Lancaster, Pennsylvania, U.S
- Children: Marvin E. Miller Jr.

Marvin E. Miller Sr. (May 28, 1927 – October 4, 1999) was an American politician and Republican member of the Pennsylvania House of Representatives. His son, Marvin E. Miller Jr., was also a state representative.
