= Marvin E. Miller Jr. =

American politician (1945–2016)

Member of the Pennsylvania House of Representatives from the 96th district
- In office 1973–1990
- Preceded by: Harold A. Horn
- Succeeded by: Mike Sturla

Personal details
- Born: December 13, 1945 Lancaster, Pennsylvania, U.S.
- Died: September 30, 2016 (aged 70) Lancaster, Pennsylvania, U.S.
- Party: Republican
- Relations: Marvin E. Miller, Sr. (father)

Marvin E. Miller Jr. (December 13, 1945 – September 30, 2016) was an American politician and Republican member of the Pennsylvania House of Representatives.
