= Nikki Rivera =

American politician

Member of the Pennsylvania House of Representatives from the 96th district
- Incumbent
- Assumed office December 1, 2024
- Preceded by: Mike Sturla

Personal details
- Born: Carlisle, Pennsylvania, U.S.
- Party: Democratic
- Education: University of Pittsburgh
- Website: www.nikkiriveraforpa.com

Nikki Rivera is an American politician that represents the 96th district in the Pennsylvania House of Representatives as a Democrat since 2024.
