= Pennsylvania House of Representatives, District 96 =

American legislative district

Pennsylvania's 96th State House of Representatives district
Representative
Nikki Rivera; D–Lancaster
- Population (2022): 63,476

The 96th Pennsylvania House of Representatives District is located in South Central Pennsylvania and has been represented by Nikki Rivera since 2024.

It was previously held by Mike Sturla since 1991.

== District profile ==
The 96th District is located in Lancaster County and includes the following areas:

- East Petersburg, Pennsylvania
- Lancaster (part)
  - Ward 01
  - Ward 02 (part)
    - Division 01
  - Ward 05,
  - Ward 06 (part)
    - Division 01
    - Division 02
    - Division 03
    - Division 04
    - Division 05
    - Division 06
    - Division 07
  - Ward 09
- Manheim Township (part)
  - District 01
  - District 03
  - District 04
  - District 05
  - District 07 A
  - District 07 B
  - District 08
  - District 09
  - District 10
  - District 11
  - District 14
  - District 15
  - District 16
  - District 17
  - District 18
  - District 19
  - District 20
  - District 21
  - District 22
  - District 23

== Representatives ==
Representative	Party	Years	District home	Note
Prior to 1969, seats were apportioned by county.
John C. Pittenger	Democrat	1969 – 1970		
Harold A. Horn	Republican	1971 – 1972		
Marvin E. Miller, Jr.	Republican	1973 – 1990		
Michael Sturla	Democrat	1991 – 2024	Lancaster	
Nikki Rivera	Democrat	2024 – present	Lancaster	Incumbent
