= Pinetown Bushong's Mill Covered Bridge =

Covered bridge in Pennsylvania, US

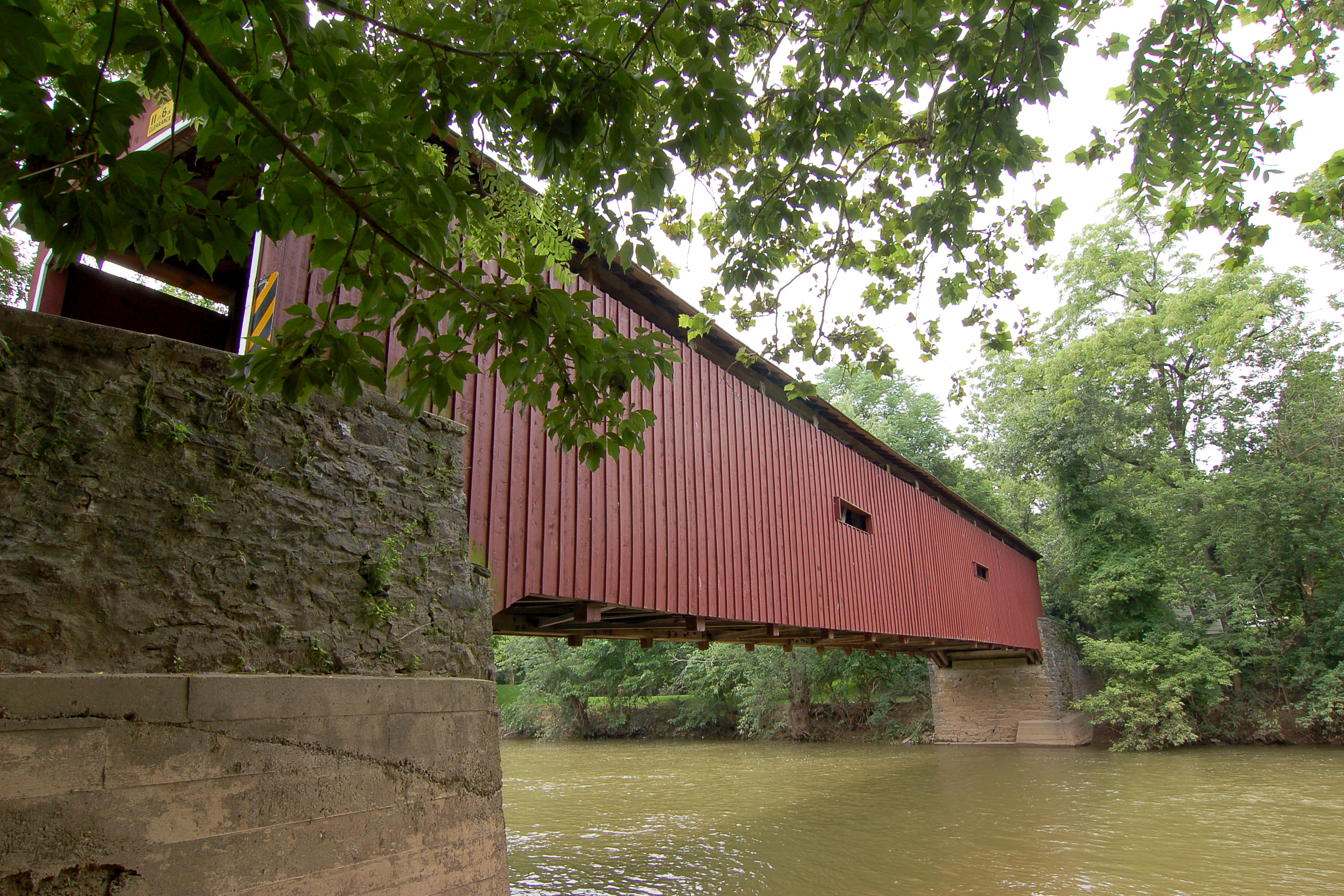
- Coordinates: 40.1053°N 76.2482°W
- Locale: Lancaster County, Pennsylvania, United States
- Official name: Big Conestoga #6 Bridge

Characteristics
- Design: single span, double Burr arch truss
- Total length: 133 feet (41 m)

History
- Constructed by: Elias McMellen
- Construction start: 1867
- Pinetown Bushong's Mill Covered Bridge
- U.S. National Register of Historic Places
- MPS: Covered Bridges of Lancaster County TR
- NRHP reference No.: 80003527
- Added to NRHP: December 11, 1980

Location
- Interactive map of Pinetown Bushong's Mill Covered Bridge

The Pinetown Bushong's Mill Covered Bridge is a covered bridge that spans the Conestoga River in Lancaster County, Pennsylvania, United States. A county-owned and maintained bridge, its official designation is the Big Conestoga #6 Bridge. The bridge is also known as Pinetown Covered Bridge, Nolte's Point Mill Bridge and Bushong's Mill Bridge.

The bridge has a single span, wooden, double Burr arch trusses design with the addition of steel hanger rods. The deck is made from oak planks. It is painted red, the traditional color of Lancaster County covered bridges, on both the inside and outside. Both approaches to the bridge are painted in red with white trim.

The bridge's WGCB Number is 38-36-05. Added in 1980, it is listed on the National Register of Historic Places as structure number 80003527. It is located at 40°6′19.2″N 76°14′53.4″W (40.10533, -76.24817).

Lititz Run joins the Conestoga River at this site.

== History ==
The bridge was built in 1867 by Elias McMellen at a cost of $4,500. In 1972 it was destroyed as a result of flooding caused by Hurricane Agnes. Due to a tremendous response of area residents who signed a petition for its reconstruction, it was among the first covered bridges to be restored after Agnes. In the spring of 1973 the bridge was rebuilt by the nearby Amish. To prevent damage due to future flooding, they raised the bridge to 17 feet 6 inches (5.33 m) above the average water line. However, the bridge was closed after flood damage sustained due to Tropical Storm Lee in 2011. The bridge was reopened in January 2014.

== Dimensions ==
- Length: 124 feet (38 m) span and 133 feet (41 m) total length
- Width: 12 feet 10 inches (3.91 m) clear deck and 15 feet (4.6 m) total width
- Overhead clearance: 11 feet 6 inches (3.51 m)
- Underclearance: 15 feet (4.6 m) as listed by the county government or 17 feet 6 inches (5.33 m) with respect to the average water level

== Gallery ==
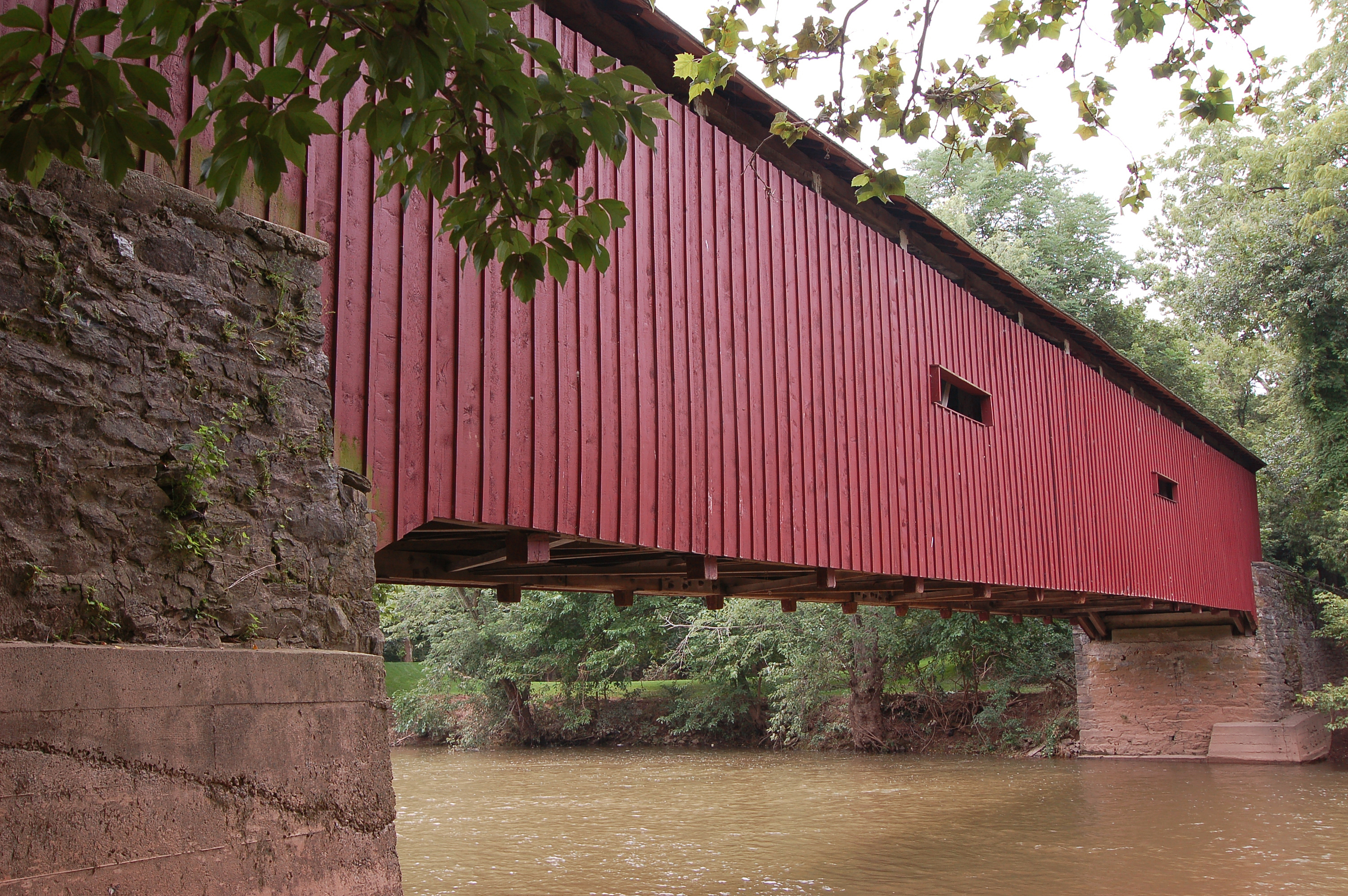
A view of the bridge from the side

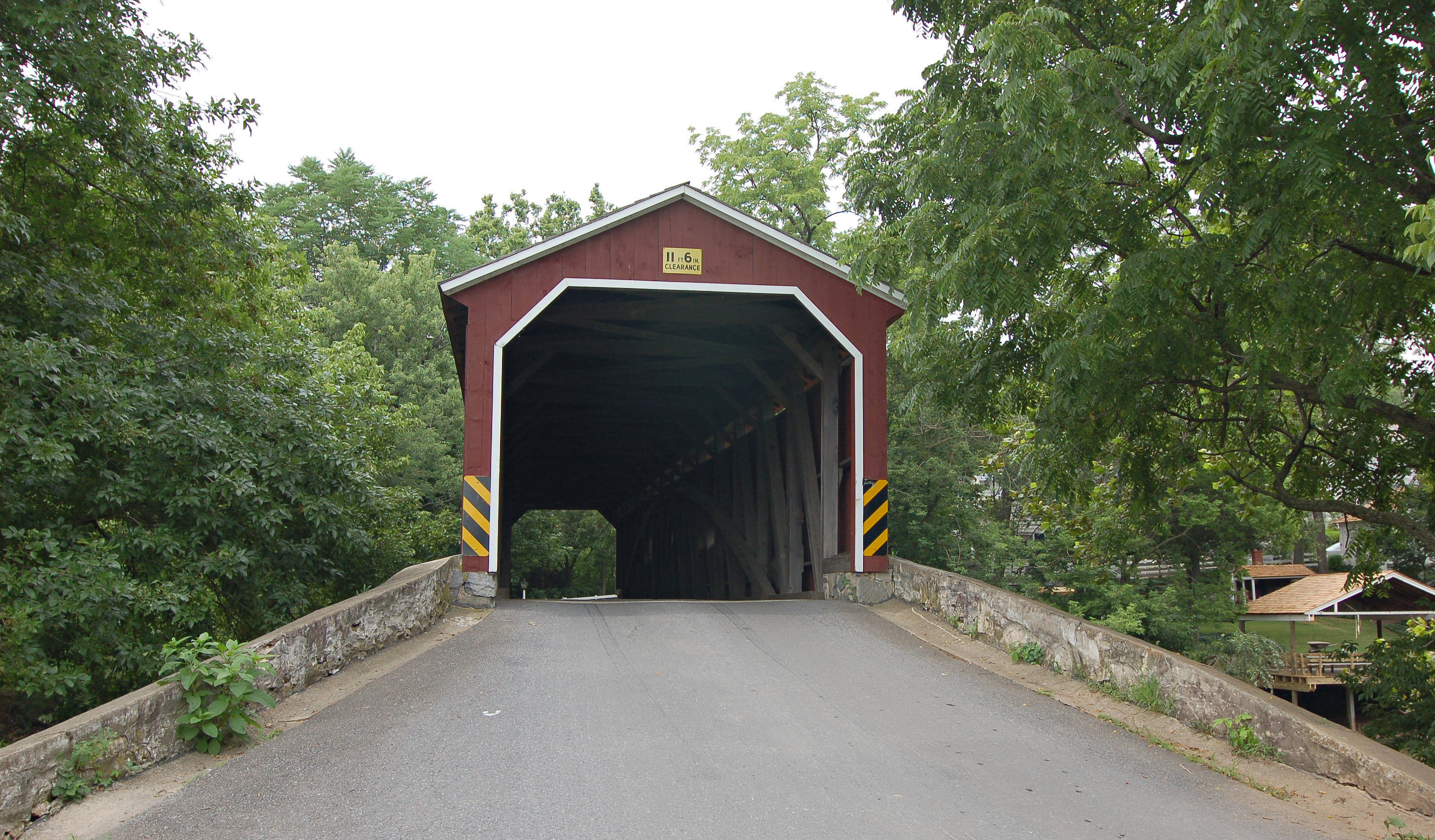
One of the approaches to the bridge

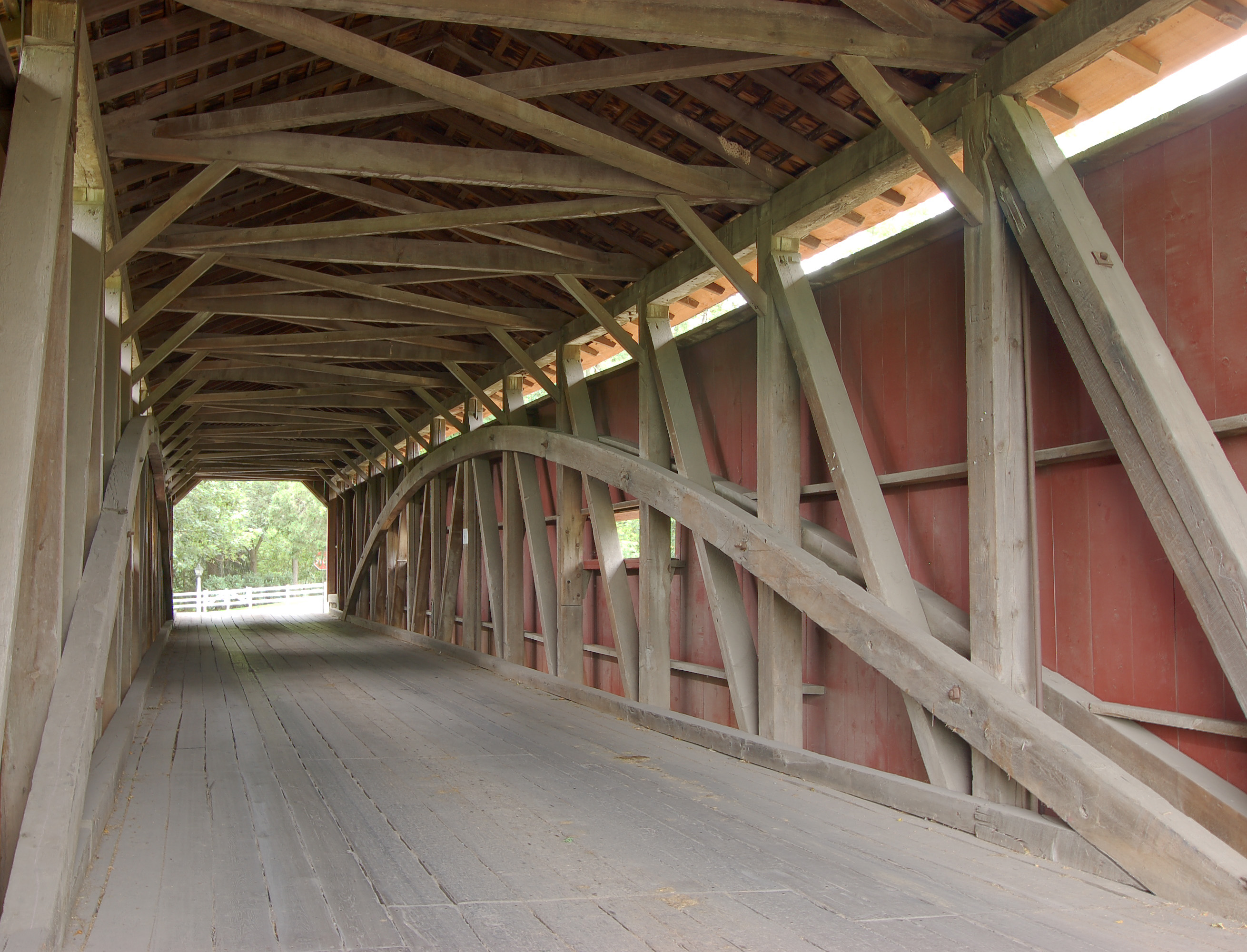
The inside of the bridge showing the Burr arch truss

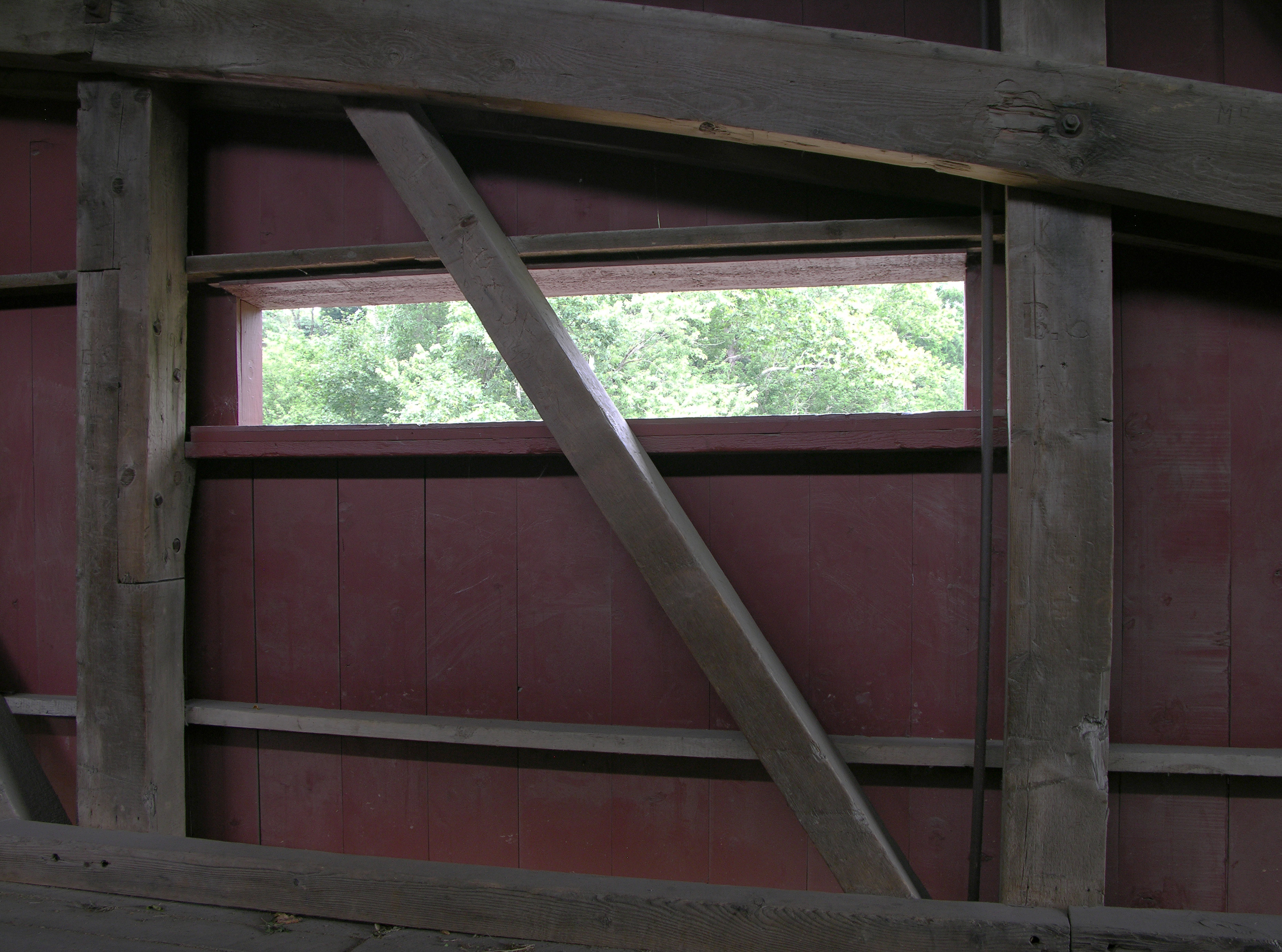
A view from inside of the window on the side of the bridge

== See also ==
- Burr arch truss
- List of crossings of the Conestoga River
- List of Lancaster County covered bridges
