= Manheim Township School District =

School district in Pennsylvania

Coordinates: 40.09225°N 76.30519°W

Location
- Lancaster County, Pennsylvania United States

Students and staff
- Colors: Blue and white

Other information
- Website: Manheim Township School District

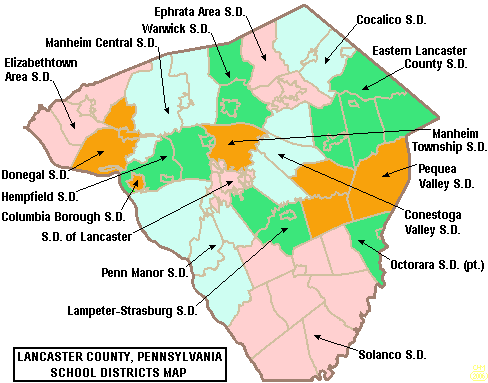
Map of public school districts in Lancaster County, Pennsylvania with Manheim Township School District (in orange at the center of the map)

Manheim Township School District is a suburban, public school district of over 5,000 students in nine schools located in Manheim Township, Lancaster County, Pennsylvania, United States. The district is known in the Lancaster County region for its academic achievement, popular quiz bowl team, and Manheim Township Performing Arts.

The district draws students from a single eponymous township of approximately 23 square miles (60 km^{2}), with over 13,400 residential dwellings, and about 31,300 residents as of 2006. The district's public school population of almost 6,000 students in kindergarten through twelfth grades is distributed over 24 school buildings: there are six elementary schools (grades K–4), a single 5th and 6th-grade building, one middle school (grades 7–8), and one high school (grades 9–12).

The district students are 67% white, 9% Asian, 5% Black, 13% Hispanic, and 7% multi-racial.

Manheim Township High School finished construction in 2008. The district's Manheim Township Landis Run Intermediate finished construction in 2012. The Mannheim Township Middle School finished construction in 2021.

The district's colors are blue and white. A traditional rival of the district is Warwick.

== See also ==
- Manheim Township High School
