= Manheim Township, Lancaster County, Pennsylvania =

Township in Pennsylvania, US

Coordinates: 40°07′36″N 76°16′59″W

- Township
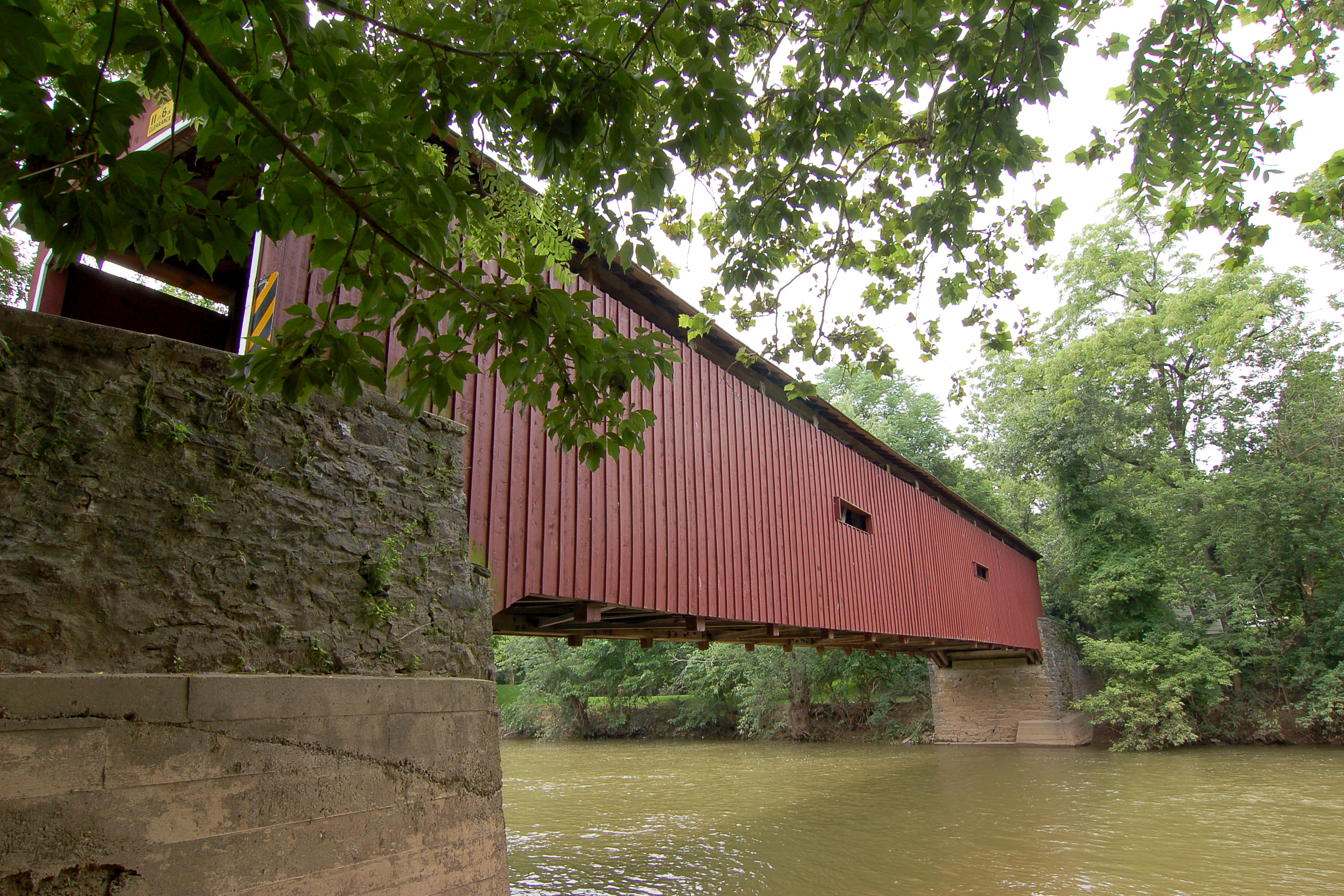
- Pinetown Bushong's Mill Covered Bridge over the Conestoga River

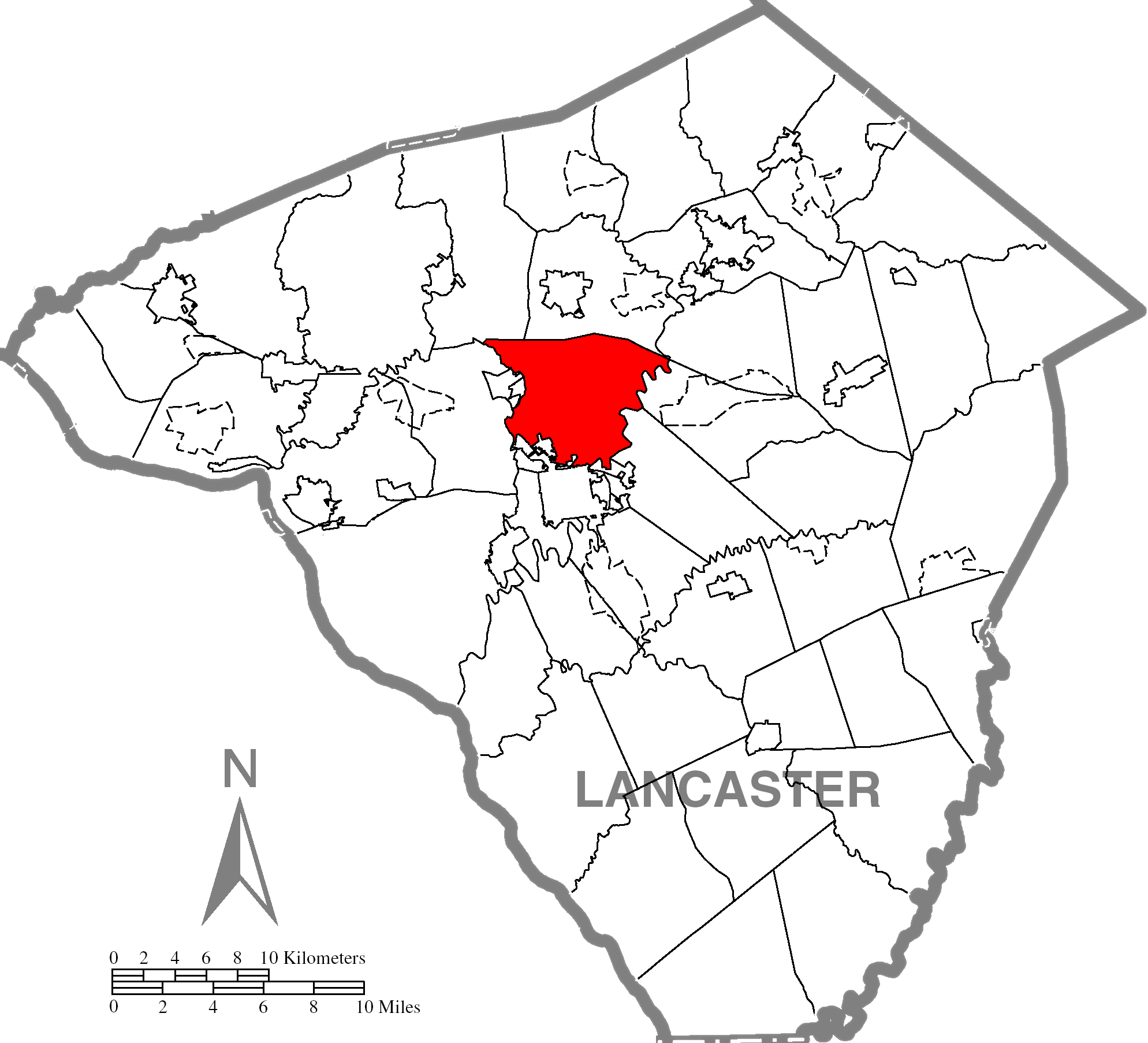
- Map of Lancaster County with Manheim Township highlighted in red
- Country: United States
- State: Pennsylvania
- County: Lancaster
- Settled: 1729
- Incorporated: 1729

Government
  - Type: Board of Commissioners

Area
  - Total: 24.07 sq mi (62.35 km^{2})
  - Land: 23.86 sq mi (61.81 km^{2})
  - Water: 0.21 sq mi (0.54 km^{2})

Population (2020)
  - Total: 43,977 ▲
  - Estimate (2022): 44,132
  - Density: 1,690/sq mi (651/km^{2})
- Time zone: UTC-5 (Eastern (EST))
  - Summer (DST): UTC-4 (EDT)
- Area code: 717
- FIPS code: 42-071-46896
- Website: www.manheimtownship.org

Manheim Township is a township in Lancaster County, Pennsylvania, United States. It was established in 1729. The township's southernmost border meets the city limits of Lancaster and includes the communities of Neffsville, Dillerville, and Landis Valley. Its population, as of the 2020 census, was 43,977 making it the second largest municipality in the county after Lancaster City.

== Government ==
Residents of Manheim Township elect a five-member Board of Commissioners. Commissioners are elected to serve a four-year term. The township also elects a tax collector and magisterial district judge which serve a four-year and six-year term respectively.

As a result of the 2025 Municipal Election, Democrats will hold a all seats on the township commissioner's board. The elected officials will be (after the newly elected are sworn in, January 2026):

Elected Officials
Office	Holder	Party	Electoral History
Commissioner	Carol Giffords	Democrat	Elected 11/07/2023
Commissioner	Celso Mesias	Democrat	Elected 11/07/2023
Commissioner	Marilyn Zenko	Democrat	Elected 11/04/2025
Commissioner	Sam Kulp	Democrat	Elected 11/04/2025
Commissioner	Jeremy Zimmerman	Democrat	Elected 11/04/2025
Tax Collector	Ryan Dodson	Democrat	Elected 11/04/2025
Magisterial District Judge	Courtney Monson, Esq.	Democrat	Elected 11/07/2023

Previously, after the 2023 elections, the elected officials were:

Office	Holder	Party	Electoral history
Commissioner	John C. Bear	Republican	Elected 11/02/2021
Commissioner	Mary Jo Huyard	Republican	Elected 11/02/2021
Commissioner	Stacey Morgan Brubaker	Republican	Elected 11/02/2021
Commissioner	Carol Giffords	Democrat	Elected 11/07/2023
Commissioner	Celso Mesias	Democrat	Elected 11/07/2023
Tax Collector	Cherie L. Cryer	Republican	Elected 11/02/2021
Magisterial District Judge	Courtney Monson, Esq.	Democrat	Elected 11/07/2023

Historically, Manheim Township was seen as a Republican stronghold but in recent years the suburban township has become more competitive resulting in numerous high-investment races. Following Democratic gains in the elections of 2023 and 2025, the party will hold all elected offices in both the township and its coterminous magisterial district.

Manheim Township is split between both Pennsylvania House of Representatives District 96 represented by Democrat Nikki Rivera and Pennsylvania House of Representatives District 97 represented by Republican Steven Mentzer, The township is located entirely within Pennsylvania Senate District 36 is represented by Democrat James Malone.

The township is represented in the U.S. House of Representatives by Republican Lloyd Smucker.

== Geography ==
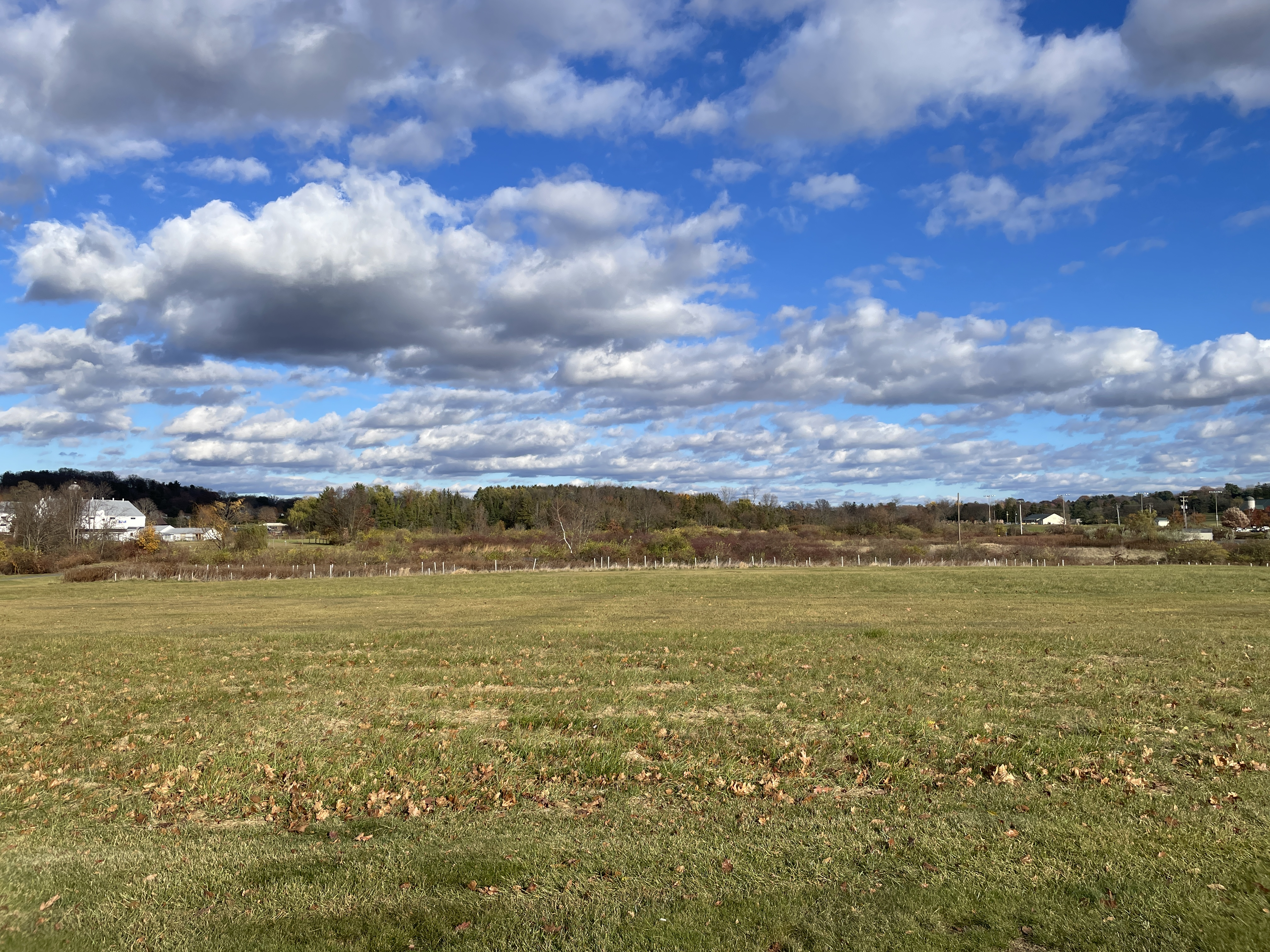
Overlook Park

According to the U.S. Census Bureau, the township has a total area of 24.3 square miles (62.9 km^{2}), of which 24.2 square miles (62.7 km^{2}) are land and 0.1 square miles (0.2 km^{2}), or 0.33%, are water.

Manheim Township is home to the Neffsville post office but does not have its own ZIP code, therefore its residents share postal designations with neighboring municipalities. Residents living in the northernmost parts of the township have a Lititz address, residents living in the central and southern parts of the township have a Lancaster address, and residents living in the easternmost parts of the township have a Leola address.

The unincorporated community of Neffsville is located within Manheim Township.

== Demographics ==
Historical population
Census	Pop.	Note	%±
1850	2,087		—
1860	2,510		20.3%
1870	2,603		3.7%
1880	2,935		12.8%
1890	2,883		−1.8%
1900	3,111		7.9%
1910	3,750		20.5%
1920	4,280		14.1%
1930	6,306		47.3%
1940	7,610		20.7%
1950	9,289		22.1%
1960	14,855		59.9%
1970	21,539		45.0%
1980	26,042		20.9%
1990	28,880		10.9%
2000	33,697		16.7%
2010	38,133		13.2%
2020	43,977		15.3%
2022 (est.)	44,138		0.4%
U.S. Decennial Census

At the 2000 census there were 33,697 people, 12,961 households, and 9,280 families living in the township. The population density was 1,391.6 inhabitants per square mile (537.3/km^{2}). There were 13,434 housing units at an average density of 554.8 per square mile (214.2/km^{2}). The racial makeup of the township was 93.18% White, 1.46% African American, 0.11% Native American, 3.13% Asian, 0.01% Pacific Islander, 1.02% from other races, and 1.09% from two or more races. Hispanic or Latino of any race were 2.77%.

There were 12,961 households, 31.0% had children under the age of 18 living with them, 63.1% were married couples living together, 6.4% had a female householder with no husband present, and 28.4% were non-families. 24.8% of households were made up of individuals, and 12.8% were one person aged 65 or older. The average household size was 2.47 and the average family size was 2.96.

The age distribution was 23.2% under the age of 18, 5.8% from 18 to 24, 24.9% from 25 to 44, 25.2% from 45 to 64, and 21.0% 65 or older. The median age was 43 years. For every 100 females, there were 88.3 males. For every 100 females age 18 and over, there were 83.7 males.

The median annual income for a household in the township was $55,807, and the median annual income for a family was $67,365. Males had a median annual income of $46,940 versus $29,618 for females. The per capita income for the township was $28,730. About 2.4% of families and 4.0% of the population were below the poverty line, including 3.7% of those under age 18 and 6.1% of those age 65 or over.

== Education ==
Students enrolled in public schools attend Manheim Township School District. Manheim Township School District is coterminous with the municipality. The district operates the following schools:

- Manheim Township High School
- Manheim Township Virtual High School
- Manheim Township Middle School
- Landis Run Intermediate School
- Brecht Elementary
- Bucher Elementary
- Neff Elementary
- Nitrauer Elementary
- Reidenbaugh Elementary
- Schaeffer Elementary

The Manheim Township Board of School Directors articulates the policy, budgetary direction and vision for the school district. It has nine members, elected to terms of four years each.

== Places of interest ==
- Lancaster Airport
- Landis Valley Museum
- Neffsville
- Oregon Mill Complex
- Shreiner Farm

== See also ==
- Manheim Township School District
- Manheim Township High School
