= 2006 United States House of Representatives elections in Pennsylvania =

- November 7, 2006

All 19 Pennsylvania seats to the United States House of Representatives
	Majority party	Minority party
Party	Democratic	Republican
Last election	7	12
Seats won	11	8
Seat change	▲4	▼4
Popular vote	2,229,091	1,732,163
Percentage	55.57%	43.18%
Swing	▲6.86%	▼6.7%

Democratic hold Democratic gain
Republican hold
Democratic
50–60%
60–70%
70–80%
80–90%
>90%
Republican
50–60%
60–70%
70–80%

The 2006 United States House elections in Pennsylvania was an election for Pennsylvania's delegation to the United States House of Representatives, which occurred as part of the general election of the House of Representatives on November 7, 2006.

== Overview ==
United States House of Representatives elections in Pennsylvania, 2006
Party	Votes	Percentage	Seats Before	Seats After	+/–
Democratic	2,229,091	55.57%	7	11	+4
Republican	1,732,163	43.18%	12	8	-4
Green	33,287	0.83%	0	0	0
Constitution	8,706	0.22%	0	0	0
Independent	7,958	0.20%	0	0	0
Totals	4,011,205	100.00%	19	19	—

== Match-up summary ==
District	Democratic		Republican		Others		Total		Result
District	Votes	%	Votes	%	Votes	%	Votes	%	Result
District 1	137,987	100.00%	0	0.00%	0	0.00%	137,987	100.00%	Democratic hold
District 2	165,867	88.57%	17,291	9.23%	4,125	2.20%	187,283	100.00%	Democratic hold
District 3	85,110	42.06%	108,525	53.64%	8,706	4.30%	202,341	100.00%	Republican hold
District 4	131,847	51.93%	122,049	48.07%	0	0.00%	253,896	100.00%	Democratic gain
District 5	76,456	39.91%	115,126	60.09%	0	0.00%	191,582	100.00%	Republican hold
District 6	117,892	49.34%	121,047	50.66%	0	0.00%	238,939	100.00%	Republican hold
District 7	147,898	56.38%	114,426	43.62%	0	0.00%	262,324	100.00%	Democratic gain
District 8	125,656	50.30%	124,138	49.70%	0	0.00%	249,794	100.00%	Democratic gain
District 9	79,610	39.67%	121,069	60.33%	0	0.00%	200,679	100.00%	Republican hold
District 10	110,115	52.95%	97,862	47.05%	0	0.00%	207,977	100.00%	Democratic gain
District 11	134,340	72.47%	51,033	27.53%	0	0.00%	185,373	100.00%	Democratic hold
District 12	123,472	60.80%	79,612	39.20%	0	0.00%	203,084	100.00%	Democratic hold
District 13	147,368	66.13%	75,492	33.87%	0	0.00%	222,860	100.00%	Democratic hold
District 14	161,075	90.09%	0	0.00%	17,720	9.91%	178,795	100.00%	Democratic hold
District 15	86,186	43.50%	106,153	53.57%	5,802	2.93%	198,141	100.00%	Republican hold
District 16	80,915	39.54%	115,741	56.57%	7,958	3.89%	204,614	100.00%	Republican hold
District 17	137,253	64.53%	75,455	35.47%	0	0.00%	212,708	100.00%	Democratic hold
District 18	105,419	42.16%	144,632	57.84%	0	0.00%	250,051	100.00%	Republican hold
District 19	74,625	33.50%	142,512	63.97%	5,640	2.53%	222,777	100.00%	Republican hold
Total	2,229,091	55.57%	1,732,163	43.18%	49,951	1.25%	4,011,205	100.00%	

Popular vote
Democratic	55.57%
Republican	43.18%
Other	1.25%

House seats
Democratic	57.89%
Republican	42.11%

== District 1 ==
2006 Pennsylvania's 1st congressional district election
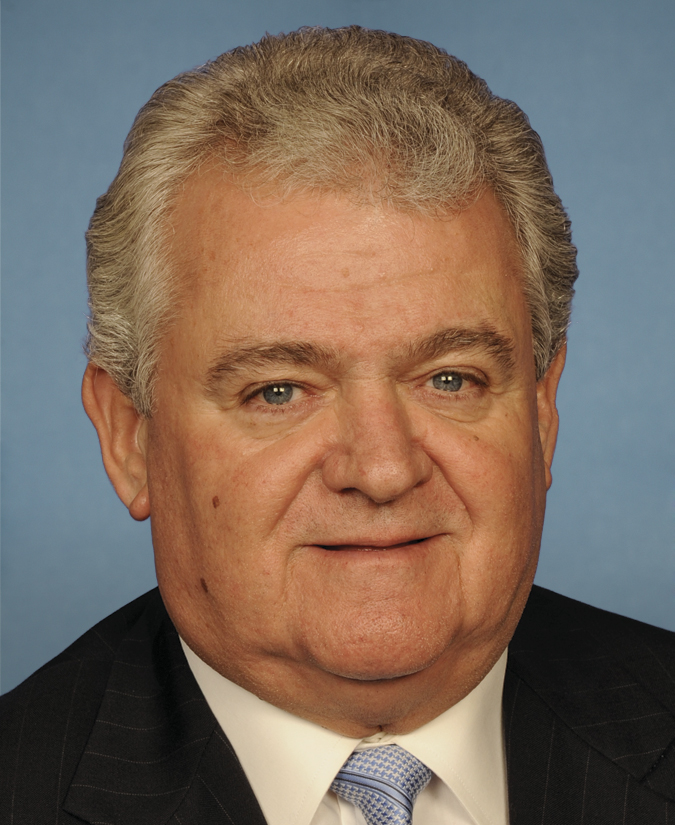
Nominee	Bob Brady
Party	Democratic
Popular vote	137,987
Percentage	100.00%
U.S. representative before election
Bob Brady
Democratic
Elected U.S. representative
Bob Brady
Democratic

=== Democratic primary ===
==== Candidates ====
===== Nominee =====
- Bob Brady, incumbent U.S. Representative

==== Primary results ====
Democratic primary results
Party	Candidate	Votes	%
Democratic	Bob Brady (incumbent)	29,990	100.0
Total votes		29,990	100.0

=== General election ===
==== Predictions ====
Source	Ranking	As of
The Cook Political Report	Safe D	November 6, 2006
Rothenberg	Safe D	November 6, 2006
Sabato's Crystal Ball	Safe D	November 6, 2006
Real Clear Politics	Safe D	November 7, 2006
CQ Politics	Safe D	November 7, 2006

==== Results ====
General Election 2006: Pennsylvania's 1st congressional district
Party	Candidate	Votes	%
Democratic	Robert A. Brady (incumbent)	137,987	100.00
Total votes		137,987	100.00

== District 2 ==
2006 Pennsylvania's 2nd congressional district election
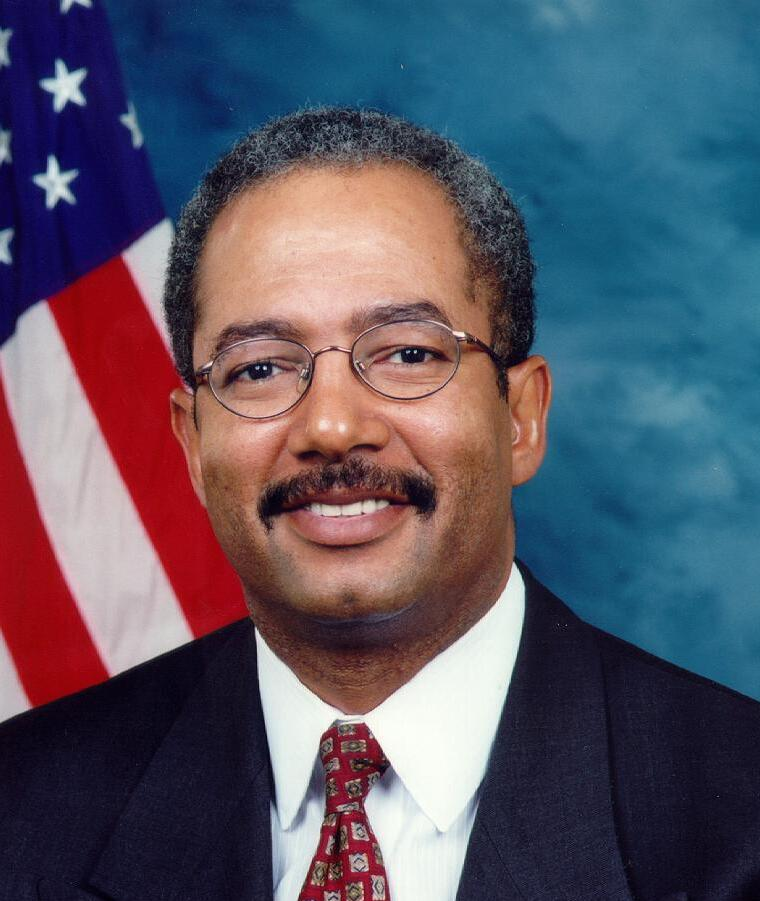

Nominee	Chaka Fattah	Michael Gessner
Party	Democratic	Republican
Popular vote	165,857	17,291
Percentage	88.57%	9.23%
- County results Fattah: 70–80% 80–90%
U.S. representative before election
Chaka Fattah
Democratic
Elected U.S. representative
Chaka Fattah
Democratic

=== Democratic primary ===
==== Candidates ====
===== Nominee =====
- Chaka Fattah, incumbent U.S. Representative

==== Primary results ====
Democratic primary results
Party	Candidate	Votes	%
Democratic	Chaka Fattah (incumbent)	41,566	100.00
Total votes		41,566	100.00

=== Republican primary ===
==== Candidates ====
===== Nominee =====
- Michael Gessner

==== Primary results ====
Republican primary results
Party	Candidate	Votes	%
Republican	Michael Gessner	3,159	100.00
Total votes		3,159	100.00

=== General election ===
==== Predictions ====
Source	Ranking	As of
The Cook Political Report	Safe D	November 6, 2006
Rothenberg	Safe D	November 6, 2006
Sabato's Crystal Ball	Safe D	November 6, 2006
Real Clear Politics	Safe D	November 7, 2006
CQ Politics	Safe D	November 7, 2006

==== Results ====
General Election 2006: Pennsylvania's 2nd congressional district
Party	Candidate	Votes	%
Democratic	Chaka Fattah (incumbent)	165,867	88.57
Republican	Michael Gessner	17,291	9.23
Green	David G. Baker	4,125	2.20
Total votes		187,283	100.00

== District 3 ==
2006 Pennsylvania's 3rd congressional district election
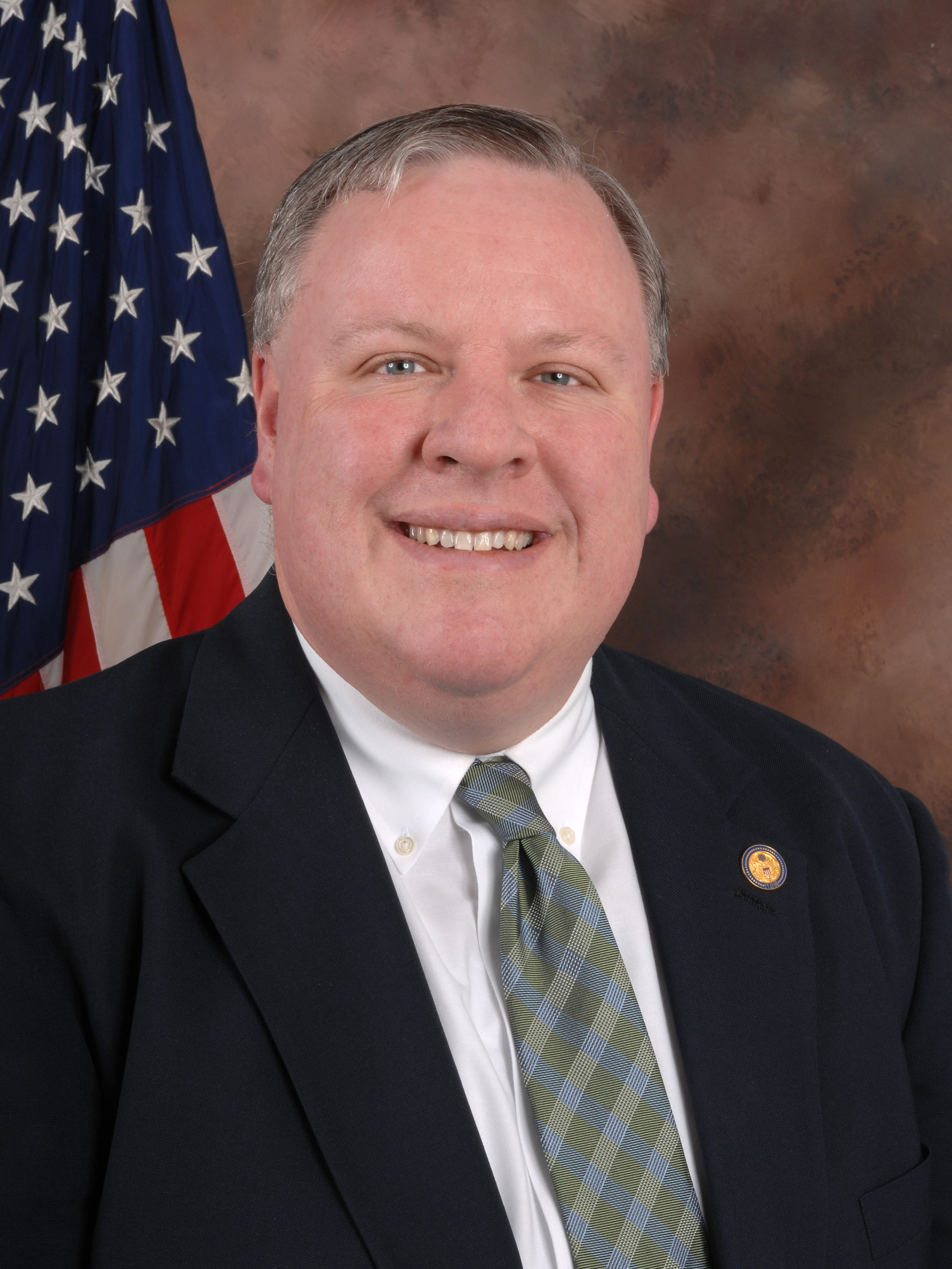

Nominee	Phil English	Steven Porter
Party	Republican	Democratic
Popular vote	108,525	85,110
Percentage	53.64%	42.06%
- County results English: 50–60% 60–70% Porter: 40–50%
U.S. representative before election
Phil English
Republican
Elected U.S. representative
Phil English
Republican

Incumbent Representative Phil English was re-elected with 53.6% of the vote.

=== Democratic primary ===
==== Candidates ====
===== Nominee =====
- Steven Porter

==== Primary results ====
Democratic primary results
Party	Candidate	Votes	%
Democratic	Steven Porter	35,001	100.00
Total votes		35,001	100.00

=== Republican primary ===
==== Candidates ====
===== Nominee =====
- Phil English, incumbent U.S. Representative

==== Primary results ====
Republican primary results
Party	Candidate	Votes	%
Republican	Phil English (incumbent)	36,189	100.00
Total votes		36,189	100.00

=== General election ===
==== Predictions ====
Source	Ranking	As of
The Cook Political Report	Safe R	November 6, 2006
Rothenberg	Safe R	November 6, 2006
Sabato's Crystal Ball	Safe R	November 6, 2006
Real Clear Politics	Safe R	November 7, 2006
CQ Politics	Safe R	November 7, 2006

==== Results ====
General Election 2006: Pennsylvania's 3rd congressional district
Party	Candidate	Votes	%
Republican	Phil English (incumbent)	108,525	53.64
Democratic	Steven Porter	85,110	42.06
Constitution	Timothy J. Hagberg	8,706	4.30
Total votes		202,341	100.00

== District 4 ==
2006 Pennsylvania's 4th congressional district election
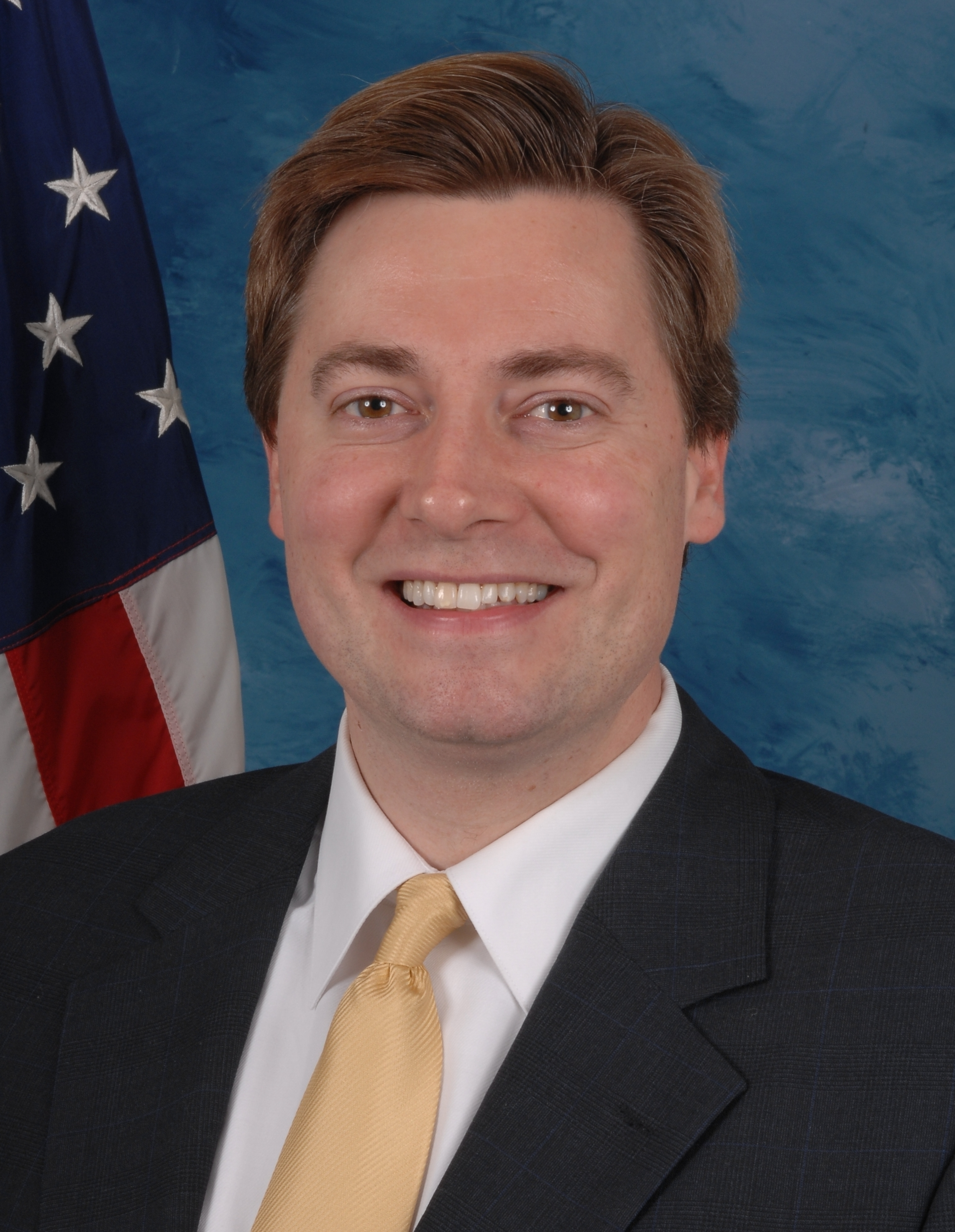

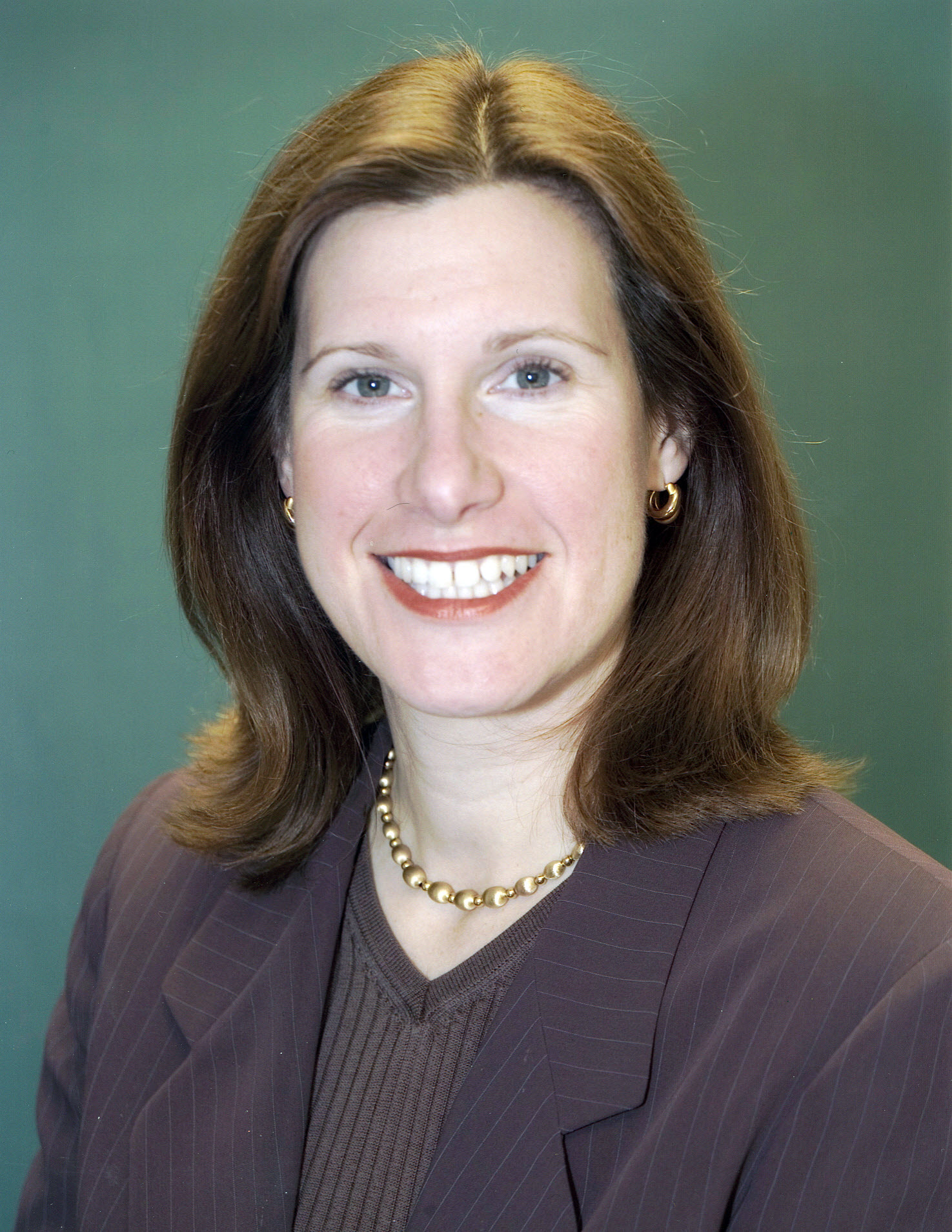
Nominee	Jason Altmire	Melissa Hart
Party	Democratic	Republican
Popular vote	131,847	122,049
Percentage	51.93%	48.07%
- County results Altmire: 50–60% 60–70% 70–80% Hart: 50–60% 60–70%
U.S. representative before election
Melissa Hart
Republican
Elected U.S. representative
Jason Altmire
Democratic

Incumbent U.S. Representative Melissa Hart was defeated by healthcare lobbyist Jason Altmire, taking 48.1% of the vote to Altmire's 51.9%.

=== Democratic primary ===
==== Candidates ====
===== Nominee =====
- Jason Altmire, healthcare lobbyist

==== Eliminated in primary ====
- Georgia Berner

==== Primary results ====
Democratic primary results
Party	Candidate	Votes	%
Democratic	Jason Altmire	32,322	54.86
Democratic	Georgia Berner	26,596	45.14
Total votes		58,918	100.00

=== Republican primary ===
==== Candidates ====
===== Nominee =====
- Melissa Hart, incumbent U.S. Representative

==== Primary results ====
Republican primary results
Party	Candidate	Votes	%
Republican	Melissa Hart (incumbent)	34,559	100.00
Total votes		34,559	100.00

=== General election ===
==== Predictions ====
Source	Ranking	As of
The Cook Political Report	Tossup	November 6, 2006
Rothenberg	Tossup	November 6, 2006
Sabato's Crystal Ball	Tilt R	November 6, 2006
Real Clear Politics	Lean R	November 7, 2006
CQ Politics	Lean R	November 7, 2006

==== Results ====
General Election 2006: Pennsylvania's 4th congressional district
Party	Candidate	Votes	%
Democratic	Jason Altmire	131,847	51.93
Republican	Melissa Hart (incumbent)	122,049	48.07
Total votes		253,896	100.00

== District 5 ==
2006 Pennsylvania's 5th congressional district election
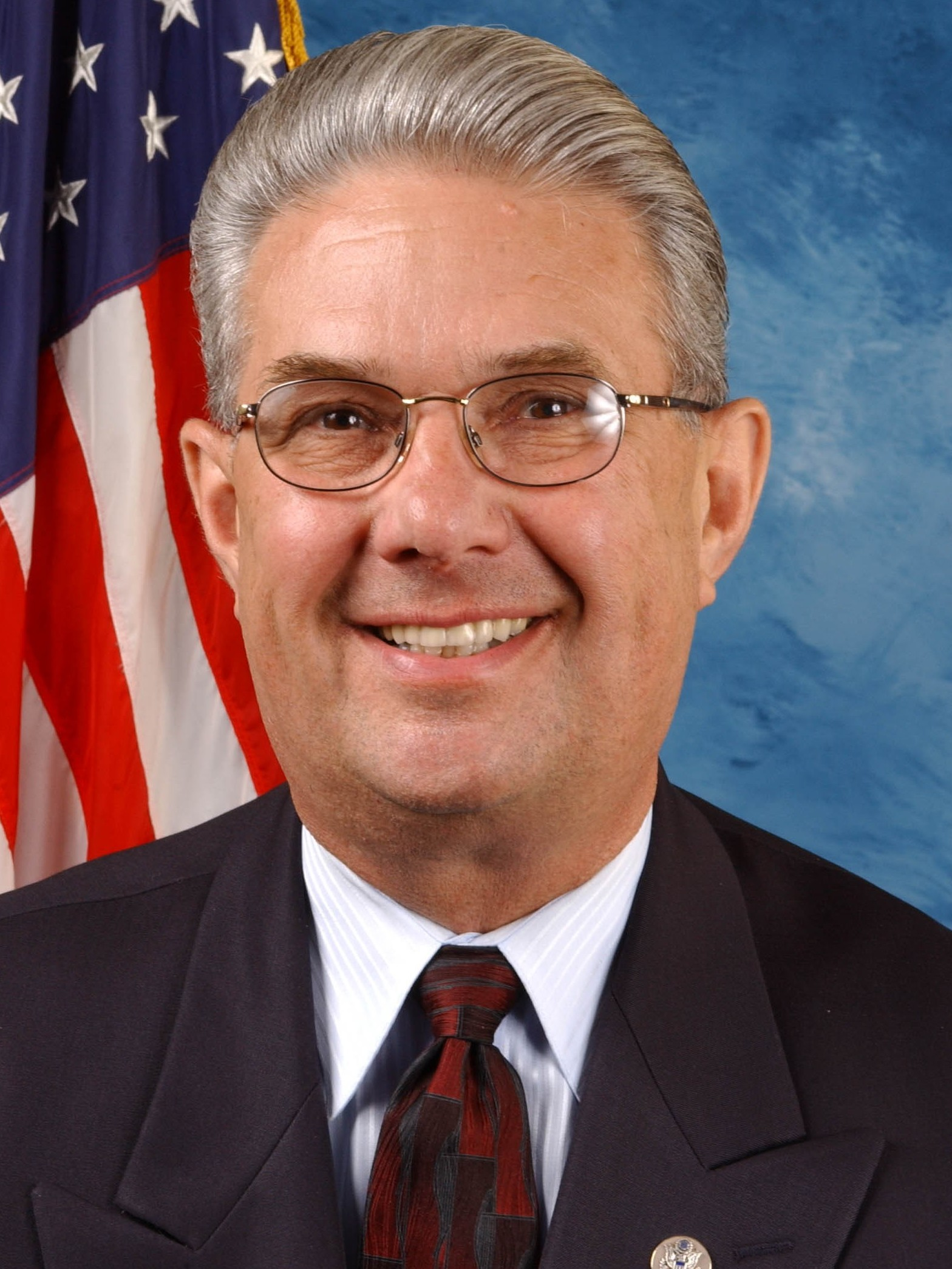

Nominee	John E. Peterson	Donald L. Hilliard
Party	Republican	Democratic
Popular vote	115,126	76,456
Percentage	60.09%	39.91%
- County results Peterson: 50–60% 60–70% 70–80%
U.S. representative before election
John E. Peterson
Republican
Elected U.S. representative
John E. Peterson
Republican

Incumbent Representative John E. Peterson was re-elected with 60.1% of the vote.

=== Democratic primary ===
==== Candidates ====
===== Nominee =====
- Donald L. Hilliard

==== Primary results ====
Democratic primary results
Party	Candidate	Votes	%
Democratic	Donald L. Hilliard	28,715	100.00
Total votes		28,715	100.00

=== Republican primary ===
==== Candidates ====
===== Nominee =====
- John E. Peterson, incumbent U.S. Representative

==== Primary results ====
Republican primary results
Party	Candidate	Votes	%
Republican	John E. Peterson (incumbent)	44,827	100.00
Total votes		44,827	100.00

=== General election ===
==== Predictions ====
Source	Ranking	As of
The Cook Political Report	Safe R	November 6, 2006
Rothenberg	Safe R	November 6, 2006
Sabato's Crystal Ball	Safe R	November 6, 2006
Real Clear Politics	Safe R	November 7, 2006
CQ Politics	Safe R	November 7, 2006

==== Results ====
General Election 2006: Pennsylvania's 5th congressional district
Party	Candidate	Votes	%
Republican	John E. Peterson (incumbent)	115,126	60.09
Democratic	Donald L. Hilliard	76,456	39.91
Total votes		191,582	100.00

== District 6 ==
2006 Pennsylvania's 6th congressional district election
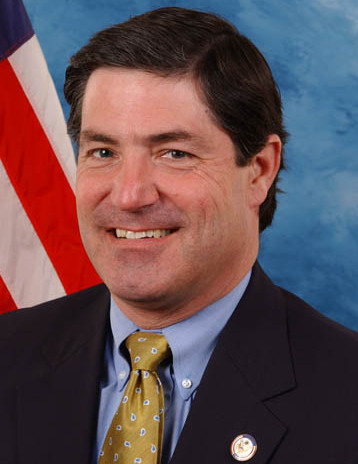

Nominee	Jim Gerlach	Lois Murphy
Party	Republican	Democratic
Popular vote	121,047	117,892
Percentage	50.66%	49.34%
- County results Gerlach: 50–60% Murphy: 50–60%
U.S. representative before election
Jim Gerlach
Republican
Elected U.S. representative
Jim Gerlach
Republican

In the Pennsylvania 6th congressional district election, incumbent Republican Jim Gerlach defeated Democratic opponent Lois Murphy by a 50.7%–49.3% margin to secure a third term. This was a rematch of the 2004 election, when Gerlach defeated Murphy by a similarly close margin. In the primary election, Gerlach was unopposed and Lois Murphy defeated developer Mike Leibowitz.

The candidates participated in two debates in October. The first, sponsored by the AARP focused on Social Security, healthcare, Iraq, and taxes. The second debate, airing on WPVI, focused on Iraq. Murphy outspent Gerlach by a margin of $4,097,663 to $3,492,402.

=== Democratic primary ===
==== Nominee ====
- Lois Murphy

==== Eliminated in primary ====
- Mike Leibowitz, developer

==== Primary results ====
Democratic primary results
Party	Candidate	Votes	%
Democratic	Lois Murphy	22,242	76.16
Democratic	Mike Leibowitz	6,961	23.84
Total votes		29,203	100.0

=== Republican primary ===
==== Nominee ====
- Jim Gerlach, incumbent U.S. Representative

==== Primary results ====
Republican primary results
Party	Candidate	Votes	%
Republican	Jim Gerlach (incumbent)	30,088	100.00
Total votes		30,088	100.00

=== General election ===
==== Predictions ====
Source	Ranking	As of
The Cook Political Report	Tossup	November 6, 2006
Rothenberg	Tossup	November 6, 2006
Sabato's Crystal Ball	Lean D (flip)	November 6, 2006
Real Clear Politics	Tossup	November 7, 2006
CQ Politics	Tossup	November 7, 2006

==== Results ====
General Election 2006: Pennsylvania's 6th congressional district
Party	Candidate	Votes	%
Republican	Jim Gerlach (incumbent)	121,047	50.66
Democratic	Lois Murphy	117,892	49.34
Total votes		238,939	100.00

== District 7 ==
2006 Pennsylvania's 7th congressional district election
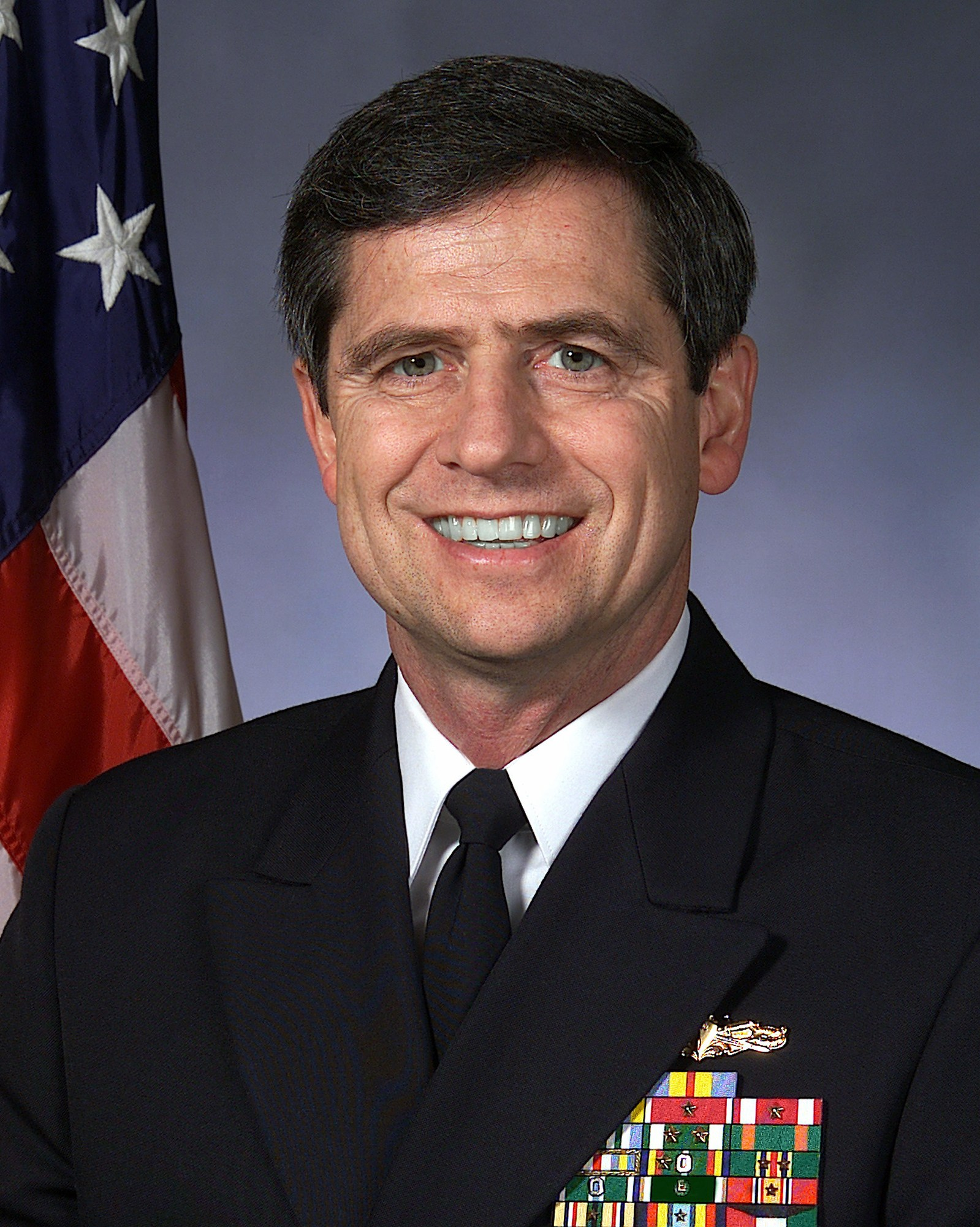

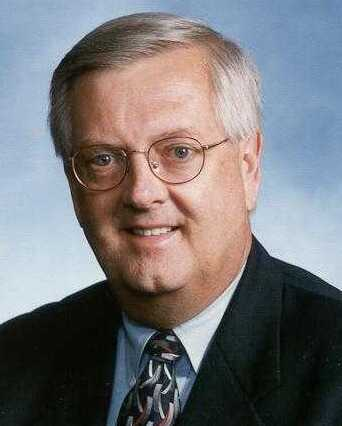
Nominee	Joe Sestak	Curt Weldon
Party	Democratic	Republican
Popular vote	147,898	114,426
Percentage	56.38%	43.62%
- County results Sestak: 50–60% 60–70%
U.S. representative before election
Curt Weldon
Republican
Elected U.S. representative
Joe Sestak
Democratic

In the Pennsylvania 7th congressional district election, long-time incumbent Republican Curt Weldon was defeated by retired Navy 3-star admiral Joe Sestak. Prior to the primary election, Iraq war veteran Bryan Lentz agreed to drop his bid for the seat held by Weldon, instead running for a Pennsylvania state legislature seat, a move brokered by Governor Ed Rendell. Lentz had raised about $125,000 for his congressional campaign. Haverford Democrat Paul Scoles, who ran poorly funded race against Weldon in 2004, also backed out in early February, throwing his support behind Sestak.

Pennsylvania's 7th congressional district, covering the suburbs west of Philadelphia, was one of the districts where John Kerry outpolled Bush in the 2004 election, which nonetheless elected a Republican to the House. As such, it became the target of Democratic strategists; in 2006 the Democrats fielded a much stronger and vastly better-funded challenger. On October 13, the media reported that Weldon and his daughter were being investigated by the FBI for their involvement with two Russian energy companies and a Serbian company connected with Slobodan Milosevic. The investigation focused on the lobbying firm Solutions North America owned and run by daughter Karen Weldon and local Republican operative Charlie Sexton, which was hired for $1 million, and whether Weldon was involved in obtaining the contracts or was lobbied by his daughter's firm. Three days later, FBI agents raided the home of Weldon's daughter, Karen, as well as five other locations of Weldon associates in Pennsylvania and Florida as part of the investigation. On October 17, 2006, The Philadelphia Inquirer reported that Weldon "acknowledged yesterday that he was under investigation."

On October 13, 2006, CQPolitics changed their rating on the race, from "Leans Republican" to the highly competitive "No Clear Favorite." This was the second time CQPolitics changed its rating in the match-up; in July, it reclassified the race from "Republican Favored" to the more competitive "Leans Republican." They subsequently noted, however, that this change was made the day before the media reported that the FBI was investigating Weldon and his daughter. Shortly after the raid, CQPolitics.com changed their rating on this race for a third time, this time from "No Clear Favorite" to "Leans Democratic".

=== Democratic primary ===
==== Nominee ====
- Joe Sestak, U.S. Navy vice admiral

==== Primary results ====
Democratic primary results
Party	Candidate	Votes	%
Democratic	Joe Sestak	17,616	100.00
Total votes		17,616	100.00

=== Republican primary ===
==== Nominee ====
- Curt Weldon, incumbent U.S. Representative

==== Primary results ====
Republican primary results
Party	Candidate	Votes	%
Republican	Curt Weldon (incumbent)	35,604	100.00
Total votes		35,604	100.00

=== General election ===
==== Endorsements ====
Joe Sestak (D)

Individuals

- Wesley Clark, General, 2004 democratic presidential candidate

==== Predictions ====
Source	Ranking	As of
The Cook Political Report	Tossup	November 6, 2006
Rothenberg	Lean D (flip)	November 6, 2006
Sabato's Crystal Ball	Lean D (flip)	November 6, 2006
Real Clear Politics	Lean D (flip)	November 7, 2006
CQ Politics	Lean D (flip)	November 7, 2006

==== Results ====
General Election 2006: Pennsylvania's 7th congressional district
Party	Candidate	Votes	%
Democratic	Joe Sestak	147,898	56.38
Republican	Curt Weldon (incumbent)	114,426	43.62
Total votes		262,324	100.00

== District 8 ==
2006 Pennsylvania's 8th congressional district election
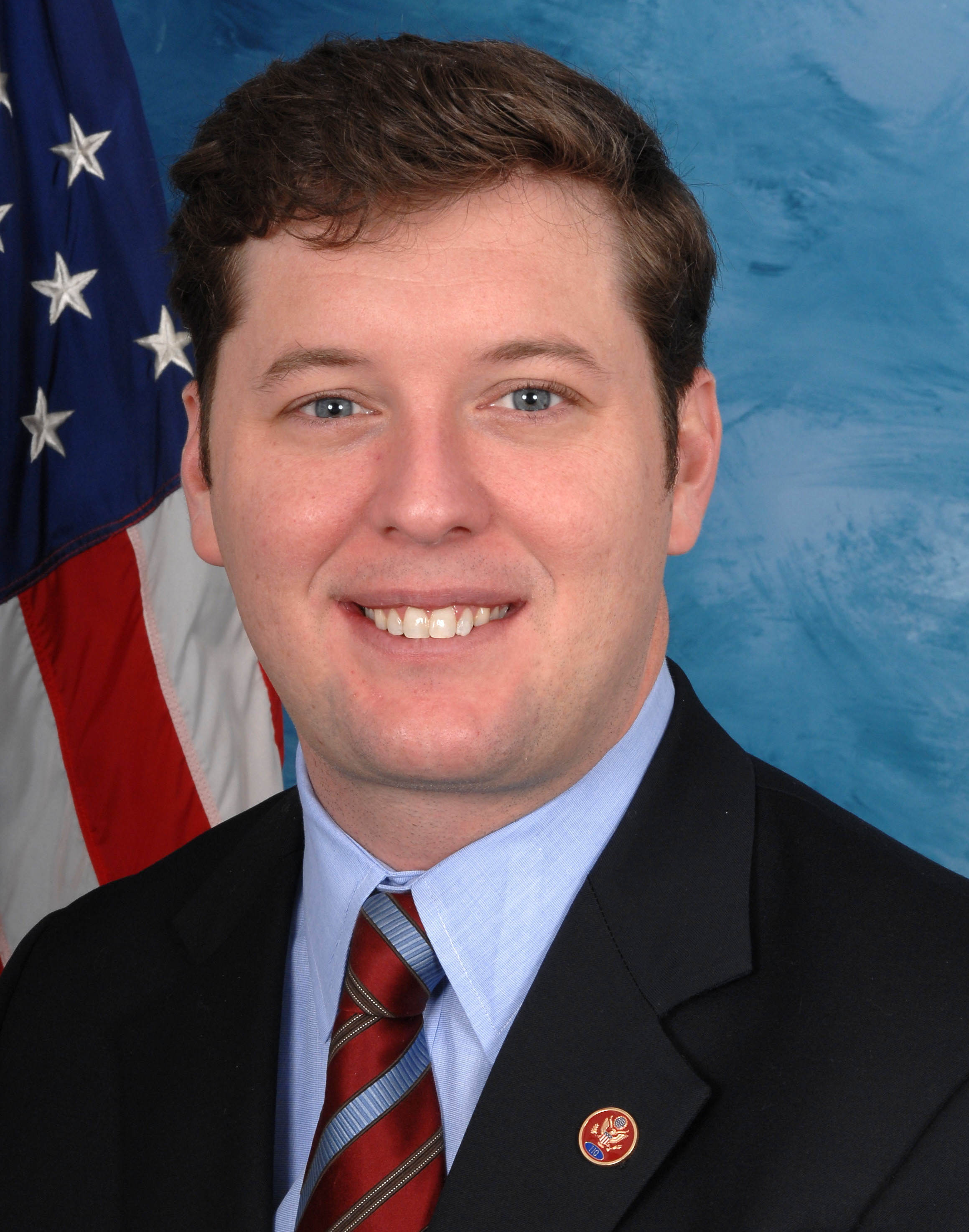

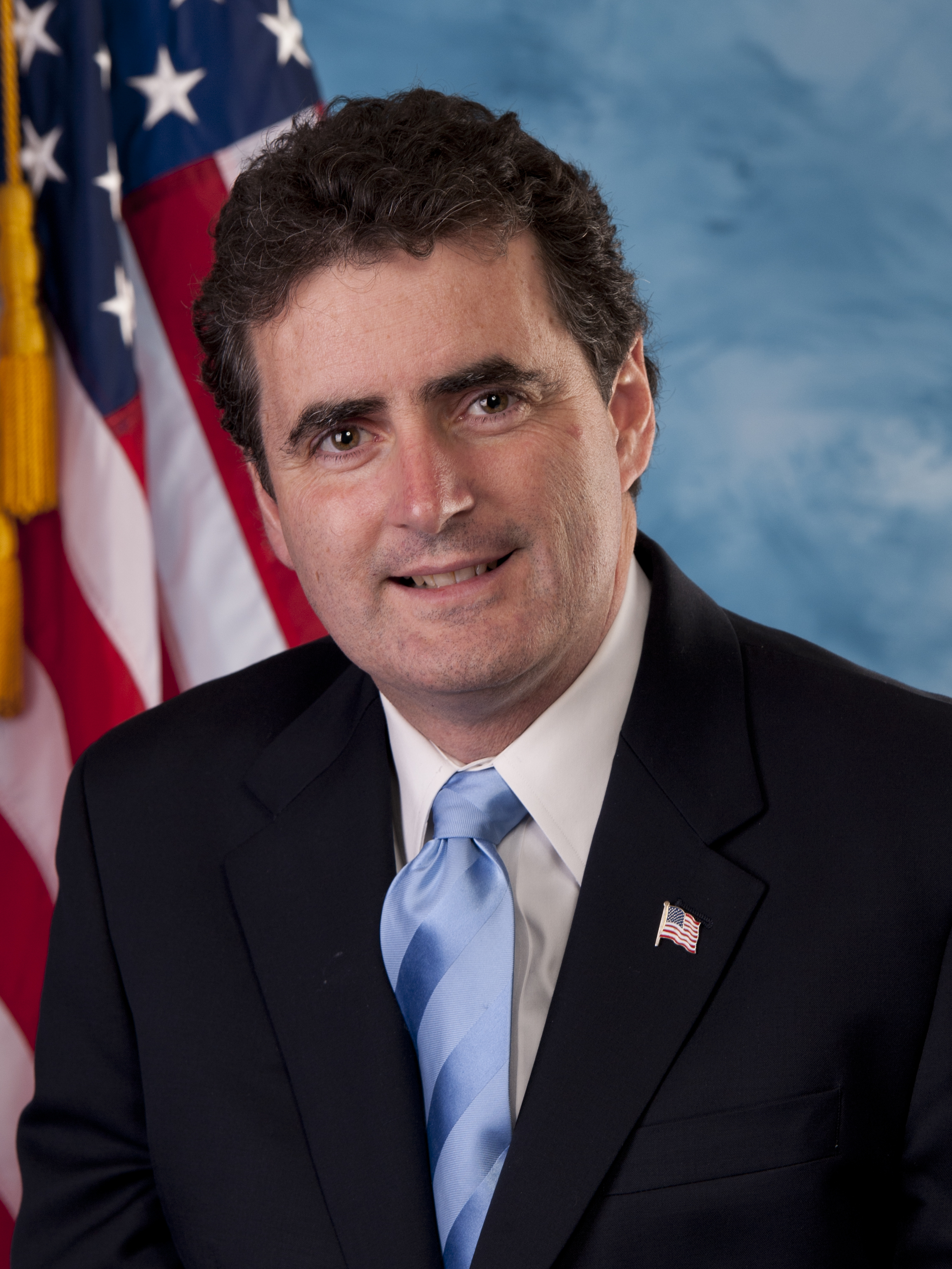
Nominee	Patrick Murphy	Mike Fitzpatrick
Party	Democratic	Republican
Popular vote	125,656	124,138
Percentage	50.30%	49.70%
- County results Murphy: 50–60% 60–70% Fitzpatrick: 50–60%
U.S. representative before election
Mike Fitzpatrick
Republican
Elected U.S. representative
Patrick Murphy
Democratic

=== Democratic primary ===
==== Nominee ====
- Patrick Murphy, attorney and Iraq War veteran

==== Eliminated in primary ====
- Andrew Warren, former Bucks County commissioner

==== Primary results ====
Democratic primary results
Party	Candidate	Votes	%
Democratic	Patrick Murphy	17,889	64.58
Democratic	Andrew Warren	9,812	35.42
Total votes		27,701	100.00

=== Republican primary ===
==== Nominee ====
- Mike Fitzpatrick, incumbent U.S. Representative

==== Primary results ====
Republican primary results
Party	Candidate	Votes	%
Republican	Mike Fitzpatrick (incumbent)	22,862	100.00
Total votes		22,862	100.00

=== General election ===
==== Endorsements ====
Patrick J. Murphy (D)

Individuals

- Wesley Clark, General, 2004 democratic presidential candidate

==== Predictions ====
Source	Ranking	As of
The Cook Political Report	Tossup	November 6, 2006
Rothenberg	Tossup	November 6, 2006
Sabato's Crystal Ball	Tilt R	November 6, 2006
Real Clear Politics	Lean R	November 7, 2006
CQ Politics	Tossup	November 7, 2006

==== Results ====
General Election 2006: Pennsylvania's 8th congressional district
Party	Candidate	Votes	%
Democratic	Patrick J. Murphy	125,656	50.30
Republican	Mike Fitzpatrick (incumbent)	124,138	49.70
Total votes		249,794	100.00

== District 9 ==
2006 Pennsylvania's 9th congressional district election
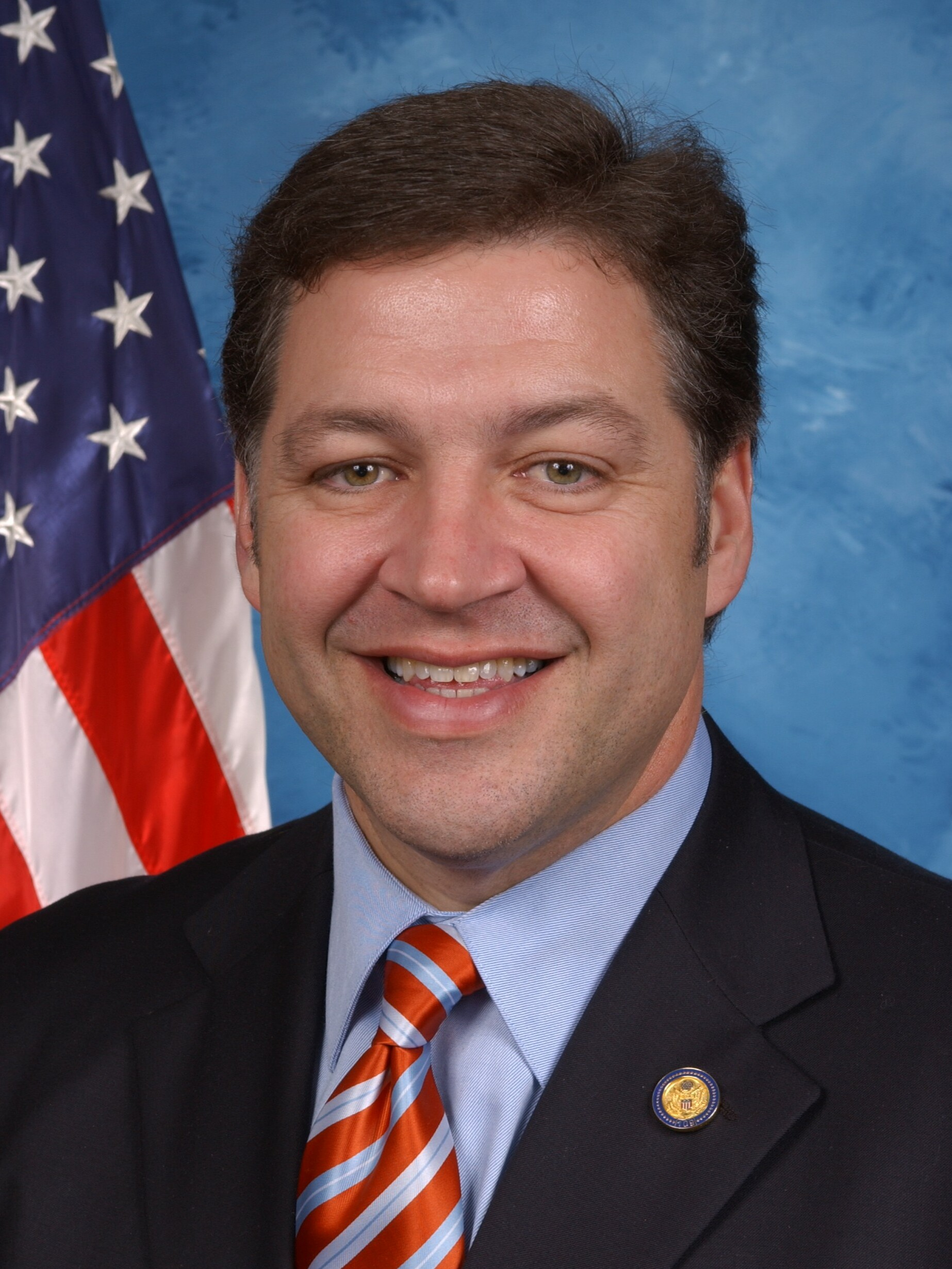

Nominee	Bill Shuster	Tony Barr
Party	Republican	Democratic
Popular vote	121,069	79,610
Percentage	60.33%	39.67%
- County results Shuster: 50–60% 60–70% Barr: 50–60%
U.S. representative before election
Bill Shuster
Republican
Elected U.S. representative
Bill Shuster
Republican

Incumbent Representative Bill Shuster was re-elected with 60.3% of the vote.

=== Republican primary ===
==== Nominee ====
- Bill Shuster, incumbent U.S. Representative

==== Primary results ====
Republican primary results
Party	Candidate	Votes	%
Republican	Bill Shuster (incumbent)	54,954	100.00
Total votes		54,954	100.00

=== General election ===
==== Predictions ====
Source	Ranking	As of
The Cook Political Report	Safe R	November 6, 2006
Rothenberg	Safe R	November 6, 2006
Sabato's Crystal Ball	Safe R	November 6, 2006
Real Clear Politics	Safe R	November 7, 2006
CQ Politics	Safe R	November 7, 2006

==== Results ====
General Election 2006: Pennsylvania's 9th congressional district
Party	Candidate	Votes	%
Republican	Bill Shuster (incumbent)	121,069	60.33
Democratic	Tony Barr	79,610	39.67
Total votes		200,679	100.00

== District 10 ==
2006 Pennsylvania's 10th congressional district election
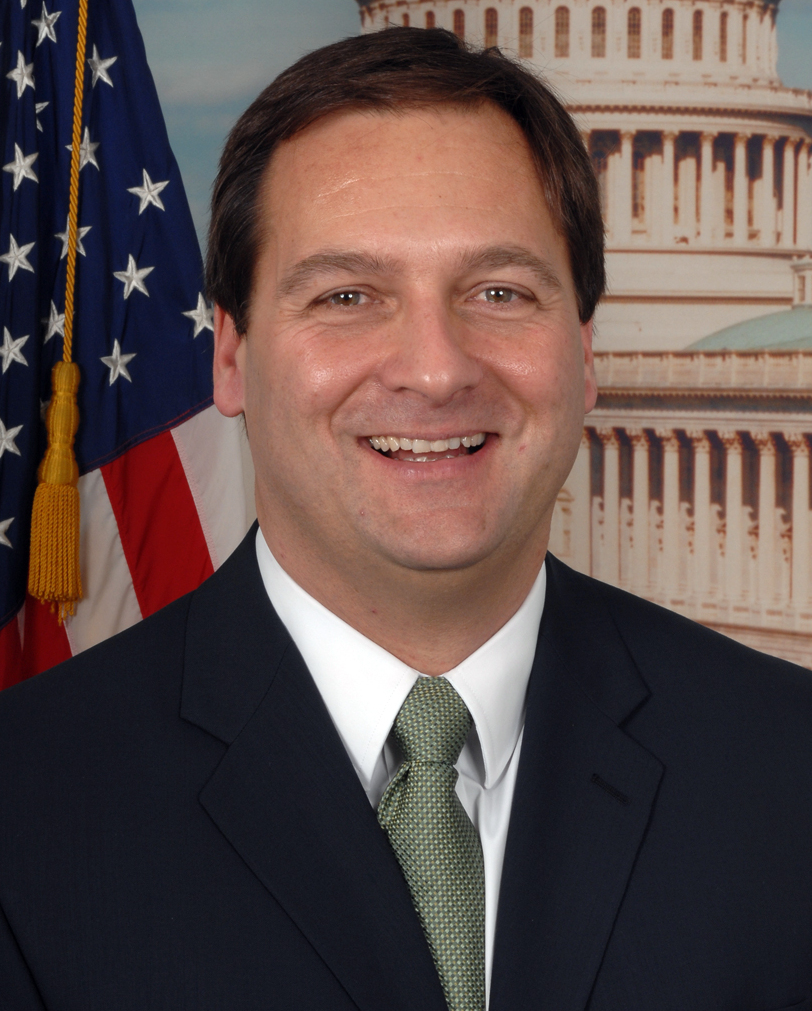

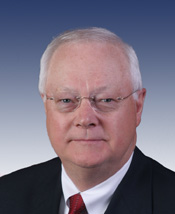
Nominee	Chris Carney	Don Sherwood
Party	Democratic	Republican
Popular vote	110,115	97,862
Percentage	52.95%	47.05%
- County results Carney: 50–60% 60–70% Sherwood: 50–60% 70–80%
U.S. representative before election
Don Sherwood
Republican
Elected U.S. representative
Chris Carney
Democratic

The 2006 Pennsylvania 10th congressional district election was held on November 7 to elect a representative from the Pennsylvania's 10th congressional district. Republican four-term incumbent Don Sherwood was defeated by Democrat Chris Carney, a former Defense Department consultant and Navy lieutenant commander.

CQPolitics noted that "[a]t the outset of the 2006 midterm campaign cycle, it would have been difficult to identify a more politically 'safe' member than Pennsylvania Rep. Don Sherwood. A four-term Republican from the strongly conservative 10th District in northeastern Pennsylvania, Sherwood had run unchallenged by Democrats in 2002 and 2004." But, he "enters the general election campaign in a weakened position mostly because of his extramarital relationship with a young woman, to which he publicly admitted last year. Sherwood, though, adamantly denied the woman's charges that he also physically abused her. A lawsuit brought by the woman against Sherwood was later settled."

On May 15, 2006, Sherwood survived a "surprisingly strong challenge" in the Republican primary from Kathy Scott, a political newcomer. Sherwood received 56% of the vote. CQPolitics reported that his "mediocre showing" could be attributed to the admitted affair. Scott did not file a report with the FEC, which indicates that she spent less than $5,000 in her campaign. His small margin of victory came despite the fact that, prior to the primary, Pennsylvania Senator Rick Santorum endorsed Sherwood and recorded an automated telephone call on Sherwood's behalf, as did President George W. Bush.

Sherwood's continuing problems resulting from the extramarital affair and Carney's nationally famous ads about it (in which actual residents of the district accuse Sherwood of having "no family values"), as well as polls that showed him 7 to 9 points behind, compelled Sherwood to respond with a television ad in which he directly apologized to voters for the affair, denied the allegations of physical abuse, and promised to continue what he said was his effective representation of the district if the voters were to forgive and re-elect him. However, the initial 2005 news about Sherwood admitting to an affair and being accused of choking the woman as well as the well-recognized Carney ads, which were described by the Associated Press as "hard-hitting", stuck with Sherwood's name throughout the campaign. Fallout for Sherwood continued, including charges that he voted against an increase in the minimum wage while hiking his own congressional income, a claim which the Congressman denounced as "bullshit", and for voting for the Central American Free Trade Agreement, which Carney said "sent Pennsylvanian jobs overseas." Sherwood fought back by labeling Carney a "liar" for the minimum wage charges and subsequently accused Carney of being a "liberal" for supposedly supporting tax increases. Carney shot back, accusing Sherwood of supporting tax cuts for the wealthy, while depriving the middle-class. Carol Sherwood, the Congressman's wife, wrote a letter to registered Republicans in the 10th District in which she lambasted Carney as someone who "gets some pleasure out of hurting our family" and stated that "I am certainly not condoning the mistake Don made, but I am not going to dwell on either." Simultaneously, President Bush made a visit to the area in October to Keystone College in La Plume Township, Pennsylvania to endorse Sherwood's run, a move which many believe might have hurt Sherwood when given Bush's declining popularity both nationwide and in the district. Bush supported Sherwood as "the right man to represent this district", to which the President drew uncertain applause from the audience, which included several empty tables. Coincidentally, Bush had deemed the week that he flew to Pennsylvania to help Sherwood as "National Character Counts Week", which propelled Carney to blast Bush as a hypocrite, stating he could not comprehend how President Bush could both endorse moral values and campaign for the affair-laden Sherwood in the same week. Simultaneously, Sherwood's campaign took a boost from a local newspaper, Times Leader, which ran a front-page headline in late October in which it accused Carney of "misrepresenting" quotes that were included in a Times Leader editorial page about Sherwood's extramarital affair. Meanwhile, Carney took pages from the Republican playbook by using the same tactics the GOP uses against Democrats to attack Sherwood, accusing the Congressman of having a "pre-9/11 mentality" on port security and of supporting amnesty for illegal immigrants, referring to President Bush's guest worker program for illegal immigration. Despite endorsements from Vice President Cheney, President Bush, and U.S. Senator Rick Santorum, Sherwood's campaign was surprisingly beaten in the financial spending wars by the Carney campaign. In the closing days of the campaign, last-minute news about new developments in a 2005 $500,000 deal with Sherwood's former mistress and accuser helped boost Carney, who had consistently played the trump card of "honor", "integrity", and "family values" in his campaign. Many voters also resonated with Carney's vague yet inspiring vow "to make Pennsylvania proud", a slogan that became very familiar to the 10th District, as well as his impressive record as a senior terrorism advisor in the Pentagon and his Navy service.

=== Democratic primary ===
==== Nominee ====
- Chris Carney, former Defense Department consultant and U.S. Navy lieutenant commander

==== Primary results ====
Democratic primary results
Party	Candidate	Votes	%
Democratic	Chris Carney	26,300	100.00
Total votes		26,300	100.00

=== Republican primary ===
==== Nominee ====
- Don Sherwood, incumbent U.S. Representative

==== Eliminated in primary ====
- Kathy Scott

==== Primary results ====
Republican primary results
Party	Candidate	Votes	%
Republican	Don Sherwood (incumbent)	31,434	56.30
Republican	Kathy Scott	24,396	43.70
Total votes		55,830	100.00

=== General election ===
==== Predictions ====
Source	Ranking	As of
The Cook Political Report	Tossup	November 6, 2006
Rothenberg	Lean D (flip)	November 6, 2006
Sabato's Crystal Ball	Lean D (flip)	November 6, 2006
Real Clear Politics	Lean D (flip)	November 7, 2006
CQ Politics	Lean D (flip)	November 7, 2006

==== Results ====
General Election 2006: Pennsylvania's 10th congressional district
Party	Candidate	Votes	%
Democratic	Chris Carney	110,115	52.95
Republican	Don Sherwood (incumbent)	97,862	47.05
Total votes		207,977	100.00

== District 11 ==
2006 Pennsylvania's 11th congressional district election
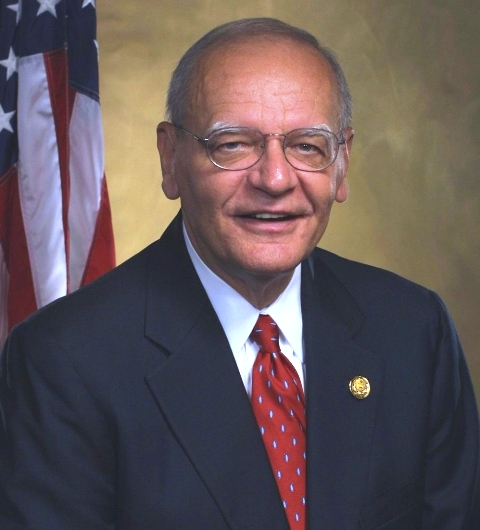

Nominee	Paul Kanjorski	Joseph F. Leonardi
Party	Democratic	Republican
Popular vote	134,340	51,033
Percentage	72.47%	27.53%
- County results Kanjorski: 60–70% 70–80% 80–90%
U.S. representative before election
Paul Kanjorski
Democratic
Elected U.S. representative
Paul Kanjorski
Democratic

Incumbent U.S. Representative Paul Kanjorski was re-elected with 72.5% of the vote.

=== Democratic primary ===
==== Nominee ====
- Paul Kanjorski, incumbent U.S. Representative

==== Primary results ====
Democratic primary results
Party	Candidate	Votes	%
Democratic	Paul Kanjorski (incumbent)	50,117	100.00
Total votes		50,117	100.00

=== Republican primary ===
==== Nominee ====
- Joseph F. Leonardi

==== Primary results ====
Republican primary results
Party	Candidate	Votes	%
Republican	Joseph F. Leonardi	18,910	100.00
Total votes		18,910	100.00

=== General election ===
==== Predictions ====
Source	Ranking	As of
The Cook Political Report	Safe D	November 6, 2006
Rothenberg	Safe D	November 6, 2006
Sabato's Crystal Ball	Safe D	November 6, 2006
Real Clear Politics	Safe D	November 7, 2006
CQ Politics	Safe D	November 7, 2006

==== Results ====
General Election 2006: Pennsylvania's 11th congressional district
Party	Candidate	Votes	%
Democratic	Paul E. Kanjorski (incumbent)	134,340	72.47
Republican	Joseph F. Leonardi	51,033	27.53
Total votes		185,373	100.00

== District 12 ==
2006 Pennsylvania's 12th congressional district election
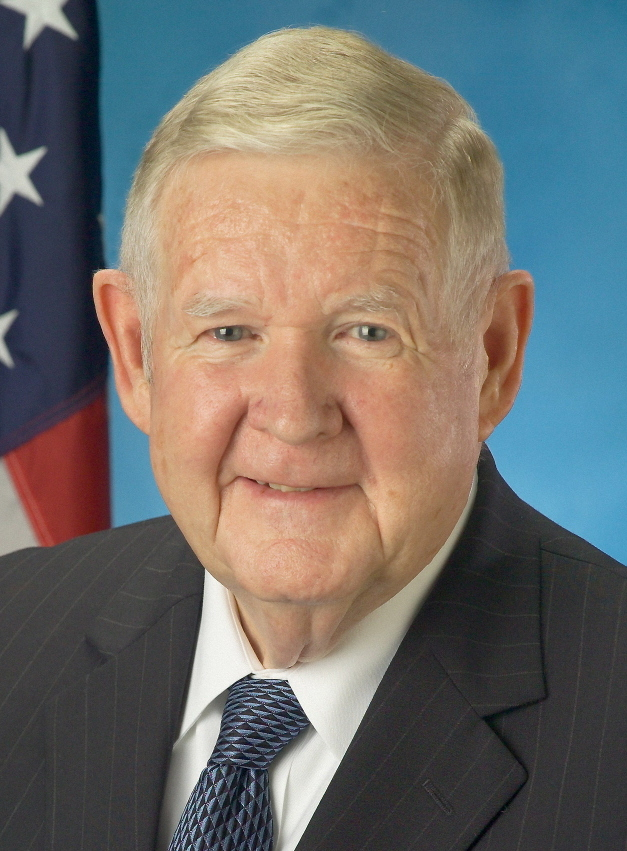

Nominee	John Murtha	Diana Irey
Party	Democratic	Republican
Popular vote	123,472	79,612
Percentage	60.8%	39.2%
- County results Murtha: 50–60% 60–70%
U.S. representative before election
John P. Murtha
Democratic
Elected U.S. representative
John P. Murtha
Democratic

Incumbent U.S. Representative John Murtha was re-elected with 60.8% of the vote.

=== Democratic primary ===
==== Nominee ====
- John Murtha, incumbent U.S. Representative

==== Primary results ====
Democratic primary results
Party	Candidate	Votes	%
Democratic	John Murtha (incumbent)	60,376	100.00
Total votes		60,376	100.00

=== Republican primary ===
==== Nominee ====
- Diana Irey

==== Primary results ====
Democratic primary results
Party	Candidate	Votes	%
Republican	Diana Irey	21,619	100.00
Total votes		21,619	100.00

=== General election ===
==== Predictions ====
Source	Ranking	As of
The Cook Political Report	Safe D	November 6, 2006
Rothenberg	Safe D	November 6, 2006
Sabato's Crystal Ball	Safe D	November 6, 2006
Real Clear Politics	Safe D	November 7, 2006
CQ Politics	Safe D	November 7, 2006

==== Results ====
General Election 2006: Pennsylvania's 12th congressional district
Party	Candidate	Votes	%
Democratic	John Murtha (incumbent)	123,472	60.80
Republican	Diana Irey	79,612	39.20
Total votes		203,084	100.00

== District 13 ==
2006 Pennsylvania's 13th congressional district election
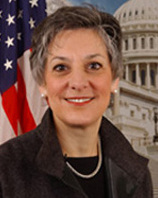

Nominee	Allyson Schwartz	Raj Peter Bhakta
Party	Democratic	Republican
Popular vote	147,368	75,492
Percentage	66.13%	33.87%
- County results Schwartz: 60–70%
U.S. representative before election
Allyson Schwartz
Democratic
Elected U.S. representative
Allyson Schwartz
Democratic

=== Democratic primary ===
==== Nominee ====
- Allyson Schwartz, incumbent U.S. Representative

==== Primary results ====
Democratic primary results
Party	Candidate	Votes	%
Democratic	Allyson Schwartz (incumbent)	22,877	100.00
Total votes		22,877	100.00

=== Republican primary ===
==== Nominee ====
- Raj Peter Bhakta, entrepreneur and media personality

==== Primary results ====
Republican primary results
Party	Candidate	Votes	%
Republican	Raj Peter Bhakta	17,042	100.00
Total votes		17,042	100.00

=== General election ===
==== Predictions ====
Source	Ranking	As of
The Cook Political Report	Safe D	November 6, 2006
Rothenberg	Safe D	November 6, 2006
Sabato's Crystal Ball	Safe D	November 6, 2006
Real Clear Politics	Safe D	November 7, 2006
CQ Politics	Safe D	November 7, 2006

==== Results ====
General Election 2006: Pennsylvania's 13th congressional district
Party	Candidate	Votes	%
Democratic	Allyson Schwartz (incumbent)	147,368	66.13
Republican	Raj Peter Bhakta	75,492	33.87
Total votes		222,860	100.00

== District 14 ==
2006 Pennsylvania's 14th congressional district election
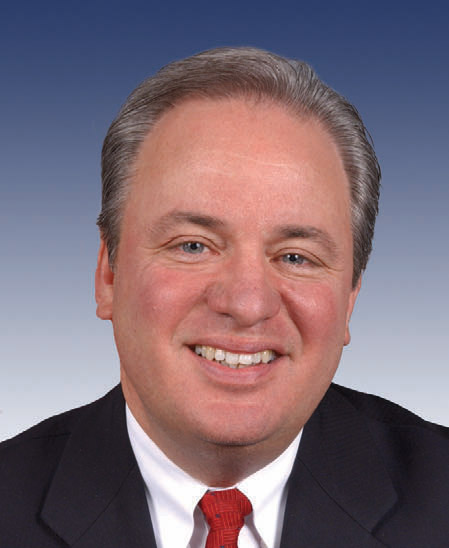

Nominee	Mike Doyle	Titus North
Party	Democratic	Green
Popular vote	161,075	17,720
Percentage	90.09%	9.91%
- County results Doyle: 90–100%
U.S. representative before election
Mike Doyle
Democratic
Elected U.S. representative
Mike Doyle
Democratic

=== Democratic primary ===
==== Nominee ====
- Mike Doyle, incumbent U.S. Representative

==== Eliminated in primary ====
- Mike Isaac

==== Primary results ====
Democratic primary results
Party	Candidate	Votes	%
Democratic	Mike Doyle (incumbent)	54,213	75.92
Democratic	Mike Isaac	17,193	24.08
Total votes		71,406	100.00

=== General election ===
==== Predictions ====
Source	Ranking	As of
The Cook Political Report	Safe D	November 6, 2006
Rothenberg	Safe D	November 6, 2006
Sabato's Crystal Ball	Safe D	November 6, 2006
Real Clear Politics	Safe D	November 7, 2006
CQ Politics	Safe D	November 7, 2006

==== Results ====
General Election 2006: Pennsylvania's 14th congressional district
Party	Candidate	Votes	%
Democratic	Mike Doyle (incumbent)	161,075	90.09
Green	Titus North	17,720	9.91
Total votes		178,795	100.00

== District 15 ==
2006 Pennsylvania's 15th congressional district election
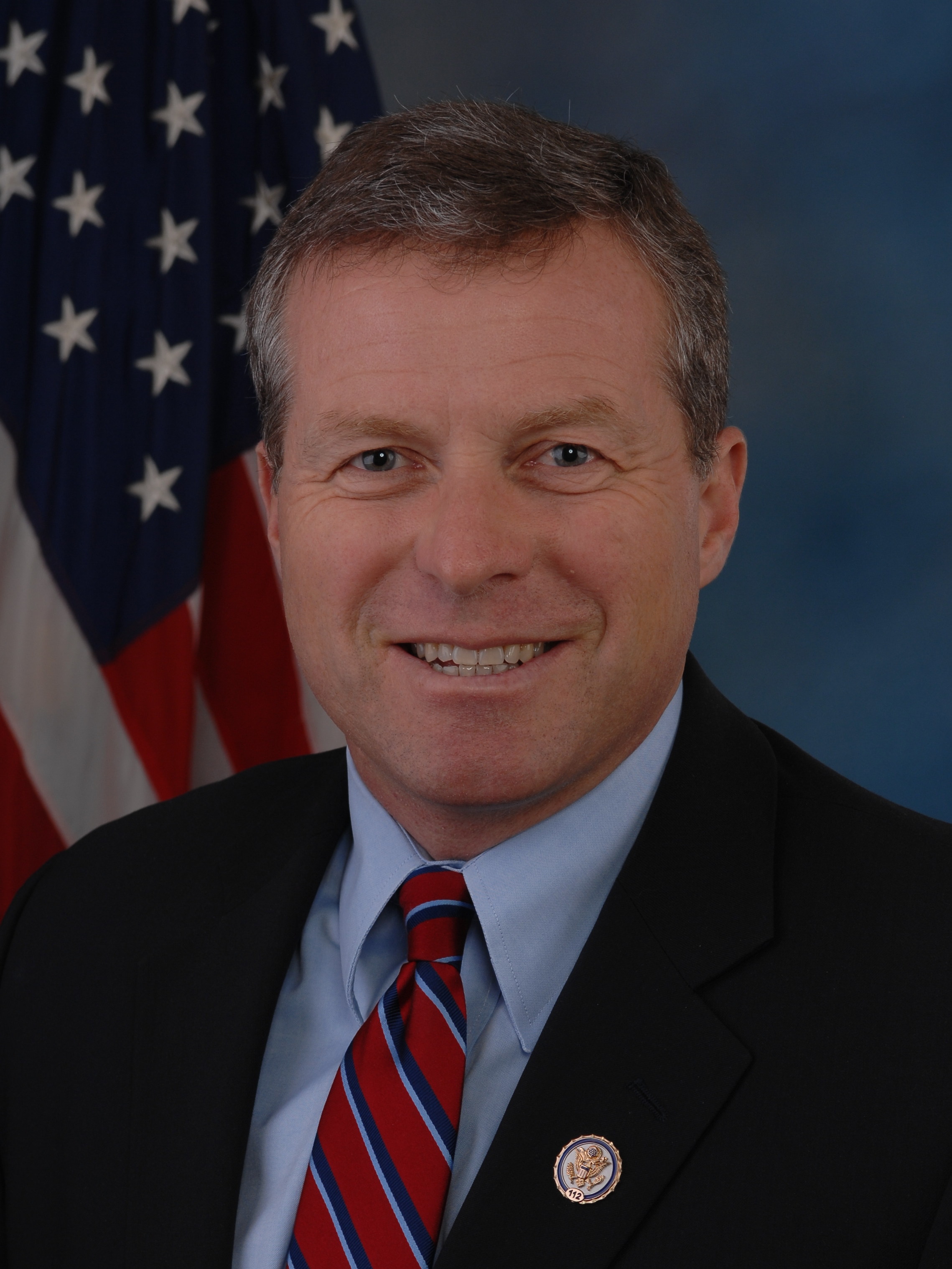

Nominee	Charlie Dent	Charles Dertinger
Party	Republican	Democratic
Popular vote	106,153	86,186
Percentage	53.57%	43.50%
- County results Dent: 50–60%
U.S. representative before election
Charlie Dent
Republican
Elected U.S. representative
Charlie Dent
Republican

=== Republican primary ===
==== Nominee ====
- Charlie Dent, incumbent U.S. Representative

==== Primary results ====
Republican primary results
Party	Candidate	Votes	%
Republican	Charlie Dent (incumbent)	18,858	100.00
Total votes		18,858	100.00

=== General election ===
==== Predictions ====
Source	Ranking	As of
The Cook Political Report	Safe R	November 6, 2006
Rothenberg	Safe R	November 6, 2006
Sabato's Crystal Ball	Safe R	November 6, 2006
Real Clear Politics	Safe R	November 7, 2006
CQ Politics	Safe R	November 7, 2006

==== Results ====
General Election 2006: Pennsylvania's 15th congressional district
Party	Candidate	Votes	%
Republican	Charlie Dent (incumbent)	106,153	53.57
Democratic	Charles Dertinger	86,186	43.50
Green	Greta Browne	5,802	2.93
Total votes		198,141	100.00

== District 16 ==
2006 Pennsylvania's 16th congressional district election
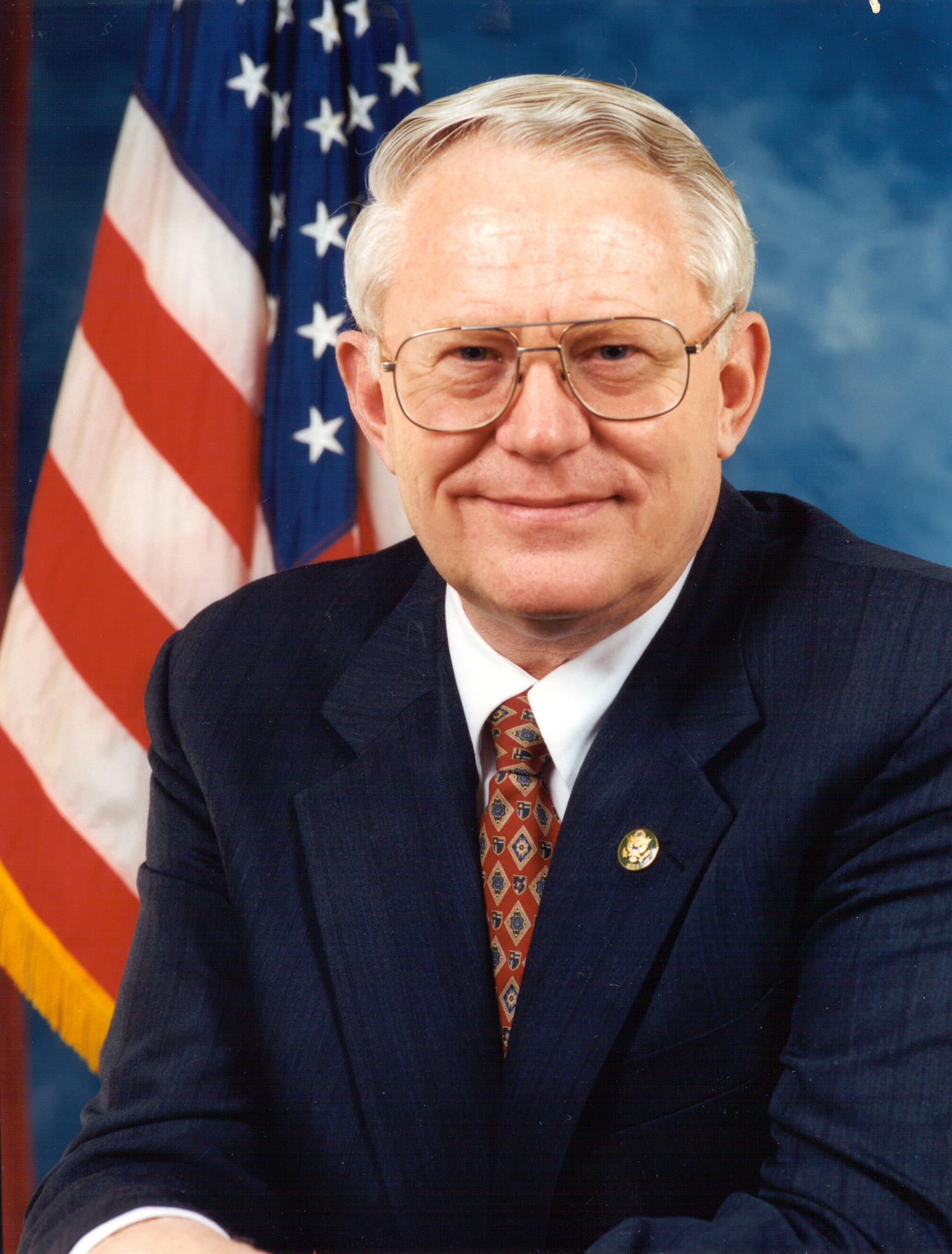

Nominee	Joe Pitts	Lois Herr
Party	Republican	Democratic
Popular vote	115,741	80,915
Percentage	56.57%	39.54%
- County results Pitts: 50–60% Herr: 50–60%
U.S. representative before election
Joe Pitts
Republican
Elected U.S. representative
Joe Pitts
Republican

=== Democratic primary ===
==== Nominee ====
- Lois Herr, activist and 2004 Democratic Party nominee

==== Primary results ====
Democratic primary results
Party	Candidate	Votes	%
Democratic	Lois Herr	15,442	100.00
Total votes		15,442	100.00

=== Republican primary ===
==== Nominee ====
- Joe Pitts, incumbent U.S. Representative

==== Primary results ====
Republican primary results
Party	Candidate	Votes	%
Republican	Joe Pitts (incumbent)	46,273	100.00
Total votes		46,273	100.00

=== General election ===
==== Predictions ====
Source	Ranking	As of
The Cook Political Report	Safe R	November 6, 2006
Rothenberg	Safe R	November 6, 2006
Sabato's Crystal Ball	Safe R	November 6, 2006
Real Clear Politics	Safe R	November 7, 2006
CQ Politics	Safe R	November 7, 2006

==== Results ====
General Election 2006: Pennsylvania's 16th congressional district
Party	Candidate	Votes	%
Republican	Joe Pitts (incumbent)	115,741	56.57
Democratic	Lois Herr	80,915	39.54
Independent	John A. Murphy	7,958	3.89
Total votes		204,614	100.00

== District 17 ==
2006 Pennsylvania's 17th congressional district election
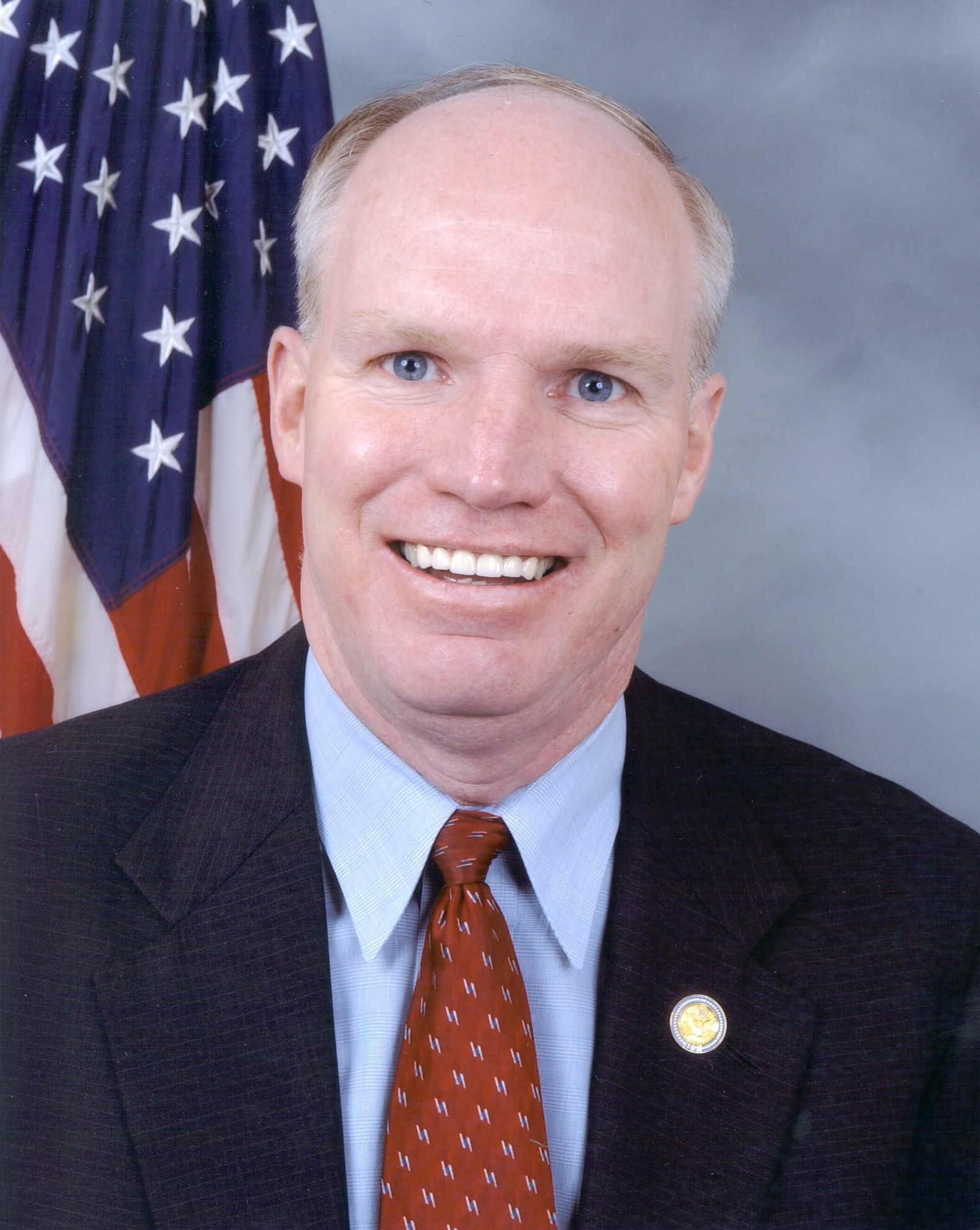

Nominee	Tim Holden	Matthew A. Wertz
Party	Democratic	Republican
Popular vote	137,253	75,455
Percentage	64.53%	33.47%
- County results Holden: 50–60% 60–70% 70–80% Wertz: 50–60%
U.S. representative before election
Tim Holden
Democratic
Elected U.S. representative
Tim Holden
Democratic

Incumbent Representative Tim Holden was re-elected with 64.5% of the vote.

=== Democratic primary ===
==== Nominee ====
- Tim Holden, incumbent U.S. Representative

==== Primary results ====
Democratic primary results
Party	Candidate	Votes	%
Democratic	Tim Holden (incumbent)	28,720	100.00
Total votes		28,720	100.00

=== Republican primary ===
==== Nominee ====
- Matthew A. Wertz

==== Primary results ====
Republican primary results
Party	Candidate	Votes	%
Republican	Matthew A. Wertz	43,329	100.00
Total votes		43,329	100.00

=== General election ===
==== Predictions ====
Source	Ranking	As of
The Cook Political Report	Safe D	November 6, 2006
Rothenberg	Safe D	November 6, 2006
Sabato's Crystal Ball	Safe D	November 6, 2006
Real Clear Politics	Safe D	November 7, 2006
CQ Politics	Safe D	November 7, 2006

==== Results ====
General Election 2006: Pennsylvania's 17th congressional district
Party	Candidate	Votes	%
Democratic	Tim Holden (incumbent)	137,253	64.53
Republican	Matthew A. Wertz	75,455	33.47
Total votes		212,708	100.00

== District 18 ==
2006 Pennsylvania's 18th congressional district election
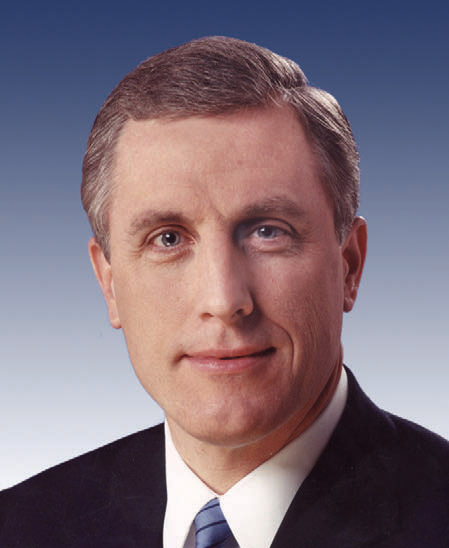

Nominee	Tim Murphy	Chad Kluko
Party	Republican	Democratic
Popular vote	144,632	105,419
Percentage	57.84%	42.16%
- County results Murphy: 50–60% 60–70%
U.S. representative before election
Tim Murphy
Republican
Elected U.S. representative
Tim Murphy
Republican

=== Democratic primary ===
==== Nominee ====
- Chad Kluko

==== Eliminated in primary ====
- Thomas Kovach

==== Primary results ====
Democratic primary results
Party	Candidate	Votes	%
Democratic	Chad Kluko	27,851	52.92
Democratic	Thomas Kovach	24,779	47.08
Total votes		52,630	100.00

=== Republican primary ===
==== Nominee ====
- Tim Murphy, incumbent U.S. Representative

==== Primary results ====
Republican primary results
Party	Candidate	Votes	%
Republican	Tim Murphy (incumbent)	33,195	100.00
Total votes		33,195	100.00

=== General election ===
==== Predictions ====
Source	Ranking	As of
The Cook Political Report	Safe R	November 6, 2006
Rothenberg	Safe R	November 6, 2006
Sabato's Crystal Ball	Safe R	November 6, 2006
Real Clear Politics	Safe R	November 7, 2006
CQ Politics	Safe R	November 7, 2006

==== Results ====
General Election 2006: Pennsylvania's 18th congressional district
Party	Candidate	Votes	%
Republican	Tim Murphy (incumbent)	144,632	57.84
Democratic	Chad Kluko	105,419	42.16
Total votes		250,051	100.00

== District 19 ==
2006 Pennsylvania's 19th congressional district election
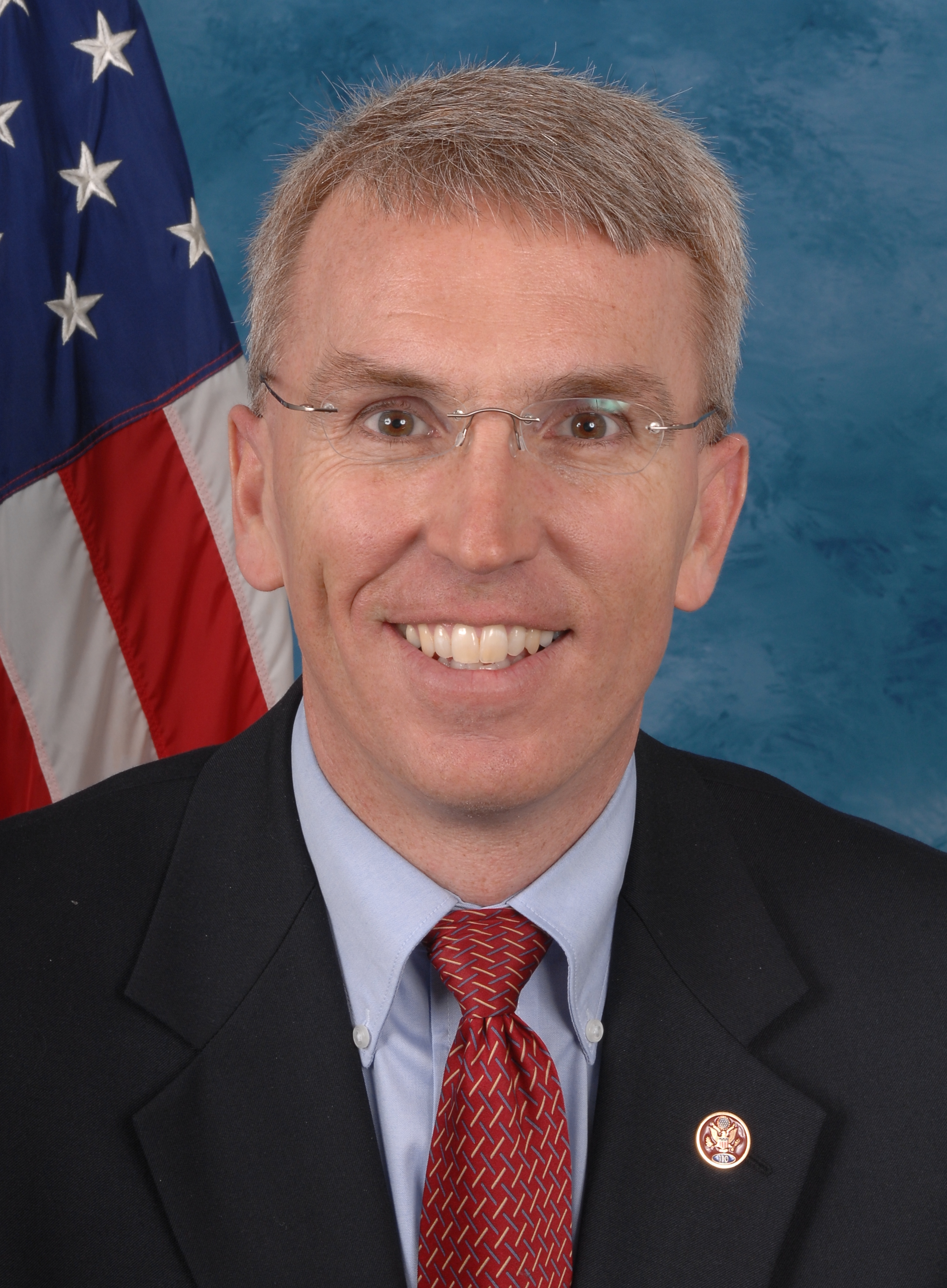

Nominee	Todd Platts	Philip J. Avillo Jr.
Party	Republican	Democratic
Popular vote	142,512	74,625
Percentage	63.97%	33.50%
- County results Platts: 60–70%
U.S. representative before election
Todd Platts
Republican
Elected U.S. representative
Todd Platts
Republican

Incumbent Representative Todd Platts was re-elected with 64.0% of the vote.

=== Democratic primary ===
==== Nominee ====
- Philip J. Avillo Jr., college professor

==== Primary results ====
Democratic primary results
Party	Candidate	Votes	%
Democratic	Philip J. Avillo Jr.	21,862	100.00
Total votes		21,862	100.00

=== Republican primary ===
==== Nominee ====
- Todd Platts, incumbent U.S. Representative

==== Primary results ====
Republican primary results
Party	Candidate	Votes	%
Republican	Todd Platts (incumbent)	43,180	100.00
Total votes		43,180	100.00

=== General election ===
==== Predictions ====
Source	Ranking	As of
The Cook Political Report	Safe R	November 6, 2006
Rothenberg	Safe R	November 6, 2006
Sabato's Crystal Ball	Safe R	November 6, 2006
Real Clear Politics	Safe R	November 7, 2006
CQ Politics	Safe R	November 7, 2006

==== Results ====
General Election 2006: Pennsylvania's 19th congressional district
Party	Candidate	Votes	%
Republican	Todd Platts (incumbent)	142,512	63.97
Democratic	Philip J. Avillo, Jr.	74,625	33.50
Green	Derf W. Maitland	5,640	2.53
Total votes		222,777	100.00

== See also ==
- Pennsylvania's congressional delegations
- 108th United States Congress
