= Responsibly And Professionally Invigorating Development Act of 2013 =

- Long title: To provide for improved coordination of agency actions in the preparation and adoption of environmental documents for permitting determinations, and for other purposes.
- Announced in: the 113th United States Congress
- Sponsored by: Rep. Tom Marino (R, PA-10)
- Number of co-sponsors: 6

Codification
- Acts affected: National Environmental Policy Act of 1969, Moving Ahead for Progress in the 21st Century Act
- U.S.C. sections affected: 5 U.S.C. § 560, 5 U.S.C. ch. 5, 42 U.S.C. § 4321 et seq., 49 U.S.C. § 5303, 23 U.S.C. § 135, and others.
- Agencies affected: Council on Environmental Quality, United States Congress

Legislative history
- Introduced in the House as H.R. 2641 by Rep. Tom Marino (R, PA-10) on July 10, 2013; Committee consideration by United States House Committee on the Judiciary, United States House Committee on Natural Resources; Passed the House on March 6, 2014 (229-179)

The Responsibly And Professionally Invigorating Development Act of 2013 (H.R. 2641) is a bill that would aim to expedite the review process required by the National Environmental Policy Act (NEPA) for construction projects that are partly or fully financed with federal funds or require permits or approvals from federal regulatory agencies. It was to do so by establishing specific deadlines for environmental reviews, which sometimes go on so long that they can delay a project for years.

The bill passed in the United States House of Representatives during the 113th United States Congress.

== Provisions of the bill ==
This summary is based largely on the summary provided by the Congressional Research Service, a public domain source.

The Responsibly And Professionally Invigorating Development Act of 2013 or the RAPID Act would state as the purpose of this Act to establish procedures to streamline, increase the efficiency of, and enhance coordination of agency administration of the regulatory review, environmental decision making, and permitting process for major actions that are construction activities undertaken, reviewed, or funded by federal agencies.

The bill would authorize a project sponsor, upon the request of a lead agency (the agency responsible preparing the environmental document), to prepare any document for environmental review required in support of, or for approval of, such an activity if such agency furnishes oversight and independently evaluates, approves, and adopts such document prior to taking action or making any approval based on such document. Defines "environmental review" as federal agency procedures for preparing an environmental impact statement (EIS), environmental assessment (EA), categorical exclusion, or other document under the National Environmental Policy Act of 1969 (NEPA).

The bill would prohibit requiring more than one EIS and one EA for a project, except for supplemental environmental documents prepared under NEPA or environmental documents prepared pursuant to a court order. Requires the lead agency to prepare the EIS or EA, except as otherwise provided by law. Prohibits, after the lead agency issues a record of decision, any federal agency responsible for making any approval for a project from relying on a document other than the environmental document prepared by the lead agency.

The bill would allow the lead agency, upon the request of a project sponsor, to: (1) adopt, use, or rely upon secondary and cumulative impact analyses included in documents prepared under NEPA for projects in the same geographic area if such documents are pertinent to the NEPA decision for the project under review; and (2) adopt a document that has been prepared for a project under state laws as the EIS or EA for the project if such laws provide environmental protection and opportunities for public involvement that are substantially equivalent to NEPA. Requires the lead agency to publish a supplement to the state document if: (1) a significant change has been made to the project that is relevant for purposes of environmental review, or (2) there have been significant changes in circumstances or availability of information relevant to such review. Requires a lead agency to issue its record of decision or finding of no significant impact based upon such adopted document.

The bill would authorize a lead agency to adopt for a project an environmental document for a similar project that is in geographical proximity and that was subject to environmental review or similar state procedures within the preceding five years if the agency determines that there is a reasonable likelihood that the projects will have similar environmental impacts.

The bill would require the lead agency to invite and designate as a participating agency in the preparation of an environmental document for a project any federal agency that is required to adopt such document. Requires such an agency to collaborate on the preparation of such document unless it informs the lead agency that it has no jurisdiction, authority, expertise, or information with respect to, and does not intend to submit comments on, the project. Precludes any agency that declines to participate from submitting comments on such document or taking measures to oppose any permit, license, or approval related to that project based on the environmental review. Prohibits the lead agency from acting upon, responding to, or including in any document prepared under NEPA any comment submitted by a participating agency that concerns matters outside of such agency's authority and expertise.

The bill would require federal agencies to carry out: (1) obligations under other applicable laws concurrently and in conjunction with the review required under NEPA; and (2) such rules, policies, and procedures as may be reasonably necessary to enable such agency to ensure the completion of the environmental review and environmental decision-making process in a timely, coordinated, and environmentally responsible manner.

The bill would set forth provisions concerning requirements for initiating and completing environmental review for a project, including requirements for: (1) determining the range of alternatives to be considered; (2) methodologies for analyzing such alternatives, including potential effects on employment; (3) a plan for coordinating public and agency participation in the review; (4) periods for public and agency comments on draft EISs; and (5) a schedule for completing the review. Requires all participating agencies to comply with such schedule.

The bill would establish: (1) for projects requiring preparation of an EA, a one-year deadline for issuing a finding of no significant impact or a Notice of Intent to Prepare an EIS; and (2) for projects requiring preparation of an EIS, a two-year deadline for completing the EIS. Sets forth conditions for extensions.

The bill would set forth deadlines for decisions required under any other federal law relating to the undertaking of a project being reviewed under NEPA. Deems: (1) a project to be approved in the event that a federal agency fails to approve or otherwise act upon a permit, license, or other similar application for approval related to a project within such deadlines, and (2) such approval to be final agency action that may not be reversed by an agency.

The bill would prescribe responsibilities of the lead agency and the participating agencies to work cooperatively to identify and resolve issues that could delay completion of the environmental review or could result in denial of any approvals required for the project under applicable laws.

The bill would require the head of each federal agency to report annually on: (1) the projects for which the agency initiated preparation of an EIS or EA; (2) the projects for which the agency issued a record of decision or a finding of no significant impact and the length of time it took the agency to complete the environmental review for each such project; and (3) the filing and resolution of any lawsuits against the agency seeking judicial review of a permit, license, or approval issued by the agency for an action subject to NEPA.

The bill would set forth limitations to claims arising under federal law seeking judicial review of a permit, license, or approval issued by a federal agency for an action subject to NEPA.

The bill would prohibit this Act from being construed to supersede, amend, or modify specified regulations concerning environmental review of transportation projects.

The bill would require the Council on Environmental Quality and each federal agency to amend NEPA implementing regulations to implement the provisions of this Act.

== Congressional Budget Office report ==
This summary is based largely on the summary provided by the Congressional Budget Office, as ordered reported by the House Committee on the Judiciary on July 31, 2013. This is a public domain source.

H.R. 2641 would amend the Administrative Procedures Act, the law that governs how federal agencies propose and establish regulations. Specifically, the bill would aim to expedite the review process required by the National Environmental Policy Act (NEPA) for construction projects that are partly or fully financed with federal funds or require permits or approvals from federal regulatory agencies.

The Congressional Budget Office (CBO) estimates that implementing this legislation would cost $5 million over the next five years, assuming the availability of appropriated funds, as federal agencies would incur additional administrative costs to meet the new requirements imposed by H.R. 2641. Additional federal expenditures also would occur if agencies face legal challenges as a result of the bill's implementation. Over time, we expect that the bill could reduce the time needed to commence and complete some construction projects financed with federal funds. Expediting the time required to start such projects would generally reduce the total costs to complete them, but CBO has no basis for estimating the timing or magnitude of such savings.

Enacting H.R. 2641 would not affect direct spending or revenues; therefore, pay-as-you-go procedures do not apply.

H.R. 2641 contains no intergovernmental or private-sector mandates as defined in the Unfunded Mandates Reform Act.

== Procedural history ==
The Responsibly And Professionally Invigorating Development Act of 2013 was introduced into the United States House of Representatives on July 10, 2013, by Rep. Tom Marino (R, PA-10). It was referred to the United States House Committee on the Judiciary and the United States House Committee on Natural Resources. On March 6, 2014, the House voted 229–179 to pass the bill.

President Barack Obama threatened to veto the bill.

== Debate and discussion ==
Arguing in favor of the bill, Republicans said that the bill does not require environmental reviews to approve projects, just that the reviews be done in a reasonable time frame. Rep. Bob Goodlatte (R-VA) said that the bill "sets hard deadlines, including an 18-month maximum deadline for an environmental assessment, and a 36-month maximum deadline for an environmental impact statement." Goodlatte argued that the bill would be good for the economy because it would speed up new construction projects.

The United States Chamber of Commerce strongly supported the bill, saying that "every year that major projects are stalled or cancelled because of a dysfunctional permitting process and a system that allows limitless challenges by opponents of development, millions of jobs are not created."

Arguing against the bill, some Democrats said that the deadlines would lead to "the possibility that projects will be approved too quickly, which could lead to legal and environmental problems, and more delays, down the road." Opponents, like Rep. Alcee Hastings (D-FL), also argued that environmental reviews were not the main cause of delays in new construction projects according to research from the Congressional Research Service.

== See also ==
- List of bills in the 113th United States Congress
- Environmental impact assessment
- Environmental impact statement
