= Tom Marino =

American politician & attorney (born 1952)

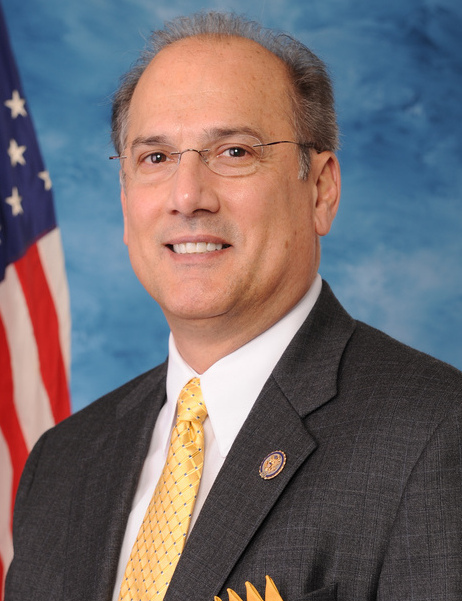

District Attorney of Lycoming County
- Incumbent
- Assumed office December 29, 2023
- Preceded by: Ryan Gardner
- In office 1992–2002
- Preceded by: Brett Feese
- Succeeded by: Michael Dinges

Member of the U.S. House of Representatives from Pennsylvania
- In office January 3, 2011 – January 23, 2019
- Preceded by: Chris Carney
- Succeeded by: Fred Keller
- Constituency: 10th district (2011–2019); 12th district (2019)

United States Attorney for the Middle District of Pennsylvania
- In office 2002 – October 12, 2007
- President: George W. Bush
- Preceded by: David Barasch
- Succeeded by: Martin Carlson

Personal details
- Born: Thomas Anthony Marino; August 13, 1952 (age 74) Williamsport, Pennsylvania, U.S.
- Party: Republican
- Spouse: Edie
- Children: 2 (adopted)
- Education: Pennsylvania College of Technology; Lycoming College (BA); Dickinson School of Law (JD)

Thomas Anthony Marino (born August 13, 1952) is an American politician and attorney, who served as a United States representative from Pennsylvania from 2011 to 2019. He represented the 10th congressional district from January 3, 2011 to January 3, 2019, and the 12th district from January 3 to January 23, 2019, when he resigned to work in the private sector. A member of the Republican Party, Marino was the U.S. attorney for the United States District Court for the Middle District of Pennsylvania in his early career.

On September 1, 2017, President Donald Trump nominated Marino to be Director of the Office of National Drug Control Policy, commonly known as the "drug czar". He withdrew on October 17, 2017, following reports that he had been the chief architect behind a bill that protected pharmaceutical manufacturers and distributors and crippled the DEA's ability to combat the U.S. opioid epidemic. Two weeks after being sworn in for his fifth term, Marino announced his resignation from Congress, effective January 23, 2019, to work in the private sector.

== Early life and education ==
Marino was born on August 13, 1952, and raised in Lycoming County, Pennsylvania. After graduating from high school, Marino went to work in the factories of central Pennsylvania. At age 30, Marino enrolled in the former Williamsport Area Community College (now Pennsylvania College of Technology). Marino would then transfer to Lycoming College, where he graduated magna cum laude, before completing his J.D. degree at Dickinson School of Law.

== Law career ==
After beginning his legal career in private practice, Marino served as a Lycoming County District Attorney from 1992 to 2002. In 2002, Marino was appointed the United States Attorney for the United States District Court for the Middle District of Pennsylvania by President George W. Bush. During his tenure as U.S. Attorney, Marino led the prosecution of executives of Rite Aid for criminal fraud. The company's former president pleaded guilty to conspiring to inflate income by $1.6 billion and conspiring to obstruct justice.

On October 12, 2007, Marino resigned from his role as U.S. Attorney for the Middle District of Pennsylvania. In 2007, the new U.S. Attorney for the Middle District of Pennsylvania, Peter Smith, confirmed that neither Marino, nor his office, were ever under review or investigation.

== U.S. House of Representatives ==
=== District ===
Pennsylvania's 10th congressional district, located in central and northeastern Pennsylvania, includes Bradford County, Juniata County, Lycoming County, Mifflin County, Pike County, Snyder County, Sullivan County, Susquehanna County, Union County, Wayne County, and portions of Perry County, Tioga County, Lackawanna County, Monroe County, and Northumberland County.

=== Elections ===
2010

In 2010, Marino decided to challenge incumbent Democratic U.S. Congressman Chris Carney of Pennsylvania's 10th congressional district. He won the three-candidate Republican primary with 41% of the vote, defeating Dave Madeira (31%) and Snyder County Commissioner Malcolm Derk (28%). On November 2, 2010, Marino defeated Carney 55-45%.

2010 Pennsylvania's 10th congressional district elections
Party	Candidate	Votes	%	±%
Republican	Tom Marino	109,603	55	
Democratic	Chris Carney (incumbent)	89,170	45	

2012

In 2012, Marino won re-election to a second term, defeating Democratic nominee Philip Scollo 66%–34%.

2012 Pennsylvania's 10th congressional district elections
Party	Candidate	Votes	%	±%
Republican	Tom Marino (incumbent)	179,563	65.6	
Democratic	Phil Scollo	94,227	34.4	

2014

In 2014, Marino faced off against Independent Nick Troiano and Democrat Scott Brion. Marino garnered 62% of the vote with Troiano received 13% and Brion received 25%.

2014 Pennsylvania's 10th congressional district elections
Party	Candidate	Votes	%	±%
Republican	Tom Marino (incumbent)	112,851	62.6	
Democratic	Scott Brion	44,737	24.8	
	Nick Troiano	22,734	12.6	

=== Tenure ===
Marino ranked third among Pennsylvania's congressional delegation in Americans for Prosperity's 2012 scorecard (70%) and fifth in the Club for Growth's 2012 scorecard (63%).

=== Committees ===
- Committee on the Judiciary
  - Chairman of the Subcommittee on Regulatory Reform, Commercial and Antitrust Law
  - Subcommittee on Courts, Intellectual Property and the Internet
- Committee on Foreign Affairs
  - Subcommittee on Asia and the Pacific
  - Subcommittee on Europe and Eurasia
- Committee on Homeland Security
  - Subcommittee on Cybersecurity, Infrastructure Protection, and Security Technologies
  - Subcommittee on Emergency Preparedness, Response, and Communications (Vice Chair)

Marino was a member of the House Baltic Caucus.

=== Resignation ===
After a court-ordered redistricting, Marino's district was renumbered as the 12th District ahead of the 2018 elections. It lost its suburban territory closer to Scranton and Wilkes-Barre, in the process losing its last connection to longtime congressman Joseph McDade, who represented the district from 1961 to 1999. To make up for the loss in population, it was pushed slightly westward to take in State College, home to Penn State.

The new district was no less Republican than its predecessor, and Marino easily won a fifth term, defeating Democrat Marc Friedenberg with 66 percent of the vote. On January 17, 2019, two weeks after being sworn in for a new term, Marino announced his resignation from the House, to be effective January 23, 2019. Marino described his decision to resign as follows: "Having spent over two decades serving the public, I have chosen to take a position in the private sector where I can use both my legal and business experience to create jobs around the nation." Marino's resignation required a special election to be called by Pennsylvania Governor Tom Wolf via a writ of election within 10 days of Marino's resignation becoming effective on January 23, 2019. Per Pennsylvania law, the special election had to occur no fewer than 60 days following the gubernatorial proclamation being made. On May 21, 2019, Republican state representative Fred Keller won the special election with 68.1% of the vote, defeating Marino's 2018 Democratic opponent Marc Friedenberg, and succeeded Marino in Congress.

== Political positions ==
Marino supported the death penalty. He believed that the mentally ill and criminals should not be able to obtain guns.

In July 2013, Marino voted against Justin Amash's amendment #413 to H.R. 2397 "To end authority for the blanket collection of records under the Patriot Act and bar the NSA and other agencies from using Section 215 of the Patriot Act to collect records, including telephone call records, that pertain to persons who are not subject to an investigation under Section 215."

In 2011, Marino became a co-sponsor of Bill H.R.3261, also known as the Stop Online Piracy Act.

A former supporter of President Donald Trump, who was co-chair of Trump's 2016 presidential campaign in Pennsylvania, Marino broke with Trump in 2022. This came after Trump's decision not to endorse former Congressman Lou Barletta in the Republican primary election for Governor of Pennsylvania. In not endorsing Barletta, who co-chaired alongside him, Marino accused Trump of throwing Barletta "under the bus." Marino also said he would thus not support any candidate who had Trump's endorsement.

=== Pharmaceuticals ===
In October 2017, The Washington Post and 60 Minutes reported that Marino was the chief advocate of a 2016 bill that hobbled the ability of the Drug Enforcement Administration to combat the opioid epidemic. Marino introduced the bill, the Ensuring Patient Access and Effective Drug Enforcement Act, in 2014 and again in 2015; it failed both times. The 2014 version was opposed by the DEA and the Justice Department, but the 2015 version was sold as an attempt to "work with the pharmaceutical companies" and was subject to heavy lobbying. A similar version introduced in the Senate by Orrin Hatch passed both houses of Congress by unanimous consent and was signed into law by President Barack Obama on April 19, 2016. The legislation aimed to weaken the DEA's authority to take enforcement action against drug distributors who supplied unscrupulous physician and pharmacists with opioids for diversion to the black market. Previously, the DEA had fined individuals who profited on suspicious sales of painkillers and repeatedly ignored warnings that the painkillers were sold illegally. The new legislation would have made it "virtually impossible" for the DEA to stop these sales, according to internal agency documents, Justice Department documents, and the DEA Chief Administrative Law Judge John J. Mulrooney II. Marino, whose district was heavily affected by the opioid epidemic, declined to comment on the reports. The drug industry spent at least $102 million lobbying Congress on the legislation between 2014 and 2016. McKesson Corporation, AmerisourceBergen, and Cardinal Health spent $13 million lobbying in support of the bill. When Joseph Rannazzisi, the chief of the Drug Enforcement Administration (DEA)'s Office of Diversion Control, strongly criticized the bill, Marino and his cosponsor Marsha Blackburn demanded that the drug diversion enforcer be investigated by the United States Department of Justice Office of the Inspector General. Nothing came of the investigation but Rannazzisi was removed from his position in August and retired in October 2015. According to The New York Times, Blackburn's best known legislation was that bill which revised the legal standard that the Drug Enforcement Administration (DEA) had used to establish that "a significant and present risk of death or serious bodily harm that is more likely than not to occur," rather than the previous tougher standard of "imminent danger," before suspending the manufacturer's opioid drug shipments. The legislation was criticized in internal Justice Department documents, and by the DEA's chief administrative law judge, as hampering DEA enforcement actions against drug distribution companies engaging in black-market sales. Rannazzisi said he informed Blackburn's staffers precisely what the effects would be as a result of the passage of a 2016 law the two sponsored, as national awareness grew regarding a crisis in the prescriptions of opioids in the United States. Blackburn admitted her bill had what she characterized as unforeseen “unintended consequences,” but Rannazzisi said they should have been anticipated. He said that during a July 2014 conference call he informed congressional staffers the bill would cause more difficulties for the DEA if it pursued corporations which were illegally distributing such drugs.

== Post-Congressional career ==
=== Office of National Drug Control Policy ===
In September 2017, President Donald Trump nominated Marino to serve as the Director of the Office of National Drug Control Policy ("drug czar"). In October, Senator Joe Manchin (D-WV) called on Trump to withdraw Marino's nomination. Trump said he would "look into" reports about Marino, putting his nomination in question. On October 17, 2017, Marino withdrew his nomination.

=== Lycoming County D.A. ===
In 2023, Marino announced he would run for District Attorney of Lycoming County, Pennsylvania, which he held once before. Despite earlier rumors, Marino said he would not run against incumbent Republican D.A. Ryan C. Gardner. However, Gardner later announced his decision to not run for re-election, instead running for a judge seat. Gardner's decision thus left the D.A. position open for Marino to run. Until his candidacy announcement, Marino and his wife lived in Florida. He then moved back to Lycoming County. Because of his recent residency in Florida, two challenges were made to invalidate his candidacy. One challenge was dismissed by a judge, appealed to the Commonwealth Court of Pennsylvania, and dismissed again. The other was sent for review by the Pennsylvania Attorney General. Marino ran unopposed in the Republican primary, and received the most votes as a write-in in the Democratic primary. Because he was nominee for both parties, Marino won the general election uncontested. Upon his victory, Marino said his priorities as D.A. would be prosecuting fentanyl dealers and child molesters. He was sworn-in on December 29.

== Personal life ==
Marino and his wife Edie currently live in Loyalsock Township, Pennsylvania.

In February 2019, Marino said health issues led to his January resignation from Congress. Multiple battles with kidney cancer have left Marino with only part of one kidney, and after another kidney problem required surgery, he made his decision to resign.

Marino is Roman Catholic.

Legal offices
Preceded by David Barasch	United States Attorney for the Middle District of Pennsylvania; 2002–2007	Succeeded by Martin Carlson
U.S. House of Representatives
Preceded by Chris Carney	Member of the U.S. House of Representatives from Pennsylvania's 10th congressional district 2011–2019	Succeeded by Scott Perry
Preceded by Keith Rothfus	Member of the U.S. House of Representatives from Pennsylvania's 12th congressional district 2019	Succeeded by Fred Keller
U.S. order of precedence (ceremonial)
Preceded by Lou Barletta as Former U.S. Representative	Order of precedence of the United States as Former U.S. Representative	Succeeded by Mike Ferguson as Former U.S. Representative
