= Cynthia Ore =

American mistress of Don Sherwood

Cynthia Mirella Ore (born 1970s) is a Maryland woman who gained brief notoriety in the second half of 2005 and during the 2006 midterm election, as a result of her widely publicized extramarital affair with Pennsylvania's 10th congressional district Representative Don Sherwood. She subsequently accused Sherwood of abusing her during their relationship.

In court documents and press interviews, Ore said she met Congressman Sherwood at a Young Republicans meeting in September 1999. Ore was 23 years old and Sherwood was 58 when they began a "close romantic and intimate personal relationship", according to a 2005 filing by Ore's attorney. Their five-year extramarital affair ended after Ore described several instances of physical abuse by the congressman.

On the afternoon of September 15, 2004, Ore locked herself inside the bathroom of Sherwood's Washington, D.C. apartment. She used her cell phone to make an emergency call to police. When authorities arrived, Ore reported that she had been choked by Sherwood. The congressman told police he was only giving her a backrub. Initially, no charges were filed. Their relationship soon ended—though Ore has stated that Sherwood remained in contact with her.

Sherwood initially denied the affair, stating that Ore was merely a "casual acquaintance". After a police report was leaked to the press in 2005, Sherwood publicly admitted his lengthy affair with Ore, but denied her reports of abuse. Ore filed a $5.5 million lawsuit against Sherwood in June 2005. The suit was settled out of court on November 8, 2005, but the terms of the monetary settlement have never been made public.

In an interview with a Wilkes-Barre newspaper, Ore said she was born to a wealthy family and grew up in Peru. Various news stories in 2005 and 2006 gave her age as 29 and mentioned in passing that, in 2001, she had been an intern for U.S. Representative Bill Shuster, another Pennsylvania Republican, but left after two days. Newspapers also reported that she was said to be taking business classes at Johns Hopkins University and, in 2006, had changed her name.
