= Chris Carney =

American politician (born 1959)

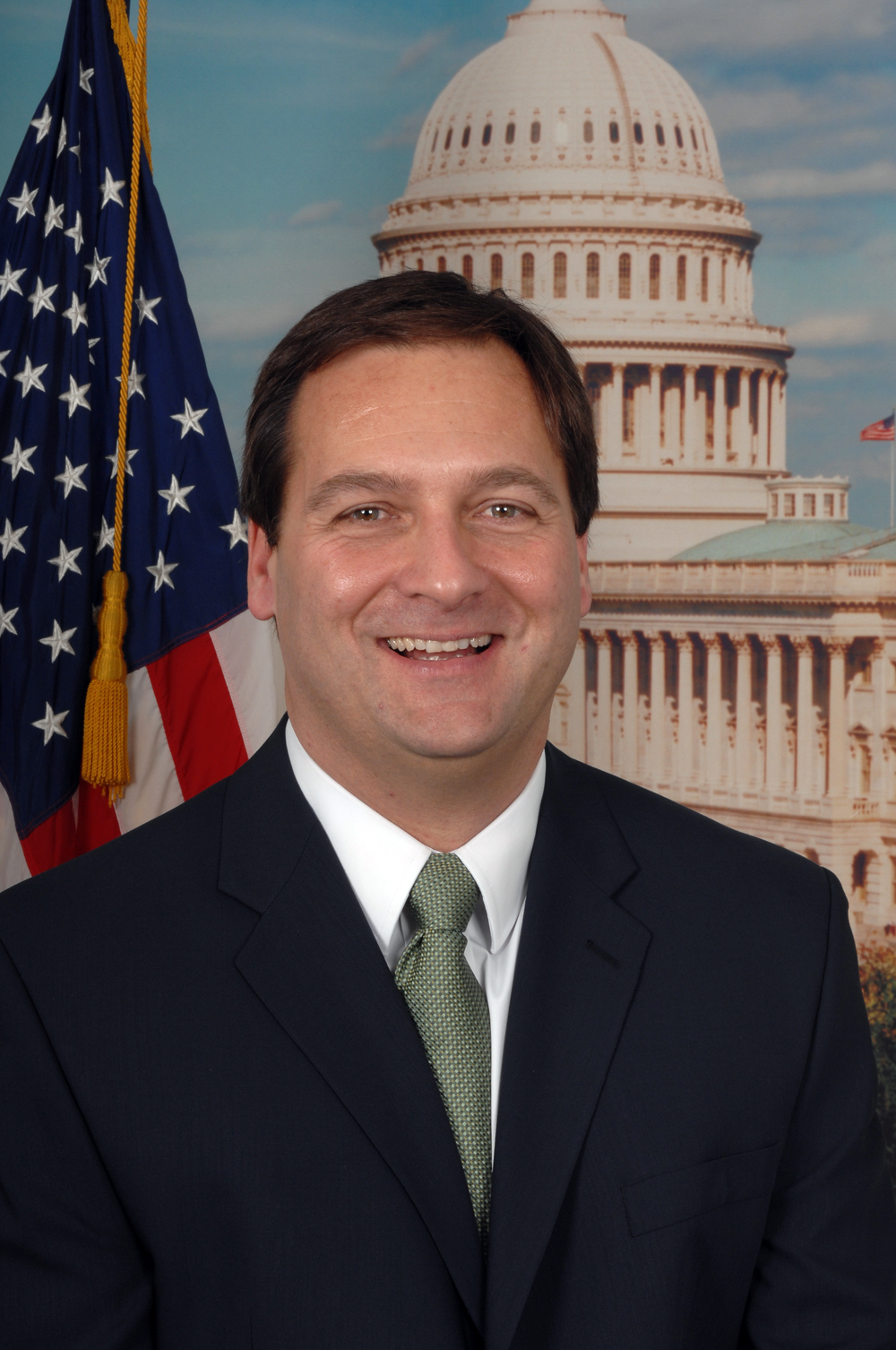

Member of the U.S. House of Representatives from Pennsylvania's 10th district
- In office January 3, 2007 – January 3, 2011
- Preceded by: Don Sherwood
- Succeeded by: Tom Marino

Personal details
- Born: Christopher Paul Carney; March 2, 1959 (age 67) Cedar Rapids, Iowa, U.S.
- Party: Democratic
- Spouse: Jennifer Carney
- Education: Cornell College (BA); University of Wyoming (MA); University of Nebraska–Lincoln (PhD)

Military service
- Branch/service: United States Navy
- Rank: Commander
- Unit: Noble Eagle; Defense Intelligence Agency; The Pentagon (advisor)
- Battles/wars: Operation Enduring Freedom
- Awards: Defense Meritorious Service Medal; Navy and Marine Corps Achievement Medal; Joint Service Achievement Medal (3); Military Outstanding Volunteer Service Medal; Naval Rifle Marksman Ribbon; Naval Pistol Expert Medal

Christopher Paul Carney (born March 2, 1959) is an American politician who was the U.S. representative for Pennsylvania's 10th congressional district from 2007 to 2011. He is a member of the Democratic Party. He is an associate professor of political science at Penn State Worthington Scranton, where he has taught since 1992.

== Early life, education, and career ==
Carney grew up in Coggon, Iowa, and earned his bachelor's degree from Cornell College in Mount Vernon, Iowa, received his master's from the University of Wyoming, and completed his Ph.D. in political science at the University of Nebraska–Lincoln. He has been an associate professor of political science at Penn State Worthington Scranton since 1992.

From 2002 to 2004, Carney served as a counterterrorism analyst for the Bush administration, under Douglas Feith in the Office of Special Plans and at the Defense Intelligence Agency, researching links between al Qaeda and Saddam Hussein.

From 2013 to 2016, Carney was a commissioner for the Military Compensation and Retirement Modernization Commission (MCRMC). He was selected by President Obama to serve as one of nine commissioners on this panel.

Carney worked as a senior intelligence specialist for the National Aviation Intelligence Integration Office (within the purview of the director of National Intelligence) from 2016 to 2017.

In 2019, Carney joined Nossaman LLP's Washington, D.C. office, where he serves as a senior policy advisor.

== Military service ==
A commander in the United States Naval Reserve, Carney served multiple tours overseas and was activated for operations Enduring Freedom and Noble Eagle. He was direct commissioned as an ensign in 1995. He served as senior terrorism and intelligence advisor at the Pentagon.

He is the recipient of the Defense Meritorious Service Medal, three Joint Service Achievement Medals, the Navy and Marine Corps Achievement Medal, and the Outstanding Volunteer Service Medal. His awards also include the Naval Rifle Marksman ribbon and the Naval Pistol Expert Medal.

In September 2007, Congressman Carney went on active duty with the Navy for his two weeks of service as a Lt. Commander in the reserve. On active duty, Carney worked on the "Predator" project near Norfolk, VA.

In July 2008, Carney was promoted from lieutenant commander to commander in the Naval Reserve. He was one of just two members of the House to serve in the military reserve.

During his unsuccessful 2010 re-election campaign, Carney revealed that he had served as an interrogator at Guantanamo. Carol Rosenberg, writing in the Miami Herald, wrote that although Carney had traveled with fellow Congressional Representatives on fact-finding trips to Guantanamo, he had never informed them that he himself had served there.

== U.S. House of Representatives ==
=== Committee assignments ===
- Committee on Homeland Security
  - Subcommittee on Management, Investigations, and Oversight (chair)
- Committee on Transportation and Infrastructure
  - Subcommittee on Highways and Transit
  - Subcommittee on Economic Development, Public Buildings and Emergency Management

In January 2007, Carney was named chairman of the Homeland Security Subcommittee on Management, Investigations, and Oversight, a surprising achievement for a freshman congressman.

== Political positions ==
=== Social Security ===
While opposing proposals to privatize Social Security, he said he is open to the idea of adding private accounts in addition to (not at the expense of) traditional defined benefits.

=== Research ===
Carney supports federal investment in stem cell research, and is an advocate of universal healthcare.

=== Gun rights ===
He supports gun rights.

=== Education ===
In 2009, Carney voted for H.R 2187, the 21st Century Green Schools Act, to make grants to states for the modernization, renovation, or repair of public schools, including early learning facilities and charter schools, to make them safe, healthy, high-performing, and technologically up-to-date.

=== War in Iraq ===
Carney made change of direction in Iraq policy a cornerstone of his 2006 campaign, often decrying the Bush Administration's war policies. He voted to reauthorize funding for military action in Iraq with H.R. 2206. In 2007, he voted against H.R. 2956, which would have required the removal of all US personnel from Iraq within only 120 days. He stated that since the US was already at war in Iraq, the top priority should be winning the war.

=== 2008 financial crisis ===
Carney voted against the Emergency Economic Stabilization Act of 2008 and voted for the American Recovery and Reinvestment Act of 2009.

=== Healthcare ===
Carney voted for the Affordable Health Care for America Act as well as the Patient Protection and Affordable Care Act.

== Political campaigns ==
=== 2006 ===
When Carney entered the race for the 10th, he was initially considered an underdog against Republican incumbent Don Sherwood. The 10th had been in Republican hands since 1961. The four-term incumbent had barely defeated Democrat Patrick Casey in his bid to succeed popular 36-year incumbent Joseph McDade in 1998, and narrowly defeated Casey in a 2000 rematch. In hopes of protecting Sherwood, the Republican-controlled state legislature made the 10th significantly more rural and Republican after the 2000 census, and the Democrats hadn't even put up a candidate in the last two elections. However, revelations of Sherwood's five-year-long extramarital affair with a woman more than 30 years his junior, along with allegations of abuse, severely hampered Sherwood's reelection chances in the 10th, which has a strong social conservative tint. Carney also garnered the endorsement of 30 labor unions.

During the campaign, Carney raised money with a wide variety of supporters, including Sen. Barack Obama, Sen Joe Biden, Rep. Jay Inslee, Rep. Jack Murtha, and one-time Republican Richard Perle, former chairman of the Defense Policy Board Advisory Committee Douglas Feith, former Under Secretary of Defense for Policy, congratulated Carney on Election Night.

=== 2008 ===
Carney faced Republican staffing executive Chris Hackett in his bid for a second term. On paper, Carney was one of the few incumbent Democrats to be rated vulnerable in this election cycle, because he was a freshman running in a strongly Republican district (its Cook Partisan Voting Index was R+8). The National Republican Congressional Committee advertised for Hackett, while the Service Employees International Union and Democratic Congressional Campaign Committee—which were among those organizations identifying Carney as especially vulnerable—advertised on his behalf, placing special emphasis on his vote for an increase in the federal minimum wage to $7.25 by 2009, a measure passed by both houses of Congress and signed into law by Bush on May 24, 2007.

Since the summer of 2007, the nonpartisan Cook Political Report and a number of other political analysts listed Carney's District as "slightly" leaning Democratic in 2008, and according to the FEC Carney has raised over $500,000 towards his re-election in the first six months of 2007. Public opinion polls conducted in January 2008 indicated a lead over Hackett (then a candidate in the GOP primary), by significant double-digit margins and even a majority of registered Republicans, 53 percent, approve of Carney's job performance. The candidates differed over Social Security. Carney opposed Bush's plan for privatization, while Hackett supported it.

Chris Carney was a superdelegate to the 2008 Democratic National Convention. He vowed that he would "wait and see how his district votes", hinting that he would likely issue an endorsement after the April 22 Pennsylvania primary for the candidate that wins by a "landslide"—if a huge victory by either occurs—in his overwhelmingly conservative district in which registered Democrats are few compared to Republicans. Another northeastern Pennsylvania Congressman, Paul Kanjorski, had long endorsed and actively campaigned for Clinton, alongside a number of other Democratic politicians in the state, including Governor Ed Rendell, while U.S. senator Bob Casey, Jr. was Obama's most significant supporter. Carney endorsed Clinton on May 9 after she carried his district in the Democratic primary by a whopping 70%-30% margin. On November 4, 2008, Carney defeated Republican Chris Hackett 56% to 44%.

=== 2010 ===
Carney was challenged by Republican nominee and former U. S. Attorney Tom Marino. In the 2010 election, Marino defeated Carney, 55–45%. Proving just how Republican this district still was, the Democrats have not crossed the 40 percent mark in the district, since renumbered as the 12th District, since Carney left office. Carney is the only Democrat to cross the 40 percent mark since Scranton was drawn out of the district after the 2000 census.

=== Boards ===
In 2011, he was appointed as director of homeland security and policy strategy for BAE Systems.

Carney is a board member for the American Edge Project, an advocacy organization for the technology industry.

== Electoral history ==
General Election 2006: Pennsylvania's 10th congressional district
Party	Candidate	Votes	%
Democratic	Chris Carney	110,115	52.9
Republican	Don Sherwood	97,862	47.1

General Election 2008: Pennsylvania's 10th congressional district
Party	Candidate	Votes	%
Democratic	Christopher Carney (incumbent)	160,837	56.33
Republican	Chris Hackett	124,681	43.67

General Election 2010: Pennsylvania's 10th congressional district
Party	Candidate	Votes	%
Republican	Tom Marino	110,599	55.2
Democratic	Chris Carney	89,846	44.8
Total votes		200,445	100

U.S. House of Representatives
Preceded by Don Sherwood	Member of the U.S. House of Representatives from Pennsylvania's 10th congressional district 2007–2011	Succeeded by Tom Marino
U.S. order of precedence (ceremonial)
Preceded by Charles F. Dougherty as Former U.S. Representative	Order of precedence of the United States as Former U.S. Representative	Succeeded by Patrick Murphy as Former U.S. Representative
