= Don Sherwood (politician) =

American politician (born 1941)

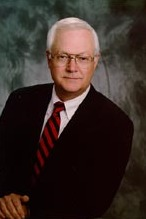

Member of the U.S. House of Representatives from Pennsylvania's 10th district
- In office January 3, 1999 – January 3, 2007
- Preceded by: Joseph McDade
- Succeeded by: Chris Carney

Personal details
- Born: Donald Lewis Sherwood; March 5, 1941 (age 85) Nicholson, Pennsylvania, U.S.
- Party: Republican
- Spouse: Carol Evans
- Education: Dartmouth College (BA)

Donald Lewis Sherwood (born March 5, 1941) is an American politician. He served as a Republican member of the United States House of Representatives, representing Pennsylvania's 10th congressional district, from 1999 to 2007. He was defeated for reelection by Democrat Chris Carney in November 2006.

== Biography ==
=== Personal life ===
Born in Nicholson, Pennsylvania, Sherwood attended Lackawanna Trail High School and graduated from Dartmouth College in 1963, and spent the next two years in the U.S. Army. He opened a Chevrolet-Pontiac dealership in Tunkhannock and became well known in northeastern Pennsylvania through his ads in the area. He was also one of the original owner principals of Tunkhannock radio station WEMR, which first went on the air in 1986. Though he has since sold the radio station, the car dealership is still owned by his family. He is married and has three daughters.

Sherwood began his political career in 1975, when he was elected to the Tunkhannock Area School Board. He served on this panel for 23 years, the last six as board president.

=== Congressional career ===
In 1998, Sherwood won the Republican nomination to replace 10th District Congressman Joseph McDade, who was retiring after serving 36 years in Congress. He barely won the general election that year, edging out Democrat Patrick Casey, son of former Pennsylvania governor Robert Casey, by 515 votes. Some believe McDade's 11th-hour endorsement of Sherwood made the difference, even though Sherwood is considerably more conservative than McDade. He almost certainly got an additional boost from Governor Tom Ridge's landslide reelection victory. Sherwood narrowly defeated Casey again in 2000, most likely helped by George W. Bush narrowly winning the district.

For the better part of half a century, the 10th had been a relatively compact district covering the northeastern corner of the state, stretching just far enough to the south to grab Scranton, by far its largest city. The 10th had long been considered a swing district, though Republicans had held the seat since 1961. Redistricting by the Pennsylvania legislature after the 2000 census made Sherwood's district more Republican. Heavily Democratic Scranton, home to some 60 percent of the district's population, was shifted to the Wilkes-Barre based 11th, already a Democratic stronghold. In its place, the legislature added some more rural territory that had previously been in the heavily Republican 5th District. Sherwood successfully ran for re-election from this new district against third-party candidate Kurt Shotko in 2002 and 2004, in both cases winning with over 80 percent of the vote.

In 2002, he was named to the PoliticsPA list of Best Dressed Legislators.

=== Extramarital affair and report of abuse ===
On September 15, 2004, a woman locked herself inside the bathroom of Sherwood's Washington, D.C. apartment, and called 911 to report she was assaulted. When police arrived, the woman, Cynthia Ore, accused Sherwood of choking her, though he maintained he was only giving her a backrub. No charges were filed because both Sherwood and Ore refused to provide any details. The report of the Washington Metropolitan Police Department stated, "Both parties have left out significant information or are not willing to discuss in detail what actually happened."

The details of that incident went unnoticed until 2005, when Veronica Hannevig, who ran against Sherwood on the right wing Constitution Party ticket in 2004, distributed a copy of the police report to several newspapers and television stations. Sherwood initially contended that Ore was merely a "casual acquaintance". He eventually admitted he had a five-year extramarital affair with Ore, but denied abusing her.

Ore later filed a $5.5 million lawsuit against Sherwood, accusing him of repeatedly assaulting her during their relationship. On November 8, 2005, Sherwood and Ore ended the lawsuit by reaching a settlement, the terms of which were not released.

On November 3, 2006, the Associated Press reported that a source had revealed the terms of Sherwood's settlement with Ore. The story reports that Sherwood agreed to pay her about $500,000 but a confidentiality clause requires Ore to forfeit some of the money if she talks publicly about the case. It also reported that Ore had, as of November 3, received only about half of the money and that she would receive the other half after the November 7 election, giving Ore "a powerful incentive for her to keep quiet until after Election Day."

The Ore incident damaged Sherwood's standing with some Republicans. In April 2006, Martha Rainville, a Republican running for the U.S. House seat in Vermont, announced that she would return a campaign contribution from Sherwood's political action committee. She cited her belief in "strong family values". But Sherwood received strong support from Republican leaders for the 2006 Republican primary in his district (see below).

=== 2006 re-election campaign ===
==== Primary ====
In the Republican primary on May 15, 2006, Sherwood was held to 56 percent of the vote against political newcomer Kathy Scott. Sherwood received 56% of the vote. CQPolitics reported that his "mediocre showing" could be attributed to the admitted affair. Scott did not file a report with the FEC, which indicates that she spent less than $5,000 in her campaign.

Prior to the primary, Pennsylvania Senator Rick Santorum endorsed Sherwood and recorded an automated telephone call on Sherwood's behalf, as did President George W. Bush. Sherwood also received campaign contributions from several political action committees of other Republican members of the House.

==== General election ====
In the general election in November, Sherwood lost to Democrat Chris Carney, a former Defense Department consultant and navy lieutenant commander.

Carney criticized Sherwood's record on the issues, but also ran what the Associated Press described as "a hard-hitting commercial focusing on the [extramarital] affair". The ad quoted a voter saying, "This incident with Don Sherwood just cuts right at the core values of our district." The background displayed the text "repeatedly choking" and "attempting to strangle plaintiff", taken from the lawsuit filed by Ore against Sherwood.

Sherwood countered with a television ad in which he apologized for his affair with Ore, but denied ever abusing her. Addressing viewers, Sherwood said, "While I'm truly sorry for disappointing you, I never wavered from my commitment to reduce taxes, create jobs and bring home our fair share." He added, "Should you forgive me, you can count on me to keep on fighting hard for you and your family."

Carney defeated Sherwood in the election, 53% to 47%.

== See also ==
- Notable/competitive House races in Pennsylvania, 2006
- List of federal political sex scandals in the United States

U.S. House of Representatives
Preceded by Joseph McDade	Member of the U.S. House of Representatives from Pennsylvania's 10th congressional district 1999–2007	Succeeded by Chris Carney
U.S. order of precedence (ceremonial)
Preceded by Ron Klink as Former U.S. Representative	Order of precedence of the United States as Former U.S. Representative	Succeeded by Lou Barletta as Former U.S. Representative
