= Joseph McDade =

American politician

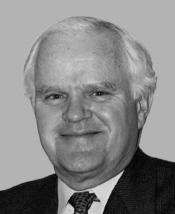

Member of the U.S. House of Representatives from Pennsylvania's 10th district
- In office January 3, 1963 – January 3, 1999
- Preceded by: William Scranton
- Succeeded by: Don Sherwood

Personal details
- Born: September 29, 1931 Scranton, Pennsylvania, U.S.
- Died: September 24, 2017 (aged 85) Fairfax, Virginia, U.S.
- Party: Republican
- Spouse(s): Mary Theresa O'Brien (m. 1962; div. 1987) Sarah Scripture
- Children: 5
- Education: University of Notre Dame; University of Pennsylvania
- Profession: lawyer, judge
- McDade's voice McDade speaks on agreed appropriations for the aftermath of Operation Desert Storm; Recorded March 22, 1991

Joseph Michael McDade (September 29, 1931 – September 24, 2017) was an American politician who was a member of the United States House of Representatives, having represented Pennsylvania's 10th congressional district.

== Early life and career ==
McDade was born in Scranton, Pennsylvania. He graduated from the University of Notre Dame in 1953, and earned his LL.B. from the University of Pennsylvania. McDade served a clerkship in the office of John W. Murphy, chief federal judge for the Middle District of Pennsylvania. He opened his own law practice in 1957. McDade was elected Scranton City Solicitor in 1962.

However, just after taking office as city solicitor, he was elected to Congress as a Republican. He barely held onto his seat in 1964 amid Lyndon B. Johnson's gigantic landslide that year, winning by just over 2,800 votes over James Haggerty. However, he would never face another contest nearly that close, and even ran unopposed in 1990.

In 1966, along with seven other Republican members of Congress, McDade signed a telegram sent to Georgia Governor Carl E. Sanders regarding the Georgia General Assembly's refusal to seat the recently elected Julian Bond in their state House of Representatives. This refusal, said the telegram, was "a dangerous attack on representative government. None of us agree with Mr. Bond's views on the Vietnam War; in fact we strongly repudiate these views. But unless otherwise determined by a court of law, which the Georgia Legislature is not, he is entitled to express them."

McDade was a longtime member of the House Appropriations Committee. After the Republicans gained control of the House in 1994, he served as vice-chairman of the full committee, chairman of the Subcommittee on Energy and Water Development and vice chairman of the Appropriations Subcommittee on National Security.

Unlike most Republicans, McDade had strong ties to organized labor. This served him well, since 60% of the 10th's vote was cast in the heavily Democratic and thoroughly unionized city of Scranton.

McDade was conservative on social issues. He was a member of the National Rifle Association and cosponsored several bills attempting to ban abortion and flag burning. He was also a strong supporter of tax and welfare reform, but also was an opponent of free trade agreements.

Ideologically, McDade was a moderate-to-liberal Republican.

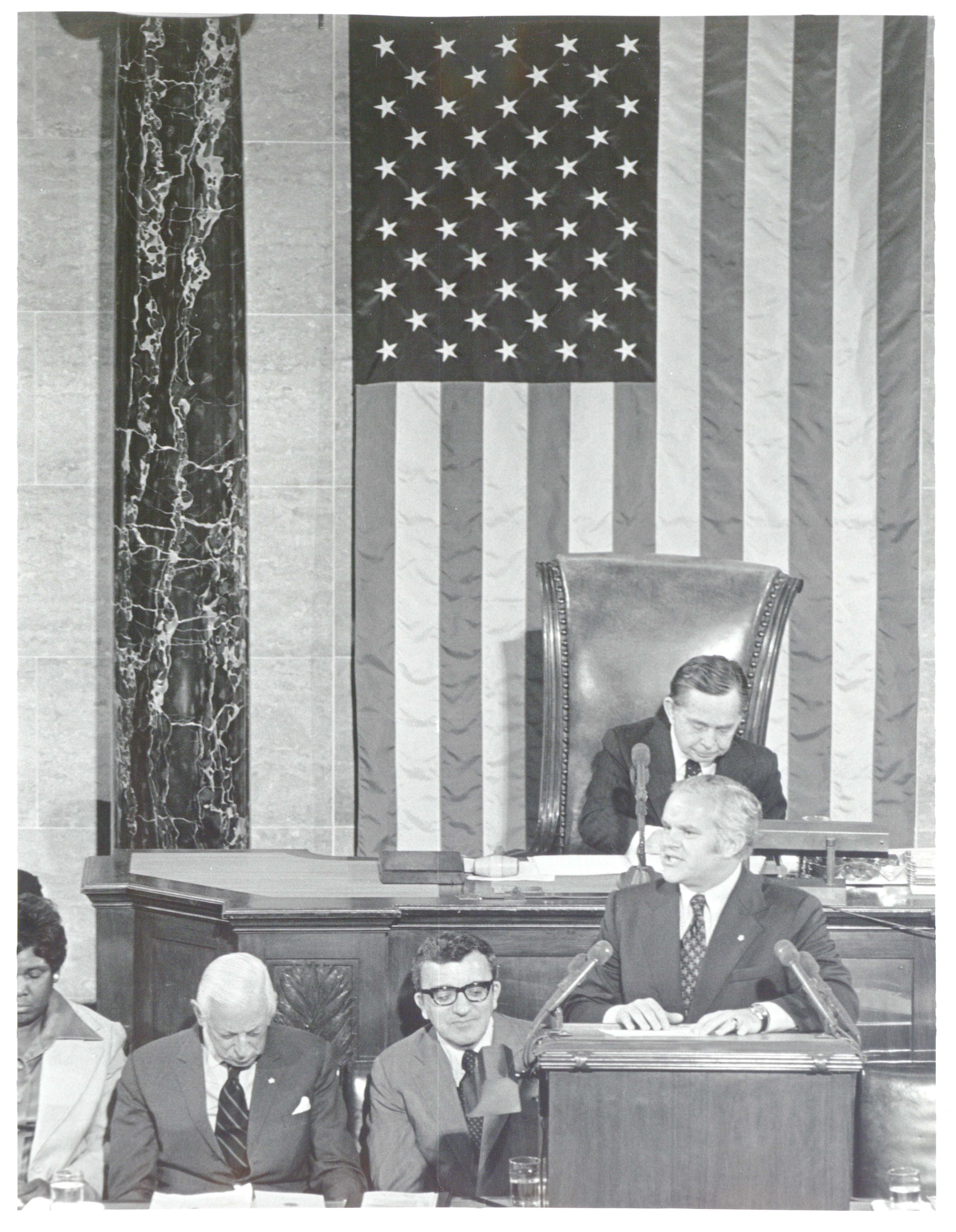
Joseph M. McDade speaking at the anniversary of the First Continental Congress. September 25, 1974. Behind is Speaker Carl Albert, to the left is Mike McCormack.

Regionally, McDade was the principal advocate for the Tobyhanna Army Depot and was instrumental in establishing the Delaware Water Gap National Recreation Area, the Steamtown National Historic Site, and the National Fishery Laboratory in Wellsboro. The government acquisition of Steamtown, U.S.A. and spending on the National Historic Site was criticized as pork barrel spending.

McDade retired from the House in 1999. He suffered from Parkinson's disease.

=== Indictment and acquittal ===
In 1992, McDade was indicted on bribery charges. He was charged with racketeering and conspiracy after allegedly accepting gifts and trips in exchange for allegedly diverting government contracts to specific groups. He was acquitted after a jury trial in 1996. Nevertheless, the indictment resulted in him being passed over for the chairmanship of the Appropriations Committee in 1995, even though he was the committee's most senior member. The chairmanship instead went to Bob Livingston of Louisiana, who was first elected to the House in 1977.

=== McDade Amendment ===
Following his acquittal, McDade introduced legislation that would require federal prosecutors to follow state legal ethics rules. The bill, known as the McDade Amendment, was passed as a rider to the Omnibus Consolidated and Emergency Appropriations Act, 1999 in October 1998, over the objection of Senator Orrin Hatch. The law was codified as section 530B of Title 28 of the United States Code.

== Indecent Exposure Charges ==
On January 18, 2007, several years after leaving Congress, McDade was accused by at least three women of "masturbating on the beach and by the pool area of the hotel" at a Florida beach resort in Sanibel, Florida. McDade was charged with first degree misdemeanor of indecent exposure. In July 2008, he was ruled incompetent to stand trial for these charges.

== Death ==
McDade died on September 24, 2017, in Fairfax, Virginia, five days before his 86th birthday.

== Places named for McDade ==
- McDade Park – The Lackawanna Valley was scarred by coal mine surface "strippings", and one such surface mine was the Old Continental in the Keyser Valley. Congressman McDade secured funding and support to reclaim the Old Continental strip mine and convert it to a recreational park. The park has served as an environmental laboratory to learn more about how such reclamation work could be done. In 1978, McDade Park was dedicated and became the flagship of the Lackawanna County's park system.
- McDade Airport Terminal – In 2006 the Wilkes-Barre/Scranton International Airport Terminal building was named in honor of Congressman McDade. Congressman McDade's father played a key role in helping the Airport open. specifically, in 1941, John B. McDade, the congressman's father and president of the Heidelberg Coal Co., donated 122 acres (49 ha) (0.49 km^{2}) on which part of the Airport now sits. John B. McDade donated this land to "help the national defense in time of war." Thanks to land donated by John McDade, and purchased from others, the Wilkes-Barre/Scranton Airport opened June 1, 1947. In the 1990s the Airport infrastructure needed updating. Congressman McDade secured federal budgets and grants to accomplish this task.
- University of Scranton McDade Center for Literary and Performing Arts – The University of Scranton honored Congressman McDade by naming its Center for Literary and Performing Arts after him and by creating the McDade Center for Technology Transfer.
- McDade Recreational Trail, a 37-mile-long trail on the Pennsylvania side of the Delaware Water Gap National Recreation Area.
- McDade Trade and Transit Centre in downtown Williamsport, PA.

U.S. House of Representatives
Preceded by William Scranton	Member of the U.S. House of Representatives from Pennsylvania's 10th congressional district 1963–1999	Succeeded by Don Sherwood
Preceded by Silvio O. Conte	Ranking Member of the House Small Business Committee; 1979–1991	Succeeded by Andy Ireland
Preceded by Silvio O. Conte	Ranking Member of the House Appropriations Committee; 1991–1995	Succeeded by Dave Obey
