= 2010 United States House of Representatives elections in Pennsylvania =

- November 2, 2010

All 19 Pennsylvania seats to the United States House of Representatives
	Majority party	Minority party
Party	Republican	Democratic
Last election	7	12
Seats won	12	7
Seat change	▲5	▼5
Popular vote	2,034,145	1,882,202
Percentage	51.41%	47.57%
Swing	▲7.96%	▼7.88%

Repuublican hold Republican gain
Democratic hold
Republican
40–50%
50–60%
60–70%
70–80%
80–90%
>90%
Democratic
40–50%
50–60%
60–70%
70–80%
80–90%
>90%
Tie/No Data

The 2010 congressional elections in Pennsylvania were held on November 2, 2010. Pennsylvania had nineteen seats in the United States House of Representatives. The election was held on the same day as many other PA elections, and the same day as House of Representatives elections in other states. Party primary elections were held May 18, 2010.

== Overview ==
United States House of Representatives elections in Pennsylvania, 2010
Party	Votes	Percentage	Seats Before	Seats After	+/–
Republican	2,034,145	51.41%	7	12	+5
Democratic	1,882,202	47.57%	12	7	-5
Independent	40,054	1.01%	0	0	0
Totals	3,956,401	100.00%	19	19	—

=== By district ===
Results of the 2010 United States House of Representatives elections in Pennsylvania by district:

District	Republican		Democratic		Others		Total		Result
District	Votes	%	Votes	%	Votes	%	Votes	%	Result
District 1	0	0.00%	149,944	100.00%	0	0.00%	149,944	100.00%	Democratic hold
District 2	21,907	10.70%	182,800	89.30%	0	0.00%	204,707	100.00%	Democratic hold
District 3	111,909	55.72%	88,924	44.28%	0	0.00%	200,833	100.00%	Republican gain
District 4	116,958	49.19%	120,827	50.81%	0	0.00%	237,785	100.00%	Democratic hold
District 5	127,427	68.69%	52,375	28.23%	5,710	3.08%	185,512	100.00%	Republican hold
District 6	133,770	57.10%	100,493	42.90%	0	0.00%	234,263	100.00%	Republican hold
District 7	137,825	54.94%	110,314	43.98%	2,708	1.08%	250,847	100.00%	Republican gain
District 8	130,759	53.52%	113,547	46.48%	0	0.00%	244,306	100.00%	Republican gain
District 9	141,904	73.06%	52,322	26.94%	0	0.00%	194,226	100.00%	Republican hold
District 10	110,599	55.18%	89,846	44.82%	0	0.00%	200,445	100.00%	Republican gain
District 11	102,179	54.70%	84,618	45.30%	0	0.00%	186,797	100.00%	Republican gain
District 12	91,170	49.22%	94,056	50.78%	0	0.00%	185,226	100.00%	Democratic hold
District 13	91,987	43.66%	118,710	56.34%	0	0.00%	210,697	100.00%	Democratic hold
District 14	49,997	28.17%	122,073	68.79%	5,400	3.04%	177,470	100.00%	Democratic hold
District 15	109,534	53.55%	79,766	39.00%	15,248	7.45%	204,548	100.00%	Republican hold
District 16	134,113	65.39%	70,994	34.61%	0	0.00%	205,107	100.00%	Republican hold
District 17	95,000	44.50%	118,486	55.50%	0	0.00%	213,486	100.00%	Democratic hold
District 18	161,888	67.33%	78,558	32.67%	0	0.00%	240,446	100.00%	Republican hold
District 19	165,219	71.91%	53,549	23.31%	10,988	4.78%	229,756	100.00%	Republican hold
Total	2,034,145	51.41%	1,882,202	47.57%	40,054	1.01%	3,956,401	100.00%	

== District 1 ==
2010 Pennsylvania's 1st congressional district election
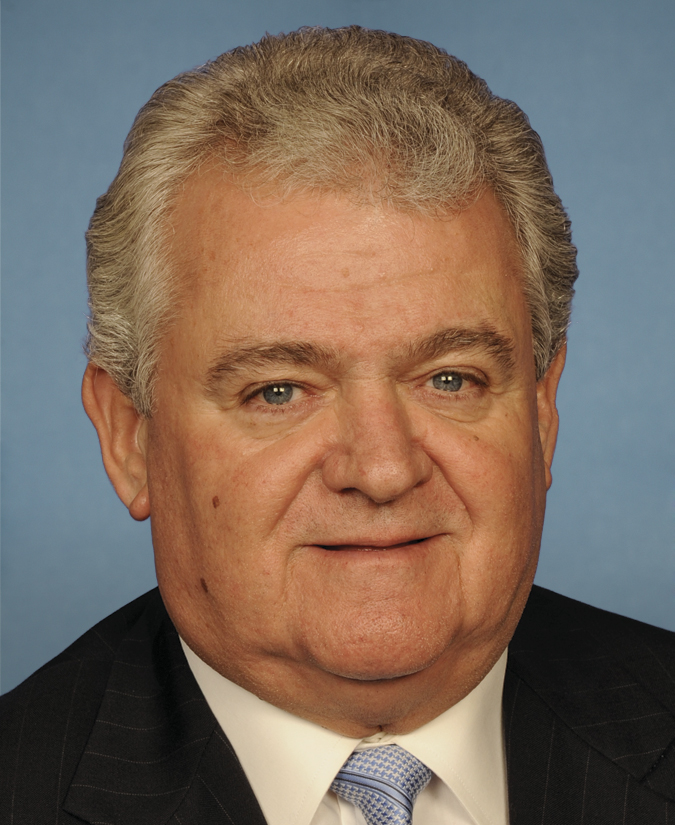
Nominee	Bob Brady
Party	Democratic
Popular vote	149,944
Percentage	100.00%
U.S. representative before election
Bob Brady
Democratic
Elected U.S. representative
Bob Brady
Democratic

Democratic incumbent Bob Brady was the only member of the Pennsylvania delegation who ran unopposed in 2010.

Brady, a long time central figure in the Pennsylvania Democratic Party, has never received less than 74% in a general election, and opponents have had difficult recruiting even moderately electable candidates in this majority-minority district that includes South Philadelphia and some working class suburbs in Delaware County. No Republican has represented this district since 1949. In 2008, he earned 91% of the vote against Mike Muhammad, a teacher who raised no outside funds. Respected for his ability to reach political deals behind the scenes, Brady has garnered an image as an effective politician, and thus has been rarely challenged by other Democrats. In 2010, Pia Varma, a young freelance writer for conservative publications attempted to gain the Republican nomination, but failed to produce enough signatures to appear on the ballot.

- PA - District 1 from OurCampaigns.com
- Race ranking and details from CQ Politics
- Campaign contributions from OpenSecrets

=== Democratic primary ===
==== Candidates ====
===== Nominee =====
- Bob Brady, incumbent U.S. Representative

==== Primary results ====
Democratic primary results
Party	Candidate	Votes	%
Democratic	Bob Brady (incumbent)	48,505	100.00
Total votes		48,505	100.00

=== Predictions ===
Source	Ranking	As of
The Cook Political Report	Safe D	November 1, 2010
Rothenberg	Safe D	November 1, 2010
Sabato's Crystal Ball	Safe D	November 1, 2010
RCP	Safe D	November 1, 2010
CQ Politics	Safe D	October 28, 2010
New York Times	Safe D	November 1, 2010
FiveThirtyEight	Safe D	November 1, 2010

=== General election ===
Pennsylvania's 1st congressional district election, 2010
Party	Candidate	Votes	%
Democratic	Bob Brady (incumbent)	149,944	100.00
Total votes		149,944	100.00

== District 2 ==
2010 Pennsylvania's 2nd congressional district election
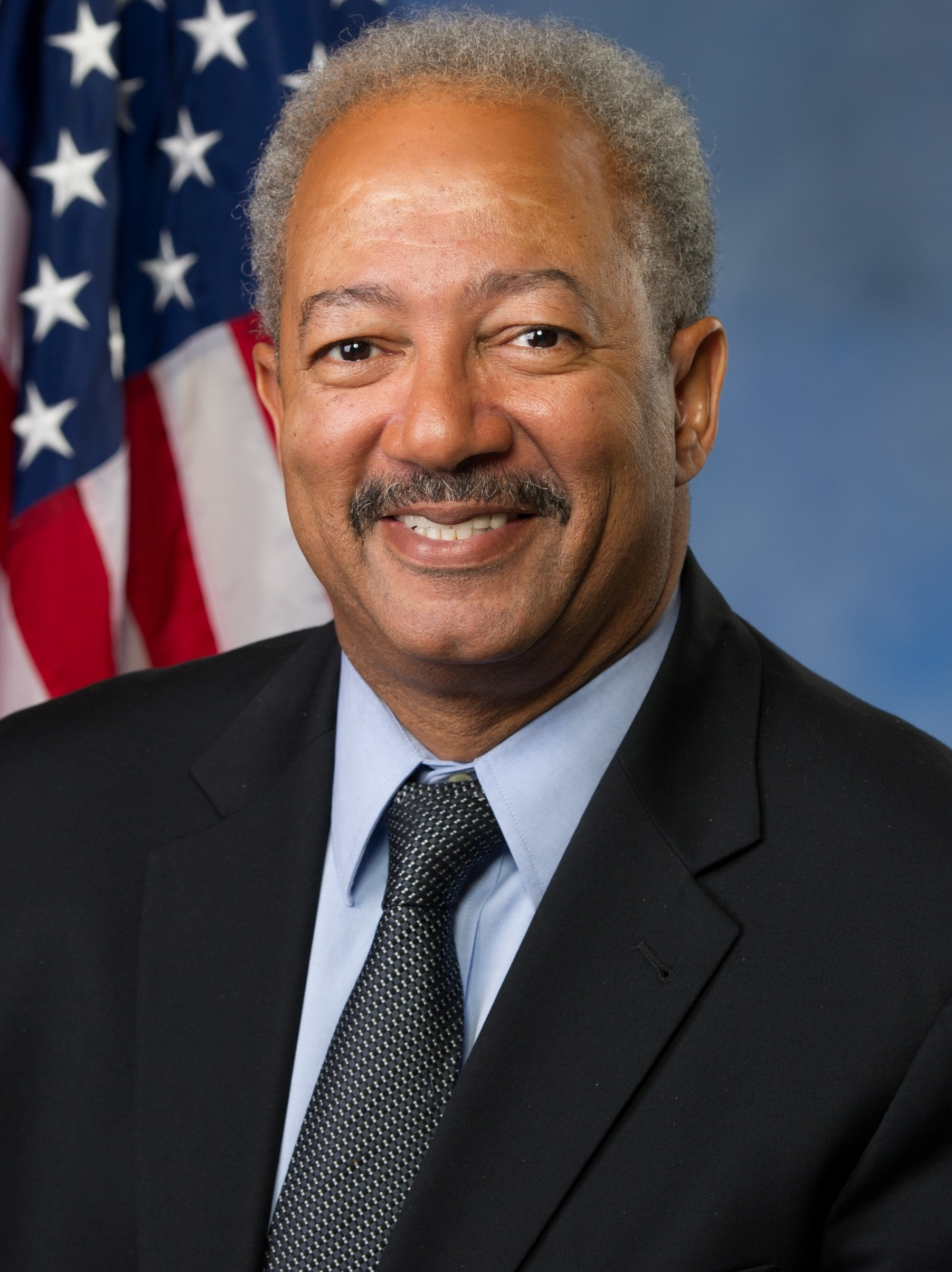

Nominee	Chaka Fattah	Rick Hellberg
Party	Democratic	Republican
Popular vote	182,800	21,907
Percentage	89.30%	10.70%
- County results Fattah: 70–80% 90–100%
U.S. representative before election
Chaka Fattah
Democratic
Elected U.S. representative
Chaka Fattah
Democratic

Democratic incumbent Chaka Fattah ran for reelection. He faced Republican Rick Hellberg, the CEO of a small financial firm. In 2008, Obama carried this district with 90% of the vote.

Fattah represents one of the top five most Democratic districts in the country, and has never received less than 79% of the vote in his over fifteen-year House career. The district includes North Philadelphia and several traditionally liberal suburbs in Montgomery County. Fattah has had the consistent support of the African American community that is the base of a district that hasn't swung Republican since the 1946 elections. Despite this huge Democratic advantage, the district has small pockets of solid Republican territory, and thus Fattah has continuously received GOP opponents (although ones who were unable to raise all more than a few thousand dollars in fundraising), unlike his counterpart in the 1st District. In 2008, Fattah defeated engineer Adam Lang with 81% of the vote.

Fattah won the 2010 general election with 89.3% of the vote.

- PA - District 2 from OurCampaigns.com
- Race ranking and details from CQ Politics
- Campaign contributions from OpenSecrets

=== Democratic primary ===
==== Candidates ====
===== Nominee =====
- Chaka Fattah, incumbent U.S. Representative

==== Primary results ====
Democratic primary results
Party	Candidate	Votes	%
Democratic	Chaka Fattah (incumbent)	72,417	100.00
Total votes		72,417	100.00

=== Republican primary ===
==== Candidates ====
===== Nominee =====
- Rick Hellberg, financial firm CEO

==== Primary results ====
Republican primary results
Party	Candidate	Votes	%
Republican	Rick Hellberg	3,781	100.00
Total votes		3,781	100.00

=== Predictions ===
Source	Ranking	As of
The Cook Political Report	Safe D	November 1, 2010
Rothenberg	Safe D	November 1, 2010
Sabato's Crystal Ball	Safe D	November 1, 2010
RCP	Safe D	November 1, 2010
CQ Politics	Safe D	October 28, 2010
New York Times	Safe D	November 1, 2010
FiveThirtyEight	Safe D	November 1, 2010

=== General election ===
Pennsylvania's 2nd congressional district election, 2010
Party	Candidate	Votes	%
Democratic	Chaka Fattah (incumbent)	182,800	89.30
Republican	Rick Hellberg	21,907	10.70
Total votes		204,707	100.00

== District 3 ==
2010 Pennsylvania's 3rd congressional district election
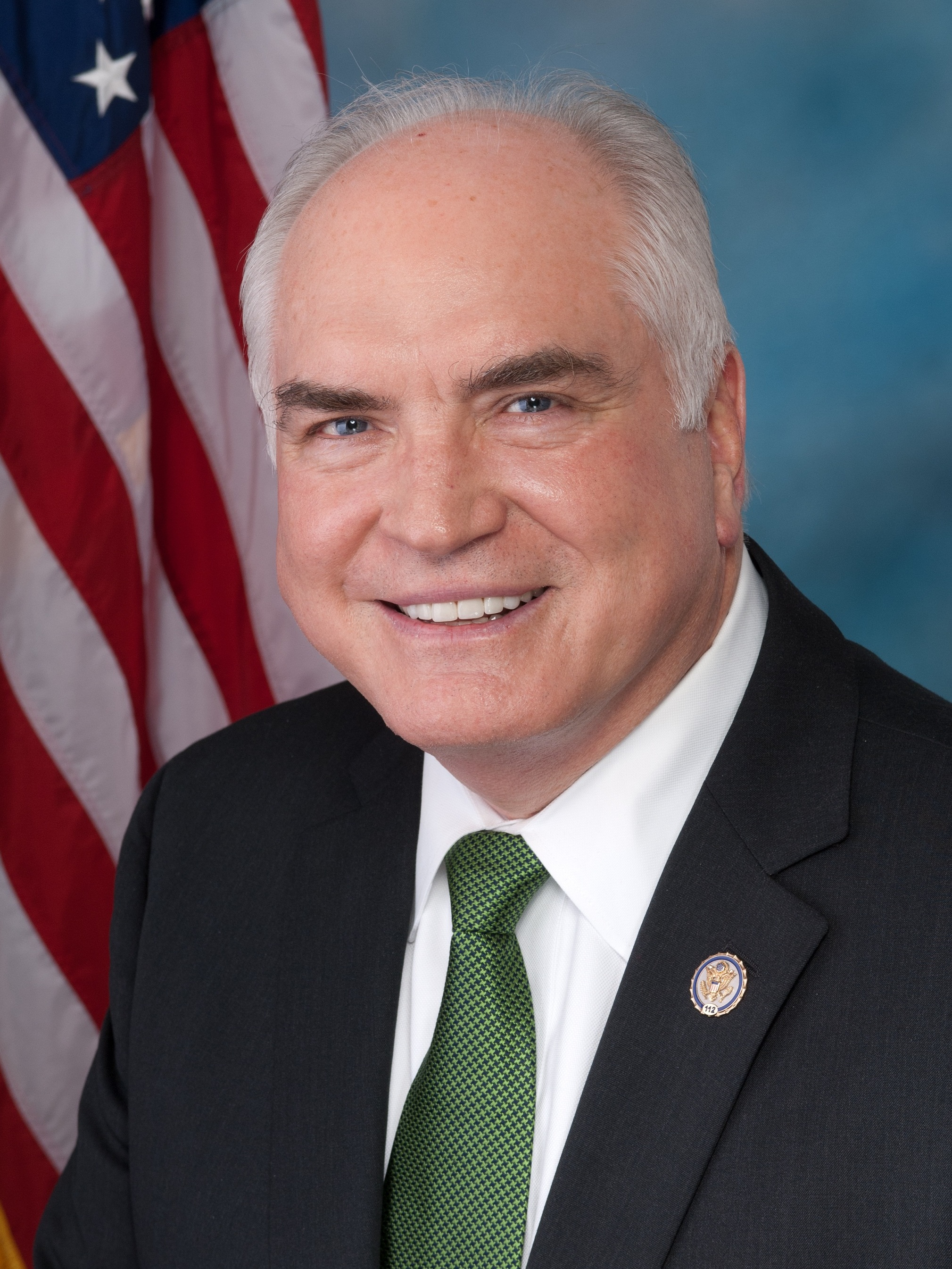

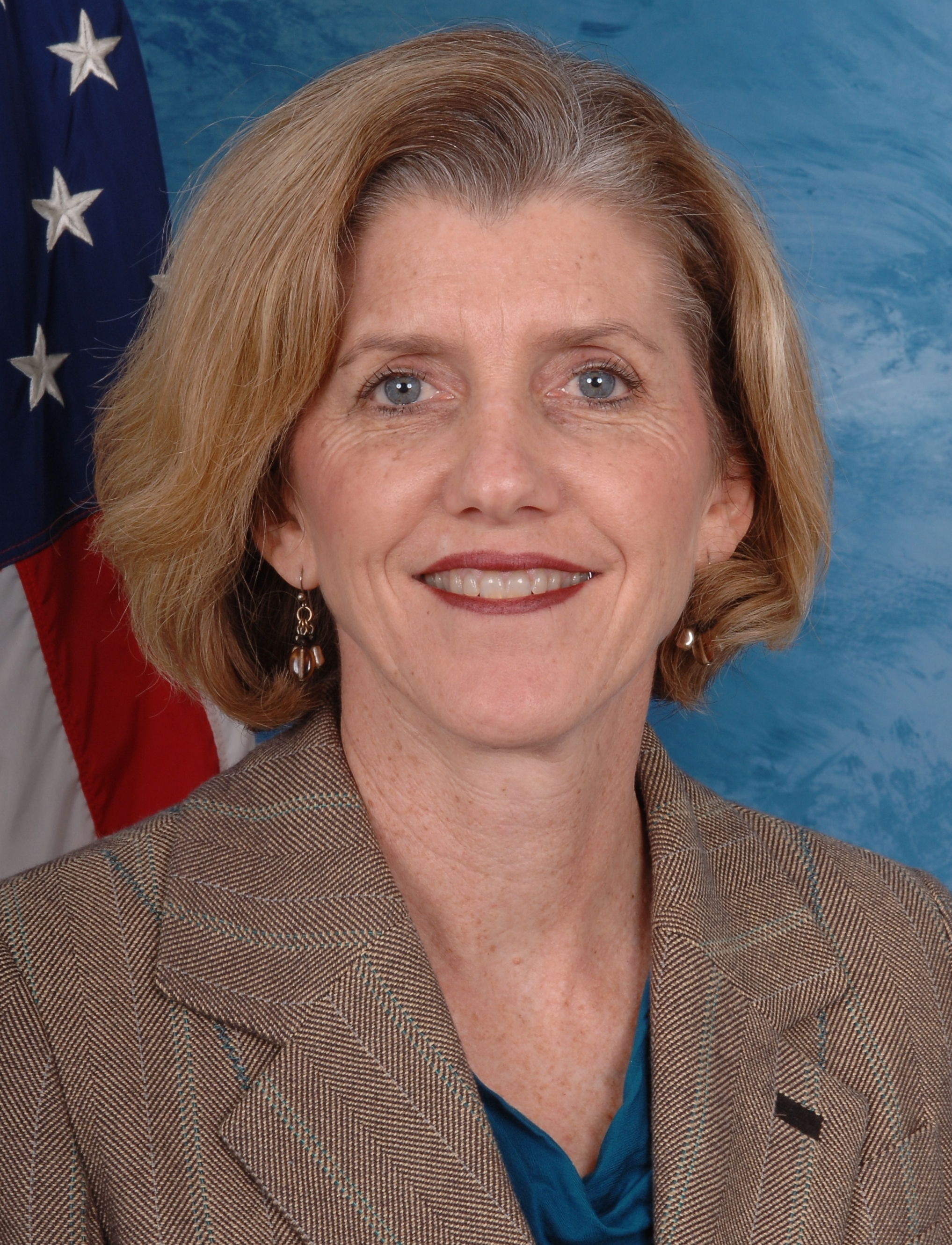
Nominee	Mike Kelly	Kathy Dahlkemper
Party	Republican	Democratic
Popular vote	111,909	88,924
Percentage	55.72%	44.28%
- County results Kelly: 50–60% 60–70% 70–80% Dahlkemper: 50–60%
U.S. representative before election
Kathy Dahlkemper
Democratic
Elected U.S. representative
Mike Kelly
Republican

Democratic incumbent Kathy Dahlkemper unsuccessfully ran for re-election, losing to Republican businessman Mike Kelly, who received 55.7% of the vote. In 2008, McCain carried this district with 49% of the vote.

Dahlkemper faced a difficult reelection bid, in a race that considered a tossup by most political analysts. Dahlkemper became used to tight campaigns in her short political career. A political unknown prior to her 2008 campaign, Dahlkemper leveraged a moderate, blue collar image that enticed Democratic voters in a district that is pro-union, with a center-right tilt on social issues. Dahlkemper, the owner of a large landscaping business and manager of an Erie County arboretum, came from behind to defeat Erie County Concilman Kyle Foust, the endorsed Democratic candidate. She then went on to narrowly unseat (with 52% of the vote) Congressman Phil English, a moderate Republican who had maintained good relations with labor, by attacking his ties to the Bush administration and for failing to follow through on a promise to retire after six terms. During her first term, Dahlkemper has served as a member of the Blue Dog Coalition of conservative Democrats, which has allowed her to keep a middle ground image. However, her vote in favor of healthcare legislation and the lack of an entrenched image in certain corners of the district left her vulnerable.

In 2010, Dahlkemper faced a primary challenge from former foreign affairs official Mel Marin, winning with 73% of the vote. Republicans focused heavily on regaining the seat, and six GOP candidates earned spots on the ballot: automobile dealer Mike Kelly, manufacturing executive Paul Huber, pharmaceutical representative Clayton Grabb, physician Steve Fisher, factory foreman Ed Franz, and accountant Martha Moore. Kelly and Huber far outraised the remaining four challengers, and they became entangled in an expensive campaign. Kelly was eventually victorious, winning 28% of the vote to Huber's 27% in the factious affair.

Kelly, a former member of the Butler City Council, had a base of support in the heavily Republican Butler County, while Dahlkemper was well known in Erie, the center of population for the district. Other small cities in the district, such as Sharon and Meadville were swing regions, with a slightly conservative tilt that balanced out strongly Democratic Erie. John McCain carried the 3rd District by a 49%-48% margin, which reflects the political balance of the area.

- PA - District 3 from OurCampaigns.com
- Race ranking and details from CQ Politics
- Campaign contributions from OpenSecrets

=== Democratic primary ===
==== Candidates ====
===== Nominee =====
- Kathy Dahlkemper, incumbent U.S. Representative

===== Eliminated in primary =====
- Mel Marin, foreign affairs official

==== Primary results ====
Democratic primary results
Party	Candidate	Votes	%
Democratic	Kathy Dahlkemper (incumbent)	34,932	73.24
Democratic	Mel Marin	12,764	26.76
Total votes		47,696	100.00

=== Republican primary ===
==== Candidates ====
===== Nominee =====
- Mike Kelly, automobile dealer

===== Eliminated in primary =====
- Steven Fisher, physician
- Ed Franz, factory foreman
- Clayton Grabb, pharmaceutical representative
- Paul Huber, manufacturing executive
- Martha Moore, accountant

==== Primary results ====
Republican primary results
Party	Candidate	Votes	%
Republican	Mike Kelly	15,428	28.11
Republican	Paul Huber	14,474	26.38
Republican	Clayton Grabb	7,486	13.64
Republican	Steven Fisher	6,499	11.84
Republican	Ed Franz	5,838	10.64
Republican	Martha Moore	5,151	9.39
Total votes		54,876	100.00

=== Polling ===
Poll source	Date(s) administered	Sample size	Margin of error	Kathy Dahlkemper (D)	Mike Kelly (R)	Undecided
The Hill/ANG Alliance	September 25–27, 2010	401	± 4.9%	36%	49%	15%
Franklin-Marshall	September 14–19, 2010	482	± 4.5%	38%	44%	18%
The Polling Company	July 29-August 1, 2010	314	± 5.5%	46%	42%	11%

=== Predictions ===
Source	Ranking	As of
The Cook Political Report	Lean R (flip)	November 1, 2010
Rothenberg	Likely R (flip)	November 1, 2010
Sabato's Crystal Ball	Lean R (flip)	November 1, 2010
RCP	Lean R (flip)	November 1, 2010
CQ Politics	Likely R (flip)	October 28, 2010
New York Times	Lean R (flip)	November 1, 2010
FiveThirtyEight	Likely R (flip)	November 1, 2010

=== Debate ===
2010 Pennsylvania's 3rd congressional district debate
No.	Date	Host	Moderator	Link	Democratic	Republican
Key: P Participant A Absent N Not invited I Invited W Withdrawn						
Key: P Participant A Absent N Not invited I Invited W Withdrawn					Kathy Dahlkemper	Mike Kelly
1	Oct. 21, 2010	Allegheny College Center for Political Participation; Pennsylvania Cable Network	Keith Gushard; Dan Shea	C-SPAN	P	P

=== General election ===
Pennsylvania's 3rd congressional district election, 2010
Party	Candidate	Votes	%
Republican	Mike Kelly	111,909	55.72
Democratic	Kathy Dahlkemper (incumbent)	88,924	44.28
Total votes		200,833	100.00

== District 4 ==
2010 Pennsylvania's 4th congressional district election
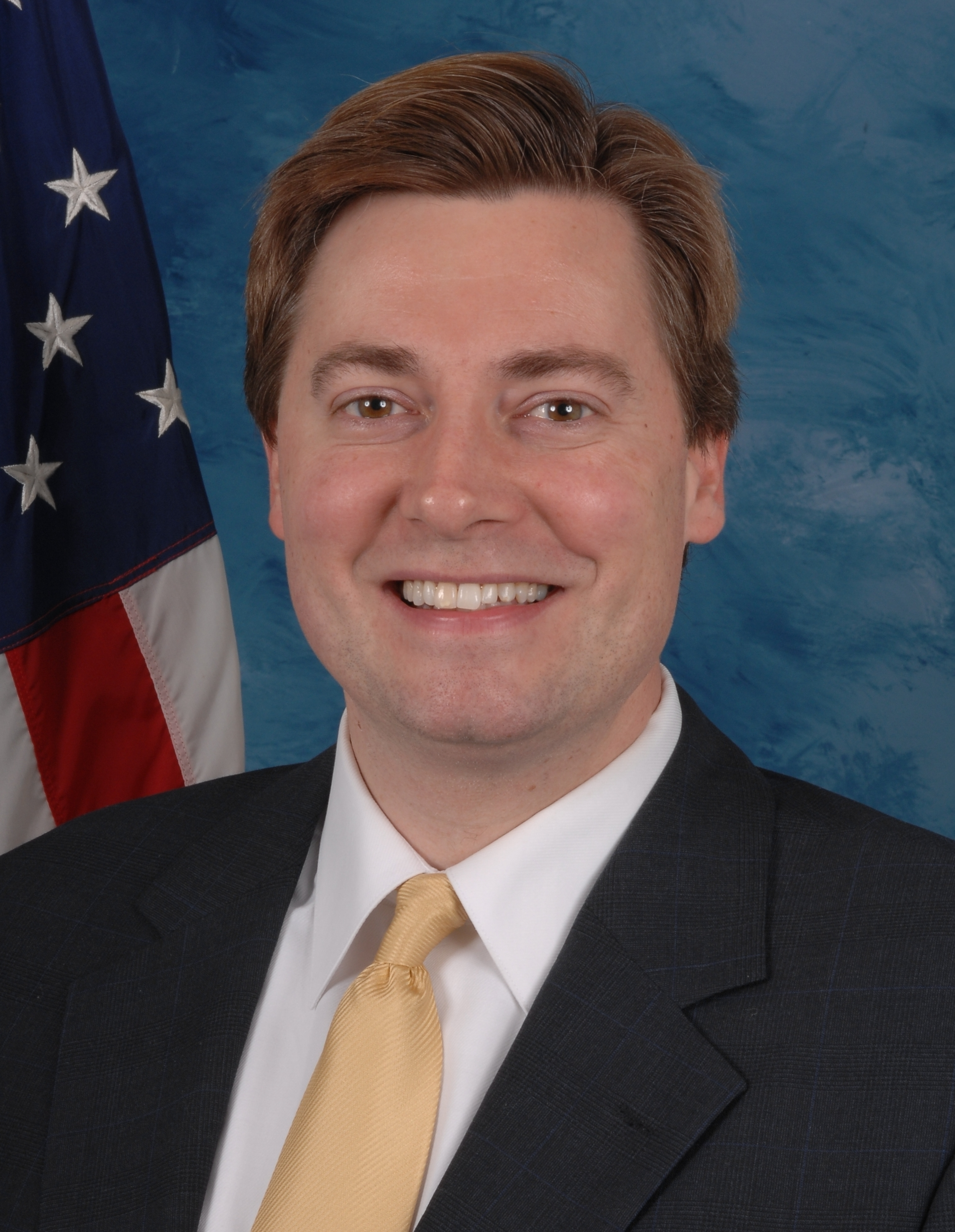

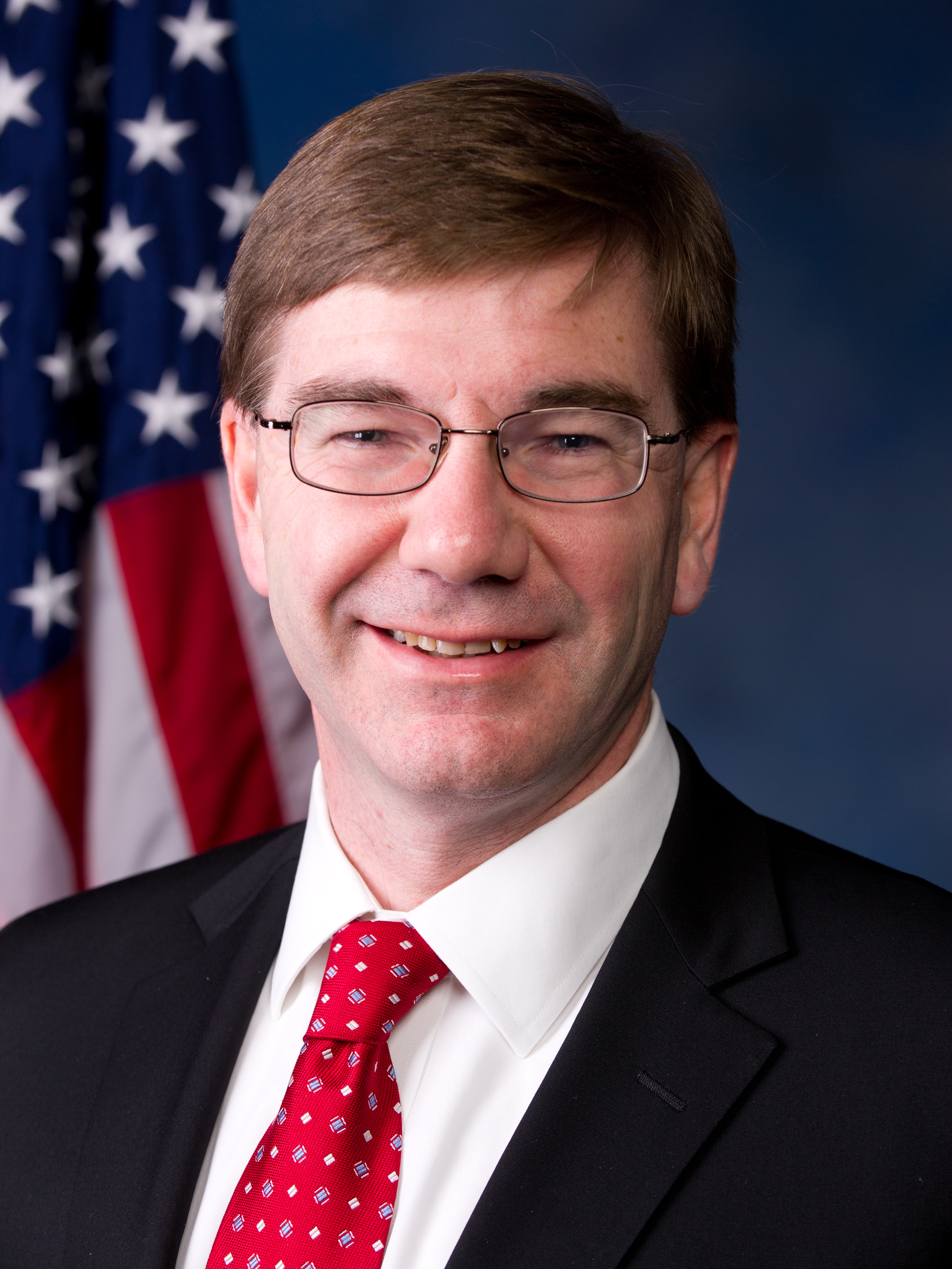
Nominee	Jason Altmire	Keith Rothfus
Party	Democratic	Republican
Popular vote	120,827	116,958
Percentage	50.81%	49.19%
- County results Altmire: 50–60% 60–70% Rothfus: 50–60% 60–70%
U.S. representative before election
Jason Altmire
Democratic
Elected U.S. representative
Jason Altmire
Democratic

Democratic incumbent Jason Altmire ran for re-election and faced Republican attorney Keith Rothfus. In 2008, McCain carried this district with 55% of the vote.

Altmire narrowly won re-election with 50.8% of the vote.

- PA - District 4 from OurCampaigns.com
- Race ranking and details from CQ Politics
- Campaign contributions from OpenSecrets

=== Democratic primary ===
==== Candidates ====
===== Nominee =====
- Jason Altmire, incumbent U.S. Representative

==== Primary results ====
Democratic primary results
Party	Candidate	Votes	%
Democratic	Jason Altmire (incumbent)	53,019	100.00
Total votes		53,019	100.00

=== Republican primary ===
==== Candidates ====
===== Nominee =====
- Keith Rothfus, attorney

===== Eliminated in primary =====
- Mary Beth Buchanan, former United States Attorney for the Western District of Pennsylvania

==== Primary results ====
Republican primary results
Party	Candidate	Votes	%
Republican	Keith Rothfus	34,996	66.41
Republican	Mary Beth Buchanan	17,701	33.59
Total votes		52,697	100.00

=== Predictions ===
Source	Ranking	As of
The Cook Political Report	Lean D	November 1, 2010
Rothenberg	Likely D	November 1, 2010
Sabato's Crystal Ball	Likely D	November 1, 2010
RCP	Lean D	November 1, 2010
CQ Politics	Likely D	October 28, 2010
New York Times	Lean D	November 1, 2010
FiveThirtyEight	Likely D	November 1, 2010

=== General election ===
Pennsylvania's 4th congressional district election, 2010
Party	Candidate	Votes	%
Democratic	Jason Altmire (incumbent)	120,827	50.81
Republican	Keith Rothfus	116,958	49.19
Total votes		237,785	100.00

== District 5 ==
2010 Pennsylvania's 5th congressional district election
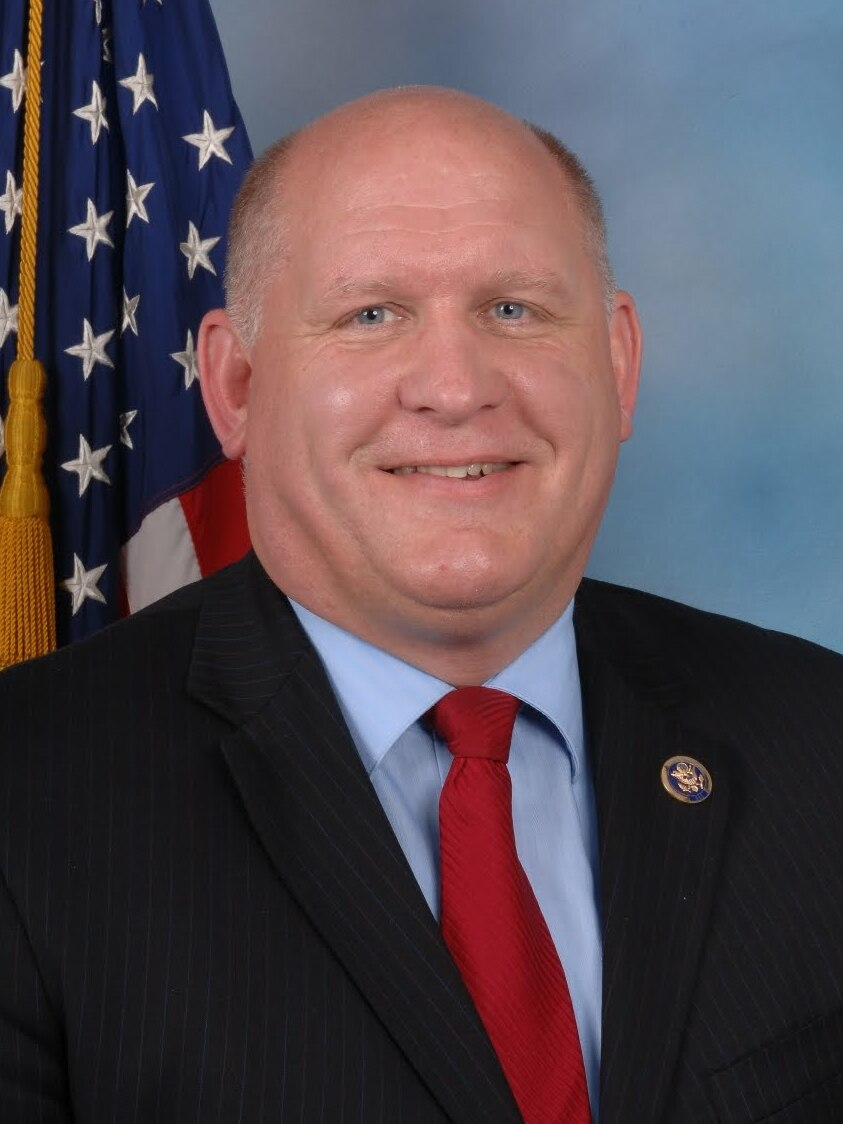

Nominee	Glenn Thompson	Michael Pipe
Party	Republican	Democratic
Popular vote	127,427	52,375
Percentage	68.69%	28.23%
- County results Thompson: 50–60% 60–70% 70–80% 80–90%
U.S. representative before election
Glenn Thompson
Republican
Elected U.S. representative
Glenn Thompson
Republican

Republican incumbent Glenn "G.T." Thompson successfully ran for re-election. He defeated Democrat Michael Pipe and Libertarian Vernon Etzel. In 2008, McCain carried this district with 55% of the vote.

- PA - District 5 from OurCampaigns.com
- Race ranking and details from CQ Politics
- Campaign contributions from OpenSecrets

=== Democratic primary ===
==== Candidates ====
===== Nominee =====
- Michael Pipe

==== Primary results ====
Democratic primary results
Party	Candidate	Votes	%
Democratic	Michael Pipe	31,120	100.00
Total votes		31,120	100.00

=== Republican primary ===
==== Candidates ====
===== Nominee =====
- Glenn Thompson, incumbent U.S. Representative

==== Primary results ====
Republican primary results
Party	Candidate	Votes	%
Republican	Glenn Thompson (incumbent)	52,856	100.00
Total votes		52,856	100.00

=== Predictions ===
Source	Ranking	As of
The Cook Political Report	Safe R	November 1, 2010
Rothenberg	Safe R	November 1, 2010
Sabato's Crystal Ball	Safe R	November 1, 2010
RCP	Safe R	November 1, 2010
CQ Politics	Safe R	October 28, 2010
New York Times	Safe R	November 1, 2010
FiveThirtyEight	Safe R	November 1, 2010

=== General election ===
Pennsylvania's 5th congressional district election, 2010
Party	Candidate	Votes	%
Republican	Glenn Thompson (incumbent)	127,427	68.69
Democratic	Michael Pipe	52,375	28.23
Libertarian	Vernon Etzel	5,710	3.08
Total votes		185,512	100.00

== District 6 ==
2010 Pennsylvania's 6th congressional district election
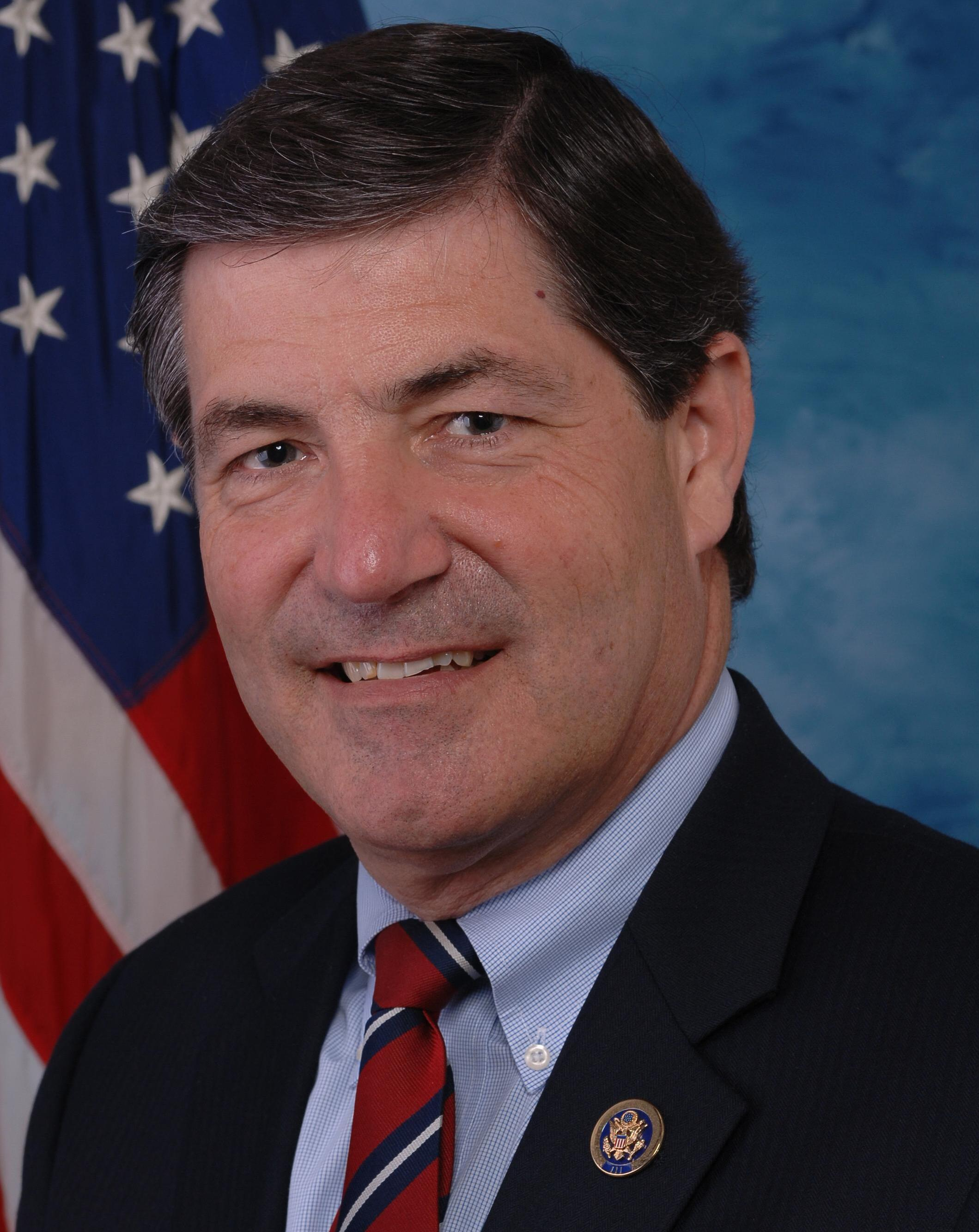

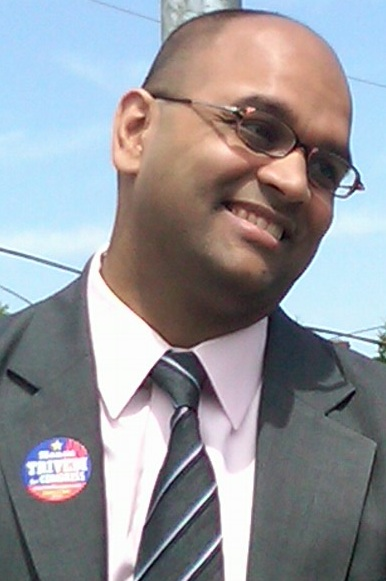
Nominee	Jim Gerlach	Manan Trivedi
Party	Republican	Democratic
Popular vote	133,770	100,493
Percentage	57.10%	42.90%
- County results Gerlach: 60–70% Trivedi: 50–60%
U.S. representative before election
Jim Gerlach
Republican
Elected U.S. representative
Jim Gerlach
Republican

Republican incumbent Jim Gerlach successfully ran for re-election. He defeated Democrat Iraq War veteran Manan Trivedi. In 2008, Obama carried this district with 58% of the vote.

- PA - District 6 from OurCampaigns.com
- Race ranking and details from CQ Politics
- Campaign contributions from OpenSecrets

=== Democratic primary ===
==== Nominee ====
- Manan Trivedi, physician and Iraq War veteran

==== Eliminated in primary ====
- Doug Pike

==== Primary results ====
Democratic primary results
Party	Candidate	Votes	%
Democratic	Manan Trivedi	21,585	50.84
Democratic	Doug Pike	20,871	49.16
Total votes		42,456	100.0

=== Republican primary ===
==== Nominee ====
- Jim Gerlach, incumbent U.S. Representative

==== Eliminated in primary ====
- Patrick Henry Sellers

==== Primary results ====
Republican primary results
Party	Candidate	Votes	%
Republican	Jim Gerlach (incumbent)	35,575	79.81
Republican	Patrick Henry Sellers	8,998	20.19
Total votes		44,573	100.00

=== Predictions ===
Source	Ranking	As of
The Cook Political Report	Likely R	November 1, 2010
Rothenberg	Safe R	November 1, 2010
Sabato's Crystal Ball	Likely R	November 1, 2010
RCP	Safe R	November 1, 2010
CQ Politics	Lean R	October 28, 2010
New York Times	Safe R	November 1, 2010
FiveThirtyEight	Lean R	November 1, 2010

=== General election ===
Pennsylvania's 6th congressional district election, 2010
Party	Candidate	Votes	%
Republican	Jim Gerlach (incumbent)	133,770	57.10
Democratic	Manan Trivedi	100,493	42.90
Total votes		234,263	100.00

== District 7 ==
2010 Pennsylvania's 7th congressional district election
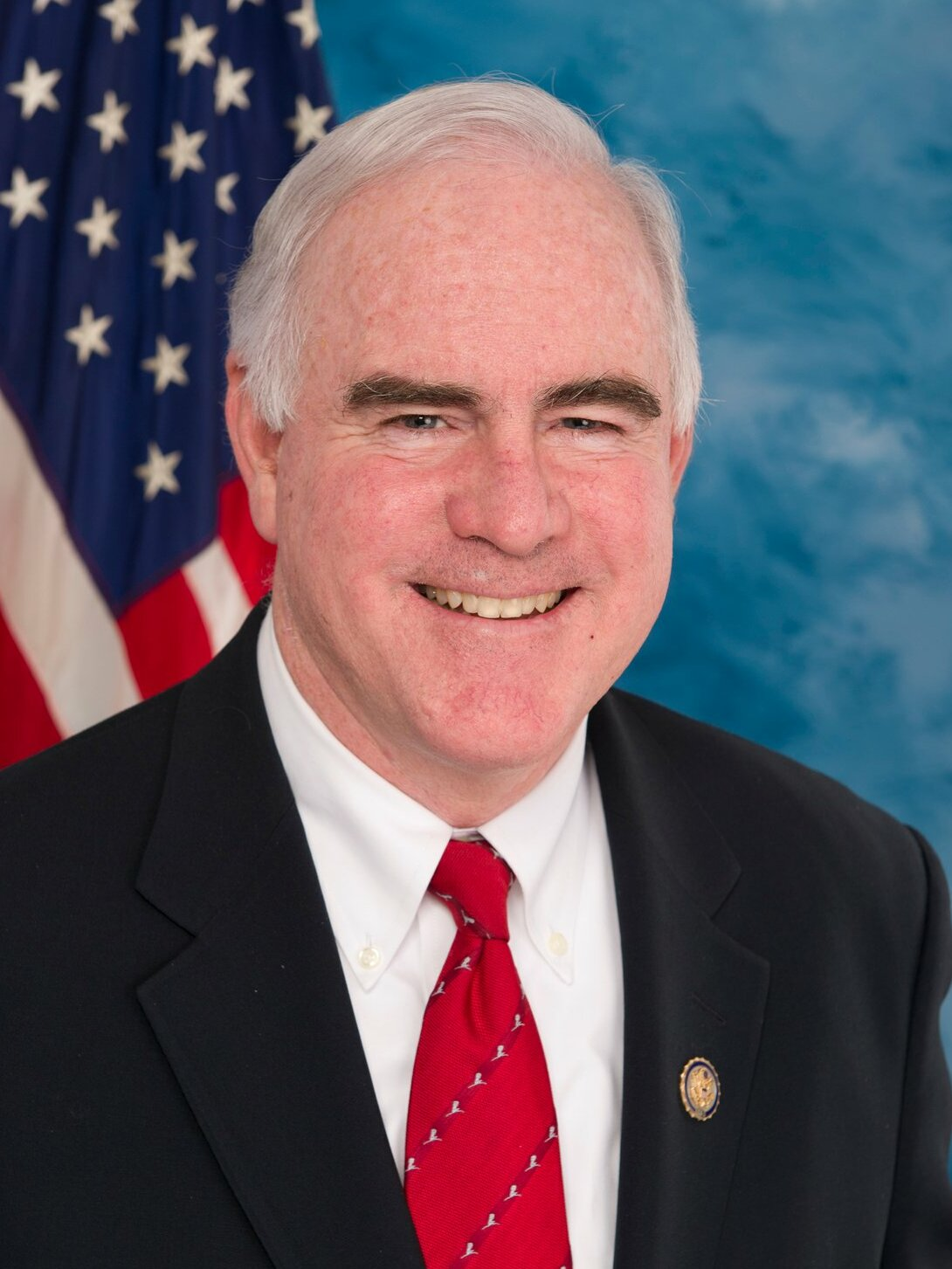

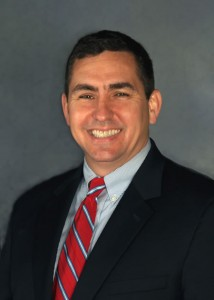
Nominee	Pat Meehan	Bryan Lentz
Party	Republican	Democratic
Popular vote	134,751	108,197
Percentage	54.86%	44.05%
U.S. representative before election
Joe Sestak
Democratic
Elected U.S. representative
Pat Meehan
Republican

Democratic incumbent Joe Sestak retired to run for the U.S. Senate. Democratic nominee State Representative Bryan Lentz faced Republican nominee U.S. Attorney Pat Meehan and American Constitution Party (independent) nominee Jim Schneller.

- PA - District 7 from OurCampaigns.com
- Race ranking and details from CQ Politics
- Campaign contributions from OpenSecrets

=== Democratic primary ===
==== Nominee ====
- Bryan Lentz, State Representative

==== Primary results ====
Democratic primary results
Party	Candidate	Votes	%
Democratic	Bryan Lentz	39,206	100.00
Total votes		39,206	100.00

=== Republican primary ===
==== Nominee ====
- Pat Meehan, former United States Attorney for the Eastern District of Pennsylvania

==== Primary results ====
Republican primary results
Party	Candidate	Votes	%
Republican	Pat Meehan	48,604	100.00
Total votes		48,604	100.00

=== Predictions ===
Source	Ranking	As of
The Cook Political Report	Lean R (flip)	November 1, 2010
Rothenberg	Tilt R (flip)	November 1, 2010
Sabato's Crystal Ball	Lean R (flip)	November 1, 2010
RCP	Tossup	November 1, 2010
CQ Politics	Tossup	October 28, 2010
New York Times	Lean R (flip)	November 1, 2010
FiveThirtyEight	Lean R (flip)	November 1, 2010

=== General election ===
Pennsylvania's 7th congressional district election, 2010
Party	Candidate	Votes	%
Republican	Pat Meehan	134,751	54.86
Democratic	Bryan Lentz	108,197	44.05
Independent	Jim Schneller	2,670	1.09
Total votes		245,618	100.00

== District 8 ==
2010 Pennsylvania's 8th congressional district election
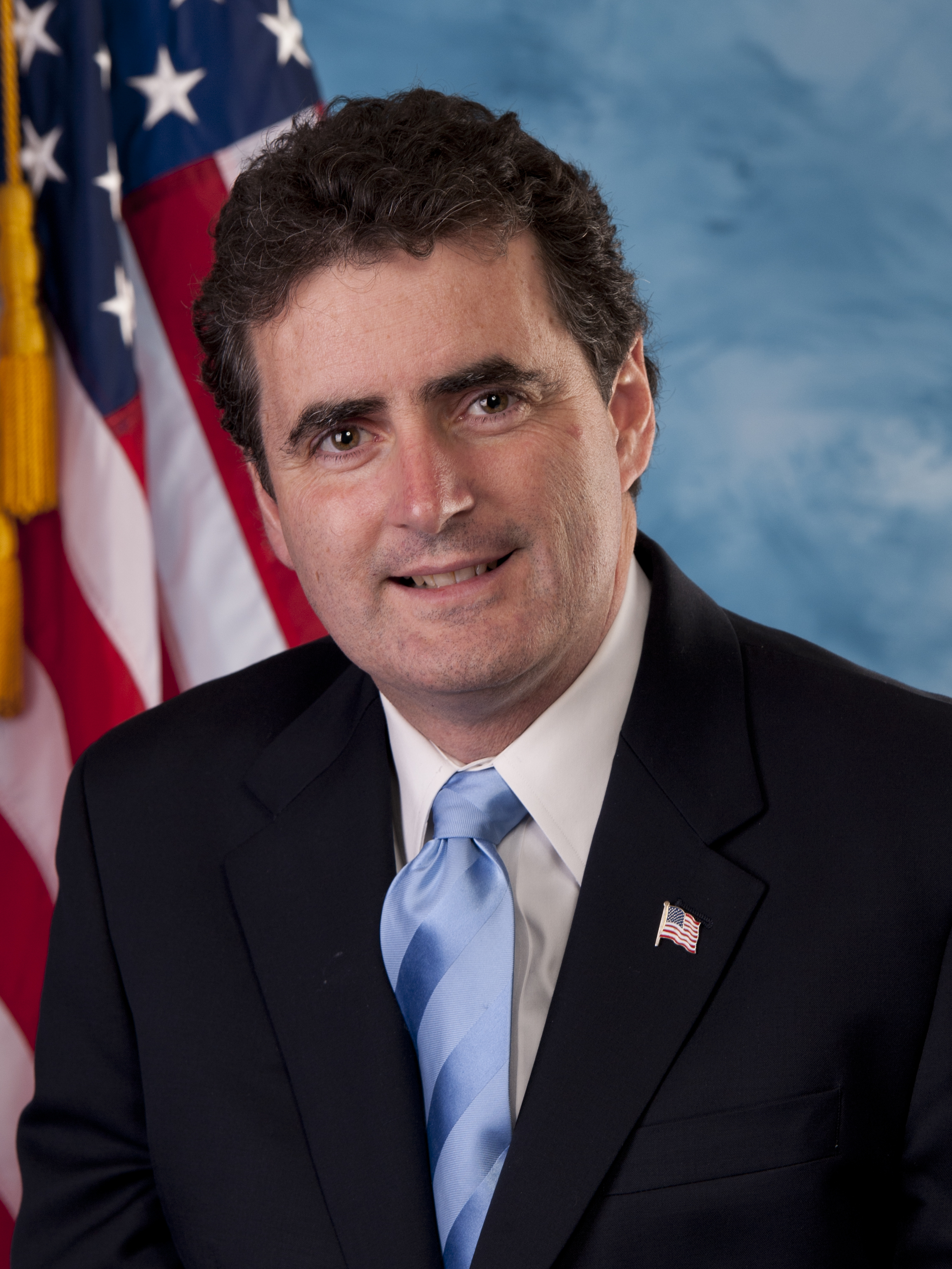

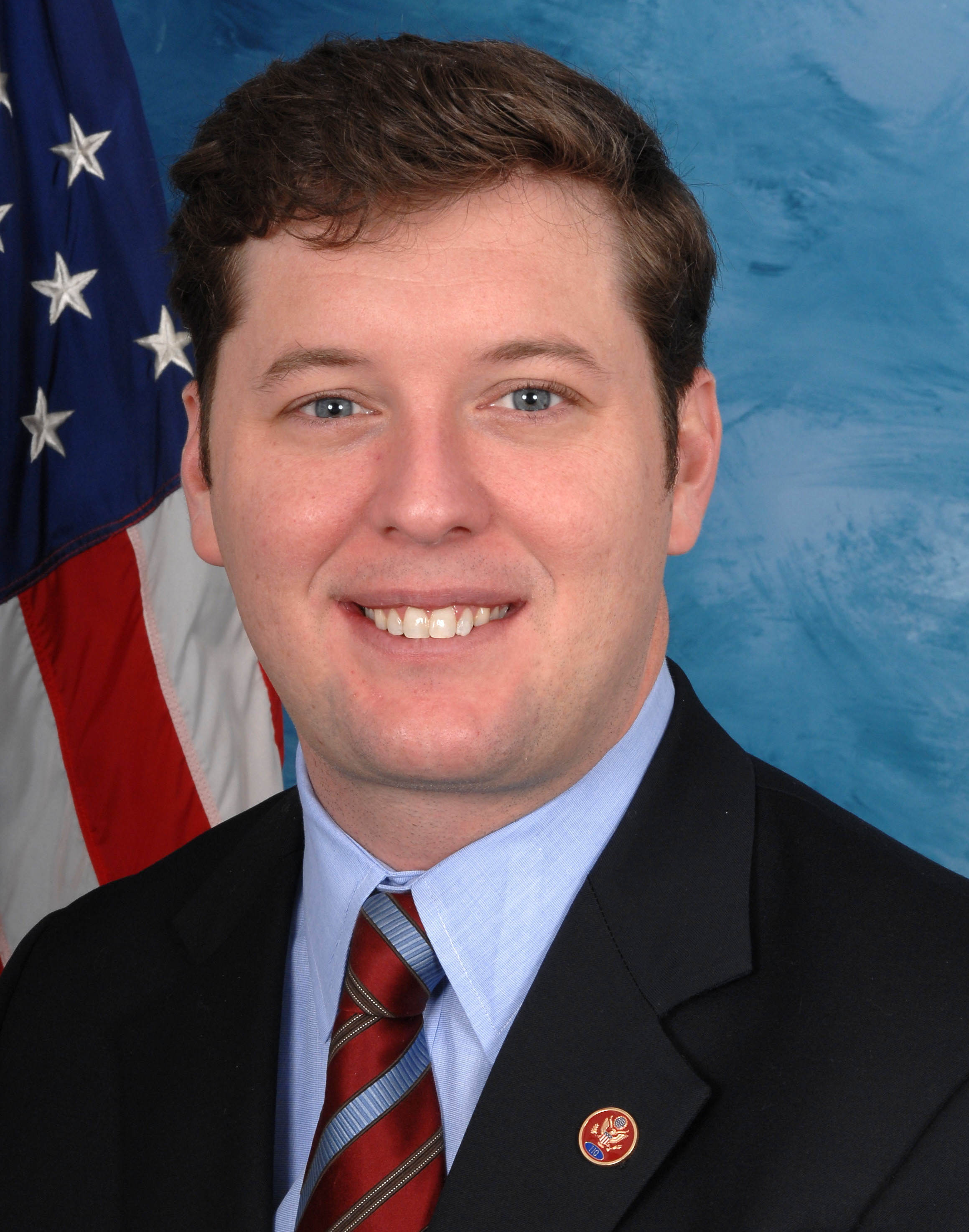
Nominee	Mike Fitzpatrick	Patrick Murphy
Party	Republican	Democratic
Popular vote	130,759	113,547
Percentage	53.52%	46.48%
- County results Fitzpatrick: 50–60% Murphy: 50–60% 60–70%
U.S. representative before election
Patrick Murphy
Democratic
Elected U.S. representative
Mike Fitzpatrick
Republican

Democratic incumbent Patrick Murphy unsuccessfully ran for re-election. He was defeated by Republican former U.S. Congressman Mike Fitzpatrick. In 2008, Obama carried this district with 54% of the vote.

- PA - District 8 from OurCampaigns.com
- Race ranking and details from CQ Politics
- Campaign contributions from OpenSecrets

=== Democratic primary ===
==== Nominee ====
- Patrick Murphy, incumbent U.S. Representative

==== Primary results ====
Democratic primary results
Party	Candidate	Votes	%
Democratic	Patrick Murphy (incumbent)	40,783	100.00
Total votes		40,783	100.00

=== Republican primary ===
==== Nominee ====
- Mike Fitzpatrick, former U.S. Representative (2005 – 2007)

==== Eliminated in primary ====
- Gloria Carlineo
- Ira Hoffman
- James Jones

==== Primary results ====
Republican primary results
Party	Candidate	Votes	%
Republican	Mike Fitzpatrick	33,671	76.75
Republican	Gloria Carlineo	6,529	14.88
Republican	Ira Hoffman	2,424	5.52
Republican	James Jones	1,249	2.85
Total votes		43,873	100.00

=== Polling ===
Poll source	Date(s) administered	Sample size	Margin of error	Patrick Murphy (D)	Mike Fitzpatrick (R)	Undecided
Franklin-Marshall	September 14–19, 2010	464	± 4.6%	35%	49%	15%
Franklin-Marshall	October 14–19, 2010	464	± 4.6%	40%	47%	5%
Franklin-Marshall	October 24–29, 2010	464	± 4.6%	35%	55%	5%

=== Predictions ===
Source	Ranking	As of
The Cook Political Report	Tossup	November 1, 2010
Rothenberg	Tilt R (flip)	November 1, 2010
Sabato's Crystal Ball	Lean R (flip)	November 1, 2010
RCP	Tossup	November 1, 2010
CQ Politics	Tossup	October 28, 2010
New York Times	Tossup	November 1, 2010
FiveThirtyEight	Lean R (flip)	November 1, 2010

=== General election ===
Pennsylvania's 8th congressional district election, 2010
Party	Candidate	Votes	%
Republican	Mike Fitzpatrick	130,759	53.52
Democratic	Patrick Murphy (incumbent)	113,547	46.48
Total votes		244,306	100.00

== District 9 ==
2010 Pennsylvania's 9th congressional district election
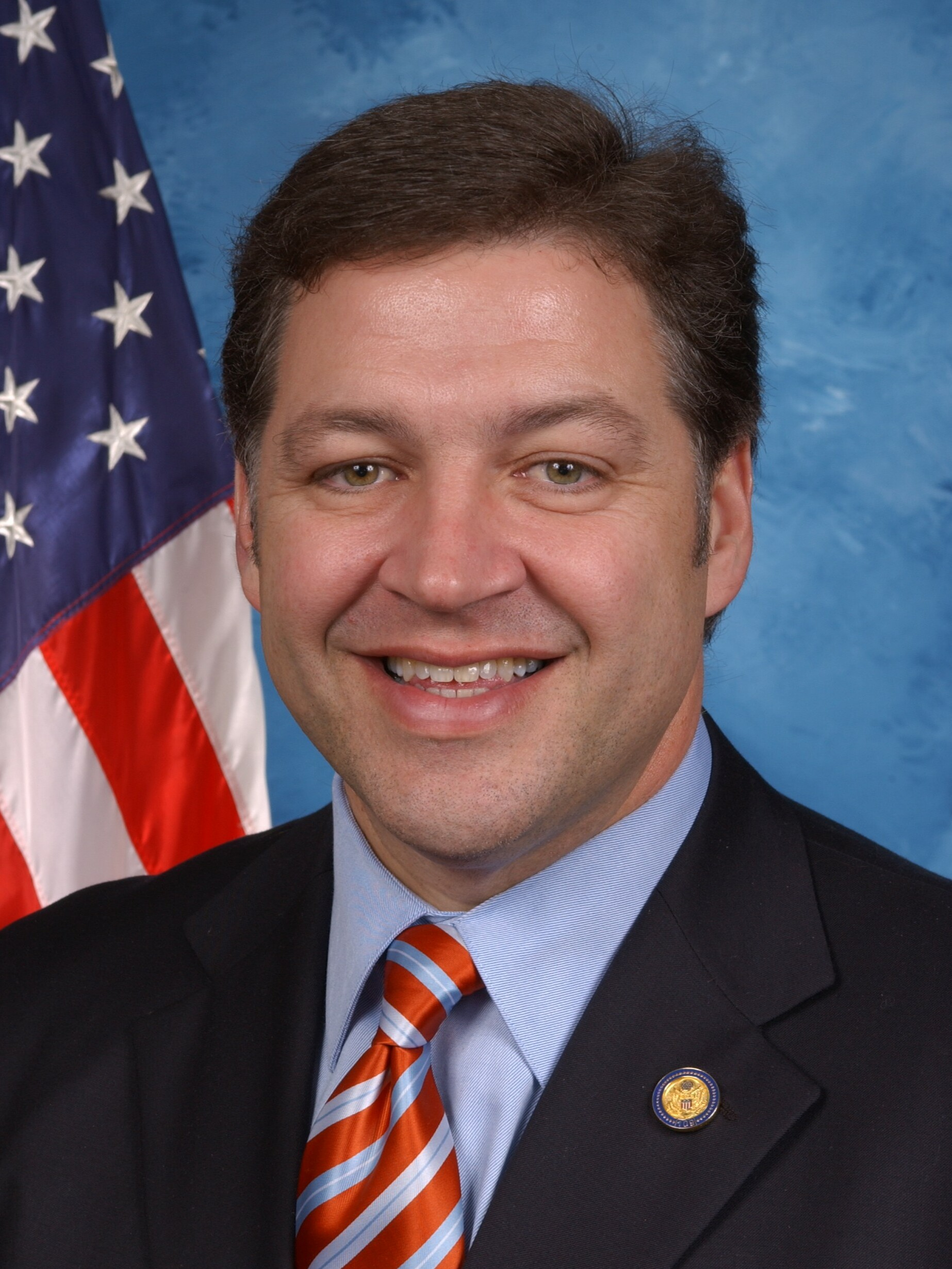

Nominee	Bill Shuster	Tom Conners
Party	Republican	Democratic
Popular vote	141,904	52,322
Percentage	73.06%	26.94%
- County results Shuster: 60–70% 70–80%
U.S. representative before election
Bill Shuster
Republican
Elected U.S. representative
Bill Shuster
Republican

Republican incumbent Bill Shuster successfully ran for re-election. He defeated Democrat Tom Conners and Independent Chad Clopper.

- PA - District 9 from OurCampaigns.com
- Race ranking and details from CQ Politics
- Campaign contributions from OpenSecrets

=== Republican primary ===
==== Nominee ====
- Bill Shuster, incumbent U.S. Representative

==== Primary results ====
Republican primary results
Party	Candidate	Votes	%
Republican	Bill Shuster (incumbent)	56,828	100.00
Total votes		56,828	100.00

=== Predictions ===
Source	Ranking	As of
The Cook Political Report	Safe R	November 1, 2010
Rothenberg	Safe R	November 1, 2010
Sabato's Crystal Ball	Safe R	November 1, 2010
RCP	Safe R	November 1, 2010
CQ Politics	Safe R	October 28, 2010
New York Times	Safe R	November 1, 2010
FiveThirtyEight	Safe R	November 1, 2010

=== General election ===
Pennsylvania's 9th congressional district election, 2010
Party	Candidate	Votes	%
Republican	Bill Shuster	141,904	73.06
Democratic	Tom Conners	52,322	26.94
Total votes		194,226	100.00

== District 10 ==
2010 Pennsylvania's 10th congressional district election
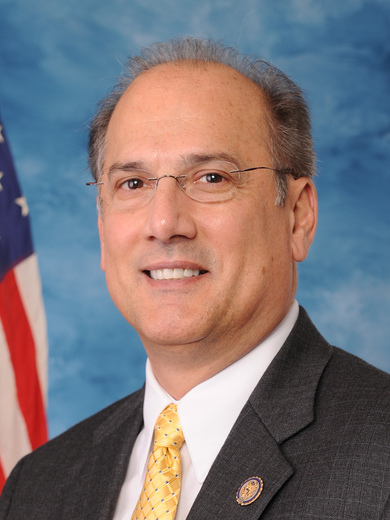

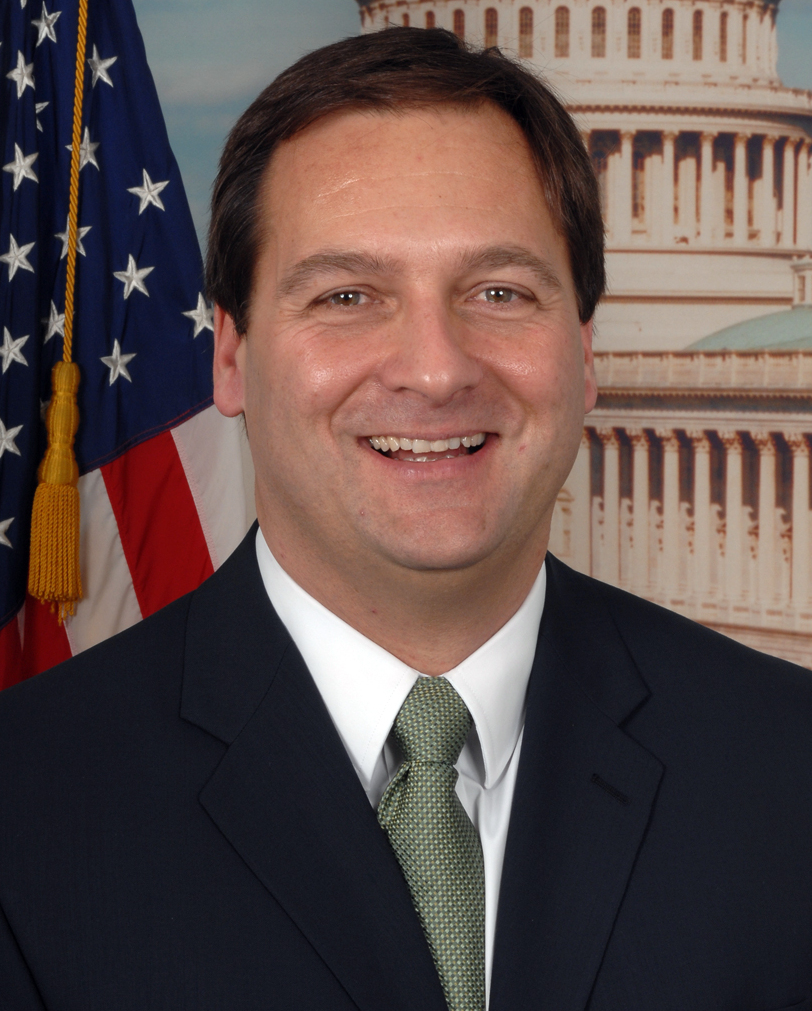
Nominee	Tom Marino	Chris Carney
Party	Republican	Democratic
Popular vote	110,599	89,846
Percentage	55.18%	44.82%
- County results Carney: 50–60% 60–70% Marino: 50–60% 60–70%
U.S. representative before election
Chris Carney
Democratic
Elected U.S. representative
Tom Marino
Republican

Democratic incumbent Chris Carney unsuccessfully ran for re-election, losing to Republican nominee U.S. Attorney Tom Marino. In 2008, McCain carried this district with 54% of the vote.

- PA - District 10 from OurCampaigns.com
- Race ranking and details from CQ Politics
- Campaign contributions from OpenSecrets

=== Democratic primary ===
==== Nominee ====
- Chris Carney, incumbent U.S. Representative

==== Primary results ====
Democratic primary results
Party	Candidate	Votes	%
Democratic	Chris Carney (incumbent)	38,928	100.00
Total votes		38,928	100.00

=== Republican primary ===
==== Nominee ====
- Tom Marino, former United States Attorney for the Middle District of Pennsylvania

==== Eliminated in primary ====
- Malcolm Derk
- David Madeira

==== Primary results ====
Republican primary results
Party	Candidate	Votes	%
Republican	Tom Marino	24,435	40.96
Republican	David Madeira	18,524	31.06
Republican	Malcolm Derk	16,690	27.98
Total votes		59,649	100.00

=== Predictions ===
Source	Ranking	As of
The Cook Political Report	Tossup	November 1, 2010
Rothenberg	Tossup	November 1, 2010
Sabato's Crystal Ball	Lean R (flip)	November 1, 2010
RCP	Lean R (flip)	November 1, 2010
CQ Politics	Tossup	October 28, 2010
New York Times	Tossup	November 1, 2010
FiveThirtyEight	Likely R (flip)	November 1, 2010

=== General election ===
Pennsylvania's 10th congressional district election, 2010
Party	Candidate	Votes	%
Republican	Tom Marino	110,599	55.18
Democratic	Chris Carney (incumbent)	89,846	44.82
Total votes		200,445	100.00

== District 11 ==
2010 Pennsylvania's 11th congressional district election
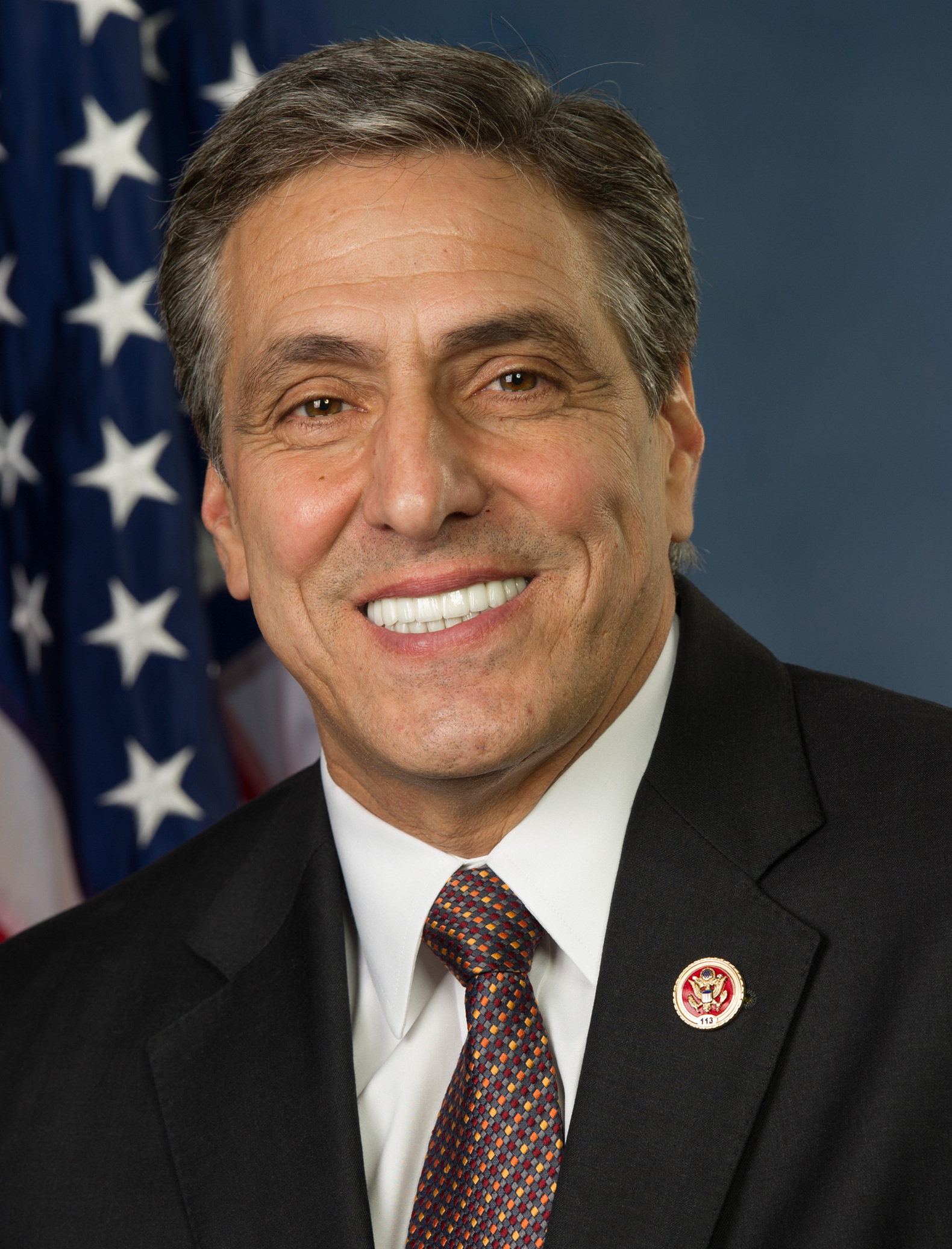

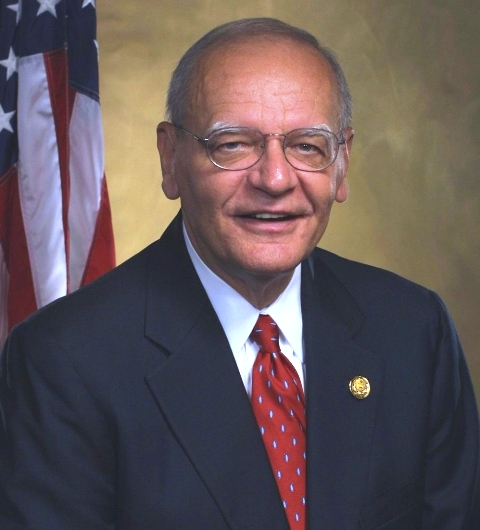
Nominee	Lou Barletta	Paul Kanjorski
Party	Republican	Democratic
Popular vote	102,179	84,618
Percentage	54.70%	45.30%
- County results Barletta: 50–60% 60–70% Kanjorski: 50–60%
U.S. representative before election
Paul Kanjorski
Democratic
Elected U.S. representative
Lou Barletta
Republican

Democratic incumbent Paul E. Kanjorski unsuccessfully ran for re-election, losing to Republican Hazleton Mayor Lou Barletta. In 2008, Obama carried this district with 57% of the vote.

Kanjorski faced Corey O'Brien and Brian Kelly in the May 2010 Democratic primary, and won with 49.3% of the primary vote.

- PA - District 11 from OurCampaigns.com
- Race ranking and details from CQ Politics
- Campaign contributions from OpenSecrets

=== Democratic primary ===
==== Nominee ====
- Paul Kanjorski, incumbent U.S. Representative

==== Eliminated in primary ====
- Brian Kelly
- Corey O'Brien, member of the Lackawanna County Board of Commissioners

==== Primary results ====
Democratic primary results
Party	Candidate	Votes	%
Democratic	Paul Kanjorski (incumbent)	33,900	49.36
Democratic	Corey O'Brien	23,267	33.87
Democratic	Brian Kelly	11,519	16.77
Total votes		68,686	100.00

=== Republican primary ===
==== Nominee ====
- Lou Barletta, mayor of Hazleton

==== Primary results ====
Republican primary results
Party	Candidate	Votes	%
Republican	Lou Barletta	28,397	100.00
Total votes		28,397	100.00

=== Predictions ===
Source	Ranking	As of
The Cook Political Report	Tossup	November 1, 2010
Rothenberg	Tilt R (flip)	November 1, 2010
Sabato's Crystal Ball	Lean R (flip)	November 1, 2010
RCP	Tossup	November 1, 2010
CQ Politics	Lean R (flip)	October 28, 2010
New York Times	Lean R (flip)	November 1, 2010
FiveThirtyEight	Tossup	November 1, 2010

=== General election ===
Pennsylvania's 11th congressional district election, 2010
Party	Candidate	Votes	%
Republican	Lou Barletta	102,179	54.70
Democratic	Paul Kanjorski (incumbent)	84,618	45.30
Total votes		186,797	100.00

== District 12 ==
2010 Pennsylvania's 12th congressional district election
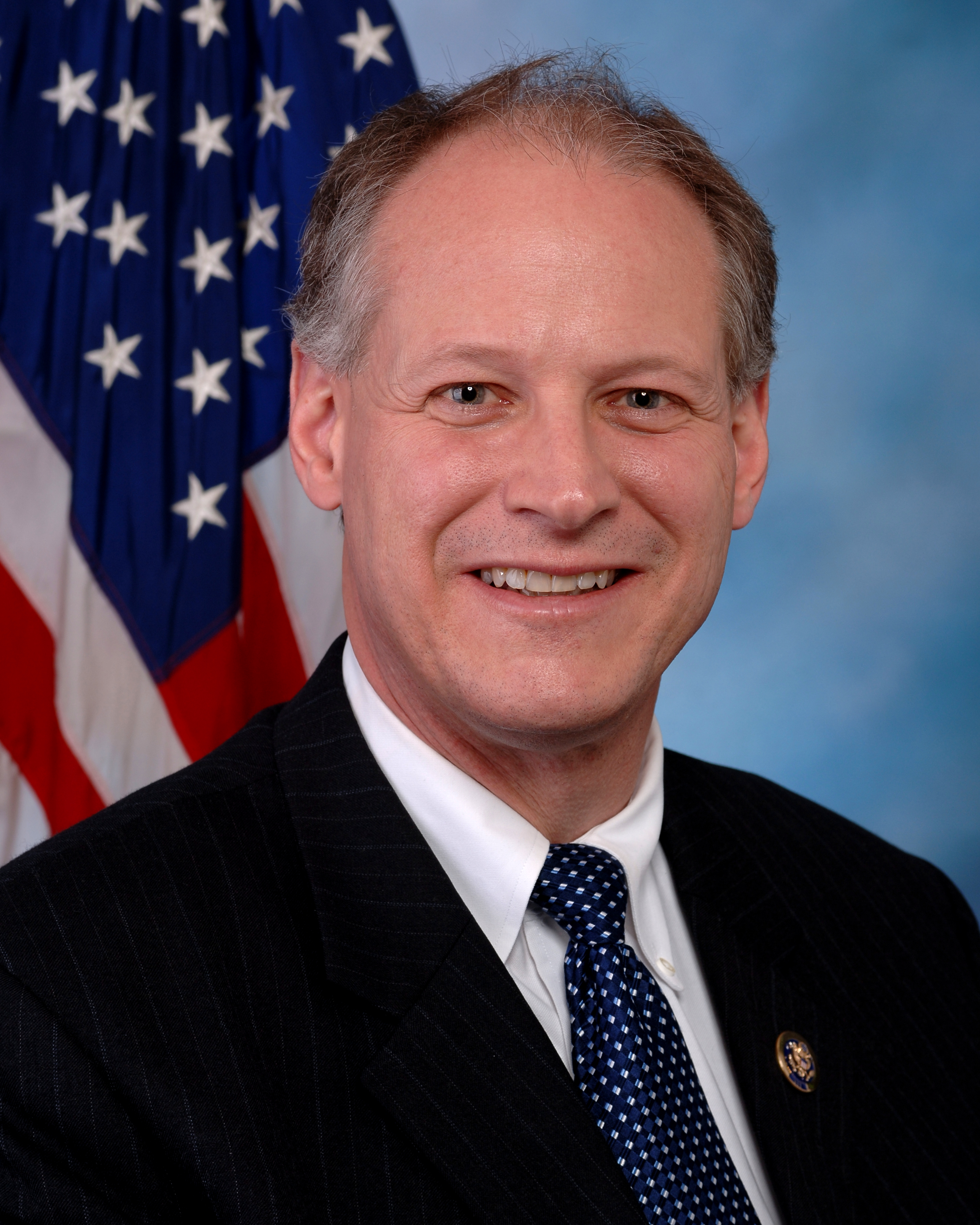

Nominee	Mark Critz	Tim Burns
Party	Democratic	Republican
Popular vote	94,056	91,170
Percentage	50.78%	49.22%
- County results Critz: 50–60% Burns: 50–60%
U.S. representative before election
Mark Critz
Democratic
Elected U.S. representative
Mark Critz
Democratic

Democrat Mark Critz won a May 2010 special election to replace John Murtha, who served the district for 36 years. He faced Republican businessman Tim Burns. Critz again defeated Burns in the regularly scheduled November general election. In 2008, McCain carried this district with 49% of the vote.

- PA - District 12 from OurCampaigns.com
- Race ranking and details from CQ Politics
- Campaign contributions from OpenSecrets
- Pennsylvania 12th District Candidates debate on C-SPAN, May 5, 2010 (1:00:00)

=== Special election ===
Pennsylvania's 12th congressional district special election, 2010
Party	Candidate	Votes	%
Democratic	Mark Critz	72,218	52.64
Republican	Tim Burns	61,722	44.99
Libertarian	Demo Agoris	3,249	2.37
Total votes		137,189	100.00

=== Democratic primary ===
==== Nominee ====
- Mark Critz, incumbent U.S. Representative

==== Eliminated in primary ====
- Ryan Bucchianeri, United States Navy veteran
- Ronald Mackell, United States Air Force veteran

==== Primary results ====
Democratic primary results
Party	Candidate	Votes	%
Democratic	Mark Critz (incumbent)	58,817	71.46
Democratic	Ryan Bucchianeri	16,965	20.61
Democratic	Ronald Mackell	6,525	7.93
Total votes		82,307	100.00

=== Republican primary ===
==== Nominee ====
- Tim Burns, businessman and Republican nominee in the special election

==== Eliminated in primary ====
- William Russell, 2008 Republican nominee

==== Primary results ====
Republican primary results
Party	Candidate	Votes	%
Republican	Tim Burns	26,577	56.96
Republican	William Russell	20,078	43.04
Total votes		46,655	100.00

==== Predictions ====
Source	Ranking	As of
The Cook Political Report	Lean D	November 1, 2010
Rothenberg	Tossup	November 1, 2010
Sabato's Crystal Ball	Lean D	November 1, 2010
RCP	Tossup	November 1, 2010
CQ Politics	Lean D	October 28, 2010
New York Times	Lean D	November 1, 2010
FiveThirtyEight	Lean D	November 1, 2010

=== General election ===
Pennsylvania's 12th congressional district election, 2010
Party	Candidate	Votes	%
Democratic	Mark Critz (incumbent)	94,056	50.78
Republican	Tim Burns	91,170	49.22
Total votes		185,226	100.00

== District 13 ==
2010 Pennsylvania's 13th congressional district election
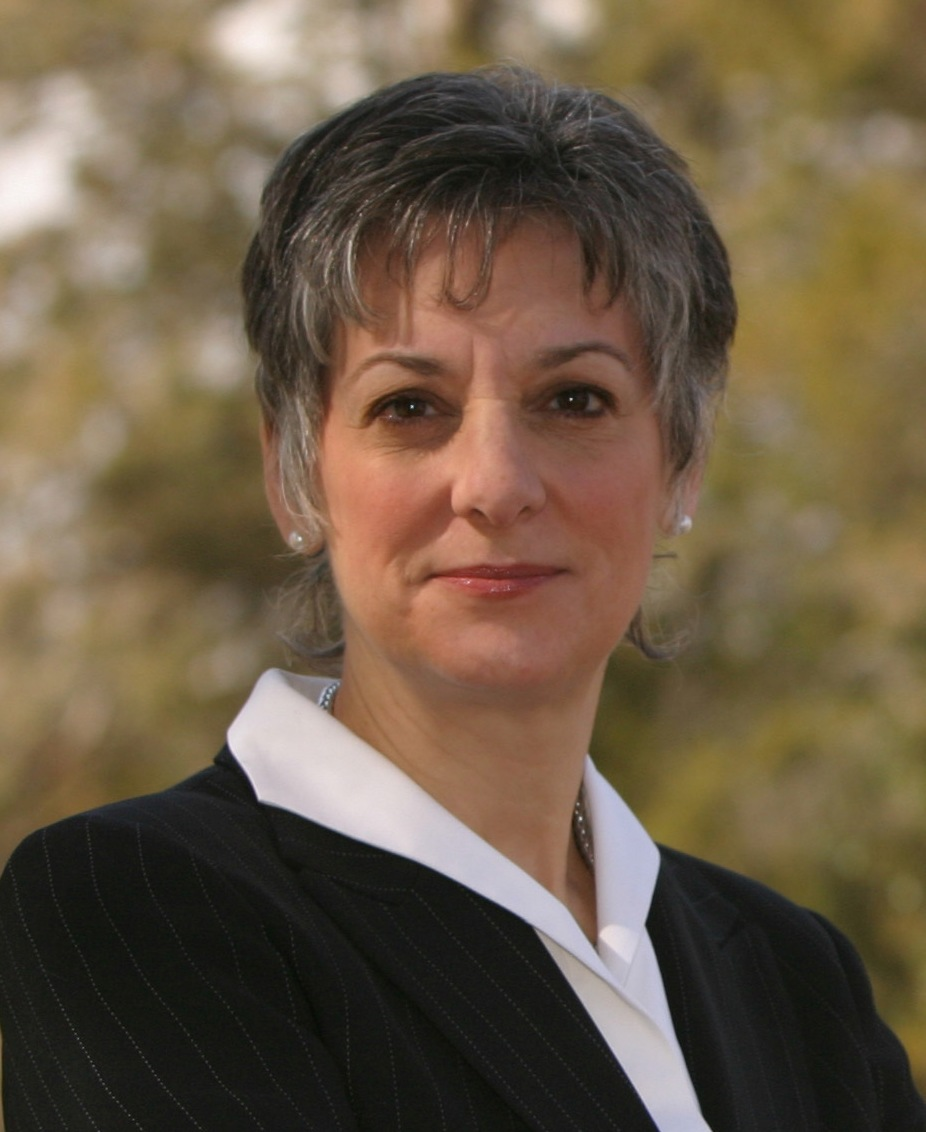

Nominee	Allyson Schwartz	Dee Adcock
Party	Democratic	Republican
Popular vote	118,710	91,987
Percentage	56.34%	43.66%
- County results Schwartz: 50–60% 60–70%
U.S. representative before election
Allyson Schwartz
Democratic
Elected U.S. representative
Allyson Schwartz
Democratic

Democratic incumbent Allyson Schwartz successfully ran for re-election. She defeated Republican Dee Adcock. Obama carried this district with 59% of the vote.

- PA - District 13 from OurCampaigns.com
- Race ranking and details from CQ Politics
- Campaign contributions from OpenSecrets

=== Democratic primary ===
==== Nominee ====
- Allyson Schwartz, incumbent U.S. Representative

==== Primary results ====
Democratic primary results
Party	Candidate	Votes	%
Democratic	Allyson Schwartz (incumbent)	44,402	100.00
Total votes		44,402	100.00

=== Republican primary ===
==== Nominee ====
- Dee Adcock

==== Eliminated in primary ====
- Brian Haughton
- Joshua Quinter

==== Primary results ====
Republican primary results
Party	Candidate	Votes	%
Republican	Dee Adcock	14,416	47.98
Republican	Joshua Quinter	8,334	27.74
Republican	Brian Haughton	7,293	24.28
Total votes		30,043	100.00

=== Predictions ===
Source	Ranking	As of
The Cook Political Report	Safe D	November 1, 2010
Rothenberg	Safe D	November 1, 2010
Sabato's Crystal Ball	Safe D	November 1, 2010
RCP	Likely D	November 1, 2010
CQ Politics	Safe D	October 28, 2010
New York Times	Safe D	November 1, 2010
FiveThirtyEight	Safe D	November 1, 2010

=== General election ===
Pennsylvania's 13th congressional district election, 2010
Party	Candidate	Votes	%
Democratic	Allyson Schwartz (incumbent)	118,710	56.34
Republican	Dee Adcock	91,987	43.66
Total votes		210,697	100.00

== District 14 ==
2010 Pennsylvania's 14th congressional district election
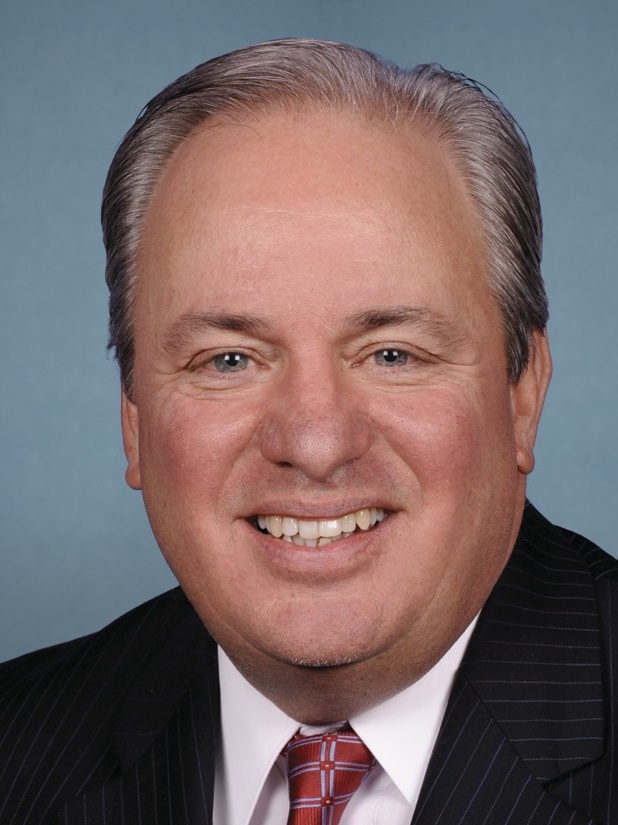

Nominee	Mike Doyle	Melissa Haluszczak
Party	Democratic	Republican
Popular vote	122,073	49,997
Percentage	68.8%	28.2%
- County results Doyle: 60–70%
U.S. representative before election
Mike Doyle
Democratic
Elected U.S. representative
Mike Doyle
Democratic

Democratic incumbent Mike Doyle successfully ran for re-election. He defeated Republican Melissa Haluszczak and Green Party nominee Ed Bortz. In 2008, Doyle received 91% of the vote and Obama carried this district with 70% of the vote.

- PA - District 14 from OurCampaigns.com
- Race ranking and details from CQ Politics
- Campaign contributions from OpenSecrets

=== Democratic primary ===
==== Nominee ====
- Mike Doyle, incumbent U.S. Representative

==== Primary results ====
Democratic primary results
Party	Candidate	Votes	%
Democratic	Mike Doyle (incumbent)	71,511	100.00
Total votes		71,511	100.00

=== Republican primary ===
==== Nominee ====
- Melissa Haluszczak

==== Primary results ====
Republican primary results
Party	Candidate	Votes	%
Republican	Melissa Haluszczak	11,585	100.00
Total votes		11,585	100.00

=== Predictions ===
Source	Ranking	As of
The Cook Political Report	Safe D	November 1, 2010
Rothenberg	Safe D	November 1, 2010
Sabato's Crystal Ball	Safe D	November 1, 2010
RCP	Safe D	November 1, 2010
CQ Politics	Safe D	October 28, 2010
New York Times	Safe D	November 1, 2010
FiveThirtyEight	Safe D	November 1, 2010

=== General election ===
Pennsylvania's 14th congressional district election, 2010
Party	Candidate	Votes	%
Democratic	Mike Doyle (incumbent)	122,073	68.79
Republican	Melissa Haluszczak	49,997	28.17
Green	Ed Bortz	5,400	3.04
Total votes		177,470	100.00

== District 15 ==
2010 Pennsylvania's 15th congressional district election
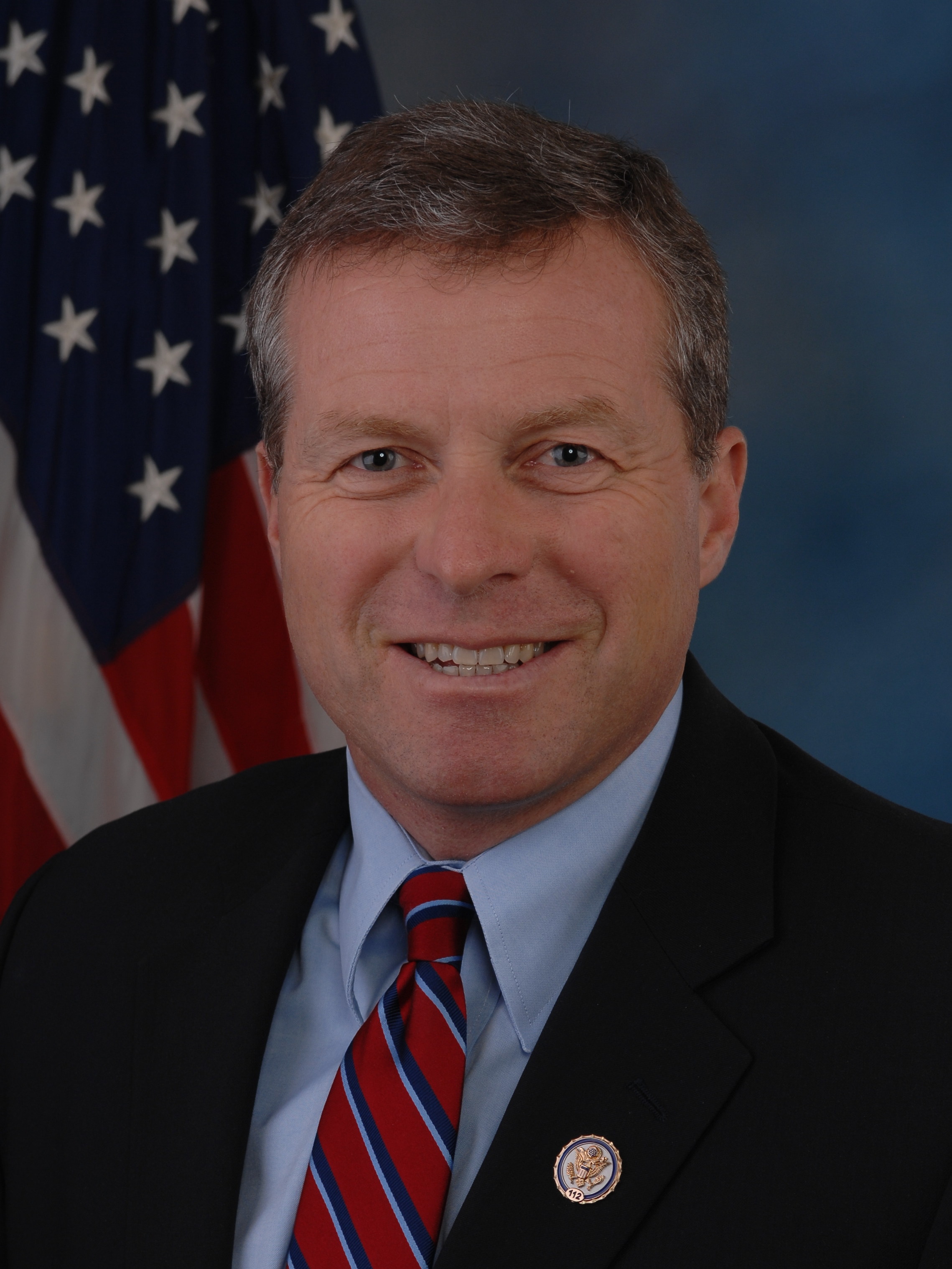

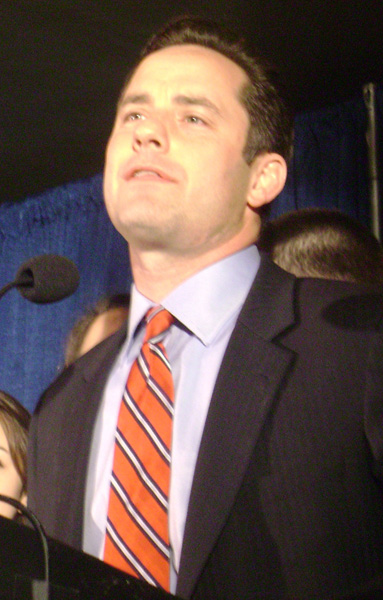

Nominee	Charlie Dent	John B. Callahan	Jake Towne
Party	Republican	Democratic	Independent
Popular vote	109,534	79,766	15,248
Percentage	53.55%	39.00%	7.45%
- County results Dent: 50–60% 60–70%
U.S. Representative before election
Charlie Dent
Republican
Elected U.S. Representative
Charlie Dent
Republican

Republican incumbent Charlie Dent successfully ran for re-election. He defeated Democrat Bethlehem Mayor John B. Callahan and Independent Jake Towne. In 2008, Obama carried this district with 56% of the vote.

- PA - District 15 from OurCampaigns.com
- Race ranking and details from CQ Politics
- Campaign contributions from OpenSecrets

=== Democratic primary ===
==== Nominee ====
- John B. Callahan, mayor of Bethlehem

==== Primary results ====
Democratic primary results
Party	Candidate	Votes	%
Democratic	John B. Callahan	32,825	100.00
Total votes		32,825	100.00

=== Republican primary ===
==== Nominee ====
- Charlie Dent, incumbent U.S. Representative

==== Eliminated in primary ====
- Mat Benol

==== Primary results ====
Republican primary results
Party	Candidate	Votes	%
Republican	Charlie Dent (incumbent)	31,618	82.92
Republican	Mat Benol	6,514	17.08
Total votes		38,132	100.00

=== Polling ===
Poll source	Date(s) administered	Sample size	Margin of error	John Callahan (D)	Charlie Dent (R)	Jake Towne (I)	Undecided
Morning Call/Muhlenberg	September 11–15, 2010	496	± 5.0%	38%	49%	3%	10%

=== Predictions ===
Source	Ranking	As of
The Cook Political Report	Likely R	November 1, 2010
Rothenberg	Likely R	November 1, 2010
Sabato's Crystal Ball	Lean R	November 1, 2010
RCP	Likely R	November 1, 2010
CQ Politics	Lean R	October 28, 2010
New York Times	Lean R	November 1, 2010
FiveThirtyEight	Safe R	November 1, 2010

=== General election ===
Pennsylvania's 15th congressional district election, 2010
Party	Candidate	Votes	%
Republican	Charlie Dent (incumbent)	109,534	53.55
Democratic	John B. Callahan	79,766	39.00
Independent	Jake Towne	15,248	7.45
Total votes		204,548	100.00

== District 16 ==
2010 Pennsylvania's 16th congressional district election
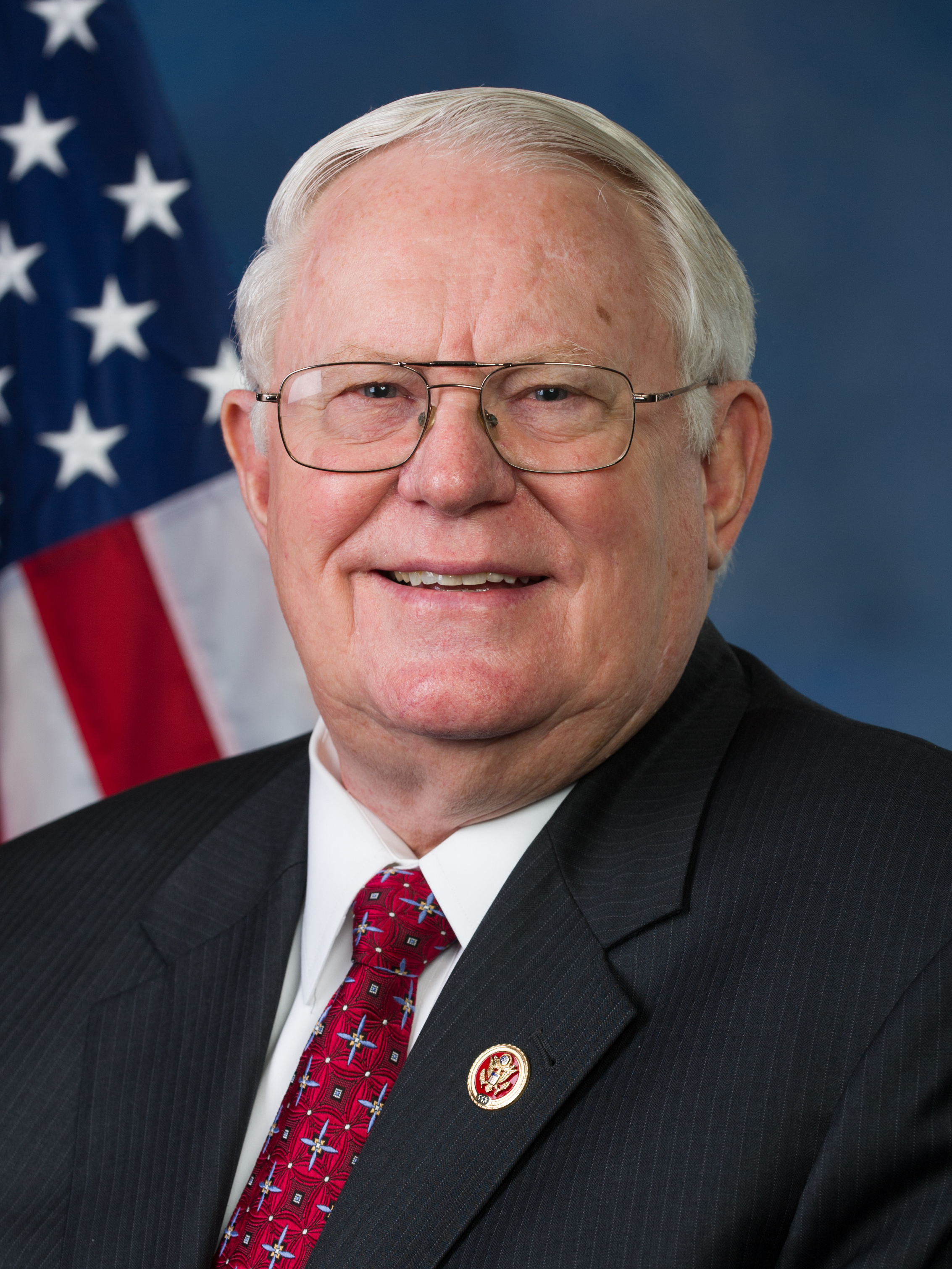

Nominee	Joe Pitts	Lois Herr
Party	Republican	Democratic
Popular vote	134,113	70,994
Percentage	65.39%	34.61%
- County results Pitts: 50–60% 60–70% Herr: 50–60%
U.S. representative before election
Joe Pitts
Republican
Elected U.S. representative
Joe Pitts
Republican

Republican incumbent Joe Pitts successfully ran for re-election. He again defeated Democratic nominee Lois Herr. In 2008, McCain carried the district with 51% of the vote.

- PA - District 16 from OurCampaigns.com
- Race ranking and details from CQ Politics
- Campaign contributions from OpenSecrets

=== Democratic primary ===
==== Nominee ====
- Lois Herr, political activist

==== Primary results ====
Democratic primary results
Party	Candidate	Votes	%
Democratic	Lois Herr	24,541	100.00
Total votes		24,541	100.00

=== Republican primary ===
==== Nominee ====
- Joe Pitts, incumbent U.S. Representative

==== Primary results ====
Republican primary results
Party	Candidate	Votes	%
Republican	Joe Pitts (incumbent)	50,629	100.00
Total votes		50,629	100.00

=== Predictions ===
Source	Ranking	As of
The Cook Political Report	Safe R	November 1, 2010
Rothenberg	Safe R	November 1, 2010
Sabato's Crystal Ball	Safe R	November 1, 2010
RCP	Safe R	November 1, 2010
CQ Politics	Safe R	October 28, 2010
New York Times	Safe R	November 1, 2010
FiveThirtyEight	Safe R	November 1, 2010

=== General election ===
Pennsylvania's 16th congressional district election, 2010
Party	Candidate	Votes	%
Republican	Joe Pitts (incumbent)	134,113	65.39
Democratic	Lois Herr	70,994	34.61
Total votes		205,107	100.00

== District 17 ==
2010 Pennsylvania's 17th congressional district election
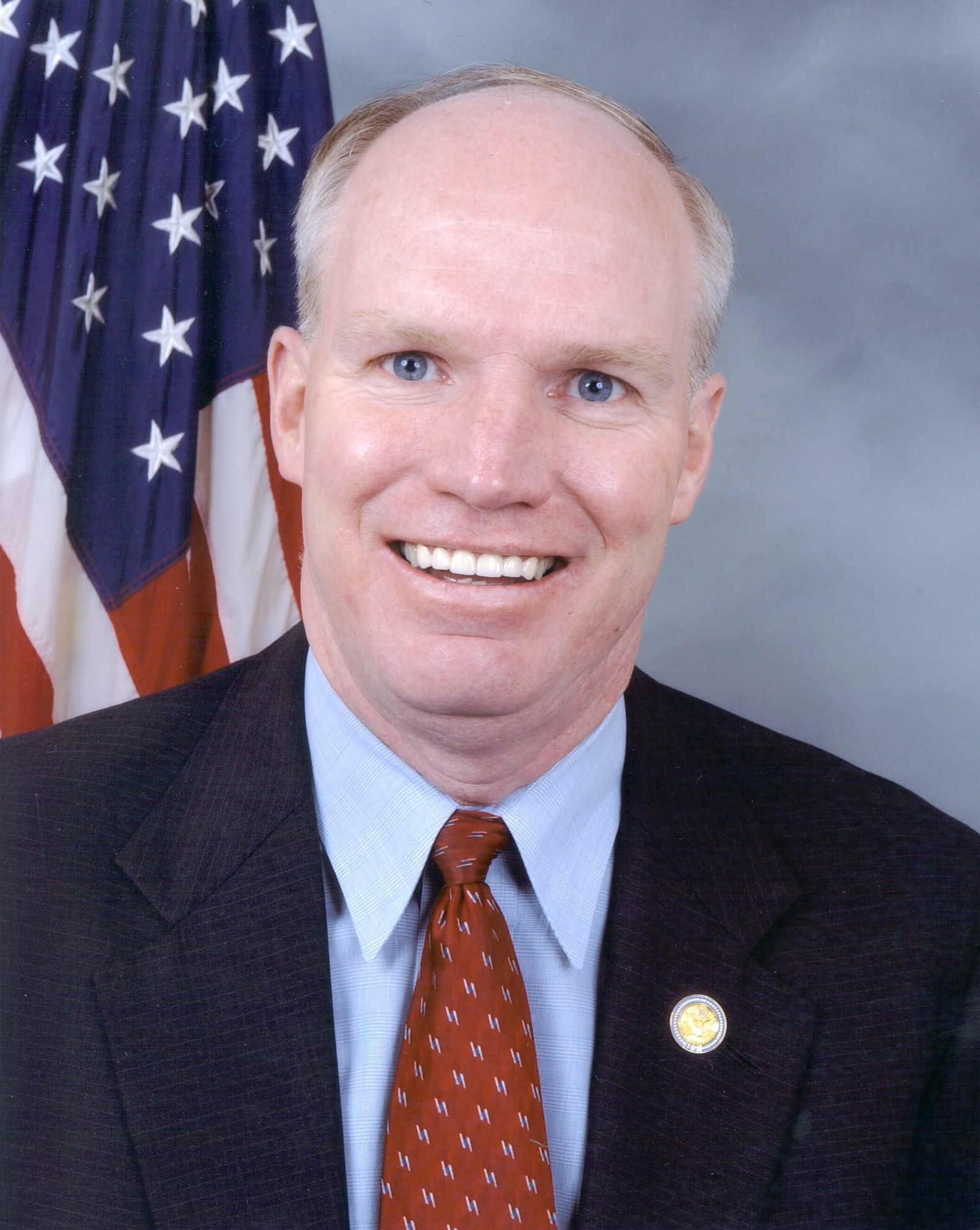

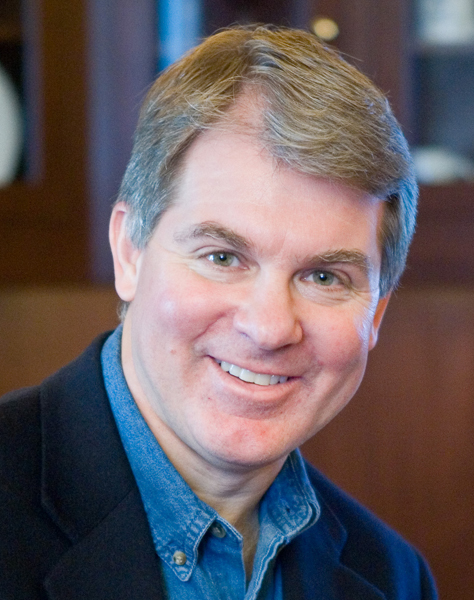
Nominee	Tim Holden	Dave Argall
Party	Democratic	Republican
Popular vote	118,486	95,000
Percentage	55.50%	44.50%
- County results Holden: 50–60% 60–70% Argall: 50–60%
U.S. representative before election
Tim Holden
Democratic
Elected U.S. representative
Tim Holden
Democratic

Democratic incumbent Tim Holden successfully ran for re-election. He defeated Republican State Senator Dave Argall. In 2008, McCain carried this district with 51% of the vote.

- PA - District 17 from OurCampaigns.com
- Race ranking and details from CQ Politics
- Campaign contributions from OpenSecrets

=== Democratic primary ===
==== Nominee ====
- Tim Holden, incumbent U.S. Representative

==== Eliminated in primary ====
- Sheila Dow-Ford

==== Primary results ====
Democratic primary results
Party	Candidate	Votes	%
Democratic	Tim Holden (incumbent)	30,630	65.27
Democratic	Sheila Dow-Ford	16,296	34.73
Total votes		46,926	100.00

=== Republican primary ===
==== Nominee ====
- Dave Argall, member of the Pennsylvania State Senate

==== Eliminated in primary ====
- Josh First
- Allen Griffith
- Frank Ryan

==== Primary results ====
Republican primary results
Party	Candidate	Votes	%
Republican	Dave Argall	20,712	32.33
Republican	Frank Ryan	19,890	31.05
Republican	Josh First	14,955	23.35
Republican	Allen Griffith	8,503	13.27
Total votes		64,060	100.00

=== Predictions ===
Source	Ranking	As of
The Cook Political Report	Likely D	November 1, 2010
Rothenberg	Safe D	November 1, 2010
Sabato's Crystal Ball	Likely D	November 1, 2010
RCP	Likely D	November 1, 2010
CQ Politics	Likely D	October 28, 2010
New York Times	Lean D	November 1, 2010
FiveThirtyEight	Safe D	November 1, 2010

=== General election ===
Pennsylvania's 17th congressional district election, 2010
Party	Candidate	Votes	%
Democratic	Tim Holden (incumbent)	118,486	55.50
Republican	Dave Argall	95,000	44.50
Total votes		213,486	100.00

== District 18 ==
2010 Pennsylvania's 18th congressional district election
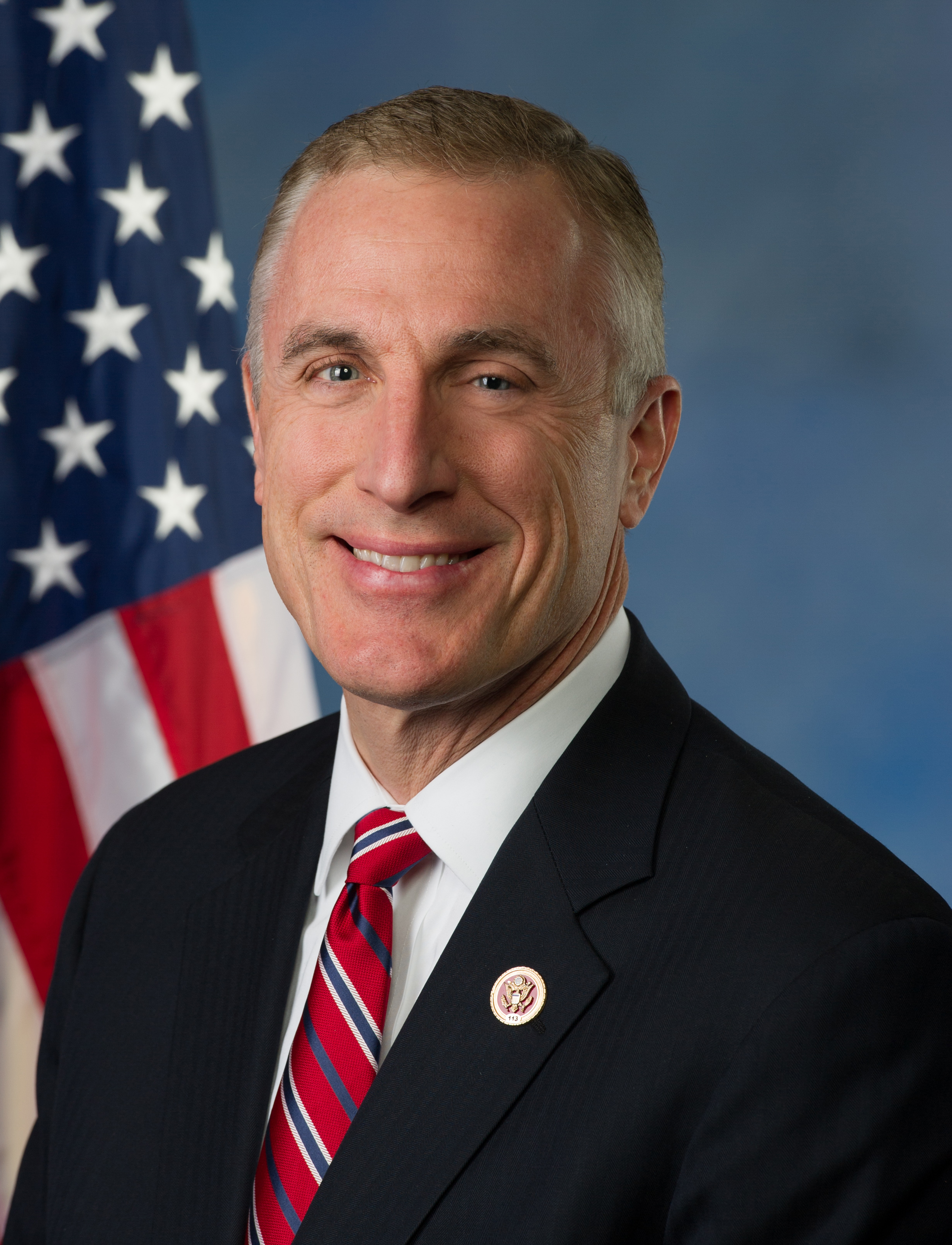

Nominee	Tim Murphy	Dan Connolly
Party	Republican	Democratic
Popular vote	161,888	78,558
Percentage	67.33%	32.67%
- County results Murphy: 60–70% 70–80%
U.S. representative before election
Tim Murphy
Republican
Elected U.S. representative
Tim Murphy
Republican

Republican incumbent Tim Murphy successfully ran for re-election. He defeated Democrat Dan Connolly. In 2008, McCain carried this district with 55% of the vote.

- PA - District 18 from OurCampaigns.com
- Race ranking and details from CQ Politics
- Campaign contributions from OpenSecrets

=== Democratic primary ===
==== Nominee ====
- Dan Connolly

==== Primary results ====
Democratic primary results
Party	Candidate	Votes	%
Democratic	Dan Connolly	58,081	100.00
Total votes		58,081	100.00

=== Republican primary ===
==== Nominee ====
- Tim Murphy, incumbent U.S. Representative

==== Primary results ====
Republican primary results
Party	Candidate	Votes	%
Republican	Tim Murphy (incumbent)	47,785	100.00
Total votes		47,785	100.00

=== Predictions ===
Source	Ranking	As of
The Cook Political Report	Safe R	November 1, 2010
Rothenberg	Safe R	November 1, 2010
Sabato's Crystal Ball	Safe R	November 1, 2010
RCP	Safe R	November 1, 2010
CQ Politics	Safe R	October 28, 2010
New York Times	Safe R	November 1, 2010
FiveThirtyEight	Safe R	November 1, 2010

=== General election ===
Pennsylvania's 18th congressional district election, 2010
Party	Candidate	Votes	%
Republican	Tim Murphy (incumbent)	161,888	67.33
Democratic	Dan Connolly	78,558	32.67
Total votes		240,446	100.00

== District 19 ==
2010 Pennsylvania's 19th congressional district election
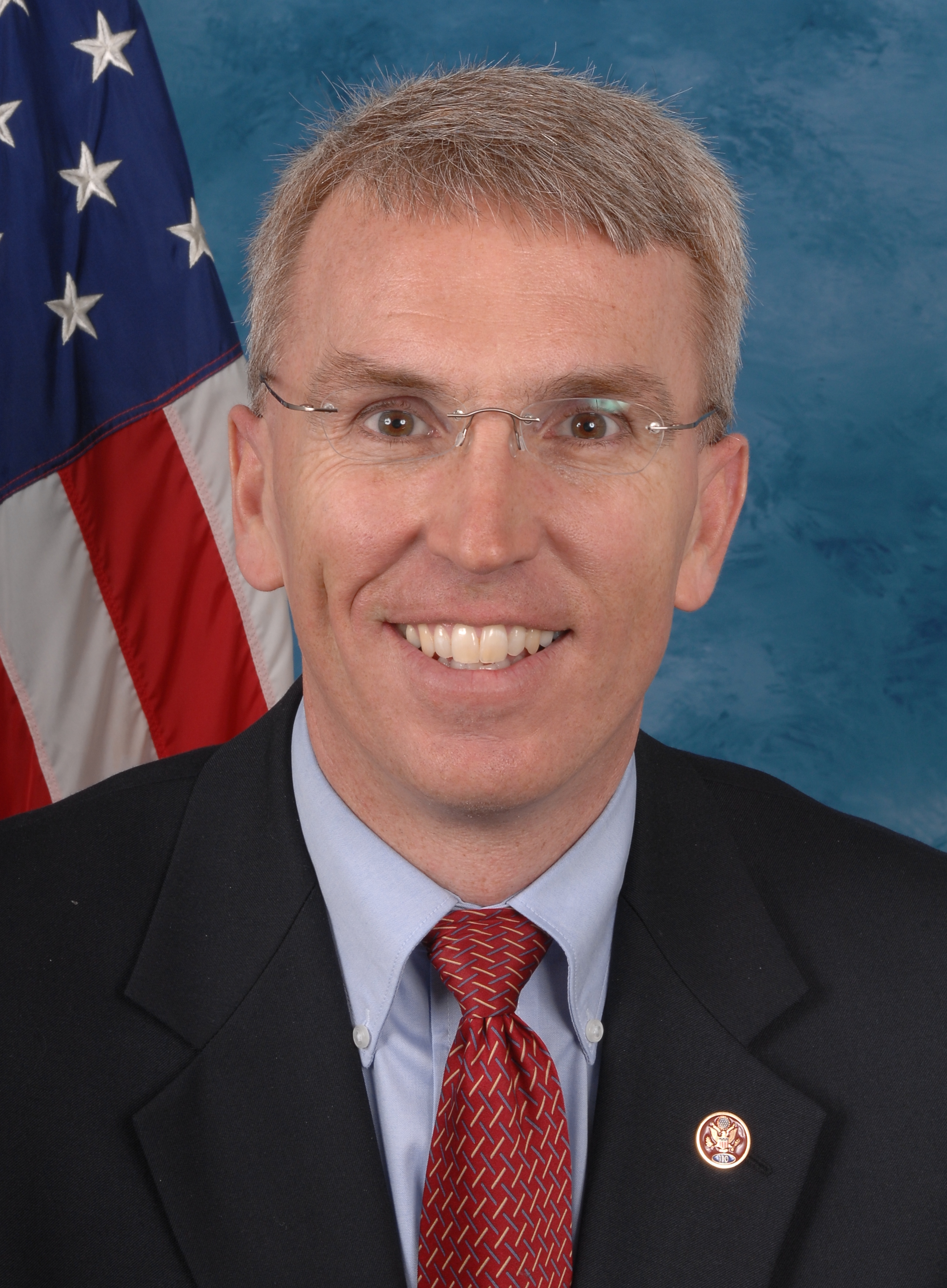

Nominee	Todd Platts	Ryan Sanders
Party	Republican	Democratic
Popular vote	165,219	53,549
Percentage	71.91%	23.31%
- County results Platts: 70–80%
U.S. representative before election
Todd Platts
Republican
Elected U.S. representative
Todd Platts
Republican

Republican incumbent Todd Platts successfully ran for re-election. He defeated Democrat Ryan Sanders and Independence Party nominee Joshua Monighan. In 2008, McCain carried this district with 56% of the vote.

- PA - District 19 from OurCampaigns.com
- Race ranking and details from CQ Politics
- Campaign contributions from OpenSecrets

=== Democratic primary ===
==== Nominee ====
- Ryan Sanders

==== Primary results ====
Democratic primary results
Party	Candidate	Votes	%
Democratic	Ryan Sanders	33,283	100.00
Total votes		33,283	100.00

=== Republican primary ===
==== Nominee ====
- Todd Platts, incumbent U.S. Representative

==== Eliminated in primary ====
- Michael Smeltzer

==== Primary results ====
Republican primary results
Party	Candidate	Votes	%
Republican	Todd Platts (incumbent)	51,792	69.99
Republican	Michael Smeltzer	22,210	30.01
Total votes		74,002	100.00

=== Predictions ===
Source	Ranking	As of
The Cook Political Report	Safe R	November 1, 2010
Rothenberg	Safe R	November 1, 2010
Sabato's Crystal Ball	Safe R	November 1, 2010
RCP	Safe R	November 1, 2010
CQ Politics	Safe R	October 28, 2010
New York Times	Safe R	November 1, 2010
FiveThirtyEight	Safe R	November 1, 2010

=== General election ===
Pennsylvania's 19th congressional district election, 2010
Party	Candidate	Votes	%
Republican	Todd Platts (incumbent)	165,219	71.91
Democratic	Ryan Sanders	53,549	23.31
Independence Party of America	Joshua Monighan	10,988	4.78
Total votes		229,756	100.00
