= Edward Staback =

American politician (1937–2022)

Member of the Pennsylvania House of Representatives from the 115th district
- In office January 1, 1985 – November 30, 2012
- Preceded by: Joseph G. Wargo
- Succeeded by: Frank Farina

Member of the Lackawanna County Board of Commissioners
- In office March 13, 2015 – January 2016
- Preceded by: Corey O'Brien
- Succeeded by: Jerry Notarianni

Personal details
- Born: July 2, 1937 Olyphant, Pennsylvania, U.S.
- Died: November 19, 2022 (aged 85) Nebraska, U.S.
- Party: Democratic
- Spouse: Angeline "Angie" Berardi
- Children: 3
- Education: King's College (BA)
- Alma mater: Saint Patrick's High School

Edward G. Staback (July 2, 1937 – November 19, 2022) was an American politician who served as a member of the Pennsylvania House of Representatives, representing the 115th District from 1985 to 2012. A Democrat, Staback also served on the Lackawanna County Board of Commissioners in 2015.

== Biography ==
Staback was born on July 2, 1937, in Olyphant, Pennsylvania, the son of Irene (née Zipay) and Adolph Staback. He graduated from Saint Patrick's High School in 1955 and earned a Bachelor of Arts degree in business economics from King's College in 1959.

== Political Involvement ==
Staback was first elected to represent the 115th District in the Pennsylvania House of Representatives in 1984. He served a total of fourteen terms in the House before retiring in 2012. As a representative, Staback promoted the right's of outdoorsmen, voicing support for legalized hunting on Sundays, raising penalties on illegal hunters, and expanding game lands. He also worked to aid in the reclamation of abandoned mine land. The Ed Staback Memorial Park in Archbald, Pennsylvania is named in his honor.

In 2015, Staback was chosen to fill a vacancy on the Lackawanna County Board of Commissioners left by the resignation of Corey O'Brien. He was sworn in on March 13, 2015. He chose not to seek re-election in November and his term expired in January 2016.

== Personal life and death ==
Staback died on November 19, 2022 at the age of 85 while on a hunting trip in Nebraska with his son.
