= Joseph G. Wargo =

American politician

Member of the Pennsylvania House of Representatives from the 115th district
- In office 1969–1984
- Preceded by: District created
- Succeeded by: Edward Staback

Member of the Pennsylvania House of Representatives from the Lackawanna County district
- In office 1949–1968

Personal details
- Born: August 4, 1922 Olyphant, Pennsylvania
- Died: August 21, 1999 (aged 77) Olyphant, Pennsylvania
- Party: Democratic

Joseph G. Wargo (August 4, 1922 – August 21, 1999) was a Democratic member of the Pennsylvania House of Representatives.
