= Corey O'Brien =

American politician

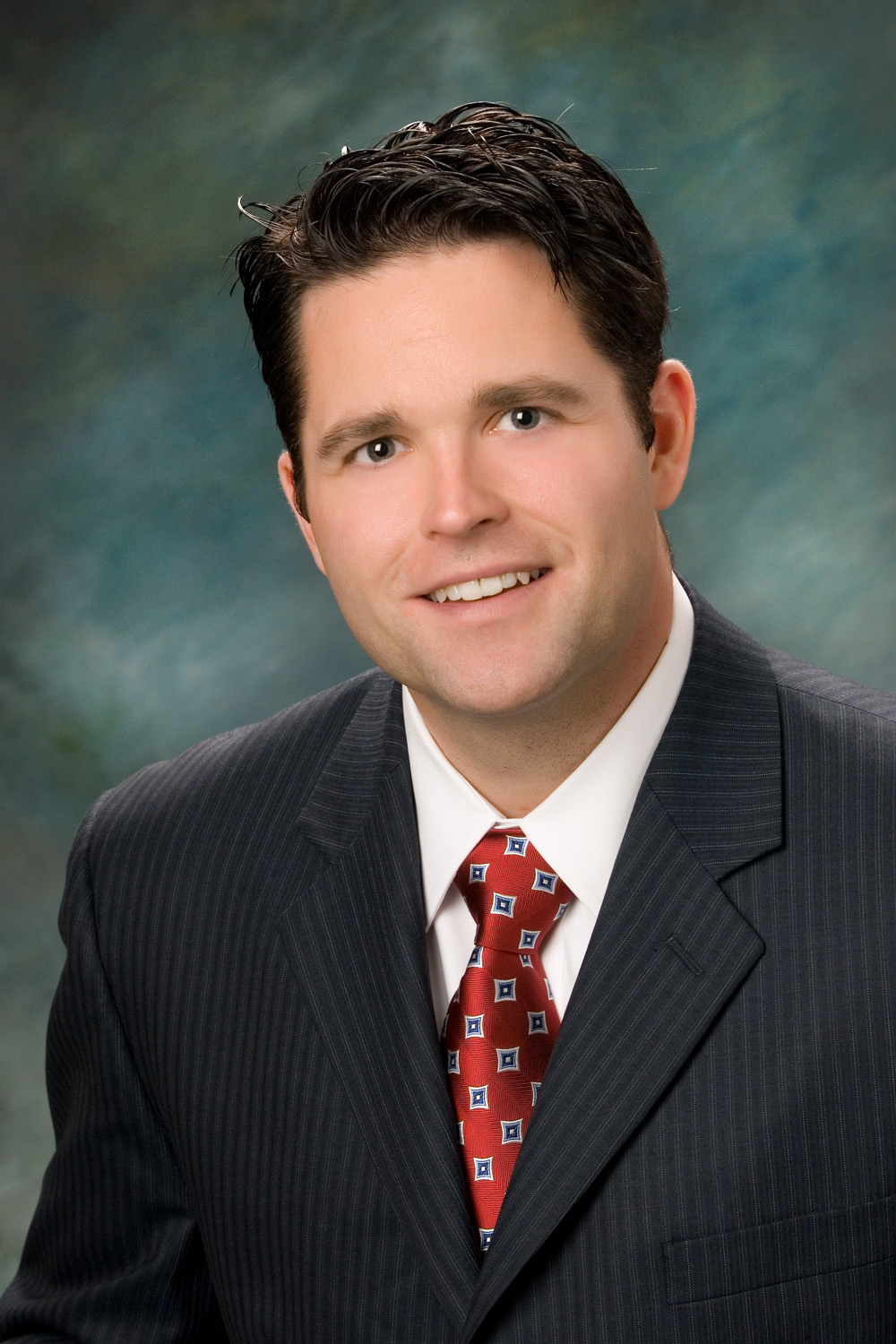

Member of the Lackawanna County Board of Commissioners
- In office January 7, 2008 – February 15, 2015
- Preceded by: Robert Cordaro
- Succeeded by: Edward Staback

Personal details
- Born: Corey Daniel O'Brien; September 11, 1973 (age 52) Dunmore, Pennsylvania
- Spouse: Elisa DePolo O’Brien Michelle R. O'Brien (divorced)
- Children: 4
- Education: Pennsylvania State University (B.A.); Catholic University of America (J.D.)

Corey Daniel O’Brien (born September 11, 1973) is an American lawyer and politician. He was a member of the Lackawanna County Board of Commissioners from 2008 to 2015. In 2010, he challenged incumbent Congressman Paul Kanjorski in the May 2010 Democratic primary but lost.

== Early life and education ==
He graduated from the Dunmore Junior-Senior High School in Dunmore, Pennsylvania, in 1992.

He graduated from Penn State University with a Bachelor of Arts in 1996 and from the Catholic University of America Columbus School of Law with a Juris Doctor in 2000.

== Early career ==
In 1996 he interned in the White House during the Presidency of Bill Clinton. From 1996 to 1997 he was a press officer with the United States Agency for International Development.

From 1992 to 1997 he served as President of the Dunmore Community Center Development Board in Dunmore, Pennsylvania.

== Legal & broadcasting career ==
From 2000 to 2005 and again from 2007 to 2008 he practiced law with Kilpatrick Townsend & Stockton in Washington, D.C.

From 2005 to 2006 he hosted The Pulse with Corey O'Brien on WOLF-TV in Northeastern Pennsylvania. In 2006 he hosted Corey O’Brien Now on WILK News Radio in Northeastern Pennsylvania.

From 2005 to 2007 he served as Of Counsel for Stevens & Lee in Scranton, Pennsylvania.

From 2012 to 2015 he practiced law with his own law firm in Moosic, Pennsylvania.

He later served as a political analyst on the ABC-affiliate, WNEP-TV 16, and WILK News Radio.

== Political career ==
In 2008 he served as a member of the Obama for America Pennsylvania Statewide Leadership Council and later an elector for the 56th Electoral College of Pennsylvania. From 2008 to 2015 he served as a member of the Lackawanna County Board of Commissioners.

=== 2007 Commissioner election ===
In 2007, O'Brien and incumbent Democratic Commissioner Mike Washo took on the two incumbent majority commissioners, Republicans, A.J. Munchak and Robert Cordaro. In November, the Washo-O'Brien ticket defeated the Republican ticket, with only Munchak remaining on the board.

=== 2010 Congressional election ===
He challenged 13-term incumbent Congressman Paul Kanjorski in the May 2010 Democratic primary. O'Brien received 33.9% of the vote, while Brian Kelly received 16.8% of the vote, and Kanjorski won with 49.3% of the vote. In the general election, Kanjorski was defeated by Republican Lou Barletta.

=== 2011 Commissioner election ===
In 2011, O'Brien selected Jeanette Mariani, the Mayor of Blakely, as his new running mate after Washo announced his retirement. In the Democratic primary, O'Brien finished with the second-highest vote total, narrowly ahead of former county chief of staff Elizabeth Randol, but behind the top vote getter, former State Representative James Wansacz. In the general election, O'Brien and Wansacz received the two highest vote totals, thus continuing the Democratic majority on the board.

== Other activities ==
From 2010 to 2014 he served as an investor, co-founder, and later managing member of Rapid Recovery in Allentown and Philadelphia.

He later joined AllOne Health Resources Corporation serving as Vice President for Business Development from 2015 to 2016 and currently Vice President & Chief Strategy Officer since 2016.

== Electoral history ==
Lackawanna County Board of Commissioners: 2007 general election
Party	Candidate	Votes	%	±%
Democratic	Mike Washo	42,609	34.68	
Democratic	Corey O'Brien	42,597	34.67	
Republican	A.J. Munchak	18,780	15.29	
Republican	Robert Cordaro	18,730	15.25	

Pennsylvania's 11th Congressional District: 2010 Democratic primary
Party	Candidate	Votes	%	±%
Democratic	Paul Kanjorski	33,783	49.3	
Democratic	Corey O'Brien	23,236	33.9	
Democratic	Brian Kelly	11,512	16.8	

Lackawanna County Board of Commissioners: 2011 general election
Party	Candidate	Votes	%	±%
Democratic	James Wansacz	25,840	29.49	
Democratic	Corey O'Brien	24,312	27.74	
Republican	Patrick O'Malley	21,460	24.49	
Republican	William Jones II	16,019	18.28	
