= 2012 United States House of Representatives elections in Pennsylvania =

- November 6, 2012

All 18 Pennsylvania seats to the United States House of Representatives
	Majority party	Minority party
Party	Republican	Democratic
Last election	12	7
Seats won	13	5
Seat change	▲1	▼2
Popular vote	2,710,070	2,793,538
Percentage	48.77%	50.28%
Swing	▼2.64%	▲2.71%

Republican hold Republican gain
Democratic hold
Republican
50–60%
60–70%
70–80%
Democratic
40–50%
50–60%
60–70%
70–80%
80–90%

The 2012 United States House of Representatives elections in Pennsylvania were held on Tuesday, November 6, 2012, to elect the 18 U.S. representatives from the state of Pennsylvania, a loss of one seat following the 2010 United States census. The elections coincided with the elections of other federal and state offices, including a quadrennial presidential election and an election to the U.S. Senate. Primary elections were held Tuesday, April 24.

Republicans control redistricting in Pennsylvania, which lost one seat in reapportionment. A map released on December 13, 2011, effectively merged the 4th and 12th congressional districts, represented by Democrats Jason Altmire and Mark Critz. The map was passed by the Pennsylvania Senate. Critz won the incumbent-on-incumbent primary, but then lost the general election.

Pennsylvania was one of five states in which the party that won the state's popular vote did not win a majority of seats in 2012, the other states being Arizona, Michigan, North Carolina, and Wisconsin.

== Overview ==
=== Statewide ===
Party	Candidates	Votes		Seats		
Party	Candidates	No.	%	No.	+/–	%
Republican	17	2,710,070	48.77	13	▲1	72.22
Democratic	17	2,793,538	50.28	5	▼2	27.78
Independent	5	46,512	0.84	0	Steady	0.0
Libertarian	1	6,210	0.11	0	Steady	0.0
Total	40	5,556,330	100.0	18	▼1	100.0

Popular vote
Democratic	50.28%
Republican	48.77%
Other	0.95%

House seats
Republican	72.22%
Democratic	27.78%

=== District ===
Results of the 2012 United States House of Representatives elections in Pennsylvania by district:

District	Democratic		Republican		Others		Total		Result
District	Votes	%	Votes	%	Votes	%	Votes	%	Result
District 1	235,394	84.95%	41,708	15.05%	0	0.00%	277,102	100.00%	Democratic hold
District 2	318,176	89.28%	33,381	9.37%	4,829	1.35%	356,386	100.00%	Democratic hold
District 3	123,933	40.97%	165,826	54.82%	12,755	4.22%	302,514	100.00%	Republican hold
District 4	104,643	34.42%	181,603	59.74%	17,734	5.83%	303,980	100.00%	Republican hold
District 5	104,725	37.08%	177,740	62.92%	0	0.00%	282,465	100.00%	Republican hold
District 6	143,803	42.86%	191,725	57.14%	0	0.00%	335,528	100.00%	Republican hold
District 7	143,509	40.60%	209,942	59.40%	0	0.00%	353,451	100.00%	Republican hold
District 8	152,859	43.40%	199,379	56.60%	0	0.00%	352,238	100.00%	Republican hold
District 9	105,128	38.33%	169,177	61.67%	0	0.00%	274,305	100.00%	Republican hold
District 10	94,227	34.42%	179,563	65.58%	0	0.00%	273,790	100.00%	Republican hold
District 11	118,231	41.46%	166,967	58.54%	0	0.00%	285,198	100.00%	Republican hold
District 12	163,589	48.26%	175,352	51.74%	0	0.00%	338,941	100.00%	Republican gain
District 13	209,901	69.09%	93,918	30.91%	0	0.00%	303,819	100.00%	Democratic hold
District 14	251,932	76.89%	75,702	23.11%	0	0.00%	327,634	100.00%	Democratic hold
District 15	128,764	43.25%	168,960	56.75%	0	0.00%	297,724	100.00%	Republican hold
District 16	111,185	39.04%	156,192	54.85%	17,404	6.11%	284,781	100.00%	Republican hold
District 17	161,393	60.31%	106,208	39.69%	0	0.00%	267,601	100.00%	Democratic hold
District 18	122,146	36.04%	216,727	63.96%	0	0.00%	338,873	100.00%	Republican hold
Total	2,793,538	50.28%	2,710,070	48.77%	52,722	0.95%	5,556,330	100.00%	

== District 1 ==
2012 Pennsylvania's 1st congressional district election
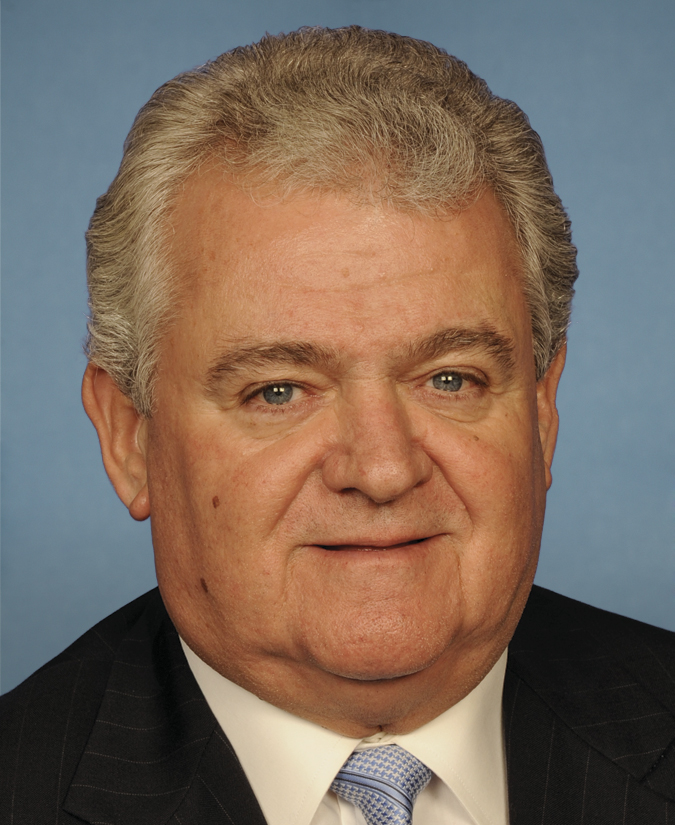

Nominee	Bob Brady	John Featherman
Party	Democratic	Republican
Popular vote	235,394	41,708
Percentage	85.0%	15.0%
- County results Brady: 80–90%
U.S. representative before election
Bob Brady
Democratic
Elected U.S. representative
Bob Brady
Democratic

Pennsylvania's 1st congressional district includes primarily central and South Philadelphia, the City of Chester, the Philadelphia International Airport, and other small sections of Delaware County. It had been represented by Democrat Bob Brady since 1998.

=== Democratic primary ===
==== Candidates ====
===== Nominee =====
- Bob Brady, incumbent U.S. representative

==== Withdrew ====
- Jimmie Moore, Philadelphia Municipal Court judge

==== Primary results ====
Democratic primary results
Party	Candidate	Votes	%
Democratic	Bob Brady (incumbent)	42,744	100.0
Total votes		42,744	100.0

=== Republican primary ===
==== Candidates ====
===== Nominee =====
- John Featherman, realtor and former candidate for mayor of Philadelphia

==== Primary results ====
Republican primary results
Party	Candidate	Votes	%
Republican	John Featherman	10,288	100.0
Total votes		10,288	100.0

=== General election ===
==== Endorsements ====
Bob Brady (D)

Labor unions

- AFL-CIO
- International Brotherhood of Boilermakers
- National Association of Letter Carriers
- National Education Association
- United Steelworkers

Organizations

- Feminist Majority
- Humane Society of the United States
- National Organization for Women
- Planned Parenthood Action Fund
- Sierra Club

Newspapers

- Delaware County Daily Times
- The Philadelphia Inquirer
John Featherman (R)

Organizations

- Eagle Forum

==== Predictions ====
Source	Ranking	As of
The Cook Political Report	Safe D	November 5, 2012
Rothenberg	Safe D	November 2, 2012
Roll Call	Safe D	November 4, 2012
Sabato's Crystal Ball	Safe D	November 5, 2012
NY Times	Safe D	November 4, 2012
RCP	Safe D	November 4, 2012
The Hill	Safe D	November 4, 2012

==== Results ====
Pennsylvania's 1st congressional district, 2012
Party	Candidate	Votes	%
Democratic	Bob Brady (incumbent)	235,394	85.0
Republican	John Featherman	41,708	15.0
Total votes		277,102	100.0
Democratic hold			

== District 2 ==
2012 Pennsylvania's 2nd congressional district election
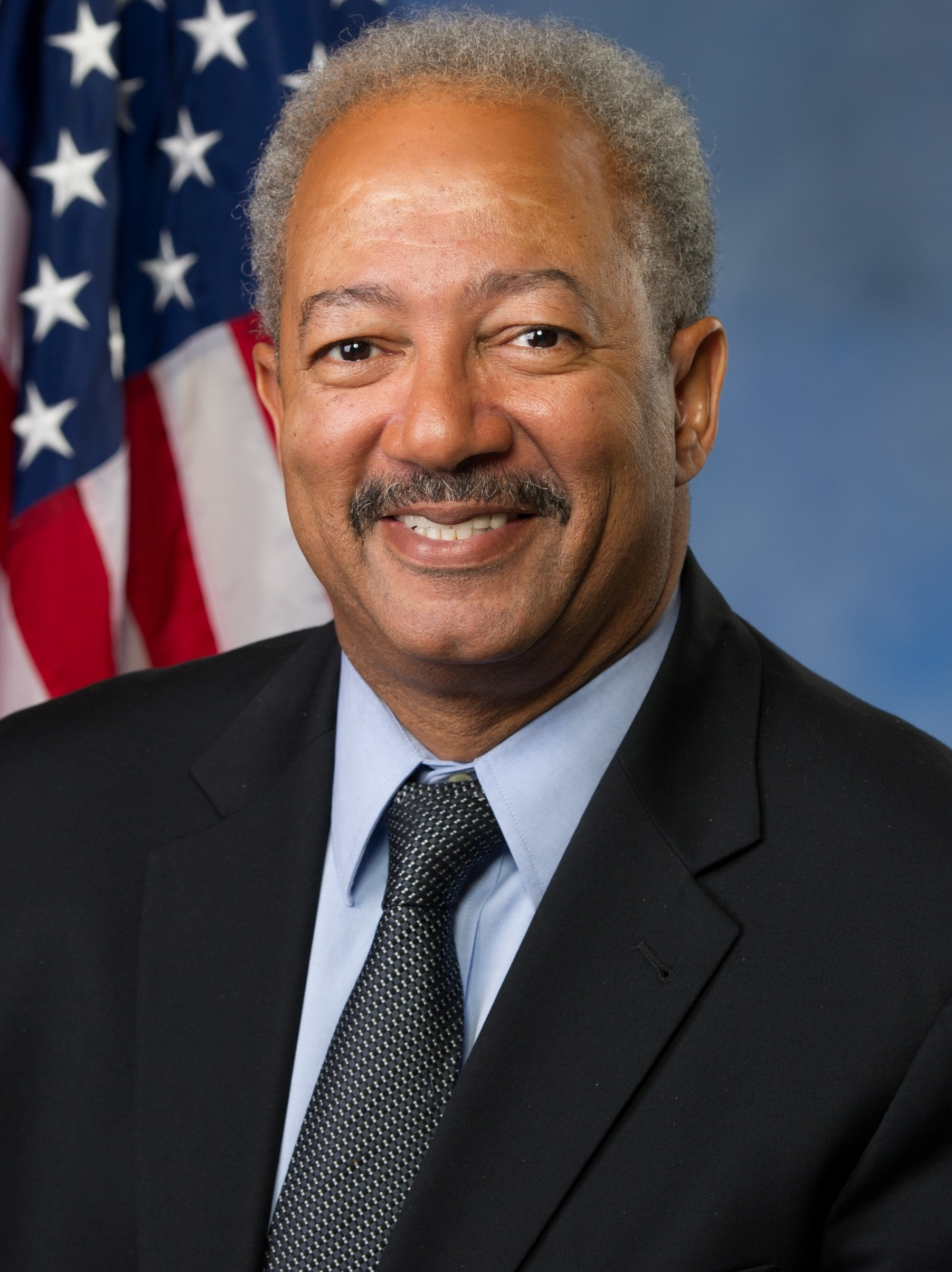

Nominee	Chaka Fattah	Robert Mansfield
Party	Democratic	Republican
Popular vote	318,176	33,381
Percentage	89.3%	9.4%
- County results Fattah: 60–70% 90–100%
U.S. representative before election
Chaka Fattah
Democratic
Elected U.S. representative
Chaka Fattah
Democratic

Pennsylvania's 2nd congressional district includes predominantly African American sections of the city of Philadelphia—West Philadelphia, North Philadelphia, and Northwest Philadelphia—in addition to parts of South Philadelphia, Center City, and western suburbs such as Lower Merion Township in Montgomery County. It had been represented by Democrat Chaka Fattah since 1995.

=== Democratic primary ===
==== Candidates ====
===== Nominee =====
- Chaka Fattah, incumbent U.S. representative

==== Primary results ====
Democratic primary results
Party	Candidate	Votes	%
Democratic	Chaka Fattah (incumbent)	87,620	100.0
Total votes		87,620	100.0

=== Republican primary ===
==== Candidates ====
===== Nominee =====
- Robert Allen Mansfield Jr., businessman and US Army veteran

==== Primary results ====
Republican primary results
Party	Candidate	Votes	%
Republican	Robert Allen Mansfield, Jr.	5,562	100.0
Total votes		5,562	100.0

=== General election ===
==== Endorsements ====
Chaka Fattah (D)

Labor unions

- AFL-CIO
- International Brotherhood of Boilermakers
- National Association of Letter Carriers
- National Education Association
- United Steelworkers

Organizations

- Feminist Majority
- Humane Society of the United States
- National Organization for Women
- Planned Parenthood Action Fund
- Sierra Club

Newspapers

- The Philadelphia Inquirer
Robert Mansfield (R)

Organizations

- Eagle Forum

==== Predictions ====
Source	Ranking	As of
The Cook Political Report	Safe D	November 5, 2012
Rothenberg	Safe D	November 2, 2012
Roll Call	Safe D	November 4, 2012
Sabato's Crystal Ball	Safe D	November 5, 2012
NY Times	Safe D	November 4, 2012
RCP	Safe D	November 4, 2012
The Hill	Safe D	November 4, 2012

==== Results ====
Pennsylvania's 2nd congressional district, 2012
Party	Candidate	Votes	%
Democratic	Chaka Fattah (incumbent)	318,176	89.3
Republican	Robert Mansfield	33,381	9.4
Independent	James Foster	4,829	1.3
Total votes		356,386	100.0
Democratic hold			

== District 3 ==
2012 Pennsylvania's 3rd congressional district election
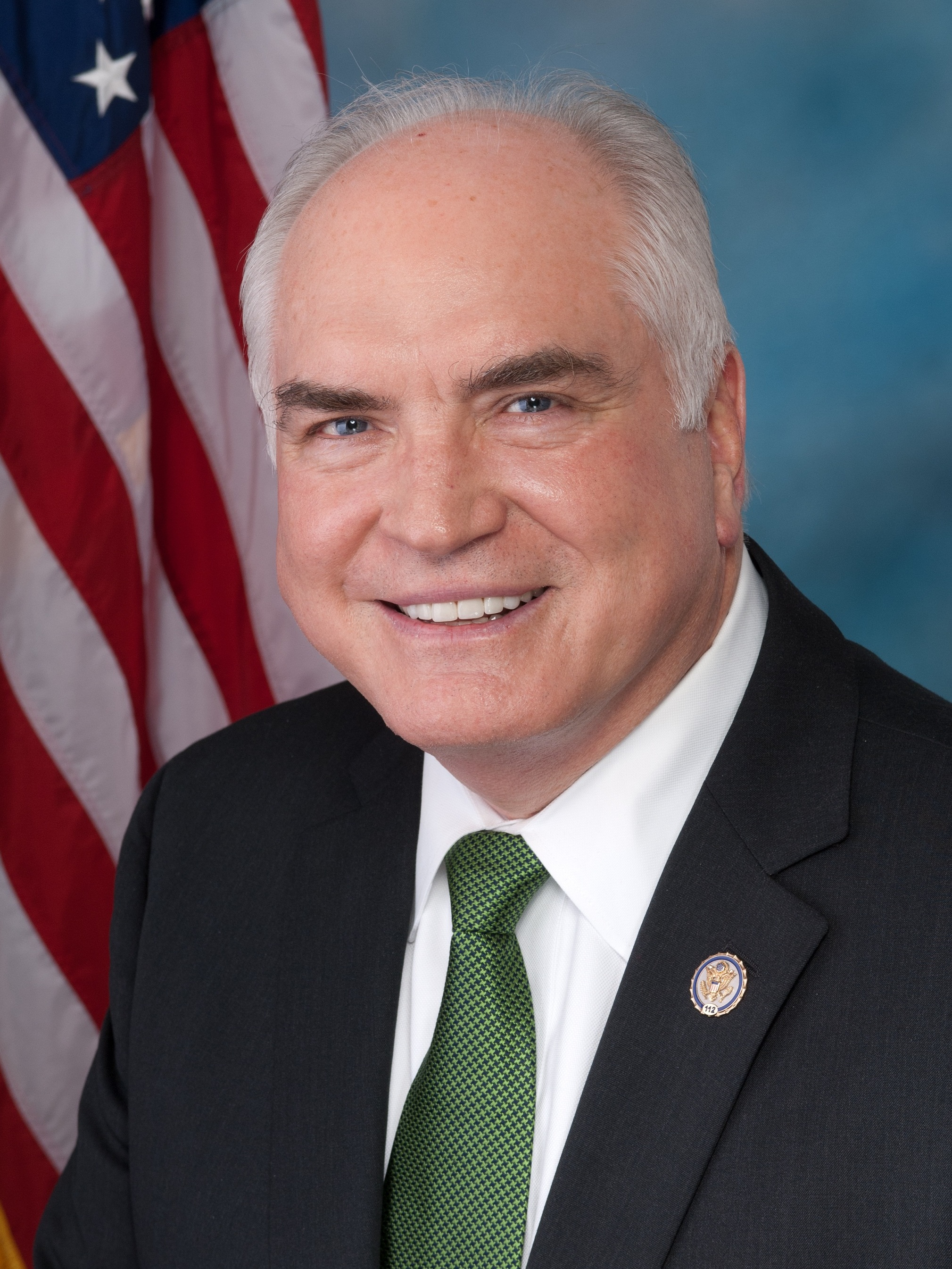

Nominee	Mike Kelly	Missa Eaton
Party	Republican	Democratic
Popular vote	165,826	123,933
Percentage	54.8%	41.0%
- County results Kelly: 50–60% 60–70% Eaton: 40–50% 50–60%
U.S. representative before election
Mike Kelly
Republican
Elected U.S. representative
Mike Kelly
Republican

Pennsylvania's 3rd congressional district is located in the northwestern part of the state and includes the cities of Erie, Sharon, Hermitage, Butler and Meadville. It had been represented by Republican Mike Kelly since January 2011. He ran unopposed in the Republican primary.

=== Republican primary ===
==== Candidates ====
===== Nominee =====
- Mike Kelly, incumbent U.S. representative

==== Primary results ====
Republican primary results
Party	Candidate	Votes	%
Republican	Mike Kelly (incumbent)	46,382	100.0
Total votes		46,382	100.0

=== Democratic primary ===
==== Candidates ====
===== Nominee =====
- Missa Eaton, professor and president of Democratic Women of Mercer County

==== Disqualified ====
- Mel Marin
- George Schroeck, attorney

==== Declined ====
- Kathy Dahlkemper, former U.S. representative
- Ron DiNicola, attorney, Marine Corps veteran and nominee for Pennsylvania's 21st congressional district in 1996
- Joe Sinnott, mayor of Erie

==== Endorsements ====
Missa Eaton

Organizations

- Equality Pennsylvania

==== Primary results ====
Democratic primary results
Party	Candidate	Votes	%
Democratic	Missa Eaton	28,355	100.0
Total votes		28,355	100.0

=== General election ===
==== Endorsements ====
Mike Kelly (R)

Organizations

- Campaign for Working Families
- Eagle Forum
- National Right to Life Committee
- NRA Political Victory Fund
- United States Chamber of Commerce

Newspapers

- New Castle News
- Pittsburgh Tribune-Review
Missa Eaton (D)

Labor unions

- AFL-CIO
- National Education Association
- United Steelworkers

Organizations

- Citizens for Global Solutions
- Equality Pennsylvania
- Feminist Majority
- National Organization for Women
- Planned Parenthood Action Fund
- Sierra Club

==== Predictions ====
Source	Ranking	As of
The Cook Political Report	Safe R	November 5, 2012
Rothenberg	Safe R	November 2, 2012
Roll Call	Safe R	November 4, 2012
Sabato's Crystal Ball	Safe R	November 5, 2012
NY Times	Safe R	November 4, 2012
RCP	Safe R	November 4, 2012
The Hill	Safe R	November 4, 2012

==== Results ====
Pennsylvania's 3rd congressional district, 2012
Party	Candidate	Votes	%
Republican	Mike Kelly (incumbent)	165,826	54.8
Democratic	Missa Eaton	123,933	41.0
Independent	Steven Porter	12,755	4.2
Total votes		302,514	100.0
Republican hold			

== District 4 ==
2012 Pennsylvania's 4th congressional district election
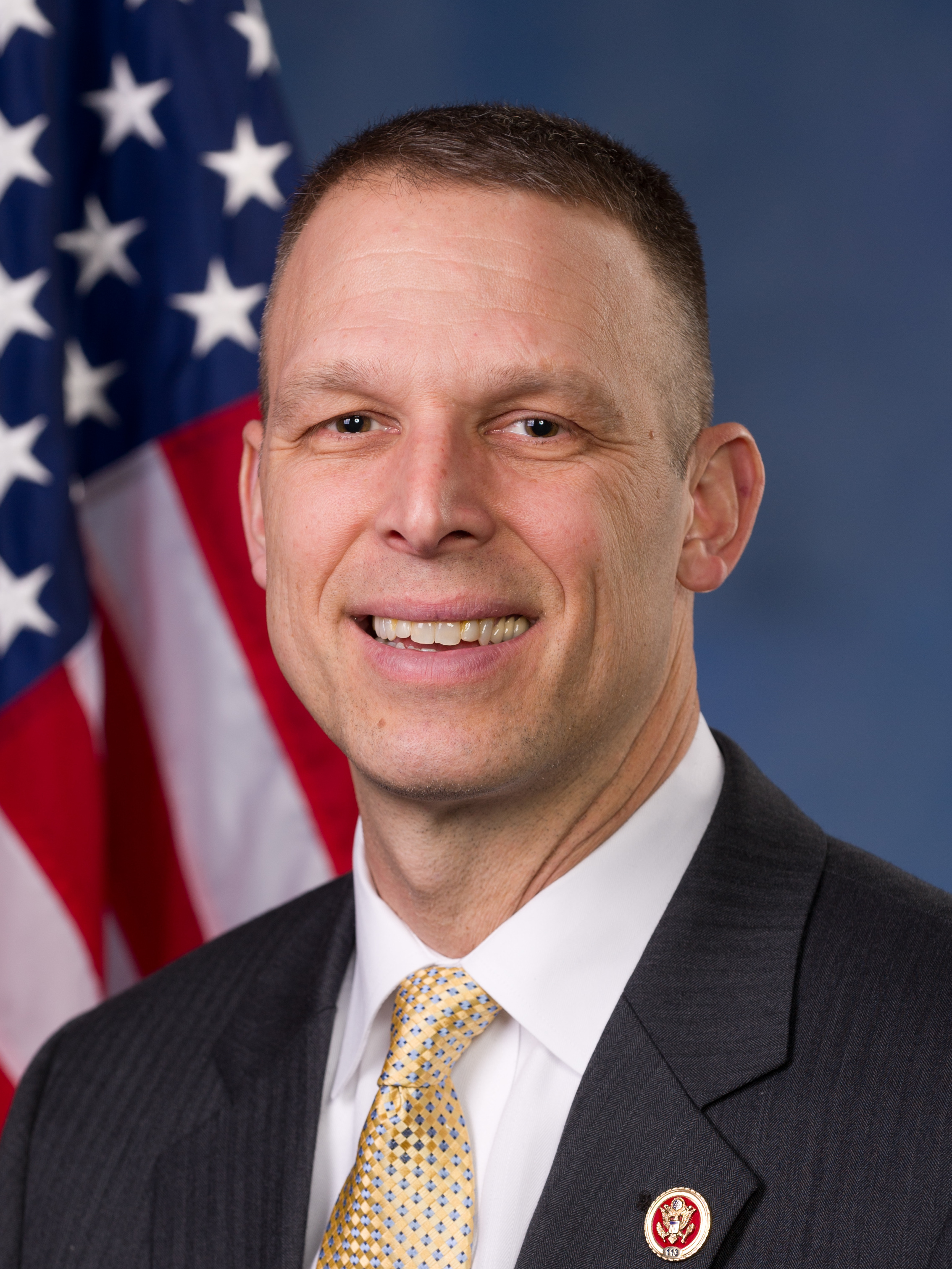

Nominee	Scott Perry	Harry Perkinson
Party	Republican	Democratic
Popular vote	181,603	104,643
Percentage	59.8%	34.4%
- County results Perry: 60–70% Perkinson: 80–90%
U.S. representative before election
Todd Platts
Republican
Elected U.S. representative
Scott Perry
Republican

Pennsylvania's 4th congressional district is located in the south-central part of the state covering all of Adams and York counties, as well as parts of Cumberland and Dauphin counties.

Republican Todd Platts, who had represented Pennsylvania's 19th congressional district since 2001 and had been expected to seek re-election in the new 4th district, did not seek re-election.

=== Republican primary ===
==== Candidates ====
===== Nominee =====
- Scott Perry, state representative

===== Eliminated in primary =====
- Kevin Downs, businessman
- Eric Martin
- Chris Reilly, York County commissioner
- Sean Summers, lawyer who represented Albert Snyder in Snyder v. Phelps
- Mark Swomley, businessman
- Ted Waga, member of the York 912 Patriots

==== Declined ====
- Brock McCleary, deputy political director of the National Republican Congressional Committee
- Todd Platts, incumbent U.S. representative

==== Endorsements ====
Chris Reilly

Organizations

- Eagle Forum

==== Primary results ====
Republican primary results
Party	Candidate	Votes	%
Republican	Scott Perry	34,881	53.5
Republican	Christopher Reilly	12,143	18.6
Republican	Sean Summers	9,316	14.3
Republican	Theodore Waga	3,086	4.7
Republican	Eric Robert Martin	2,159	3.3
Republican	Mark Swomley	2,150	3.3
Republican	Kevin Downs	1,451	2.2
Total votes		65,186	100.0

=== Democratic primary ===
==== Candidates ====
===== Nominee =====
- Harry Perkinson, Texas-based defense contractor employee

===== Eliminated in primary =====
- Ken Lee, attorney

===== Withdrawn =====
- Matt Matsunaga, businessman

==== Declined ====
- John Brenner, former mayor of York
- Eugene DePasquale, state representative (running for auditor general)
- Doug Hoke, York County commissioner
- Matt Matsunaga, former co-chair of the College Republicans at Catonsville Community College
- Ryan Sanders, nominee for Pennsylvania's 19th congressional district in 2010

==== Primary results ====
Democratic primary results
Party	Candidate	Votes	%
Democratic	Harry Perkinson	14,188	56.0
Democratic	Ken Lee	11,134	44.0
Total votes		25,322	100.0

=== General election ===
==== Endorsements ====
Scott Perry (R)

Organizations

- Eagle Forum
- National Right to Life Committee
- NRA Political Victory Fund
- United States Chamber of Commerce
Harry Perkinson (D)

Labor unions

- AFL-CIO
- International Brotherhood of Boilermakers

Organizations

- Equality Pennsylvania

==== Predictions ====
Source	Ranking	As of
The Cook Political Report	Safe R	November 5, 2012
Rothenberg	Safe R	November 2, 2012
Roll Call	Safe R	November 4, 2012
Sabato's Crystal Ball	Safe R	November 5, 2012
NY Times	Safe R	November 4, 2012
RCP	Safe R	November 4, 2012
The Hill	Safe R	November 4, 2012

==== Results ====
Pennsylvania's 4th congressional district, 2012
Party	Candidate	Votes	%
Republican	Scott Perry	181,603	59.8
Democratic	Harry Perkinson	104,643	34.4
Independent	Wayne Wolff	11,524	3.8
Libertarian	Mike Koffenberger	6,210	2.0
Total votes		303,980	100.0
Republican hold			

== District 5 ==
2012 Pennsylvania's 5th congressional district election
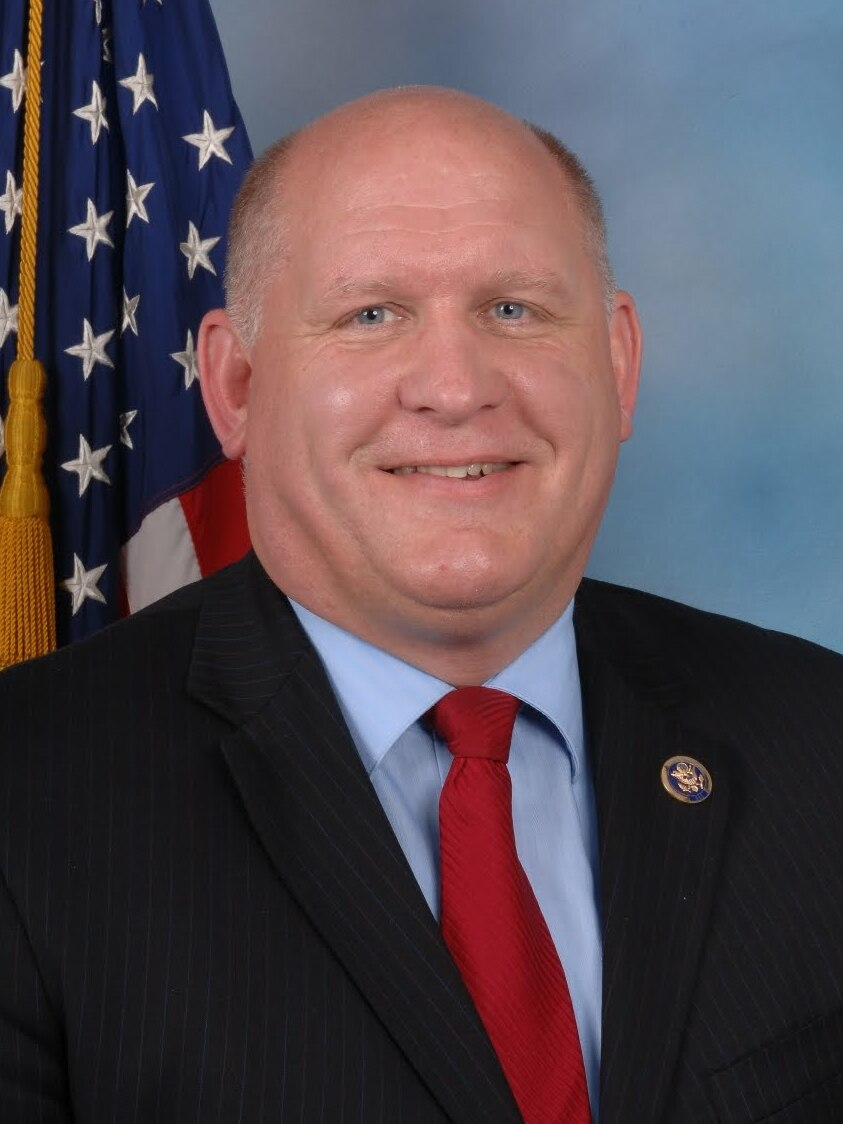

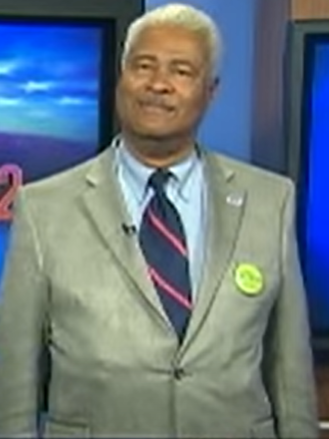
Nominee	Glenn Thompson	Charles Dumas
Party	Republican	Democratic
Popular vote	177,740	104,725
Percentage	62.9%	37.1%
- County results Thompson: 50–60% 60–70% 70–80%
U.S. representative before election
Glenn Thompson
Republican
Elected U.S. representative
Glenn Thompson
Republican

Pennsylvania's 5th congressional district is located in north central Pennsylvania. It is the largest in area, and least densely populated, of all of Pennsylvania's congressional districts. It had been represented by Republican incumbent Glenn Thompson, who was first elected in 2008.

=== Republican primary ===
==== Candidates ====
===== Nominee =====
- Glenn Thompson, incumbent U.S. representative

==== Primary results ====
Republican primary results
Party	Candidate	Votes	%
Republican	Glenn Thompson (incumbent)	49,941	100.0
Total votes		49,941	100.0

=== Democratic primary ===
==== Candidates ====
===== Nominee =====
- Charles Dumas, professor at Penn State University

==== Primary results ====
Democratic primary results
Party	Candidate	Votes	%
Democratic	Charles Dumas	25,252	100.0
Total votes		25,252	100.0

=== General election ===
==== Endorsements ====
Glenn Thompson (R)

Organizations

- Campaign for Working Families
- Eagle Forum
- National Right to Life Committee
- NRA Political Victory Fund
- United States Chamber of Commerce
Charles Dumas (D)

Labor unions

- AFL-CIO
- International Brotherhood of Boilermakers

Organizations

- National Organization for Women

==== Predictions ====
Source	Ranking	As of
The Cook Political Report	Safe R	November 5, 2012
Rothenberg	Safe R	November 2, 2012
Roll Call	Safe R	November 4, 2012
Sabato's Crystal Ball	Safe R	November 5, 2012
NY Times	Safe R	November 4, 2012
RCP	Safe R	November 4, 2012
The Hill	Safe R	November 4, 2012

==== Results ====
Pennsylvania's 5th congressional district, 2012
Party	Candidate	Votes	%
Republican	Glenn Thompson (incumbent)	177,740	62.9
Democratic	Charles Dumas	104,725	37.1
Total votes		282,465	100.0
Republican hold			

== District 6 ==
2012 Pennsylvania's 6th congressional district election
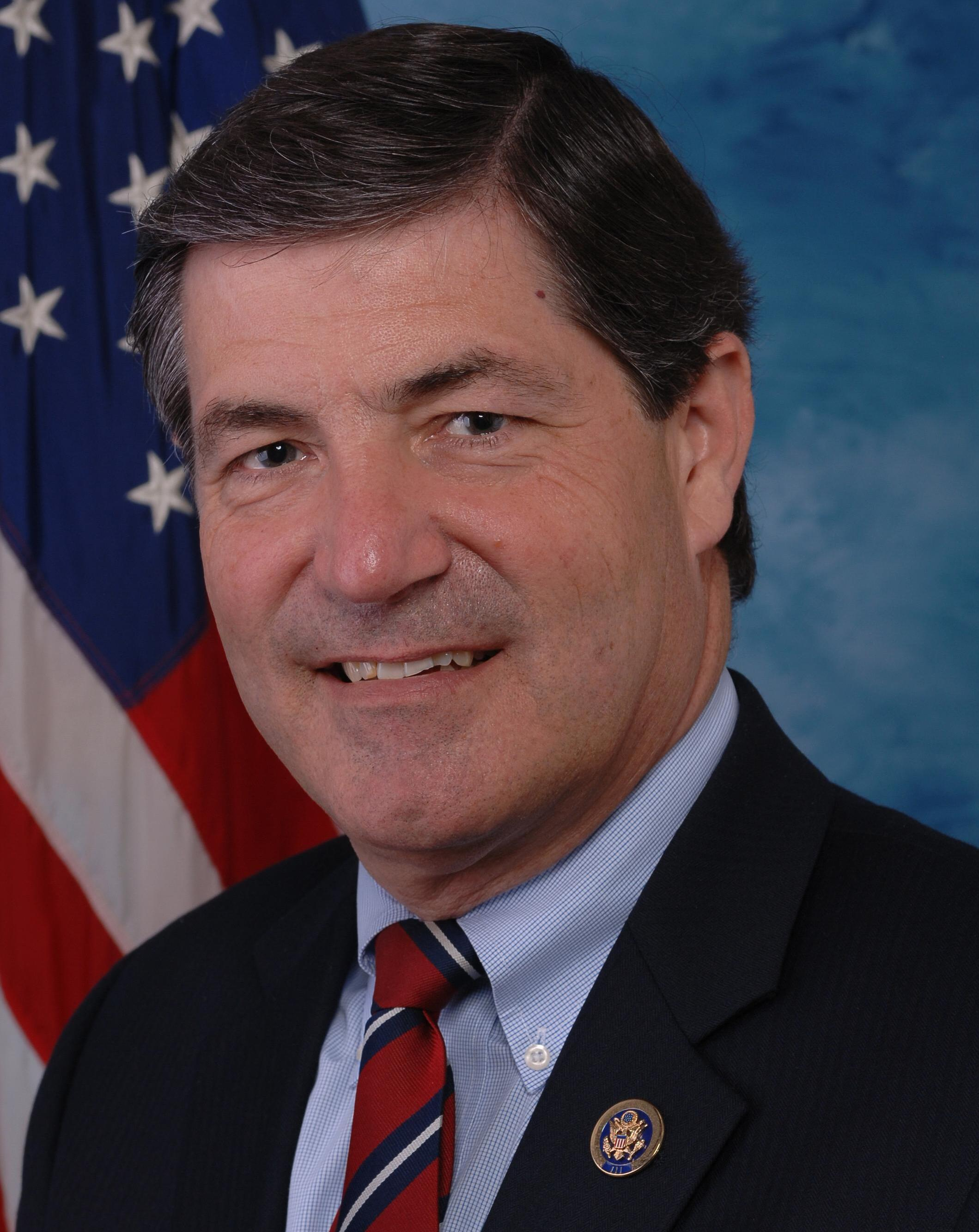

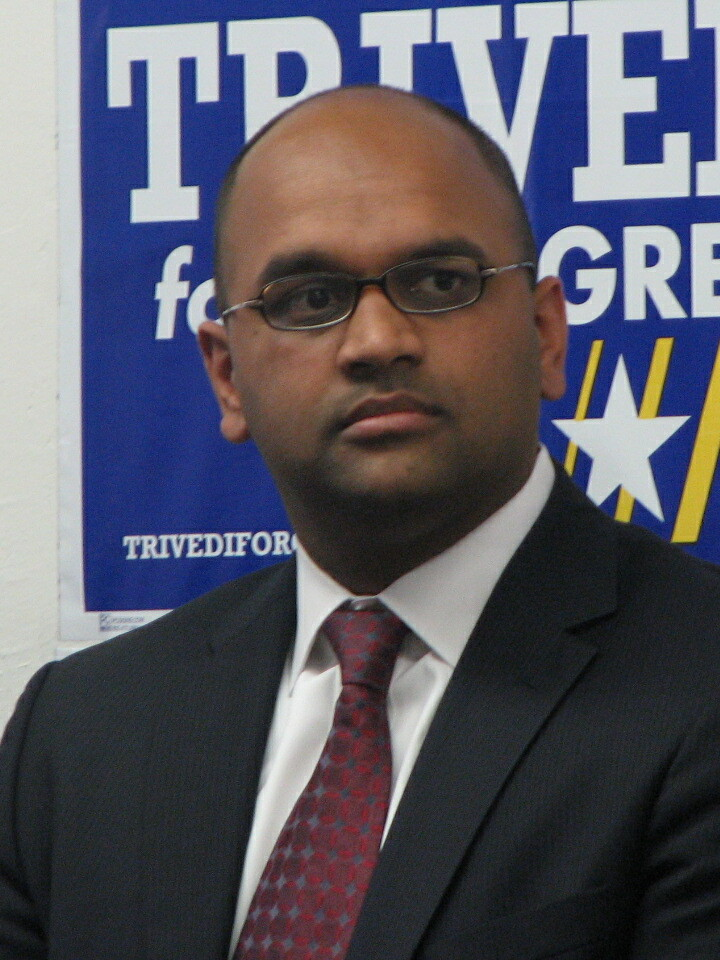
Nominee	Jim Gerlach	Manan Trivedi
Party	Republican	Democratic
Popular vote	191,725	143,803
Percentage	57.1%	42.9%
- County results Gerlach: 50–60% 60–70%
U.S. representative before election
Jim Gerlach
Republican
Elected U.S. representative
Jim Gerlach
Republican

Pennsylvania's 6th congressional district is located in the southeastern part of the state, with a combination of some very affluent suburban areas of Philadelphia and sparsely populated rural areas. It had been represented by Republican Jim Gerlach since 2003, and he ran for re-election.

=== Republican primary ===
==== Candidates ====
===== Nominee =====
- Jim Gerlach, incumbent U.S. representative

==== Primary results ====
Republican primary results
Party	Candidate	Votes	%
Republican	Jim Gerlach (incumbent)	45,206	100.0
Total votes		45,206	100.0

=== Democratic primary ===
==== Candidates ====
===== Nominee =====
- Manan Trivedi, physician, Iraq War veteran, and nominee for this seat in 2010

==== Declined ====
- Doug Pike, candidate for this seat in 2010

==== Primary results ====
Democratic primary results
Party	Candidate	Votes	%
Democratic	Manan M. Trivedi	20,037	100.0
Total votes		20,037	100.0

=== General election ===
==== Endorsements ====
Jim Gerlach (R)

Labor unions

- National Association of Letter Carriers
- National Education Association

Organizations

- Eagle Forum
- Humane Society of the United States
- National Right to Life Committee
- NRA Political Victory Fund
- United States Chamber of Commerce

Newspapers

- The Philadelphia Inquirer
Manan Trivedi (D)

Labor unions

- AFL-CIO
- International Brotherhood of Boilermakers
- United Steelworkers

Organizations

- Council for a Livable World
- Democracy for America
- Democratic Congressional Campaign Committee "Red to Blue" Program
- Environment America
- Feminist Majority
- National Organization for Women
- Planned Parenthood Action Fund
- Progressive Change Campaign Committee
- Sierra Club
- Veterans' Alliance for Security and Democracy
- VoteVets

==== Polling ====
Poll source	Date(s) administered	Sample size	Margin of error	Jim Gerlach (R)	Manan Trivedi (D)	Undecided
WPA Opinion Research Gerlach (R)	August 20–21, 2012	400	±4.9%	54%	30%	17%

==== Predictions ====
Source	Ranking	As of
The Cook Political Report	Likely R	November 5, 2012
Rothenberg	Safe R	November 2, 2012
Roll Call	Safe R	November 4, 2012
Sabato's Crystal Ball	Likely R	November 5, 2012
NY Times	Lean R	November 4, 2012
RCP	Likely R	November 4, 2012
The Hill	Likely R	November 4, 2012

==== Results ====
Pennsylvania's 6th congressional district, 2012
Party	Candidate	Votes	%
Republican	Jim Gerlach (Incumbent)	191,725	57.1
Democratic	Manan Trivedi	143,803	42.9
Total votes		335,528	100.0
Republican hold			

== District 7 ==
2012 Pennsylvania's 7th congressional district election
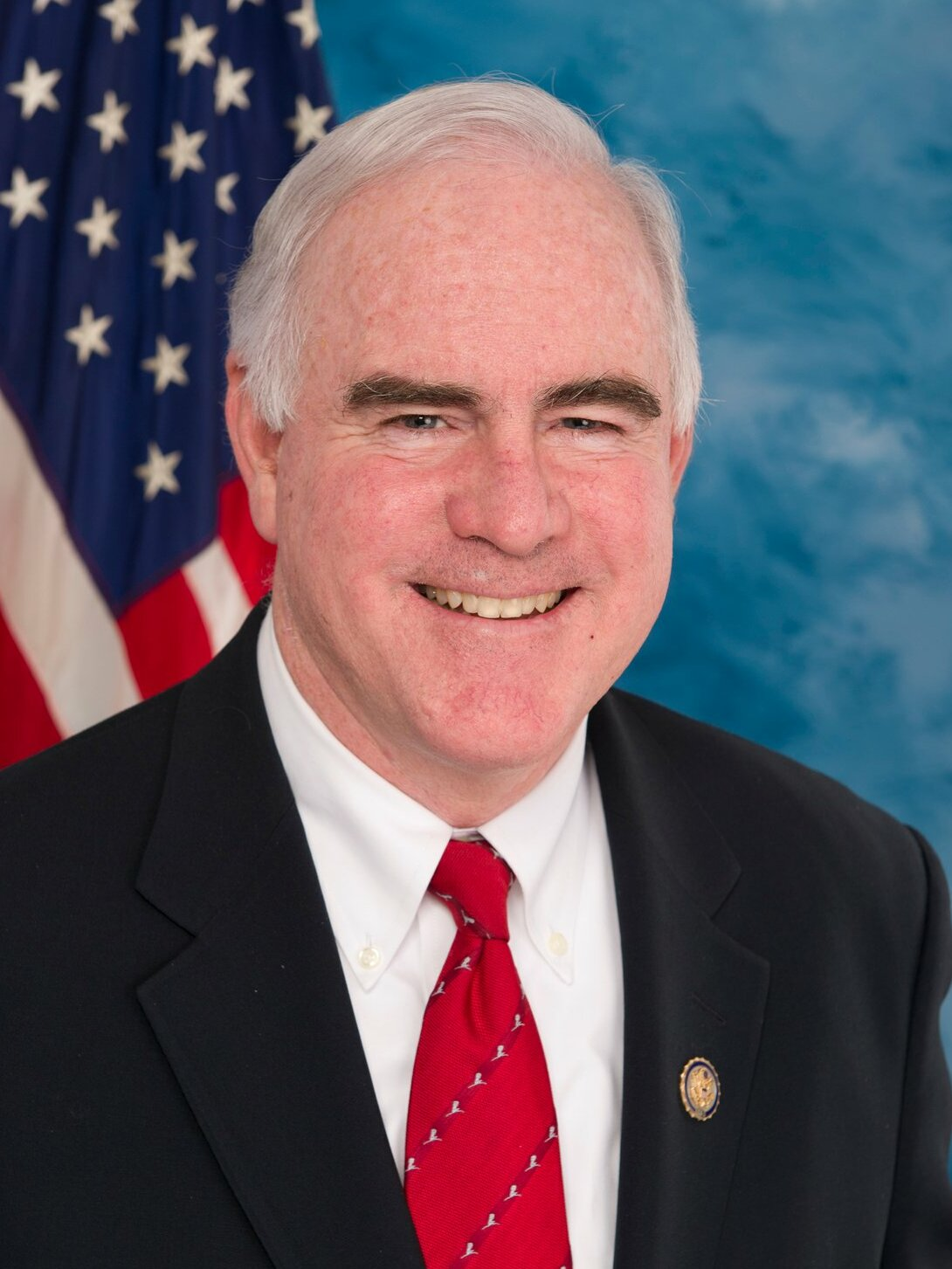

Nominee	Pat Meehan	George Badey
Party	Republican	Democratic
Popular vote	209,942	143,509
Percentage	59.4%	40.6%
- County results Meehan: 50–60% 60–70% 70–80%
U.S. Representative before election
Pat Meehan
Republican
Elected U.S. Representative
Pat Meehan
Republican

The 7th district incorporates parts of the Philadelphia suburbs, including most of Delaware County along with portions of Chester County, Montgomery County, Berks County, and Lancaster County. It had been represented by Republican Pat Meehan since January 2011. He ran for re-election.

=== Republican primary ===
==== Candidates ====
===== Nominee =====
- Pat Meehan, incumbent U.S. representative

==== Primary results ====
Republican primary results
Party	Candidate	Votes	%
Republican	Patrick L. Meehan (incumbent)	55,387	100.0
Total votes		55,387	100.0

=== Democratic primary ===
==== Candidates ====
===== Nominee =====
- George Badey III, attorney

==== Declined ====
- Joe Sestak, former U.S. representative and nominee for U.S. Senate in 2010
- Jack Stollsteimer, former Safe Schools advocate

==== Primary results ====
Democratic primary results
Party	Candidate	Votes	%
Democratic	George Badey	20,075	100.0
Total votes		20,075	100.0

=== General election ===
==== Endorsements ====
Pat Meehan (R)

Labor unions

- Fraternal Order of Police
- National Association of Letter Carriers
- National Education Association

Organizations

- Eagle Forum
- Humane Society of the United States
- National Republican Congressional Committee "Patriot" Program
- National Right to Life Committee
- NRA Political Victory Fund
- United States Chamber of Commerce

Newspapers

- Delaware County Daily Times
- Intelligencer Journal
- The Philadelphia Inquirer
George Badey (D)

Labor unions

- United Steelworkers

Organizations

- Democratic Congressional Campaign Committee "Red to Blue" Program
- National Organization for Women
- Planned Parenthood Action Fund

==== Polling ====
Poll source	Date(s) administered	Sample size	Margin of error	Pat Meehan (R)	George Badey (D)	Undecided
GBA Strategies Badey (D)	May 30–June 3, 2012	400	±4.9%	50%	30%	20%

==== Predictions ====
Source	Ranking	As of
The Cook Political Report	Safe R	November 5, 2012
Rothenberg	Safe R	November 2, 2012
Roll Call	Safe R	November 4, 2012
Sabato's Crystal Ball	Safe R	November 5, 2012
NY Times	Lean R	November 4, 2012
RCP	Safe R	November 4, 2012
The Hill	Likely R	November 4, 2012

==== Results ====
Pennsylvania's 7th congressional district, 2012
Party	Candidate	Votes	%
Republican	Pat Meehan (incumbent)	209,942	59.4
Democratic	George Badey	143,509	40.6
Total votes		353,451	100.0
Republican hold			

== District 8 ==
2012 Pennsylvania's 8th congressional district election
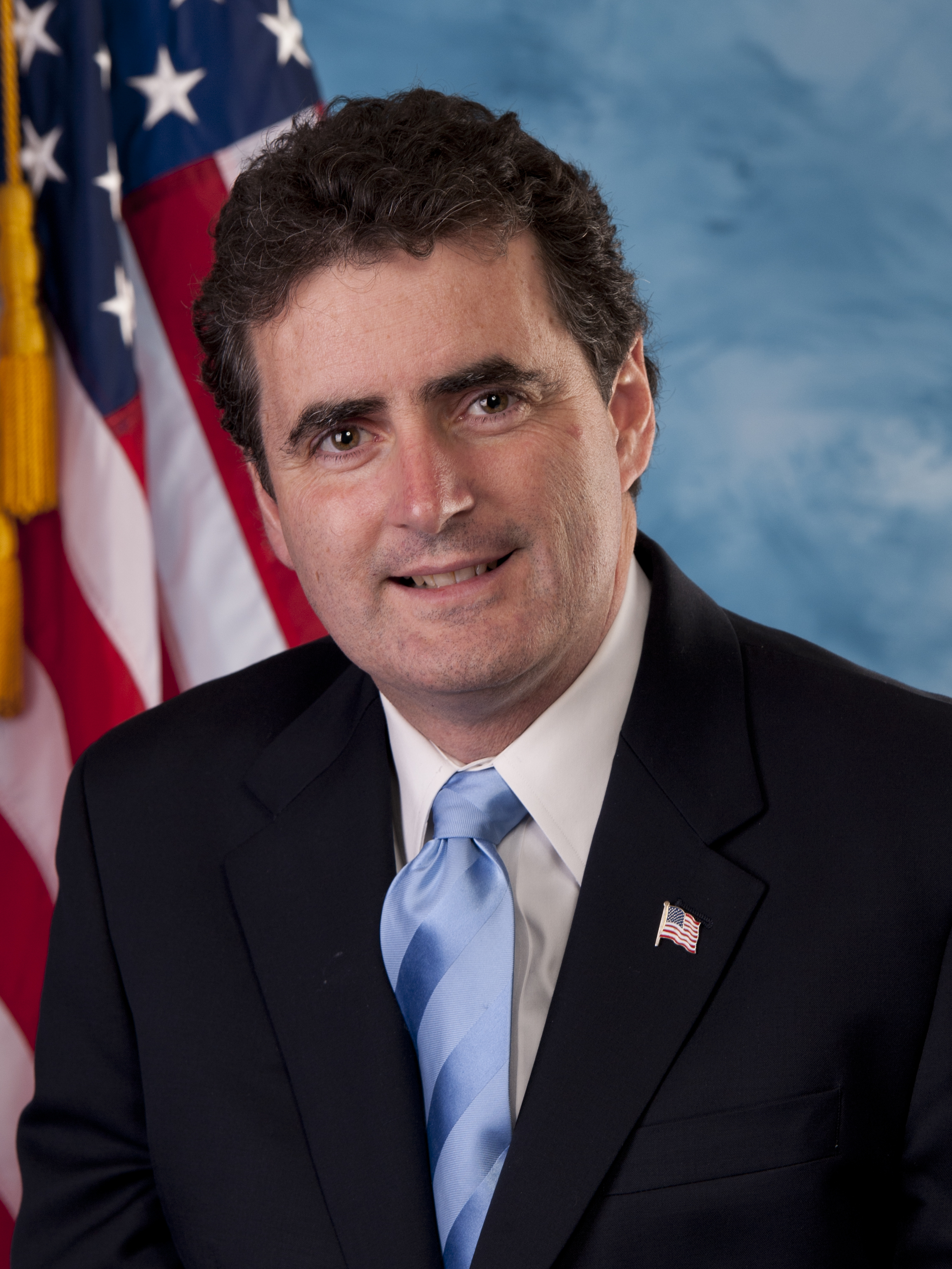

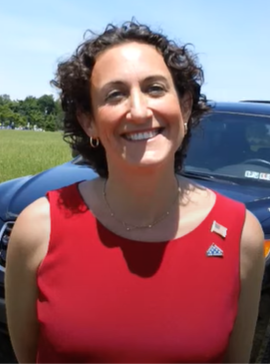
Nominee	Mike Fitzpatrick	Kathy Boockvar
Party	Republican	Democratic
Popular vote	199,379	152,859
Percentage	56.6%	43.4%
- County results Fitzpatrick: 50–60% 60–70%
U.S. representative before election
Mike Fitzpatrick
Republican
Elected U.S. representative
Mike Fitzpatrick
Republican

Pennsylvania's 8th congressional district is located in Bucks County, along with portions of Montgomery County. It had been represented by Republican Mike Fitzpatrick since January 2011. Fitzpatrick previously represented the district from 2005 until 2007. He ran unopposed in the Republican primary.

=== Republican primary ===
==== Candidates ====
===== Nominee =====
- Mike Fitzpatrick, incumbent U.S. representative

==== Declined ====
- Jennifer Stefano, activist

==== Primary results ====
Republican primary results
Party	Candidate	Votes	%
Republican	Mike Fitzpatrick (incumbent)	42,395	100.0
Total votes		42,395	100.0

=== Democratic primary ===
==== Candidates ====
===== Nominee =====
- Kathy Boockvar, attorney and nominee for Commonwealth Court of Pennsylvania in 2011

==== Declined ====
- Det Asinn, Doylestown Borough Council president
- Diane Marseglia, Bucks County commissioner
- Cynthia Philo, Doylestown Township supervisor

==== Endorsements ====
Kathy Boockvar

Organizations

- Equality Pennsylvania

==== Primary results ====
Democratic primary results
Party	Candidate	Votes	%
Democratic	Kathy Boockvar	25,595	100.0
Total votes		25,595	100.0

=== General election ===
==== Endorsements ====
Mike Fitzpatrick (R)

Labor unions

- National Association of Letter Carriers

Organizations

- Eagle Forum
- Humane Society of the United States
- National Republican Congressional Committee "Patriot" Program
- National Right to Life Committee
- NRA Political Victory Fund
- United States Chamber of Commerce
Kathryn Boockvar (D)

Labor unions

- AFL-CIO
- Communications Workers of America
- International Brotherhood of Boilermakers
- National Education Association

Organizations

- Democracy for America
- Democratic Congressional Campaign Committee "Red to Blue" Program
- EMILY's List
- Environment America
- Equality Pennsylvania
- Feminist Majority
- NARAL Pro-Choice America
- National Organization for Women
- Planned Parenthood Action Fund

Newspapers

- The Intelligencer
- The Philadelphia Inquirer

==== Predictions ====
Source	Ranking	As of
The Cook Political Report	Lean R	November 5, 2012
Rothenberg	Likely R	November 2, 2012
Roll Call	Safe R	November 4, 2012
Sabato's Crystal Ball	Likely R	November 5, 2012
NY Times	Lean R	November 4, 2012
RCP	Likely R	November 4, 2012
The Hill	Lean R	November 4, 2012

==== Results ====
Pennsylvania's 8th congressional district, 2012
Party	Candidate	Votes	%
Republican	Mike Fitzpatrick (incumbent)	199,379	56.6
Democratic	Kathy Boockvar	152,859	43.4
Total votes		352,238	100.0
Republican hold			

== District 9 ==
2012 Pennsylvania's 9th congressional district election
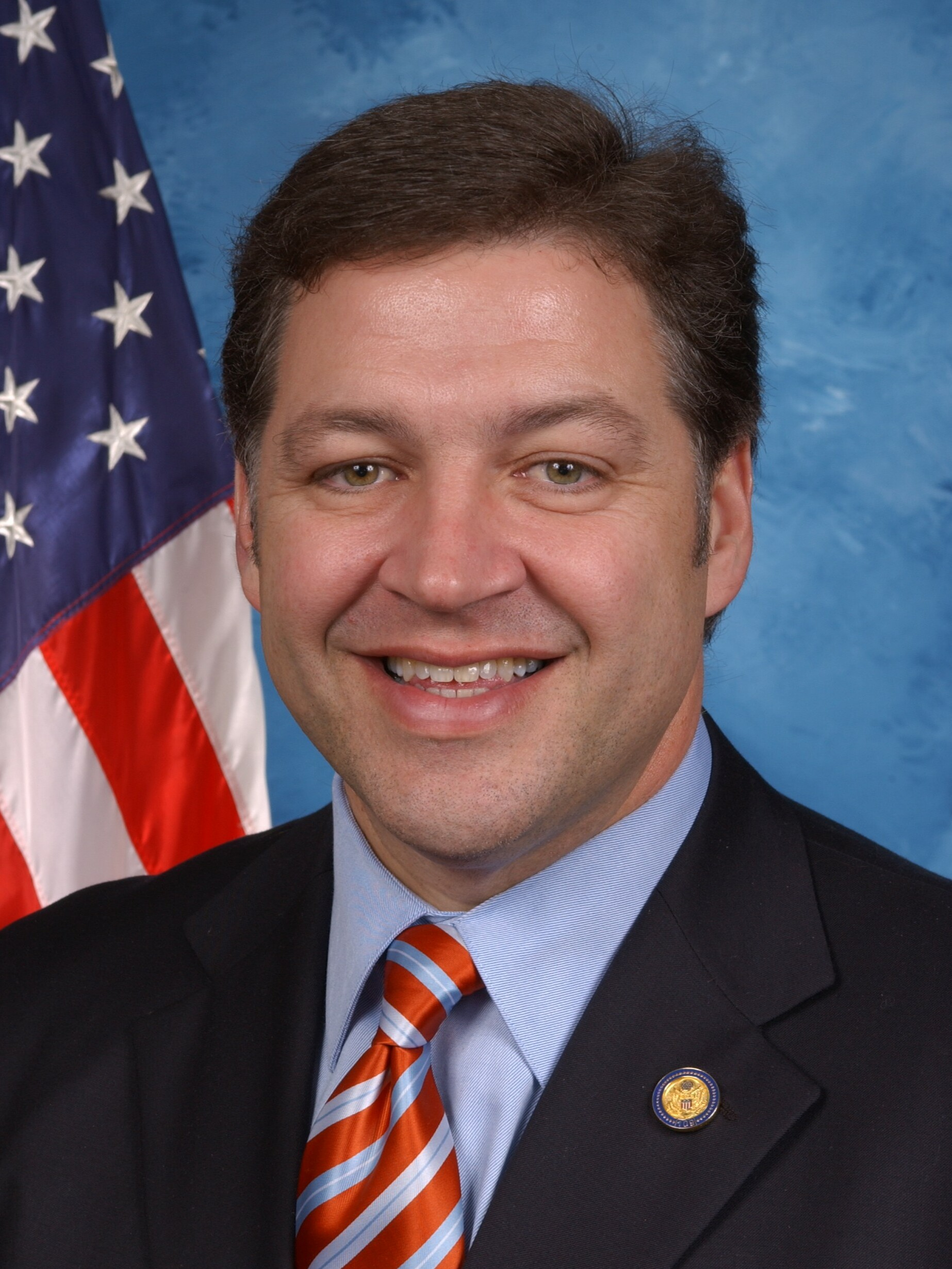

Nominee	Bill Shuster	Karen Ramsburg
Party	Republican	Democratic
Popular vote	169,177	105,128
Percentage	61.7%	38.3%
- County results Shuster: 50–60% 60–70% 70–80% Ramsburg: 50–60% 60–70%
U.S. representative before election
Bill Shuster
Republican
Elected U.S. representative
Bill Shuster
Republican

Pennsylvania's 9th congressional district is located in the South Western part of the state. Redistricting added majority-Democratic Fayette County as well as some of the Democratic portions of Washington, Greene, Cambria and Westmoreland counties. It had been represented by Republican Bill Shuster since 2001. He ran for re-election.

=== Republican primary ===
==== Candidates ====
===== Nominee =====
- Bill Shuster, incumbent U.S. representative

===== Disqualified =====
- Travis Schooley, businessman

==== Primary results ====
Republican primary results
Party	Candidate	Votes	%
Republican	Bill Shuster (incumbent)	41,735	100.0
Total votes		41,735	100.0

=== Democratic primary ===
Karen Ramsburg, a nurse from Mercersburg, had been running as an independent, but after no Democrat filed to run, she mounted a write-in campaign for the April primary. She was successful, receiving enough write-in votes to receive the Democratic nomination.

==== Candidates ====
===== Nominee =====
- Karen Ramsburg, nurse

=== General election ===
==== Endorsements ====
Bill Shuster (R)

Organizations

- Campaign for Working Families
- Eagle Forum
- National Right to Life Committee
- NRA Political Victory Fund
- United States Chamber of Commerce

Newspapers

- Pittsburgh Tribune-Review
Karen Ramsburg (D)

U.S. representatives

- Joe Sestak, representative for Pennsylvania's 7th congressional district (2007–2011) and nominee for the Senate in 2010

==== Predictions ====
Source	Ranking	As of
The Cook Political Report	Safe R	November 5, 2012
Rothenberg	Safe R	November 2, 2012
Roll Call	Safe R	November 4, 2012
Sabato's Crystal Ball	Safe R	November 5, 2012
NY Times	Safe R	November 4, 2012
RCP	Safe R	November 4, 2012
The Hill	Safe R	November 4, 2012

==== Results ====
Pennsylvania's 9th congressional district, 2012
Party	Candidate	Votes	%
Republican	Bill Shuster (incumbent)	169,177	61.7
Democratic	Karen Ramsburg	105,128	38.3
Total votes		274,305	100.0
Republican hold			

== District 10 ==
2012 Pennsylvania's 10th congressional district election
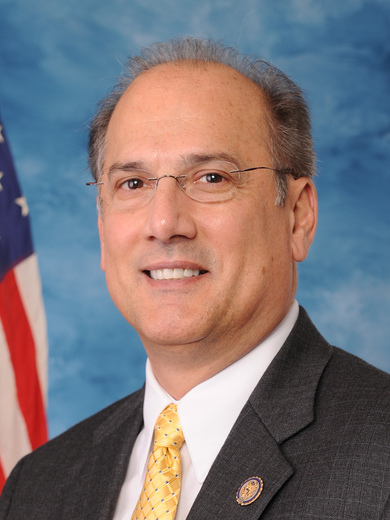

Nominee	Tom Marino	Philip Scollo
Party	Republican	Democratic
Popular vote	179,563	94,227
Percentage	65.6%	34.4%
- County results Marino: 50–60% 60–70% 70–80% Scollo: 50–60%
U.S. representative before election
Tom Marino
Republican
Elected U.S. representative
Tom Marino
Republican

Pennsylvania's 10th congressional district is located in the central and northeast regions of the state. It had been represented by Republican Tom Marino since January 2011. He ran for re-election.

=== Republican primary ===
==== Candidates ====
===== Nominee =====
- Tom Marino, incumbent U.S. representative

==== Primary results ====
Republican primary results
Party	Candidate	Votes	%
Republican	Thomas Marino (incumbent)	51,373	100.0
Total votes		51,373	100.0

=== Democratic primary ===
==== Candidates ====
===== Nominee =====
- Philip Scollo, businessman

==== Declined ====
- Chris Carney, former U.S. representative

==== Primary results ====
Democratic primary results
Party	Candidate	Votes	%
Democratic	Philip Scollo	19,291	100.0
Total votes		19,291	100.0

=== General election ===
==== Endorsements ====
Tom Marino (R)

Labor unions

- National Association of Letter Carriers

Organizations

- Campaign for Working Families
- Eagle Forum
- National Right to Life Committee
- NRA Political Victory Fund
- United States Chamber of Commerce
Philip Scollo (D)

Labor unions

- AFL-CIO
- International Brotherhood of Boilermakers

==== Polling ====
Poll source	Date(s) administered	Sample size	Margin of error	Tom Marino (R)	Philip Scollo (D)	Undecided
Public Policy Polling (D-Scollo)	July 16–17, 2012	550	±4.18%	47%	30%	23%

==== Predictions ====
Source	Ranking	As of
The Cook Political Report	Safe R	November 5, 2012
Rothenberg	Safe R	November 2, 2012
Roll Call	Safe R	November 4, 2012
Sabato's Crystal Ball	Safe R	November 5, 2012
NY Times	Safe R	November 4, 2012
RCP	Safe R	November 4, 2012
The Hill	Safe R	November 4, 2012

==== Results ====
Pennsylvania's 10th congressional district, 2012
Party	Candidate	Votes	%
Republican	Tom Marino (incumbent)	179,563	65.6
Democratic	Philip Scollo	94,227	34.4
Total votes		273,790	100.0
Republican hold			

== District 11 ==
2012 Pennsylvania's 11th congressional district election
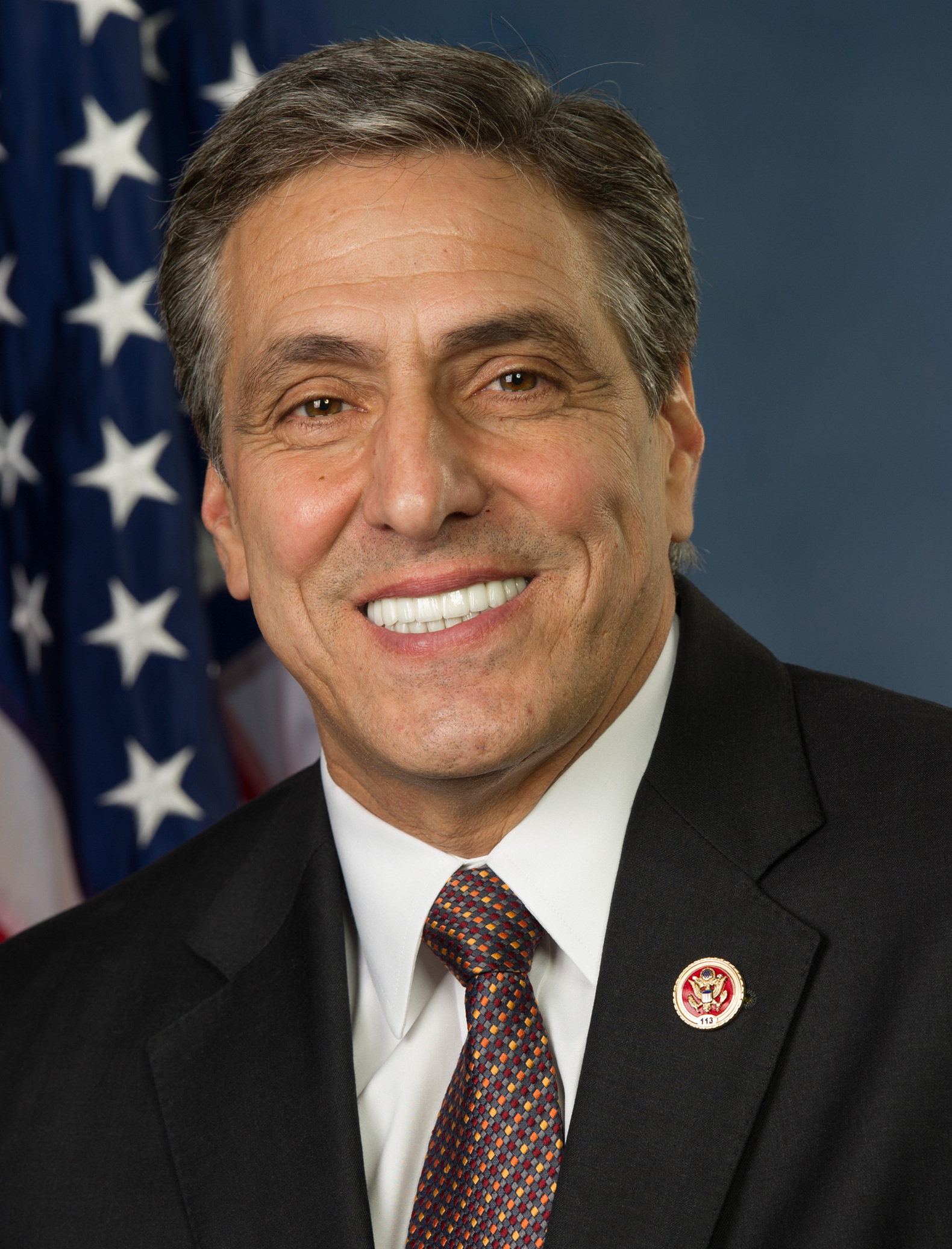

Nominee	Lou Barletta	Gene Stilp
Party	Republican	Democratic
Popular vote	166,967	118,231
Percentage	58.5%	41.5%
- County results Barletta: 50–60% 60–70%
U.S. representative before election
Lou Barletta
Republican
Elected U.S. representative
Lou Barletta
Republican

Pennsylvania's 11th congressional district stretches from the Poconos all the way to the suburbs of Harrisburg. It had been represented by Republican Lou Barletta since January 2011.

=== Republican primary ===
==== Candidates ====
===== Nominee =====
- Lou Barletta, incumbent U.S. representative

==== Primary results ====
Republican primary results
Party	Candidate	Votes	%
Republican	Lou Barletta (incumbent)	49,511	100.0
Total votes		49,511	100.0

=== Democratic primary ===
==== Candidates ====
===== Nominee =====
- Gene Stilp, activist, candidate for lieutenant governor in 2006, and candidate for state representative in 2010

===== Eliminated in primary =====
- William Vinsko, lawyer and assistant Wilkes-Barre city attorney

==== Declined ====
- Chris Doherty, mayor of Scranton
- Paul Kanjorski, former U.S. representative
- Michael Lombardo, former mayor of Pittston
- Corey O'Brien, Lackawanna County commissioner and candidate for this seat in 2010

==== Endorsements ====
Gene Stilp

Organizations

- Equality Pennsylvania

==== Primary results ====
Democratic primary results
Party	Candidate	Votes	%
Democratic	Gene Stilp	18,716	54.5
Democratic	Bill Vinsko	15,609	45.5
Total votes		34,325	100.0

=== General election ===
==== Endorsements ====
Lou Barletta (R)

Organizations

- Campaign for Working Families
- Eagle Forum
- Gun Owners of America
- National Right to Life Committee
- NRA Political Victory Fund
- United States Chamber of Commerce
Gene Stilp (D)

Labor unions

- AFL-CIO
- International Brotherhood of Boilermakers

Organizations

- Environment America
- Equality Pennsylvania

Newspapers

- The Citizens' Voice
- The Patriot-News

==== Predictions ====
Source	Ranking	As of
The Cook Political Report	Safe R	November 5, 2012
Rothenberg	Safe R	November 2, 2012
Roll Call	Safe R	November 4, 2012
Sabato's Crystal Ball	Safe R	November 5, 2012
NY Times	Safe R	November 4, 2012
RCP	Safe R	November 4, 2012
The Hill	Likely R	November 4, 2012

==== Results ====
Pennsylvania's 11th congressional district, 2012
Party	Candidate	Votes	%
Republican	Lou Barletta (incumbent)	166,967	58.5
Democratic	Gene Stilp	118,231	41.5
Total votes		285,198	100.0
Republican hold			

== District 12 ==
2012 Pennsylvania's 12th congressional district election
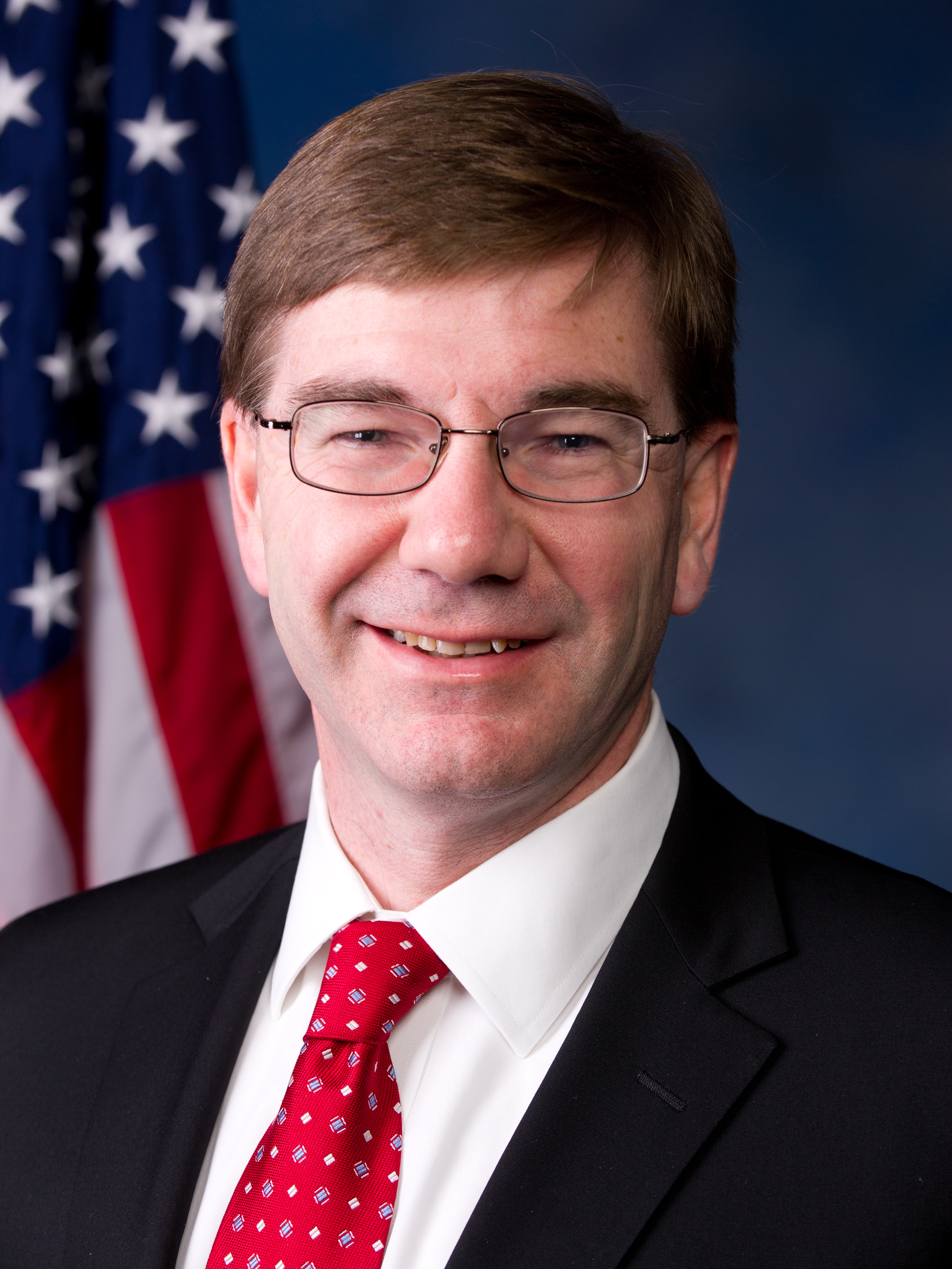

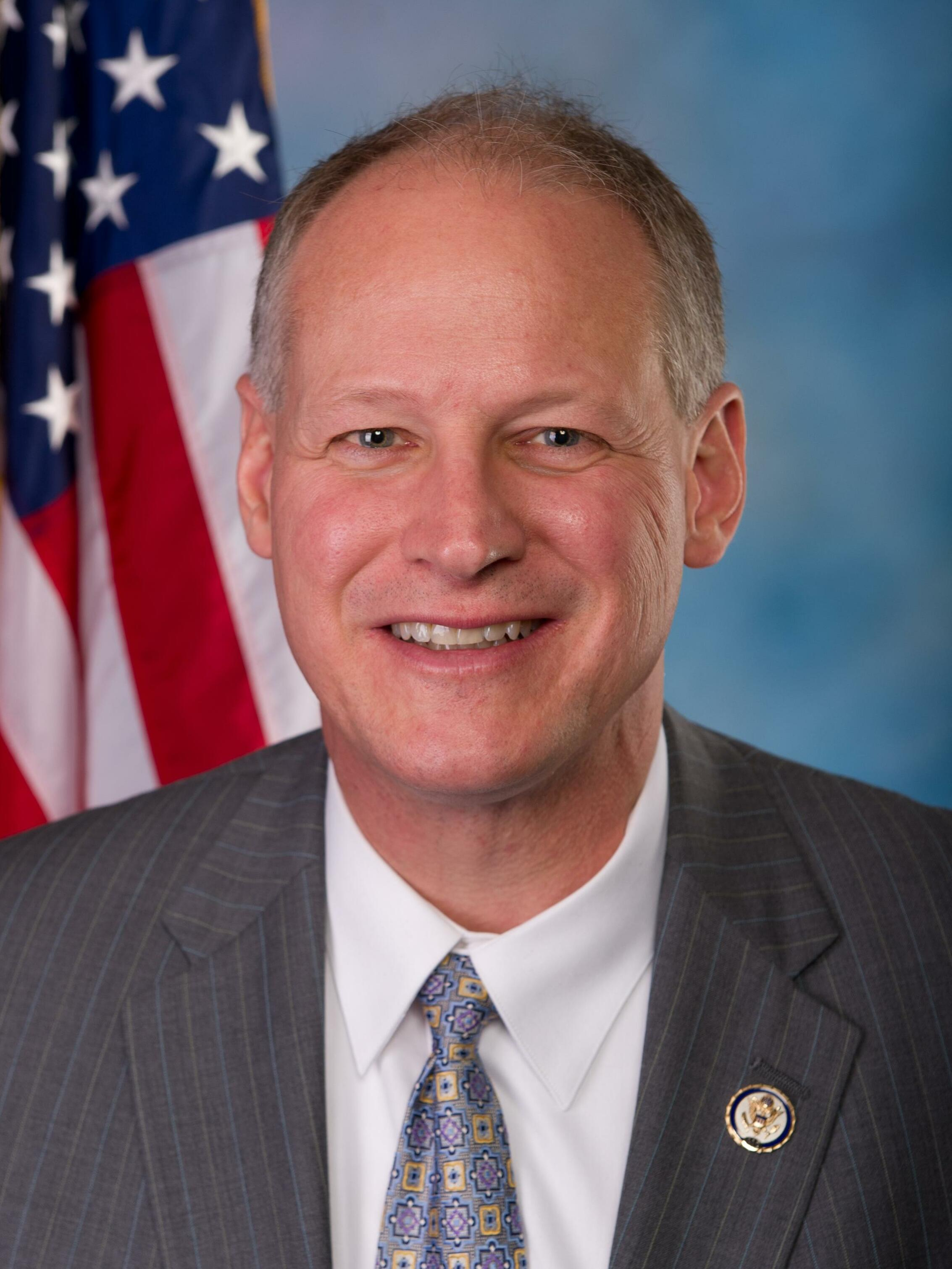
Nominee	Keith Rothfus	Mark Critz
Party	Republican	Democratic
Popular vote	175,352	163,589
Percentage	51.7%	48.3%
- County results Critz: 50–60% 60–70% Rothfus: 50–60% 60–70%
U.S. Representative before election
Jason Altmire
Democratic
Elected U.S. Representative
Keith Rothfus
Republican

Pennsylvania's 12th congressional district is located in southwestern Pennsylvania, and consists of all of Beaver County, and parts of Allegheny, Cambria, Lawrence, Somerset, and Westmoreland counties. Democrats Mark Critz, who had represented Pennsylvania's 12th congressional district since 2010; and Jason Altmire, who had represented Pennsylvania's 4th congressional district since 2007, both sought re-election in the new 12th district.

=== Democratic primary ===
==== Candidates ====
===== Nominee =====
- Mark Critz, incumbent U.S. representative

===== Eliminated in primary =====
- Jason Altmire, incumbent U.S. representative for Pennsylvania's 4th congressional district

==== Endorsements ====
Jason Altmire

U.S. representatives

- Joe Sestak, representative for Pennsylvania's 7th congressional district (2007–2011) and nominee for the Senate in 2010

Organizations

- Blue Dog Coalition

Newspapers

- Pittsburgh Post-Gazette
Mark Critz

U.S. executive branch officials

- Bill Clinton, former president of the United States

Labor unions

- AFL-CIO
- American Federation of State, County and Municipal Employees
- International Brotherhood of Teamsters
- Service Employees International Union
- United Steelworkers

Newspapers

- Pittsburgh Tribune-Review

==== Polling ====
Poll source	Date(s) administered	Sample size	Margin of error	Jason Altmire	Mark Critz	Undecided
Susquehanna Research and Polling	April 13–15, 2012	400	±4.9%	43%	39%	18%
Global Strategy Group (D-Critz)	March 22–25, 2012	400	±4.9%	45%	38%	17%
Anzalone Liszt Research (D-Altmire)	March 12–14, 2012	400	±4.9%	55%	31%	14%
Global Strategy Group (D-Critz)	February 2–5, 2012	400	±4.9%	47%	37%	16%
Anzalone Liszt Research (D-Altmire)	January 10–16, 2012	503	±4.4%	50%	34%	16%

==== Primary results ====
Primary results by county: Critz: 80–90%; >90%; Altmire: 50–60%; 60–70%

Democratic primary results
Party	Candidate	Votes	%
Democratic	Mark Critz (incumbent)	32,384	51.2
Democratic	Jason Altmire (incumbent)	30,895	48.8
Total votes		63,279	100.0

=== Republican primary ===
==== Candidates ====
===== Nominee =====
- Keith Rothfus, attorney and nominee for Pennsylvania's 4th congressional district in 2010

==== Declined ====
- Jim Christiana, state representative
- Mike Turzai, majority leader of the Pennsylvania House of Representatives

==== Primary results ====
Republican primary results
Party	Candidate	Votes	%
Republican	Keith Rothfus	44,360	100.0
Total votes		44,360	100.0

=== General election ===
==== Endorsements ====
Mark Critz (D)

U.S. executive branch officials

- Bill Clinton, former president of the United States

Labor unions

- AFL-CIO
- American Federation of State, County and Municipal Employees
- International Brotherhood of Boilermakers
- National Association of Letter Carriers
- National Education Association
- Service Employees International Union
- United Steelworkers

Organizations

- Alliance for Retired Americans
- Democratic Congressional Campaign Committee "Frontline" Program
- NRA Political Victory Fund

Newspapers

- Pittsburgh Post-Gazette
- The Tribune-Democrat
Keith Rothfus (R)

U.S. representatives

- Bill Shuster, representative for Pennsylvania's 10th congressional district (2011–present)

Organizations

- 60 Plus Association
- Campaign for Working Families
- Club for Growth
- Eagle Forum
- FreedomWorks
- Gun Owners of America
- National Republican Congressional Committee "Young Guns" Program
- National Right to Life Committee
- Tea Party Express
- United States Chamber of Commerce

Newspapers

- New Castle News

Individuals

- Pat Boone, entertainer
Did not endorse

Newspapers

- Pittsburgh Tribune-Review

==== Polling ====
Poll source	Date(s) administered	Sample size	Margin of error	Mark Critz (D)	Keith Rothfus (R)	Undecided
Susquehanna Research and Polling (R)	October 1–2, 2012	950	±3.2%	43%	45%	12%
Public Opinion Strategies (R-YG Action Fund)	September 30–October 1, 2012	400	±4.9%	40%	42%	16%
Anzalone Liszt Research (D-Critz)	September 23–25, 2012	400	±4.9%	52%	41%	7%
McLaughlin & Associates (R-Rothfus)	September 19–20, 2012	400	±4.9%	38%	38%	24%
Anzalone Liszt Research (D-Critz)	July 31–August 2, 2012	400	±4.9%	50%	40%	10%
Benenson Strategy (D-House Majority PAC)/SEIU)	July 9–11, 2012	400	±4.9%	44%	38%	18%
Global Strategy Group (D-Critz)	June 13–15, 2012	402	±4.9%	46%	36%	18%

==== Predictions ====
Source	Ranking	As of
The Cook Political Report	Tossup	November 5, 2012
Rothenberg	Tossup	November 2, 2012
Roll Call	Tossup	November 4, 2012
Sabato's Crystal Ball	Lean D	November 5, 2012
NY Times	Tossup	November 4, 2012
RCP	Tossup	November 4, 2012
The Hill	Tossup	November 4, 2012

==== Results ====
Pennsylvania's 12th congressional district, 2012
Party	Candidate	Votes	%
Republican	Keith Rothfus	175,352	51.7
Democratic	Mark Critz (incumbent)	163,589	48.3
Total votes		338,941	100.0
Republican gain from Democratic			

== District 13 ==
2012 Pennsylvania's 13th congressional district election
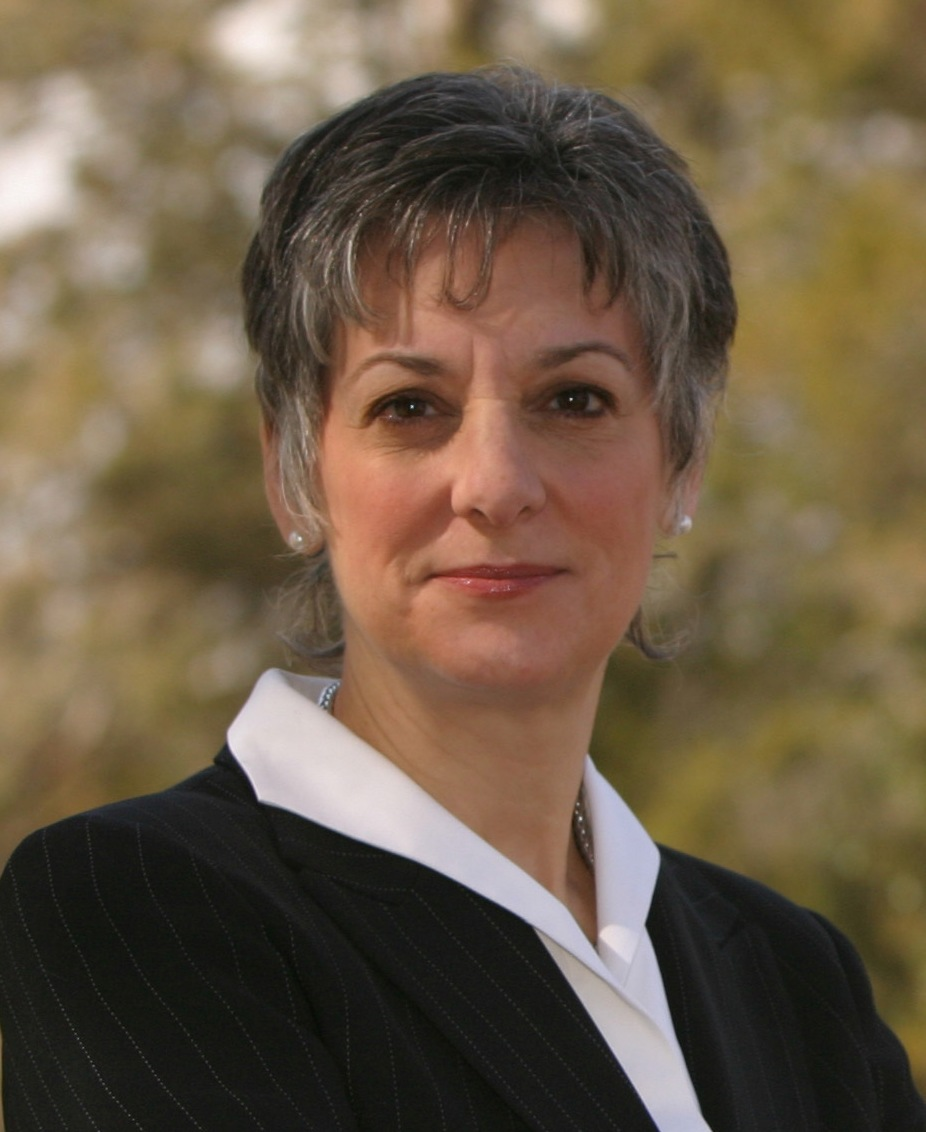

Nominee	Allyson Schwartz	Joseph Rooney
Party	Democratic	Republican
Popular vote	209,901	93,918
Percentage	69.1%	30.9%
- County results Schwartz: 60–70% 70–80%
U.S. representative before election
Allyson Schwartz
Democratic
Elected U.S. representative
Allyson Schwartz
Democratic

Pennsylvania's 13th congressional district is located in Southeastern Pennsylvania, covering eastern Montgomery County and Northeast Philadelphia. Democrat Allyson Schwartz, who had represented Pennsylvania's 13th congressional district since 2005, sought re-election.

=== Democratic primary ===
==== Candidates ====
===== Nominee =====
- Allyson Schwartz, incumbent U.S. representative

==== Declined ====
- Nathan Kleinman, member of the Occupy Philadelphia movement and field organizer for Barack Obama's 2008 presidential campaign

==== Endorsements ====
Nathan Kleinman

U.S. representatives

- Joe Sestak, representative for Pennsylvania's 7th congressional district (2007–2011) and nominee for the Senate in 2010

==== Primary results ====
Democratic primary results
Party	Candidate	Votes	%
Democratic	Allyson Schwartz (incumbent)	36,756	100.0
Total votes		36,756	100.0

=== Republican primary ===
==== Candidates ====
===== Nominee =====
- Joseph Rooney, pilot and Marine Corps veteran

==== Primary results ====
Republican primary results
Party	Candidate	Votes	%
Republican	Joseph James Rooney	21,644	100.0
Total votes		21,644	100.0

=== General election ===
==== Endorsements ====
Allyson Schwartz (D)

Labor unions

- AFL-CIO
- International Brotherhood of Boilermakers
- National Association of Letter Carriers
- National Education Association
- United Steelworkers

Organizations

- Environment America
- Equality Pennsylvania
- Feminist Majority
- Humane Society of the United States
- National Organization for Women
- Planned Parenthood Action Fund
- Sierra Club

Newspapers

- The Philadelphia Inquirer
Joe Rooney (R)

Organizations

- Eagle Forum
- National Right to Life Committee

==== Predictions ====
Source	Ranking	As of
The Cook Political Report	Safe D	November 5, 2012
Rothenberg	Safe D	November 2, 2012
Roll Call	Safe D	November 4, 2012
Sabato's Crystal Ball	Safe D	November 5, 2012
NY Times	Safe D	November 4, 2012
RCP	Safe D	November 4, 2012
The Hill	Safe D	November 4, 2012

==== Results ====
Pennsylvania's 13th congressional district, 2012
Party	Candidate	Votes	%
Democratic	Allyson Schwartz (incumbent)	209,901	69.1
Republican	Joe Rooney	93,918	30.9
Total votes		303,819	100.0
Democratic hold			

== District 14 ==
2012 Pennsylvania's 14th congressional district election
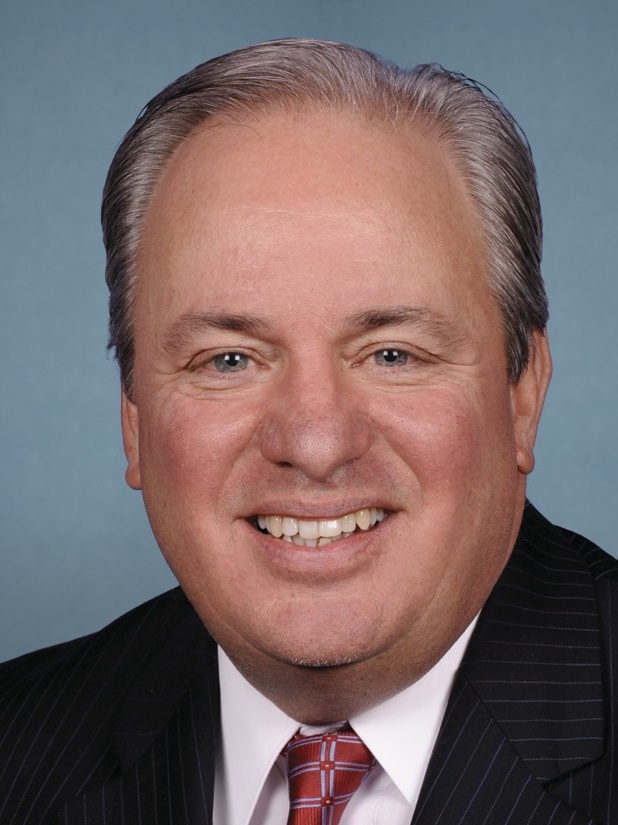

Nominee	Mike Doyle	Hans Lessmann
Party	Democratic	Republican
Popular vote	251,932	75,702
Percentage	76.9%	23.1%
- County results Doyle: 60–70% 70–80%
U.S. representative before election
Mike Doyle
Democratic
Elected U.S. representative
Mike Doyle
Democratic

Pennsylvania's 14th congressional district includes the entire city of Pittsburgh and parts of surrounding suburbs. Incumbent Democrat Mike Doyle defeated challenger Janis C. Brooks in the Democratic primary. He faced Republican Hans Lessmann in the general election.

=== Democratic primary ===
==== Candidates ====
===== Nominee =====
- Mike Doyle, incumbent U.S. representative

===== Eliminated in primary =====
- Janis C. Brooks, pastor and nonprofit founder

==== Endorsements ====
Mike Doyle

Newspapers

- Pittsburgh Post-Gazette

==== Primary results ====
Democratic primary results
Party	Candidate	Votes	%
Democratic	Michael F. Doyle (incumbent)	50,323	80.1
Democratic	Janis Brooks	12,484	19.9
Total votes		62,807	100.0

=== Republican primary ===
==== Candidates ====
===== Nominee =====
- Hans Lessmann, optometrist

==== Primary results ====
Republican primary results
Party	Candidate	Votes	%
Republican	Hans Lessmann	15,936	100.0
Total votes		15,936	100.0

=== General election ===
==== Endorsements ====
Mike Doyle (D)

Labor unions

- AFL-CIO
- International Brotherhood of Boilermakers
- National Association of Letter Carriers
- National Education Association
- United Steelworkers

Organizations

- Humane Society of the United States
- Sierra Club

Newspapers

- Pittsburgh Post-Gazette
Hans Lessmann (R)

Organizations

- Eagle Forum
- Tea Party Express

Newspapers

- Pittsburgh Tribune-Review

==== Predictions ====
Source	Ranking	As of
The Cook Political Report	Safe D	November 5, 2012
Rothenberg	Safe D	November 2, 2012
Roll Call	Safe D	November 4, 2012
Sabato's Crystal Ball	Safe D	November 5, 2012
NY Times	Safe D	November 4, 2012
RCP	Safe D	November 4, 2012
The Hill	Safe D	November 4, 2012

==== Results ====
Pennsylvania's 14th congressional district, 2012
Party	Candidate	Votes	%
Democratic	Mike Doyle (incumbent)	251,932	76.9
Republican	Hans Lessmann	75,702	23.1
Total votes		327,634	100.0
Democratic hold			

== District 15 ==
2012 Pennsylvania's 15th congressional district election
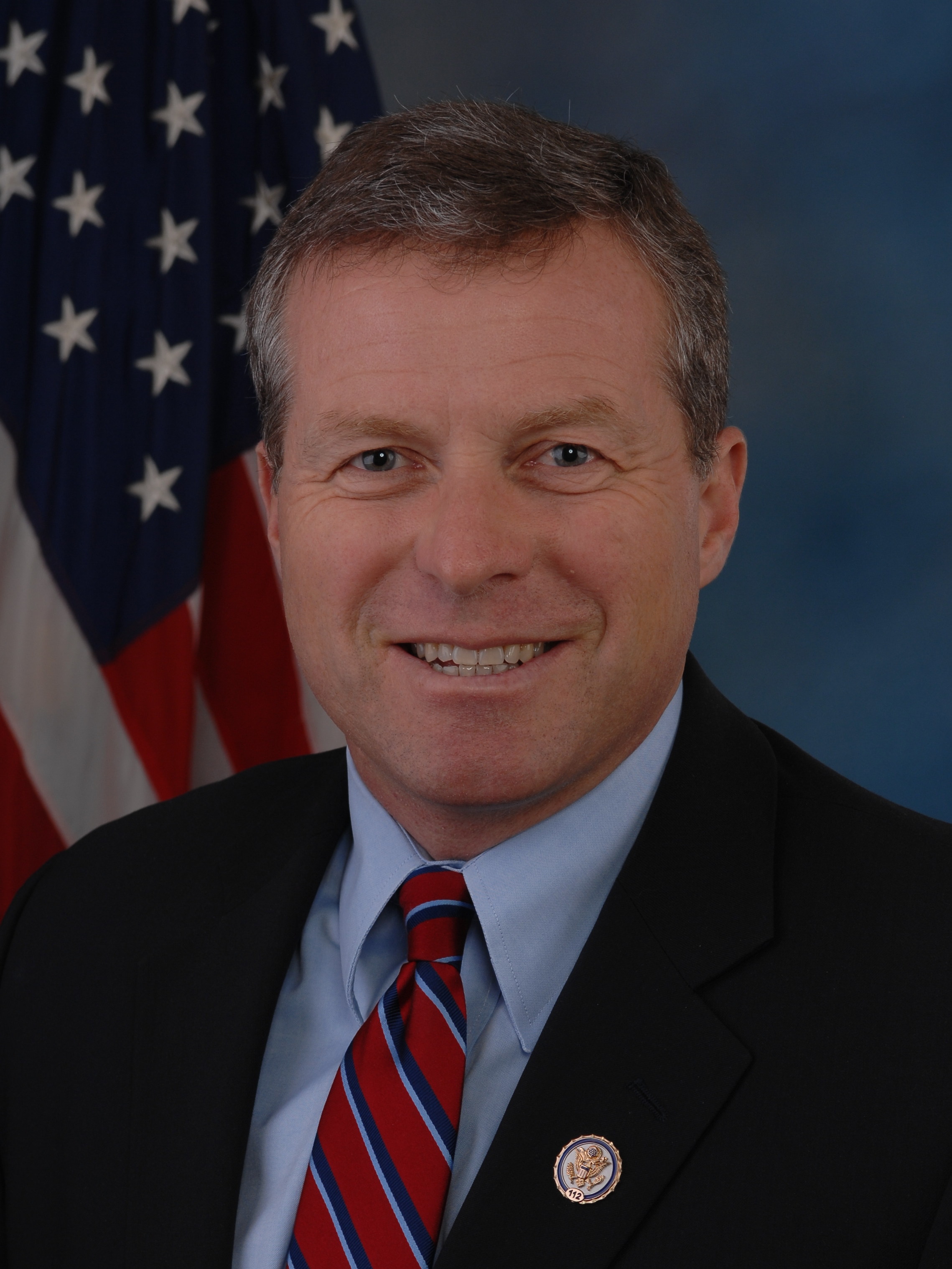

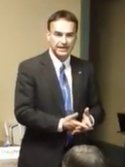
Nominee	Charlie Dent	Rick Daugherty
Party	Republican	Democratic
Popular vote	168,960	128,764
Percentage	56.8%	43.2%
- County results Dent: 50–60% 60–70%
U.S. Representative before election
Charlie Dent
Republican
Elected U.S. Representative
Charlie Dent
Republican

The 15th district is located in eastern Pennsylvania and stretches from the suburbs east of Harrisburg to communities east of Allentown to the New Jersey border. Counties located in the district include all of Lehigh County and parts of Berks County, Dauphin County, Lebanon County, and Northampton County. It had been represented by Republican Charlie Dent since 2005. He ran for re-election.

=== Republican primary ===
==== Candidates ====
===== Nominee =====
- Charlie Dent, incumbent U.S. representative

==== Primary results ====
Republican primary results
Party	Candidate	Votes	%
Republican	Charles Dent (incumbent)	38,651	100.0
Total votes		38,651	100.0

=== Democratic primary ===
==== Candidates ====
===== Nominee =====
- Rick Daugherty, chair of the Lehigh County Democratic Party

===== Eliminated in primary =====
- Jackson Eaton, Army veteran

==== Declined ====
- John Callahan, mayor of Bethlehem and nominee for this seat in 2010

==== Endorsements ====
Jackson Eaton

Organizations

- Equality Pennsylvania
- Stonewall Democrats

==== Primary results ====
Democratic primary results
Party	Candidate	Votes	%
Democratic	Rick Daugherty	14,623	58.8
Democratic	Jackson Eaton	10,265	41.2
Total votes		24,888	100.0

=== General election ===
==== Endorsements ====
Charlie Dent (R)

Labor unions

- National Association of Letter Carriers

Organizations

- Eagle Forum
- GOProud
- NRA Political Victory Fund
- United States Chamber of Commerce
Rick Daugherty (D)

Labor unions

- AFL-CIO
- International Brotherhood of Boilermakers

==== Predictions ====
Source	Ranking	As of
The Cook Political Report	Safe R	November 5, 2012
Rothenberg	Safe R	November 2, 2012
Roll Call	Safe R	November 4, 2012
Sabato's Crystal Ball	Safe R	November 5, 2012
NY Times	Safe R	November 4, 2012
RCP	Safe R	November 4, 2012
The Hill	Likely R	November 4, 2012

==== Results ====
Pennsylvania's 15th congressional district, 2012
Party	Candidate	Votes	%
Republican	Charlie Dent (incumbent)	168,960	56.8
Democratic	Rick Daugherty	128,764	43.2
Total votes		297,724	100.0
Republican hold			

== District 16 ==
2012 Pennsylvania's 16th congressional district election
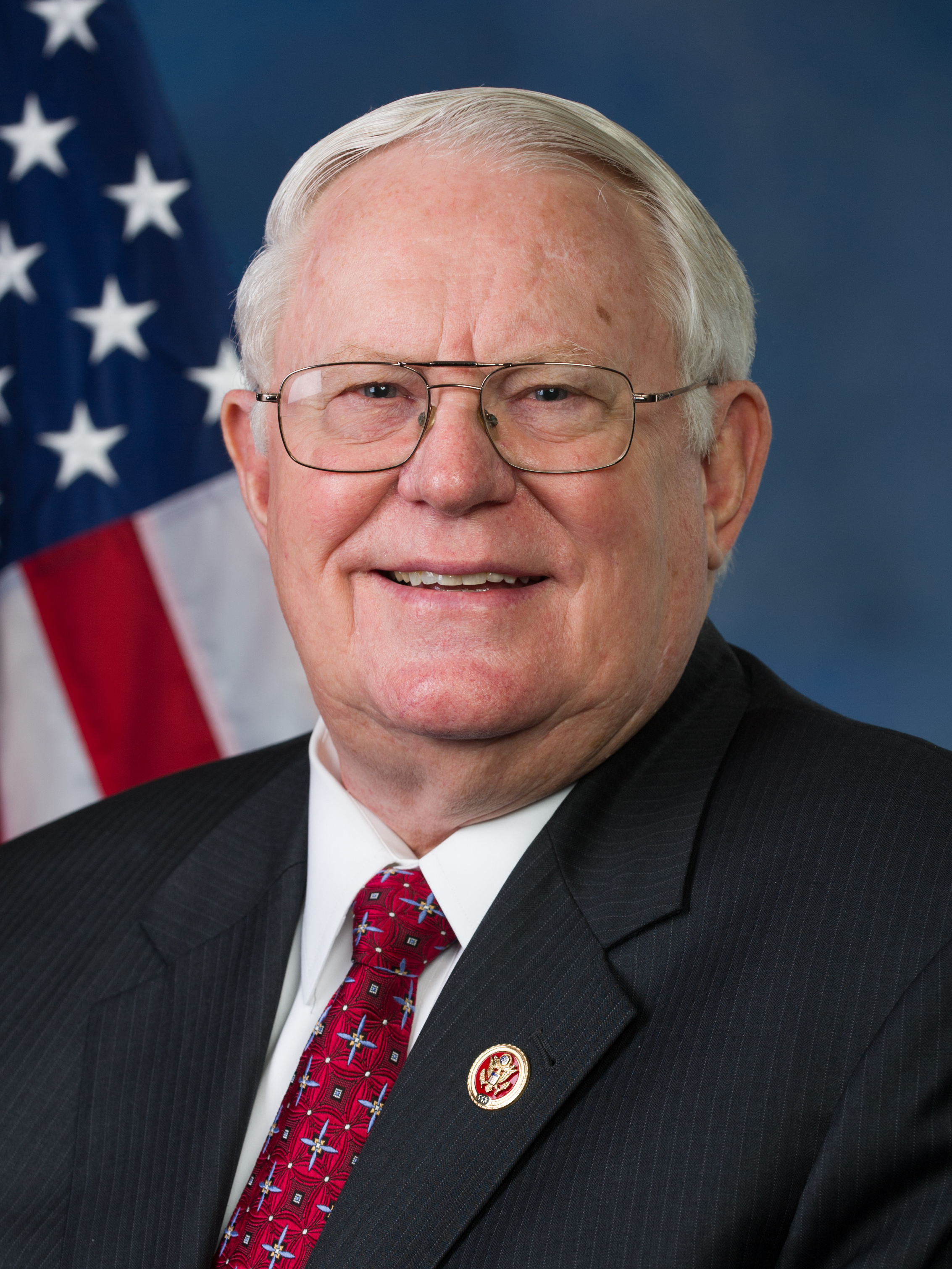

Nominee	Joe Pitts	Aryanna Strader
Party	Republican	Democratic
Popular vote	156,192	111,185
Percentage	54.8%	39.1%
- County results Pitts: 40–50% 60–70% Strader: 60–70%
U.S. representative before election
Joe Pitts
Republican
Elected U.S. representative
Joe Pitts
Republican

Pennsylvania's 16th congressional district is located in the southeastern part of the state, just west of Philadelphia. The district is composed of a large portion of southern Chester County, most of Lancaster County, and a sliver of Berks County, including the city of Reading. Incumbent Republican Joe Pitts, who had represented the district since 1997, faced Democrat Aryanna C. Strader. They each ran unopposed in their respective primaries.

=== Republican primary ===
==== Candidates ====
===== Nominee =====
- Joe Pitts, incumbent U.S. representative

==== Primary results ====
Republican primary results
Party	Candidate	Votes	%
Republican	Joseph R. Pitts (incumbent)	44,110	100.0
Total votes		44,110	100.0

=== Democratic primary ===
==== Candidates ====
===== Nominee =====
- Aryanna C. Strader, business owner

==== Primary results ====
Democratic primary results
Party	Candidate	Votes	%
Democratic	Aryanna C. Strader	15,839	100.0
Total votes		15,839	100.0

=== General election ===
==== Endorsements ====
Joe Pitts (R)

Organizations

- Campaign for Working Families
- Eagle Forum
- National Right to Life Committee
- NRA Political Victory Fund
- United States Chamber of Commerce
Aryanna Strader (D)

Labor unions

- AFL-CIO
- International Brotherhood of Boilermakers

Organizations

- Equality Pennsylvania
- National Organization for Women
- Pennsylvania Young Democrats
- Planned Parenthood Action Fund

==== Predictions ====
Source	Ranking	As of
The Cook Political Report	Safe R	November 5, 2012
Rothenberg	Safe R	November 2, 2012
Roll Call	Safe R	November 4, 2012
Sabato's Crystal Ball	Safe R	November 5, 2012
NY Times	Safe R	November 4, 2012
RCP	Safe R	November 4, 2012
The Hill	Safe R	November 4, 2012

==== Results ====
Pennsylvania's 16th congressional district, 2012
Party	Candidate	Votes	%
Republican	Joe Pitts (incumbent)	156,192	54.8
Democratic	Aryanna Strader	111,185	39.1
Independent	John Murphy	12,250	4.3
Independent	James Bednarski	5,154	1.8
Total votes		284,781	100.0
Republican hold			

== District 17 ==
2012 Pennsylvania's 17th congressional district election
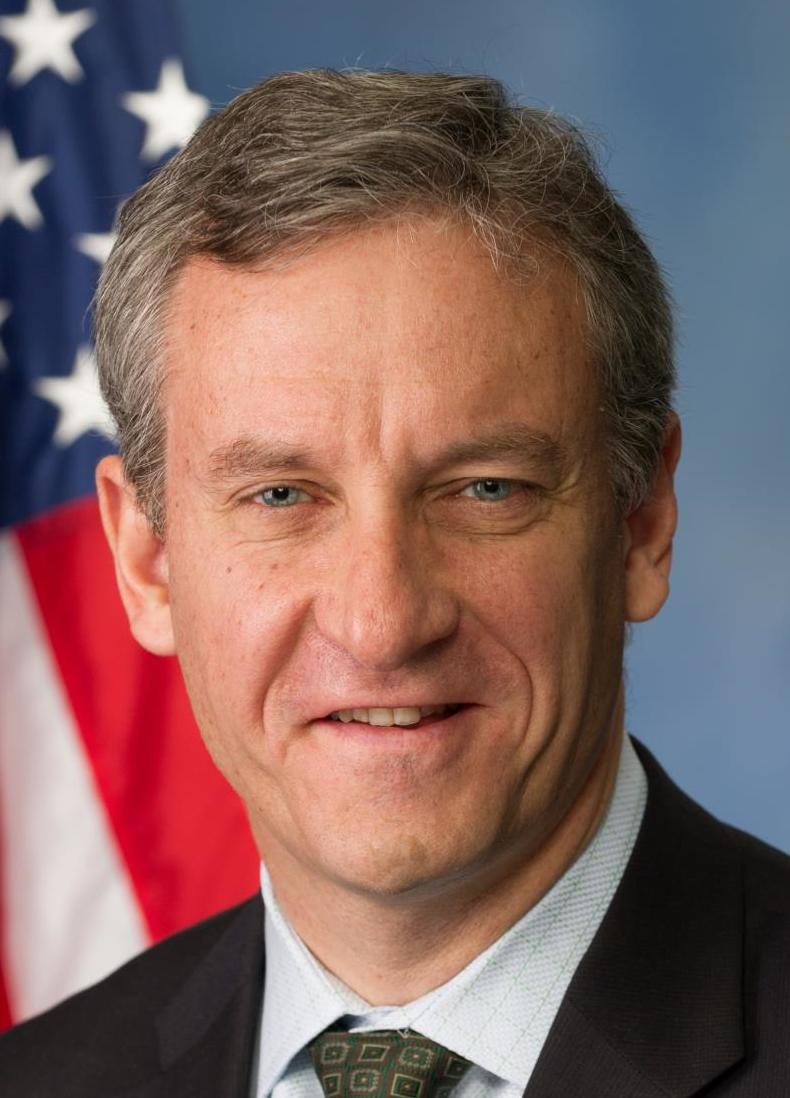

Nominee	Matt Cartwright	Laureen Cummings
Party	Democratic	Republican
Popular vote	161,393	106,208
Percentage	60.3%	39.7%
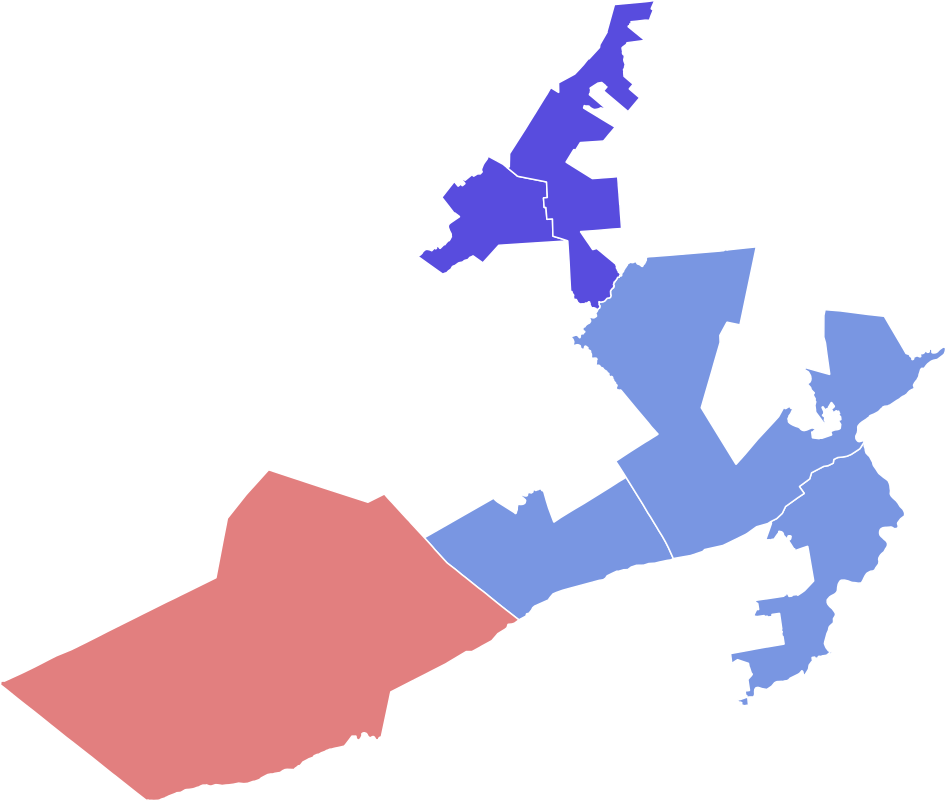
- County results Cartwright: 50–60% 70–80% Cummings: 50–60%
U.S. Representative before election
Tim Holden
Democratic
Elected U.S. Representative
Matt Cartwright
Democratic

Pennsylvania's 17th congressional district is located in the eastern part of the state. The district encompasses Schuylkill County and portions of Carbon, Monroe, Luzerne, Lackawanna, and Northampton counties. Democrat Tim Holden, who had represented Pennsylvania's 17th congressional district since 2003, ran for re-election. Pennsylvania Republicans, who controlled the redistricting process after the 2010 United States census, drew this district to be much more Democratic, taking in parts of Scranton and Wilkes Barre.

=== Democratic primary ===
Holden, a Blue Dog Democrat who had represented a very Republican district for 10 years, was considered vulnerable to a primary challenge due to the bluer hue of the new district. Holden was defeated in the Democratic primary by attorney Matt Cartwright, 57–43. Holden's opposition to the Patient Protection and Affordable Care Act and climate change legislation are believed to have contributed to his defeat by a more liberal opponent.

==== Candidates ====
===== Nominee =====
- Matt Cartwright, attorney

===== Eliminated in primary =====
- Tim Holden, incumbent U.S. representative

==== Declined ====
- Corey O'Brien, member of the Lackawanna County Board of Commissioners and candidate for Pennsylvania's 11th congressional district in 2010

==== Endorsements ====
Matt Cartwright

U.S. representatives

- Joe Sestak, representative for Pennsylvania's 7th congressional district (2007–2011) and nominee for the Senate in 2010
Tim Holden

U.S. senators

- Bob Casey Jr., U.S. senator from Pennsylvania (2007–present), 34th Treasurer of Pennsylvania (2005–2007), 49th Auditor General of Pennsylvania (1997–2005)

U.S. representatives

- Chris Carney, representative for Pennsylvania's 10th congressional district (2007–2011)
- Paul Kanjorski, representative for Pennsylvania's 11th congressional district (1985–2011)

Labor unions

- AFL-CIO
- National Education Association
- Service Employees International Union

Organizations

- Blue Dog Coalition
- Pennsylvania Young Democrats

==== Primary results ====
Results by county Cartwright: 60–70%; 70–80%; Holden: 50–60%; 60–70%; 80–90%

Democratic primary results
Party	Candidate	Votes	%
Democratic	Matt Cartwright	33,255	57.1
Democratic	Tim Holden (incumbent)	24,953	42.9
Total votes		58,208	100.0

=== Republican primary ===
==== Candidates ====
===== Nominee =====
- Laureen Cummings, Tea Party activist

==== Primary results ====
Republican primary results
Party	Candidate	Votes	%
Republican	Laureen A. Cummings	26,953	100.0
Total votes		26,953	100.0

=== General election ===
==== Endorsements ====
Matt Cartwright (D)

U.S. representatives

- Joe Sestak, representative for Pennsylvania's 7th congressional district (2007–2011) and nominee for the Senate in 2010

Labor unions

- AFL-CIO
- American Nurses Association
- International Brotherhood of Boilermakers
- National Association of Letter Carriers
- National Education Association

Organizations

- Democracy for America
- Democratic Congressional Campaign Committee "Majority Makers" Program
- Environment America
- Equality Pennsylvania
- League of Conservation Voters
- Sierra Club

Newspapers

- The Citizens' Voice

==== Predictions ====
Source	Ranking	As of
The Cook Political Report	Safe D	November 5, 2012
Rothenberg	Safe D	November 2, 2012
Roll Call	Safe D	November 4, 2012
Sabato's Crystal Ball	Safe D	November 5, 2012
NY Times	Safe D	November 4, 2012
RCP	Safe D	November 4, 2012
The Hill	Safe D	November 4, 2012

==== Results ====
Pennsylvania's 17th congressional district, 2012
Party	Candidate	Votes	%
Democratic	Matt Cartwright	161,393	60.3
Republican	Laureen Cummings	106,208	39.7
Total votes		267,601	100.0
Democratic hold			

== District 18 ==
2012 Pennsylvania's 18th congressional district election
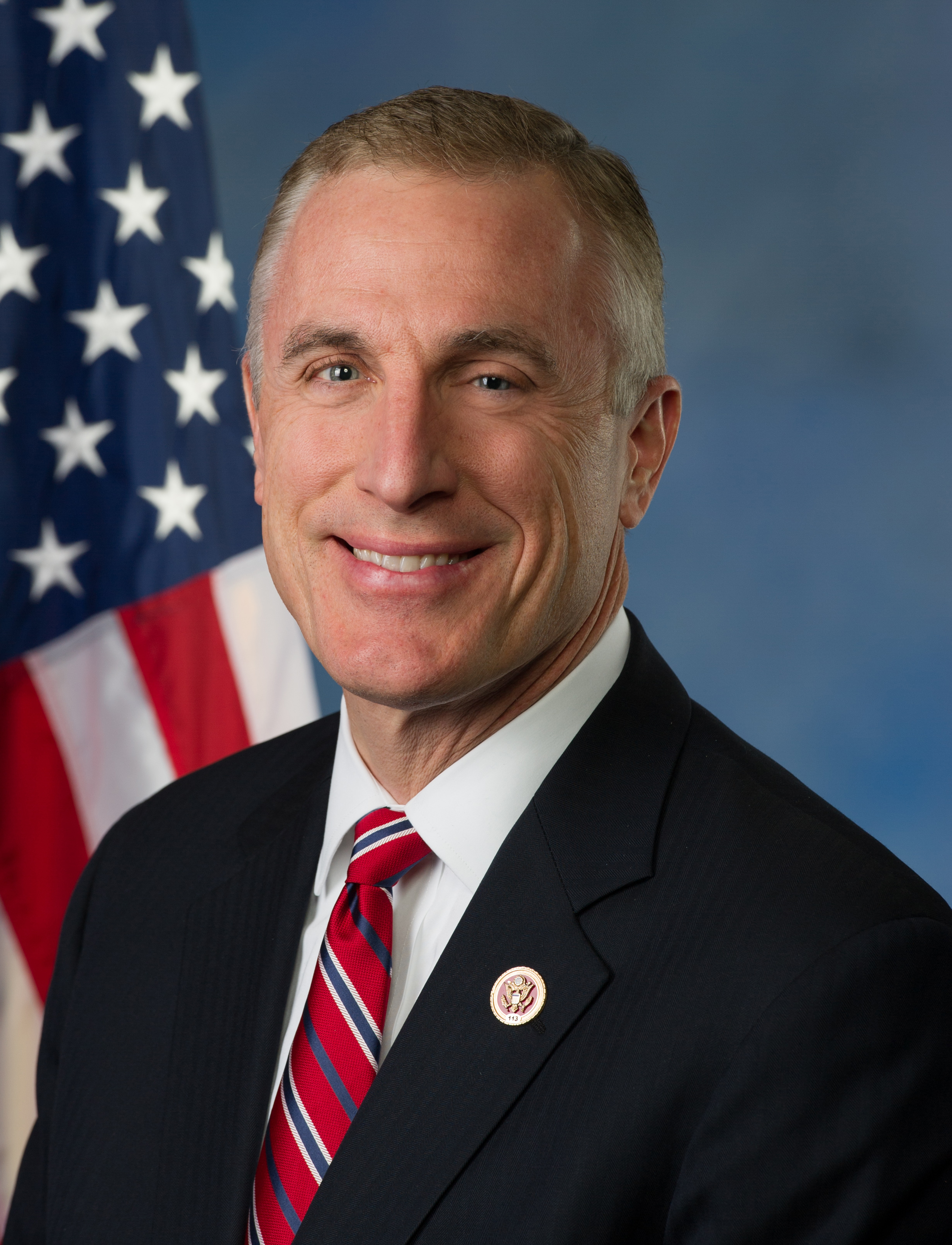

Nominee	Tim Murphy	Larry Maggi
Party	Republican	Democratic
Popular vote	216,727	122,146
Percentage	64.0%	36.0%
- County results Murphy: 50–60% 60–70%
U.S. Representative before election
Tim Murphy
Republican
Elected U.S. Representative
Tim Murphy
Republican

The 18th district is concentrated in the southern suburbs of Pittsburgh and includes parts of Greene County, Washington County, Allegheny County, and Westmoreland County. Republican Tim Murphy, who had represented the seat since 2003, sought re-election.

=== Republican primary ===
==== Candidates ====
===== Nominee =====
- Tim Murphy, incumbent U.S. representative

===== Eliminated in primary =====
- Evan Feinberg, former aide to U.S. Senators Tom Coburn and Rand Paul

==== Endorsements ====
Tim Murphy

Newspapers

- Pittsburgh Post-Gazette
Evan Feinberg

Organizations

- Republican Liberty Caucus

==== Primary results ====
Republican primary results
Party	Candidate	Votes	%
Republican	Timothy F. Murphy (incumbent)	32,854	63.4
Republican	Evan Feinberg	18,937	36.6
Total votes		51,791	100.0

=== Democratic primary ===
==== Candidates ====
===== Nominee =====
- Larry Maggi, Washington County Commissioner

==== Declined ====
- Ralph Kaiser, former state representative

==== Primary results ====
Democratic primary results
Party	Candidate	Votes	%
Democratic	Larry Maggi	39,096	100.0
Total votes		39,096	100.0

=== General election ===
==== Endorsements ====
Tim Murphy (R)

Labor unions

- International Brotherhood of Boilermakers

Organizations

- Eagle Forum
- National Right to Life Committee
- NRA Political Victory Fund
- United States Chamber of Commerce

Newspapers

- Observer–Reporter
- Pittsburgh Post-Gazette
Larry Maggi (D)

Labor unions

- United Steelworkers

Organizations

- Democratic Congressional Campaign Committee "Emerging Races" Program
Did not endorse

Newspapers

- Pittsburgh Tribune-Review

==== Predictions ====
Source	Ranking	As of
The Cook Political Report	Safe R	November 5, 2012
Rothenberg	Safe R	November 2, 2012
Roll Call	Safe R	November 4, 2012
Sabato's Crystal Ball	Safe R	November 5, 2012
NY Times	Safe R	November 4, 2012
RCP	Safe R	November 4, 2012
The Hill	Likely R	November 4, 2012

==== Results ====
Pennsylvania's 18th congressional district, 2012
Party	Candidate	Votes	%
Republican	Tim Murphy (incumbent)	216,727	64.0
Democratic	Larry Maggi	122,146	36.0
Total votes		338,873	100.0
Republican hold			
