= Pennsylvania LGBT Equality Caucus =

The Pennsylvania LGBT Equality Caucus is an organization of sitting members of the Pennsylvania General Assembly who are in favor of equality for lesbian, gay, bisexual and transgender Pennsylvanians. It was formed on December 19, 2011, with Representatives Dan Frankel and Babette Josephs serving as the first co-chairs, and is open to all sexual orientations and gender identities.

Ironically, unlike other LGBT-focused caucuses in other state or federal legislatures which are formed around openly LGBT sitting legislators (i.e., the LGBT Equality Caucus in the U.S. Congress), the Pennsylvania was formed without any openly LGBT sitting legislators, as none had yet been elected to political positions at the time of its formation.

The caucus now has two out members. They are Rep. Brian Sims (D – 182) and Rep. Mike Fleck (R – 81). Sims became the first openly gay man to be elected to the General Assembly in November 2012; Mike Fleck, an incumbent, came out after the election.

== Members ==
As of May 2013, 58 members of Pennsylvania General Assembly are members of the Pennsylvania LGBT Equality Caucus.

Pennsylvania House of Representatives:

1. Brendan F. Boyle (D–District 170)
2. Kevin J. Boyle (D–District 172)
3. Matthew Bradford (D–District 70)
4. Tim Briggs (D–District 149)
5. Vanessa L. Brown (D–District 190)
6. Michelle Brownlee (D–District 195)
7. James Clay (D–District 179)
8. Mark B. Cohen (D–District 202)
9. Dom Costa (D–District 21)
10. Paul Costa (D–District 34)
11. Angel Cruz (D–District 180)
12. Mary Jo Daley (D–District 148)
13. Tina Davis (D–District 141)
14. Madeleine Dean (D–District 153)
15. Pamela Delissio (D–District 194)
16. Frank Dermody (D–District 33) (Floor Leader)
17. Dwight E. Evans (D–District 203)
18. Florindo Fabrizio (D–District 2)
19. Mike Fleck (R–District 81)
20. Dan Frankel (D–District 23) (Co-chair) (Caucus Chairperson)
21. Edward Gainey (D–District 24)
22. Pat Harkins (D–District 1)
23. Jordan Harris (D–District 186)
24. William F. Keller (D–District 184)
25. Patty Kim (D–District 103)
26. Stephen Kinsey (D–District 201)
27. Thaddeus Kirkland (D–District 159)
28. Steven McCarter (D–District 154)
29. Michael McGeehan (D–District 173)
30. Daniel T. McNeill (D–District 133)
31. Erin Molchany (D–District 22)
32. Phyllis Mundy (D–District 120)
33. Tom Murt (R–District 152)
34. Michael H. O'Brien (D–District 175)
35. Mark Painter (D–District 146)
36. Cherelle Parker (D–District 200)
37. James R. Roebuck, Jr. (D–District 188)
38. L. Chris Ross (R–District 158)
39. Mark Rozzi (D–District 126)
40. Steve Santarsiero (D–District 31)
41. Michael Scholssberg (D–District 132)
42. Brian Sims (D–District 182)
43. Mike Sturla (D–District 96) (Policy Committee Chairman)
44. Jake Wheatley (D–District 19)
45. Rosita Youngblood (D–District 198)

Pennsylvania State Senate:

1. John Blake (D–District 22)
2. Larry Farnese (D–District 1)
3. Jim Ferlo (D–District 38)
4. Vincent Hughes (D–District 7) (Appropriations Committee Chairman)
5. Daylin Leach (D–District 17) (Co-chair)
6. Judy Schwank (D–District 11)
7. Sharif Street (D-District 3)
8. Christine Tartaglione (D–District 2) (Caucus Secretary)
9. Anthony H. Williams (D–District 8) (Whip)

== See also ==
- Equality Pennsylvania
- Pennsylvania Governor's Advisory Commission on LGBTQ Affairs
