= Pennsylvania Governor's Advisory Commission on LGBTQ Affairs =

The Pennsylvania Governor's Advisory Commission on LGBTQ Affairs is an advisory commission of the office of the governor of Pennsylvania dedicated to researching and advising the governor on matters of LGBTQ concern. It was originally established by Democratic governor Milton Shapp in 1976 by executive order as the Pennsylvania Governor's Council for Sexual Minorites. The order was maintained by his Republican successor Dick Thornburgh, but governors Bob Casey Sr. through Tom Corbett did not make any appointments to the council during their tenures. The commission was re-established by Governor Tom Wolf in August 2018 under its current name.

== List of chairs ==
- Anthony Silvestre (1976–1987)
- vacant (1987–2018)
- Anne Wakabayashi (2018–2023)
- Marie Rivera (2023–2024)
- Katharine Dalke (2025–2027)

=== Executive directors ===
- Todd Snovel (2018–2020)
- Rafael Álvarez Febo (2020–2022)
- Henry Sias (2023-2024)
- Ashleigh Strange (2024–present)

== See also ==
- Pennsylvania LGBT Equality Caucus
