= Equality Pennsylvania =

- U.S. State of Pennsylvania
- Founded: 1996
- Purpose: LGBT issues
- Locations: Harrisburg, Pennsylvania; Philadelphia, Pennsylvania; Pittsburgh, Pennsylvania; Wilkes-Barre, Pennsylvania
- Region served: Pennsylvania
- Formerly called: Center for Lesbian & Gay Civil Rights Equality Advocates Pennsylvania

Equality Pennsylvania is an organization which advocates throughout the state of Pennsylvania for LGBT rights. Equality Pennsylvania also attempts to "advance LGBT-friendly policy and legislative initiatives". The organization is a member of the Equality Federation.

== History ==
Equality Pennsylvania was founded by Andrew Park in 1996 in Philadelphia as the Center for Lesbian and Gay Civil Rights. Upon its founding, the Center provided legal services to members of the LGBTQ community in Philadelphia. The organization specifically provided assistance with HIV/AIDS discrimination and transgender name-change cases for the LGBT community. The organization eventually developed into Equality Advocates PA, which helped to advocate for LGBT rights along with its previous goal of providing legal representation to the LGBT community. Equality Advocates PA was instrumental in defeating constitutional amendments banning same-sex marriage in 2006 and 2008. In 2007, the organization also began to help draft LGBT non-discrimination legislation throughout the state. In 2009, Equality Advocates PA reorganized under the name of Equality Pennsylvania. Along with change of name, this reorganization saw the installation of a new board of directors and a new mission, which is to advocate for LGBT rights and LGBT legislation throughout Pennsylvania as a 501(c)(4) organization. The organization also reassigned its legal responsibilities to the Mazzoni Center so it could focus on advocating for equality for LGBT individuals. In 2010, the organization hired Ted Martin to become the Executive Director and opened an office in Harrisburg, Pennsylvania, to help expand the focus of the organization beyond Philadelphia and to allow for easier access to the General Assembly and the Governor. Following Martin's resignation in June 2017, the organization closed its Harrisburg office and established an even greater statewide network through the activation of regional chapters and with board members across the Commonwealth.

Equality Pennsylvania's related entities include:

- Equality Pennsylvania Education Fund (501(c)(3) educational charity)
- Equality Pennsylvania (501(c)(4) social welfare organization)
- Equality PA PAC (Political Action Committee)

== Activities ==
=== Endorsements ===
Equality Pennsylvania routinely endorses candidates seeking office both nationwide and in the state of Pennsylvania. On December 15, 2011, the organization endorsed President Barack Obama in his re-election campaign. Equality Pennsylvania also endorsed numerous candidates during the Pennsylvania State Primaries. These candidates include Brian Sims, whose victory in the Democratic Primary in the 182nd District made him the first openly gay member of the Pennsylvania General Assembly.

=== Political activities ===
Equality Pennsylvania, in its role as an advocacy group for LGBT rights, has engaged in numerous political activities. This includes negotiating LGBT non-discrimination legislation throughout the state. Currently, 28 local communities have adopted non-discrimination legislation. Equality Pennsylvania also was instrumental in the establishment of the LGBT Equality Caucus in the Pennsylvania General Assembly. The organization has also partnered with the Freedom to Marry and the Courage Campaign to attempt to convince Senator Bob Casey to support the Respect for Marriage Act.

=== Political Action Committee ===
Equality Pennsylvania is also administers the Equality Pennsylvania PAC, which is a political action committee that supports candidates throughout the state who the organization believes will help "secure and protect equality and opportunity for lesbian, gay, bisexual, and transgender Pennsylvanians and their families".

=== Equality Pennsylvania Educational Fund ===
The Equality Pennsylvania Educational Fund is the 501(c)(3) wing of the organization which looks to "provide educational programming on LGBT issues, conduct research to understand public opinions, mobilize a community of LGBT people and straight allies, and develop campaigns to build public support for fairness and equality".

=== See also ===
- Pennsylvania LGBT Equality Caucus
- LGBT rights in Pennsylvania
- Same-sex marriage in Pennsylvania
- List of LGBT rights organizations
