= Joseph DiSarro =

American political scientist and educator

- Born: September 20, 1948 (age 78)
- Education: Ph.D. West Virginia University M.A. Drew University B.A. Pershing University
- Occupations: Professor and chair in the Department of Political Science at Washington & Jefferson College
- Political party: Republican

Joseph DiSarro is an American professor and chair in the Department of Political Science at Washington & Jefferson College. In addition to his teaching duties, DiSarro is chair of the Legal Profession Committee and is the Pre-Law Advisor and Director of the college's Pre-Law Program. He has been pre-law advisor Washington & Jefferson College since 1978, guiding approximately 1,117 students to law school as of 2012. Ken Gormley, Dean of Duquesne University School of Law described DiSarro as "one of the most highly respected pre-law advisors in Pennsylvania."

He also serves as faculty advisor for the Pre-Legal Society and Presidents for Liberty student organizations. Several of his former students at Washington & Jefferson College have been served in the United States Congress, including Tom Rooney (FL-16) and Melissa Hart (PA-4).

DiSarro is originally from Westfield, New Jersey. He earned a B.A. from John J. Pershing College, an M.A. from Drew University in 1972, and a Ph.D. from West Virginia University in 1979. Politically, he describes himself as libertarian.

He has appeared on C-SPAN providing political analysis on 2010 Pennsylvania elections and on News Hour with Jim Lehrer analyzing the 2000 Presidential election in Pennsylvania. The subjects of his commentary has ranged from the national implications of the 2010 special election after the death John Murtha, the ability of Pennsylvania State Representative Bill DeWeese to run for re-election while under indictment, the politics of hydraulic fracturing, and the increasing clout of Western Pennsylvania in the Pennsylvania State Capitol following the 2010 elections and the rising influence of the Tea Party movement during the 2010 elections. His political analysis on the politics of Pennsylvania has been featured in publications as diverse as CNN, The Christian Science Monitor, The New York Times, and the English newspaper The Guardian.
