= Pennsylvania House of Representatives, District 72 =

American legislative district

Pennsylvania's 72nd State House of Representatives district
Representative
Frank Burns; D–East Taylor Township
- Population (2022): 64,105

The 72nd Pennsylvania House of Representatives District is located in west central Pennsylvania and has been represented by Frank Burns since 2009.

Despite having a state representative from the Democratic Party, the county that the district is in voted for Republican Donald Trump by nearly 40 percentage points in the concurrent 2024 presidential election.

== District profile ==
The 72nd District is located in Cambria County and includes the following areas:

- Blacklick Township
- Brownstown
- Cambria Township
- Conemaugh Township
- Croyle Township
- Daisytown
- Dale
- East Conemaugh
- East Taylor Township
- Ebensburg
- Ehrenfeld
- Franklin
- Jackson Township
- Johnstown
- Lorain
- Lower Yoder Township
- Middle Taylor Township
- Nanty Glo
- Southmont
- Summerhill
- Upper Yoder Township
- Vintondale
- West Taylor Township
- Westmont

== Representatives ==
Representative	Party	Years	District home	Note
Prior to 1969, seats were apportioned by county.
Edward McNally	Democrat	Elected to represent district in 1968		Died shortly after election to seat in 1968.
John Murtha	Democrat	1969 – 1974		Elected 20 May 1969 to fill vacancy. Elected to Congress
James O. Whelan, Jr.	Republican	1974 – 1976		Elected 21 May 1974.
William J. Stewart	Democrat	1977 – 1987		vacated seat in 1987.
Andrew Billow, Jr.	Democrat	1987 – 1992		Elected November 1987 to fill vacancy
Thomas F. Yewcic	Democrat	1993 – 2008	Conemaugh Township	
Frank Burns	Democrat	2009 – present	East Taylor Township	Incumbent

== Recent election results ==
PA House election, 2024: Pennsylvania House, District 72
Party	Candidate	Votes	%
Democratic	Frank Burns (incumbent)	16,825	51.33
Republican	Amy Bradley	15,955	48.67
Total votes		32,780	100.00
Democratic hold			

PA House election, 2022: Pennsylvania House, District 72
Party	Candidate	Votes	%
Democratic	Frank Burns (incumbent)	14,129	54.54
Republican	Renae Billow	11,775	45.46
Total votes		25,904	100.00
Democratic hold			

PA House election, 2020: Pennsylvania House, District 72
Party	Candidate	Votes	%
Democratic	Frank Burns (incumbent)	16,886	52.71
Republican	Howard D. Terndrup	15,150	47.29
Total votes		32,036	100.00
Democratic hold			

PA House election, 2018: Pennsylvania House, District 72
Party	Candidate	Votes	%
Democratic	Frank Burns (incumbent)	11,819	52.42
Republican	Gerald Carnicella	10,726	47.58
Total votes		22,545	100.00
Democratic hold			

PA House election, 2016: Pennsylvania House, District 72
Party	Candidate	Votes	%
Democratic	Frank Burns (incumbent)	16,361	57.55
Republican	Cecilia Houser	12,066	42.45
Total votes		28,427	100.00
Democratic hold			

PA House election, 2014: Pennsylvania House, District 72
Party	Candidate	Votes	%
Democratic	Frank Burns (incumbent)	11,354	62.57
Republican	Philip Rice	6,792	37.43
Total votes		18,146	100.00
Democratic hold			

PA House election, 2012: Pennsylvania House, District 72
Party	Candidate	Votes	%
Democratic	Frank Burns (incumbent)	Unopposed	
Total votes		21,024	100.00
Democratic hold			

PA House election, 2010: Pennsylvania House, District 72
Party	Candidate	Votes	%
Democratic	Frank Burns (incumbent)	Unopposed	
Total votes		18,831	100.00
Democratic hold			
