= 2010 Pennsylvania elections =

- November 2, 2010

Elections were held in Pennsylvania on November 2, 2010. These included elections for U.S. Senate, Governor, Pennsylvania Senate, and Pennsylvania House of Representatives.

== Federal ==
=== United States Senate ===
Former Republican, now Democratic, Senator Arlen Specter was defeated in a primary election to Joe Sestak, who then faced Republican Pat Toomey. In a narrow race, Pat Toomey was victorious over Sestak.

=== United States House ===
==== Twelfth District special election ====
A special election was held on May 18, 2010 to fill the seat left vacant by the death of Democratic U.S. Representative John Murtha. On March 8, 2010, the Pennsylvania Democratic Party's Executive Committee nominated Mark Critz, Murtha's former district director. On March 11, a convention of Republicans from the 12th district nominated businessman Tim Burns. The Democrats held the seat in the special election, with Critz defeating Burns. Both would face each other again in November's general election, with Critz winning again.

==== General election ====
All 19 seats will face an election. Pennsylvania is expected to lose one congressional seat after the 2010 census.

== State ==
=== Governor ===
A new governor was elected(incumbent Governor Ed Rendell (D) is term limited), Tom Corbett, the Republican, won the general election with 55% of the vote against the Democrat, Dan Onorato, who carried 45% of the final vote.

=== Judicial positions ===
Pennsylvania holds judicial elections in odd-numbered years.

- Pennsylvania judicial elections, 2010 at Judgepedia

=== Ballot measures ===
At least one statewide ballot question has been proposed for the November 2 ballot:
1. Call for a Constitutional Convention

- Pennsylvania 2010 ballot measures at Ballotpedia

== See also ==
- Elections in Pennsylvania
