= Yewcic =

Yewcic is a surname. Notable people with the surname include:

- Thomas F. Yewcic (born 1954), American politician
- Tom Yewcic (1932–2020), American football and baseball player
