= 2006 House Democratic Caucus leadership election =

A leadership election was held by the United States House of Representatives Democratic Caucus on November 17, 2006. The election determined who would be nominated by the caucus for Speaker of the House as well as who would occupy other leadership positions within the House Democratic Caucus in the 110th United States Congress. The following positions were nominated or elected on November 29: Speaker of the U.S. House of Representatives, House Majority Leader, House Majority Whip, House Assistant Majority Leader, Democratic Caucus Chair, and Democratic Caucus vice-Chair.

== Nominee for Speaker ==
=== Candidates ===
- Rep. Nancy Pelosi (D-CA), House Minority Leader, later became Speaker

== Democratic Majority Leader ==
=== Candidates ===
- Rep. Steny Hoyer (D-MD), House Minority Whip, later became Majority Leader
- Rep. John Murtha (D-PA)

=== Results ===
Democratic Caucus Majority Leader election, 2006
Party	Candidate	Votes	%
Democratic	Steny Hoyer	149	63.4%
Democratic	John Murtha	86	36.6%
Total votes		235	100%

== Democratic Majority Whip ==
=== Candidates ===
- Rep. Jim Clyburn (D-SC), House Caucus Chair, later became Majority Whip

=== Withdrew ===
- Rep. Rahm Emanuel (D-IL), Chair of the Democratic Congressional Campaign Committee (withdrew to run for Caucus Chair)

=== Results ===
Democratic Caucus Majority Whip election, 2006
Party	Candidate	Votes	%
Democratic	Jim Clyburn	Acclamation	100%
Democratic	Absent	1	0.42%
Total votes		239	100%

== Democratic Caucus Chair ==
=== Candidates ===
- Rep. Rahm Emanuel (D-IL), DCCC Chair

=== Results ===
Democratic Caucus Chair election, 2006
Party	Candidate	Votes	%
Democratic	Rahm Emanuel	Acclamation	100%
Total votes		239	100%

== Democratic Caucus Vice-Chair ==
=== Candidates ===
- Rep. John Larson (D-CT), Incumbent Vice-Chair

=== Results ===
Democratic Caucus Vice-Chair election, 2006
Party	Candidate	Votes	%
Democratic	John Larson	Acclamation	100%
Total votes		239	100%
