= Keith Rothfus =

American politician (born 1962)

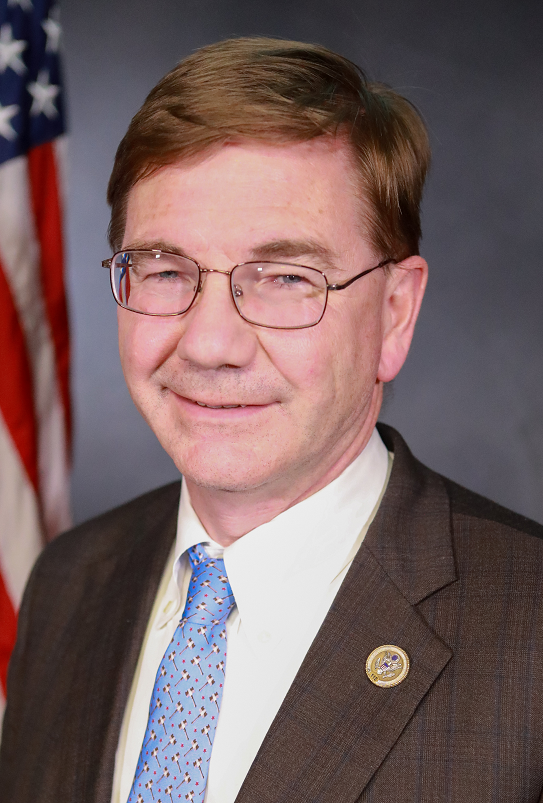

Member of the U.S. House of Representatives from Pennsylvania's 12th district
- In office January 3, 2013 – January 3, 2019
- Preceded by: Mark Critz
- Succeeded by: Conor Lamb (redistricted)

Personal details
- Born: Keith James Rothfus; April 25, 1962 (age 64) Endicott, New York, U.S.
- Party: Republican
- Spouse: Elsie Rothfus
- Children: 6
- Education: Buffalo State College (BS); University of Notre Dame (JD)

Keith James Rothfus /ˈrɒθfəs/ (born April 25, 1962) is an American lawyer and politician who served as the U.S. representative for Pennsylvania's 12th congressional district from 2013 to 2019. He succeeded Democratic Representative Mark Critz, whom he defeated in the 2012 election. Prior to serving in Congress, he worked as an attorney. After new congressional district maps were released by the Pennsylvania Supreme Court in February 2018, Rothfus became a candidate in Pennsylvania's 17th congressional district, where he was defeated for re-election by the incumbent from the 18th district, Democrat Conor Lamb.

== Early life and education ==
Rothfus was born in 1962 in Endicott, New York. He graduated from West Seneca West Senior High School in 1980. He graduated from the State University of New York College at Buffalo with a bachelor's degree in information systems. He later earned his Juris Doctor from the University of Notre Dame Law School in 1994.

== Law career ==
For most of his adult life, Rothfus has been a corporate attorney. He was employed by the United States Department of Homeland Security from 2006 to 2007. He has also been a member of the Edgeworth, Pennsylvania zoning board. He serves on the board of directors of the Veterans Leadership Program of Western Pennsylvania.

== U.S. House of Representatives ==
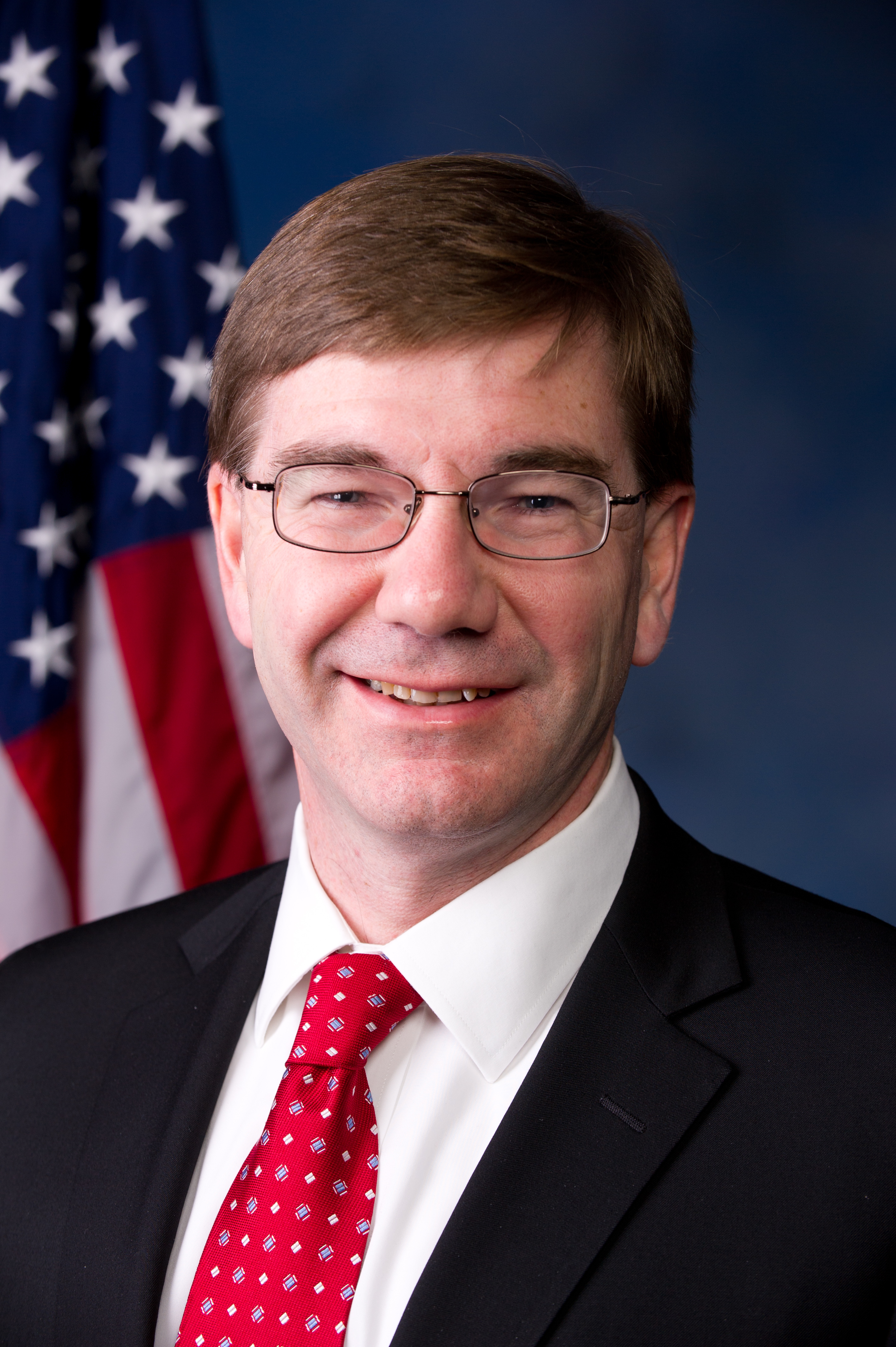
Rothfus during the 113th Congress

=== Elections ===
==== 2010 ====
Rothfus decided to run for Congress in Pennsylvania's 4th congressional district. In the Republican primary, he defeated U.S. Attorney Mary Beth Buchanan 65%–35%. Rothfus challenged Democratic U.S. Congressman Jason Altmire, losing 51%–49%.

==== 2012 ====
After redistricting, most of the 4th District was merged with the Johnstown-based Pennsylvania's 12th congressional district. Rothfus won the Republican primary unopposed. In the general election, he faced incumbent Democrat Mark Critz, who had defeated incumbent Jason Altmire in the Democratic primary. Rothfus led Critz in fundraising for the second half of 2012. It was a highly competitive election, with outside groups spending nearly $10 million.

Rothfus defeated Critz 52%–48%. Although Critz had retained the bulk of his former territory, he could not overcome the significantly redder hue of the redrawn district. Rothfus took office when the 113th Congress convened on January 3, 2013.

==== 2014 ====
Rothfus sought a second term in the U.S. House in 2014. He was re-nominated in the May 20 Republican primary and faced Democratic nominee Erin McClelland in the general election. He defeated McClelland 59%–41%, winning a second term.

==== 2016 ====
Rothfus sought a third term in the U.S. House in 2016. He again faced Democratic candidate Erin McClelland in the general election. He defeated McClelland 62%–38%, winning a third term.

==== 2018 ====
For his first three terms, Rothfus represented a district stretching from the northwestern suburbs of Pittsburgh to Johnstown. After the Pennsylvania Supreme Court threw out the old congressional map as unconstitutional and replaced it with a map of its own, Rothfus' district was renumbered as the 17th District. It lost its eastern portion, including the area around Johnstown, and reconfigured as a more compact district in the northern and western suburbs of Pittsburgh. In the process, it lost its last connection to John Murtha, who had represented the 12th from 1972 until his death in 2010.

Democrat Conor Lamb, who won a special election for the neighboring 18th District, had his home drawn into the new 17th and filed to run for a full term there on March 20. On paper, the new 17th was far less Republican than its predecessor; President Trump carried the old 12th by 20 points, but would have carried the new 17th by just 2.5 points. In the November 2018 general election, Rothfus was defeated by Lamb. Lamb won 56% of the vote to Rothfus's 44%.

The political action committee America First Policies bought advertisements in support of Rothfus's campaign.

=== Committee assignments ===
- Committee on Financial Services
  - Subcommittee on Financial Institutions and Consumer Credit
  - Subcommittee on Oversight and Investigations
- United States House Judiciary Committee

=== Caucus memberships ===
- Friends of Wales Caucus

== Political positions ==
Rothfus, a conservative, was a member of the Republican Study Committee.

=== Finance ===
On July 20, 2017, Rothfus introduced H.J.Res.111, which nullifies a rule submitted by the Consumer Financial Protection Bureau.

=== Healthcare ===
In early 2017, efforts were made to repeal and replace the Affordable Care Act. Approximately 130 of Rothfus's constituents requested a town hall to discuss their concerns about removed/reduced health coverage. Frustrated citizens sponsored and invited Rothfus to a town hall; he declined. Some of Rothfus's constituents reportedly started a PAC to motivate him to meet with them. On June 3, activists and constituents purportedly frustrated with Rothfus's refusal to host a town hall interrupted a Chamber of Commerce meeting that Rothfus was attending.

=== Human trafficking ===
Along with Congressman Juan Vargas (D-CA), Rothfus introduced the "Fight Illicit Networks and Detect Trafficking Act" (or the FIND Trafficking Act), H.R. 6069. On July 17, 2018, the House passed the S.488, the JOBS and Investor Confidence Act of 2018, which contained the text of the FIND Trafficking Act. The FIND Trafficking Act directs the Comptroller of the Currency to study how virtual currencies can facilitate human trafficking.

=== Insurance regulation ===
On September 12, 2018, a bill that Rothfus had introduced, the State Insurance Regulation Preservation Act (H.R. 5059), passed in the U.S. House of Representatives. The legislation would tailor the supervision of the Federal Reserve over holding companies that own thrifts (savings and loans banks). The bill streamlines regulator's approach to insurance savings and loan holding companies (ISLHCs) by enacting several reforms.

=== LGBT rights ===
In 2015, he signed onto a resolution which would amend the U.S. Constitution so that only marriages between men and women are legal. Rothfus has a 0 rating from the Human Rights Campaign, an LGBT rights advocacy group.

=== Natural disasters ===
In 2013, Rothfus voted against a bill to provide disaster relief funding to victims of Hurricane Sandy. Referring to the bill's funding offsets for the National Flood Insurance Program, he said it was "irresponsible to raise an insolvent program's debt ceiling without making reforms."

=== Refugee crisis ===
In January 2017, Rothfus issued a statement in support of President Trump's executive order on refugees.

In May 2017, Rothfus voted to repeal and replace the Affordable Care Act, including provisions to defund Planned Parenthood. The bill included an exemption for Congress that was later removed, and the MacArthur amendment, which allowed states to opt out of covering preexisting conditions.

== Personal life ==
Rothfus resided with his wife, Elsie, and their six children in Sewickley, Pennsylvania in 2012. He is a survivor of appendix cancer.

He and his family attended St. James Catholic Church in Sewickley.

== Electoral history ==
2010 United States House of Representatives elections in Pennsylvania
Party	Candidate	Votes	%
Democratic	Jason Altmire (Incumbent)	120,827	50.81%
Republican	Keith Rothfus	116,958	49.19%
Democratic hold			

Pennsylvania's 12th congressional district, 2012
Party	Candidate	Votes	%
Republican	Keith Rothfus	175,352	51.7
Democratic	Mark Critz (incumbent)	163,589	48.3
Total votes		338,941	100.0
Republican gain from Democratic			

Pennsylvania's 12th congressional district, 2014
Party	Candidate	Votes	%
Republican	Keith Rothfus (incumbent)	127,993	59.3
Democratic	Erin McClelland	87,928	40.7
Total votes		215,921	100.0
Republican hold			

Pennsylvania's 12th congressional district, 2016
Party	Candidate	Votes	%
Republican	Keith Rothfus (incumbent)	221,851	61.8
Democratic	Erin Mcclelland	137,353	38.2
Total votes		359,204	100.0
Republican hold			

Pennsylvania's 17th congressional district, 2018
Party	Candidate	Votes	%
Democratic	Conor Lamb (incumbent)	183,162	56.3
Republican	Keith Rothfus (incumbent)	142,417	43.7
Total votes		325,579	100.0
Democratic gain from Republican			

U.S. House of Representatives
Preceded by Mark Critz	Member of the U.S. House of Representatives from Pennsylvania's 12th congressional district 2013–2019	Succeeded by Tom Marino
U.S. order of precedence (ceremonial)
Preceded by Pat Meehan as Former U.S. Representative	Order of precedence of the United States as Former U.S. Representative	Succeeded by Susan Wild as Former U.S. Representative
