= Conemaugh =

Conemaugh may refer to the following locations in Pennsylvania:

- Conemaugh Township, Cambria County, Pennsylvania
  - East Conemaugh, Pennsylvania, a borough within the township
- Conemaugh Township, Indiana County, Pennsylvania
- Conemaugh Township, Somerset County, Pennsylvania
- Conemaugh River, a tributary of the Kiskiminetas River
  - Little Conemaugh River, a tributary of the Conemaugh River
- Lake Conemaugh
