= Edward McNally =

American politician

Member-elect^{[a]} of the Pennsylvania House of Representatives from the 72nd district
- In office November 5, 1968 – November 21, 1968
- Preceded by: District Created
- Succeeded by: John Murtha

Member of the Pennsylvania House of Representatives from the Cambria County district
- In office January 3, 1961 – November 21, 1968

Personal details
- Born: January 2, 1900 Pittsburgh, Pennsylvania
- Died: November 21, 1968 (aged 68) Pittsburgh, Pennsylvania
- Party: Democratic
- Spouse: Clara Hoffman McNally
- Children: Sally McNally
- Education: Carnegie-Mellon University
- Occupation: Businessman
- a. McNally was elected to represent the 72nd district in November 1968. However, he died shortly after his election, and thus was unable to be sworn-in as representative for the district on January 7, 1969.

Edward W. McNally (January 2, 1900 – November 21, 1968) was an American politician from Cambria County, Pennsylvania. A member of the Democratic Party, McNally served in the Pennsylvania House of Representatives from 1961 until his death in 1968.

== Professional career ==
After graduating from Carnegie Institute of Technology (now Carnegie-Mellon University) in Pittsburgh, McNally served in a variety of managerial positions. He served as president and treasurer of McNally Tire and Rubber Company, and was a past director of Johnstown Hockey Company.

== Political career and death ==
McNally originally represented Cambria County in the State House (by holding one of the county's allotted at-large seats). While serving in the House, he sat on both the Liquor Control and Highway Committees.

Following the constitutional changes of 1968, which reorganized House seats into numbered districts, McNally was elected to represent the new 72nd District. However, he died on November 21, 1968, sixteen days after his election to the seat, following a heart attack. The ensuing special election for the seat was won by Democrat John Murtha.

== Personal life ==
McNally was married to Clara Hoffman, and had one daughter, Sally.
