= Thomas F. Yewcic =

American politician (born 1954)

Member of the Pennsylvania House of Representatives from the 72nd district
- In office January 5, 1993 – November 30, 2008
- Preceded by: Andrew Billow, Jr.
- Succeeded by: Frank Burns

Personal details
- Born: September 30, 1954 (age 72) East Conemaugh, Pennsylvania
- Party: Democratic
- Spouse: Jennifer Yewcic
- Children: 2 children
- Education: University of Pittsburgh

Thomas F. Yewcic (born September 30, 1954) was a Democratic member of the Pennsylvania House of Representatives, representing the 72nd District from 1993 until 2008. He and his wife live in Jackson Township and have 2 children. He retired prior to the 2008 election and was succeeded by Democrat Frank Burns.
