= Frank Burns (Pennsylvania politician) =

American politician

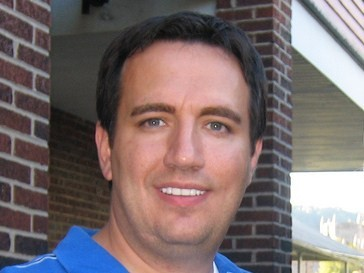

Member of the Pennsylvania House of Representatives from the 72nd district
- Incumbent
- Assumed office January 6, 2009
- Preceded by: Thomas F. Yewcic

Personal details
- Born: October 21, 1975 (age 50) Johnstown, Pennsylvania, U.S.
- Party: Democratic
- Education: BA, Business Management, University of Pittsburgh at Johnstown

Frank Burns (born October 21, 1975) is an American politician and Democratic member of the Pennsylvania House of Representatives. He represents the 72nd District, located in southwestern Cambria County.

== Biography ==
Before being elected as a state representative, Burns served as a township supervisor for East Taylor Township and as a Cambria County representative to the Pennsylvania Democratic State Committee.

Burns currently sits on the Consumer Affairs, Professional Licensure, Tourism & Recreational Development, and Veterans Affairs & Emergency Preparedness committees.

Burns is considered a conservative Democrat, opposing abortion rights, LGBTQ protections, and reducing access to firearms, but also supporting economic populism and labor rights. Despite being narrowly reelected in 2024, over Republican Amy Bradley, the county his district is in went to Donald Trump by 40 percentage points in the concurrent 2024 United States presidential election.

== Election History ==
Pennsylvania's House of Representatives 72nd District Democratic Primary, 2008
Party	Candidate	Votes	%
Democratic	Frank Burns	2,400	28.94
Democratic	Nick Molnar	1,718	20.72
Democratic	David Gehlman	1,300	15.68
Democratic	Dave Kuhar	952	11.48
Democratic	James Lamont	897	10.82
Democratic	Stephen Yesenosky	582	7.02
Democratic	Jared Lambie	444	5.35

Pennsylvania's House of Representatives 72nd District, 2008
Party	Candidate	Votes	%
Democratic	Frank Burns	8,636	55.30
Republican	Chris Voccio	6,980	44.70

Pennsylvania's House of Representatives 72nd District, 2010
Party	Candidate	Votes	%
Democratic	Frank Burns	10,365	100.00

Pennsylvania's House of Representatives 72nd District, 2012
Party	Candidate	Votes	%
Democratic	Frank Burns	11,843	100.00

Pennsylvania's House of Representatives 72nd District, 2014
Party	Candidate	Votes	%
Democratic	Frank Burns	11,354	57.55
Republican	Philip Rice	6,792	37.43

Pennsylvania's House of Representatives 72nd District, 2016
Party	Candidate	Votes	%
Democratic	Frank Burns	16,361	57.55
Republican	Cecilia Houser	12,066	42.45

Pennsylvania's House of Representatives 72nd District, 2018
Party	Candidate	Votes	%
Democratic	Frank Burns	11,819	52.42
Republican	Gerald Carnicella	10,726	47.58

Pennsylvania's House of Representatives 72nd District, 2020
Party	Candidate	Votes	%
Democratic	Frank Burns	16,886	52.71
Republican	Howard Terndrup	15,150	47.29

Pennsylvania's House of Representatives 72nd District, 2022
Party	Candidate	Votes	%
Democratic	Frank Burns	14,060	54.19
Republican	Renae Billow	11,757	45.32
Total votes		25,945	100.0

Pennsylvania's House of Representatives 72nd District, 2024
Party	Candidate	Votes	%
Democratic	Frank Burns	16,780	51.24
Republican	Amy Bradley	15,851	48.41
Total votes		32,746	100.0
Democratic hold			
