= Andrew Billow =

American politician

Andrew Billow, Jr.

Member of the Pennsylvania House of Representatives from the 72nd district
- In office April 7, 1987 – November 30, 1992
- Preceded by: William Stewart
- Succeeded by: Thomas Yewcic

Personal details
- Born: February 5, 1924 Johnstown, Pennsylvania
- Died: November 16, 2003 (aged 79) Johnstown, Pennsylvania
- Party: Democratic
- Occupation: businessman

Andrew "Jay" Billow, Jr. (February 5, 1924 – November 16, 2003) was a Democratic member of the Pennsylvania House of Representatives.
