= William J. Stewart (Pennsylvania politician) =

American politician

Member of the Pennsylvania Senate from the 35th district
- In office April 7, 1987 – November 30, 1996
- Preceded by: Mark Singel
- Succeeded by: John Wozniak

Member of the Pennsylvania House of Representatives from the 72nd district
- In office January 4, 1977 – April 7, 1987
- Preceded by: James Whelan
- Succeeded by: Andrew Billow

Personal details
- Born: July 12, 1950 Johnstown, Pennsylvania
- Died: March 7, 2016 (aged 65) Johnstown, Pennsylvania

William J. Stewart (July 12, 1950 – March 7, 2016) was a member of the Pennsylvania State Senate, serving from 1987 to 1996.
