= James Whelan (Pennsylvania politician) =

American politician

James O. Whelan, Jr.

Member of the Pennsylvania House of Representatives from the 72nd district
- In office May 21, 1974 – November 30, 1976
- Preceded by: John Murtha
- Succeeded by: William Stewart

Personal details
- Born: September 19, 1936 Petersburg, Virginia, U.S.
- Died: April 18, 2018 (aged 81) Atlanta, Georgia, U.S.
- Party: Republican

James Octavius Whelan Jr. (September 19, 1936 – April 18, 2018) was a Republican member of the Pennsylvania House of Representatives. He is a native of Petersburg, Virginia.

He was first elected May 21, 1974. He died in 2018 in Atlanta, Georgia.
