= Franklin, Cambria County, Pennsylvania =

Borough in Pennsylvania, US

Franklin, Pennsylvania
- Borough
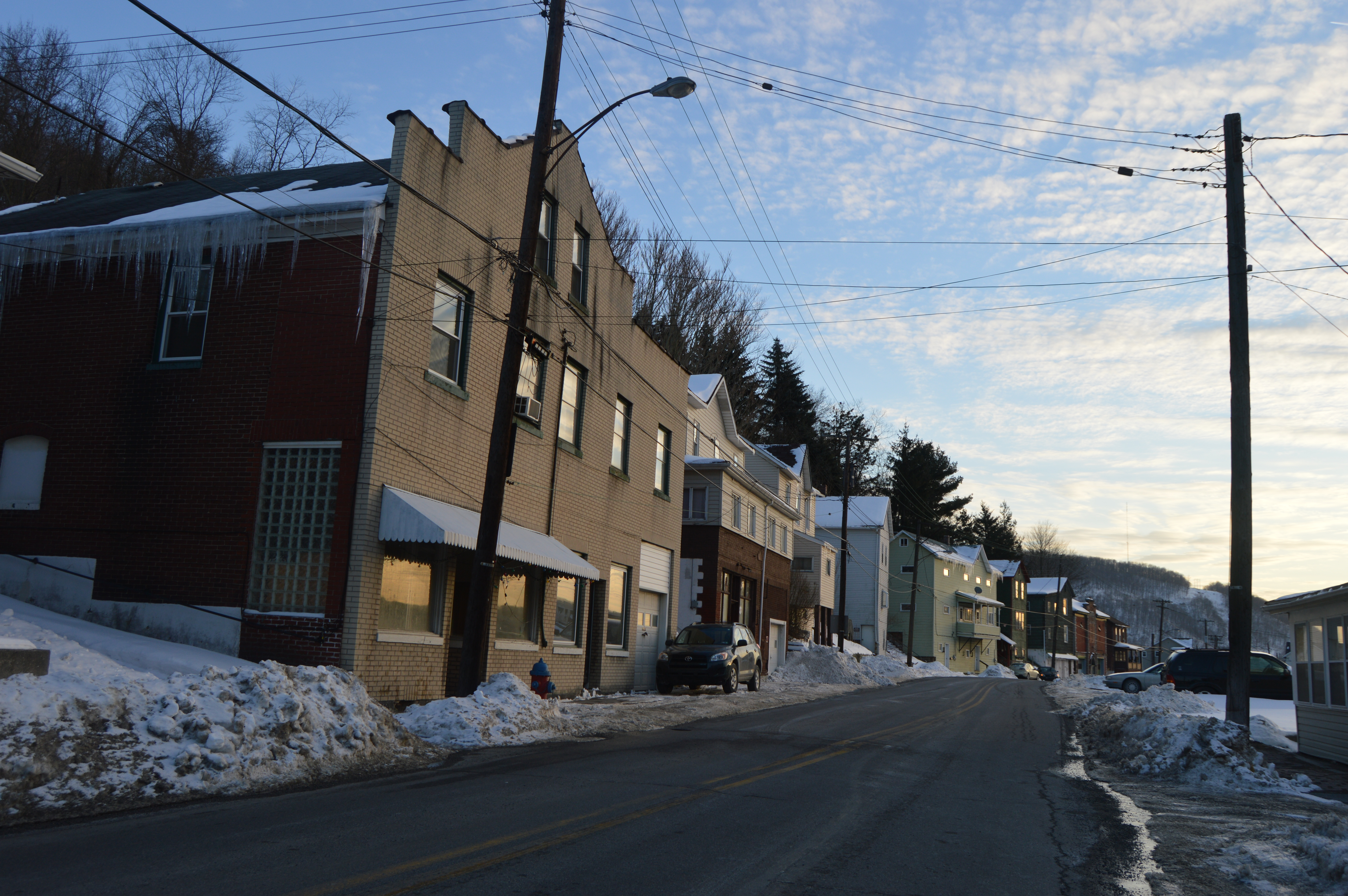
- Main Street

- Location within Pennsylvania
- Coordinates: 40°20′35″N 78°52′55″W
- Country: United States
- State: Pennsylvania
- County: Cambria
- Incorporated: 1868

Government
  - Type: Borough council

Area
  - Total: 0.57 sq mi (1.47 km^{2})
  - Land: 0.55 sq mi (1.43 km^{2})
  - Water: 0.015 sq mi (0.04 km^{2})
- Elevation: 1,289 ft (393 m)

Population (2010)
  - Total: 323
  - Density: 585/sq mi (225.9/km^{2})
- Time zone: UTC-5 (Eastern (EST))
  - Summer (DST): UTC-4 (EDT)
- Area code: 814
- GNIS feature ID: 1215021

Franklin is a borough in Cambria County, Pennsylvania, United States. It is part of the Johnstown, Pennsylvania Metropolitan Statistical Area. At the 2010 census the borough population was 323, down from 442 at the 2000 census.

== History ==
The borough's namesake is Benjamin Franklin.

Sgt. Michael Strank, a Rusyn American and one of the US Marines pictured in the photograph Raising the Flag on Iwo Jima, was raised in Franklin.

== Geography ==
Franklin is located in southwestern Cambria County at 40°20′35″N 78°52′55″W (40.343073, -78.881873), in the valley of the Little Conemaugh River. The river forms the northwestern boundary of the borough, with East Conemaugh and a small portion of Johnstown on the opposite side.

According to the United States Census Bureau, the borough has a total area of 0.58 square miles (1.5 km^{2}), of which 0.02 square miles (0.04 km^{2}), or 2.60%, is water.

== Demographics ==
Historical population
Census	Pop.	Note	%±
1870	426		—
1880	734		72.3%
1890	662		−9.8%
1900	961		45.2%
1910	2,102		118.7%
1920	2,632		25.2%
1930	2,323		−11.7%
1940	2,297		−1.1%
1950	1,833		−20.2%
1960	1,352		−26.2%
1970	864		−36.1%
1980	559		−35.3%
1990	565		1.1%
2000	442		−21.8%
2010	323		−26.9%
2012 (est.)	316		−2.2%

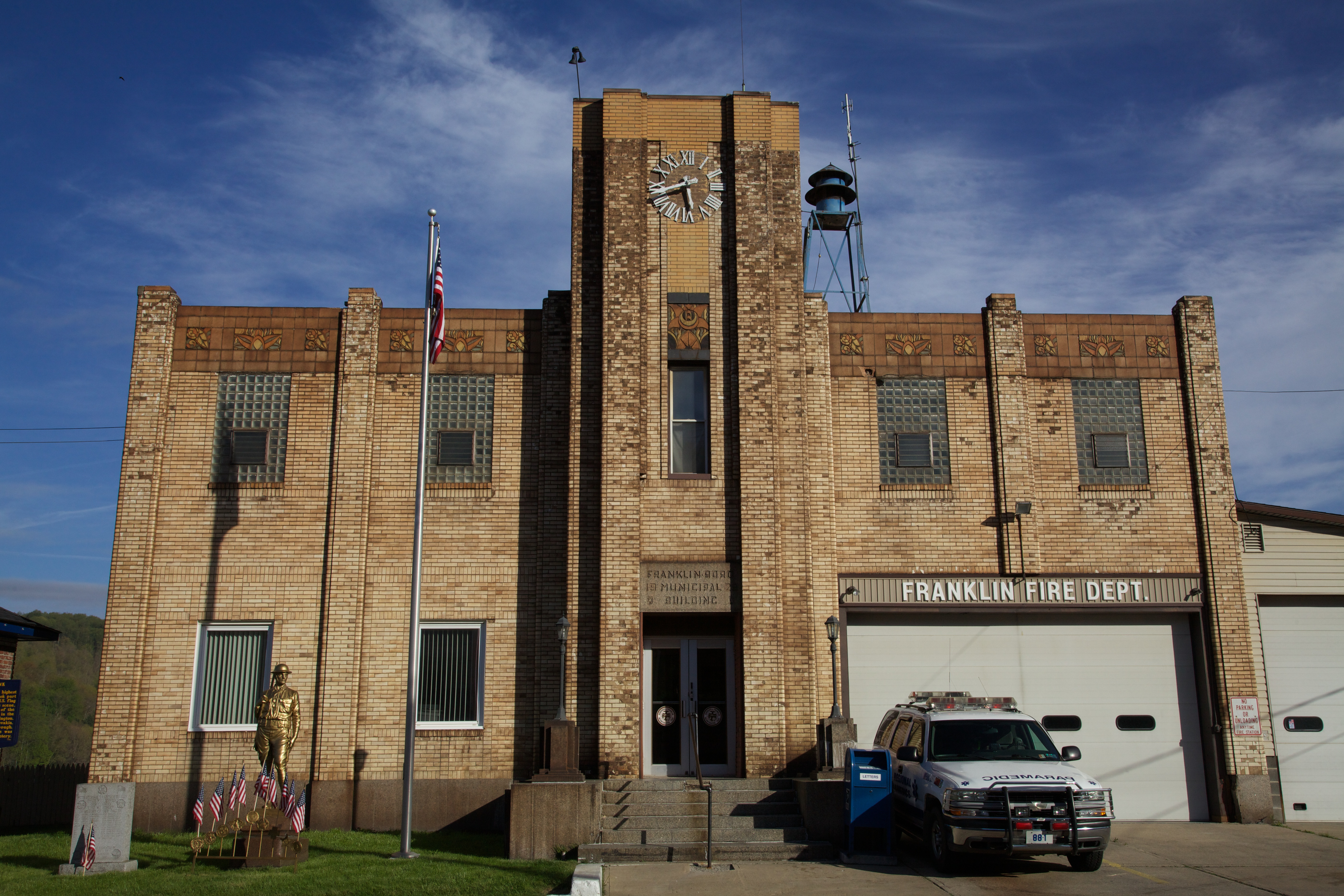
Franklin Boro Municipal Building

At the 2000 census there were 442 people in 204 households, including 130 families, in the borough. The population density was 798.7 inhabitants per square mile (308.4/km^{2}). There were 228 housing units at an average density of 412.0 per square mile (159.1/km^{2}). The racial makeup of the borough was 90.27% White, 9.05% African American, and 0.68% from two or more races. There were 204 households, 21.6% had children under the age of 18 living with them, 43.1% were married couples living together, 13.7% had a female householder with no husband present, and 35.8% were non-families. 34.3% of households were made up of individuals, and 20.6% were one person aged 65 or older. The average household size was 2.17 and the average family size was 2.70.

The age distribution was 16.3% under the age of 18, 7.7% from 18 to 24, 25.1% from 25 to 44, 21.7% from 45 to 64, and 29.2% 65 or older. The median age was 45 years. For every 100 females there were 98.2 males. For every 100 females age 18 and over, there were 96.8 males.

The median household income was $25,625 and the median family income was $29,531. Males had a median income of $25,625 versus $18,750 for females. The per capita income for the borough was $15,322. About 10.4% of families and 10.7% of the population were below the poverty line, including 17.2% of those under age 18 and 6.6% of those age 65 or over.
