= Mark Critz =

American politician (born 1962)

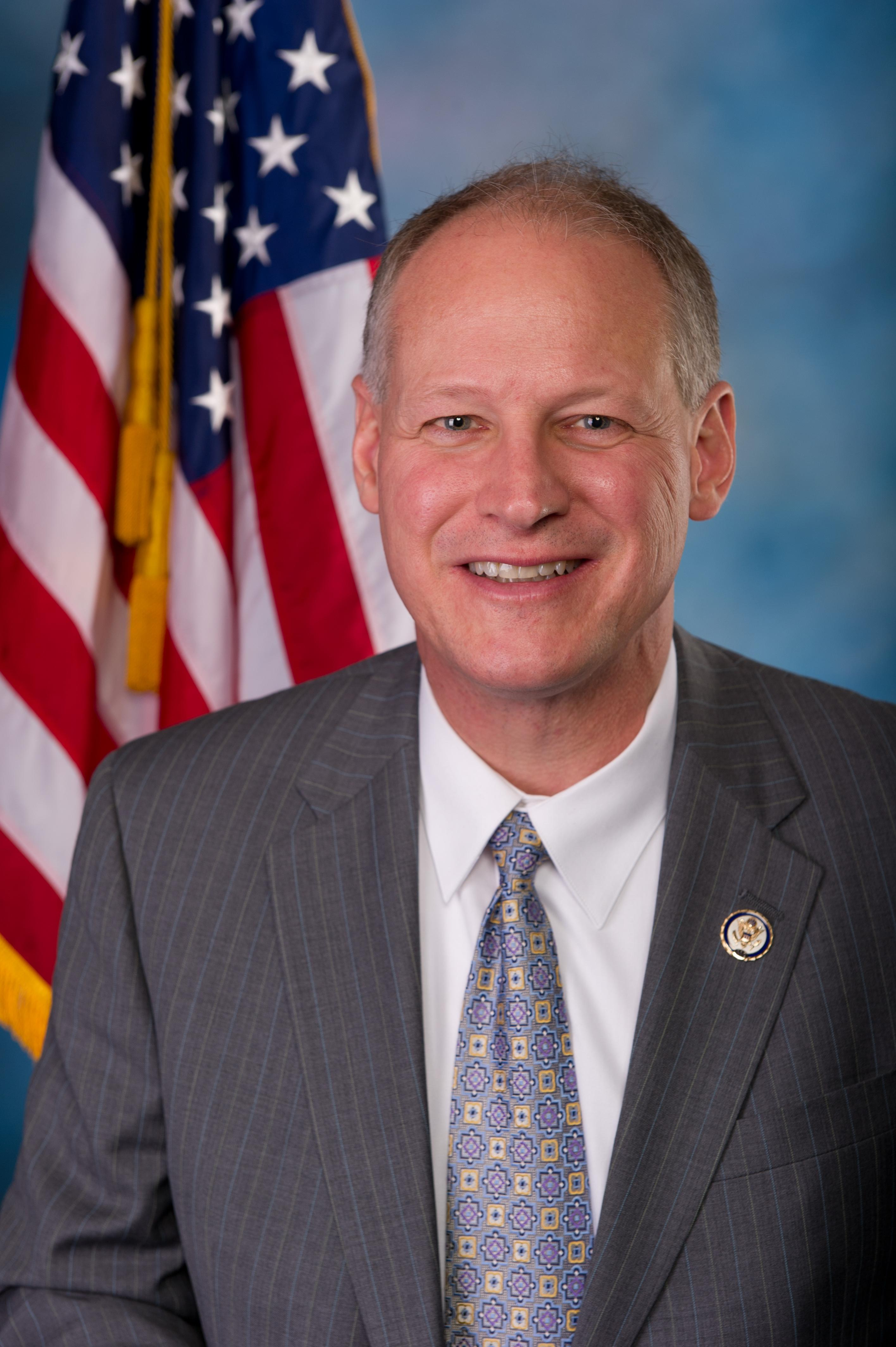

Member of the U.S. House of Representatives from Pennsylvania's 12th district
- In office May 18, 2010 – January 3, 2013 (Note: Critz's official service begins on the date of the special election, while he was not sworn in until May 20, 2010.)
- Preceded by: John Murtha
- Succeeded by: Keith Rothfus

Personal details
- Born: Mark Stephen Critz; January 5, 1962 (age 64) Irwin, Pennsylvania, U.S.
- Party: Democratic
- Spouse: Nancy Critz
- Children: 2
- Education: Indiana University of Pennsylvania (BS)

Mark Stephen Critz (born January 5, 1962) is an American politician and former U.S. representative for Pennsylvania's 12th congressional district, having served from a special election in May 2010 until January 2013. He is a member of the Democratic Party. The district during his tenure, which was located in the southwestern portion of the state, stretched from Johnstown to the southern suburbs of Pittsburgh.

Critz was the district director for the 12th's longtime congressman, John Murtha. Following Murtha's death, Critz won the May 2010 special election with 53% of the vote to complete Murtha's term. Critz was sworn in on May 20. Critz won a full term in November 2010 to represent the 12th District in Congress. He was defeated in November 2012 by Republican challenger Keith Rothfus.

Critz won the Democratic nomination for the 2022 U.S. House of Representatives election in Pennsylvania's 13th congressional district via write-in, but he declined to run.

== Early life, education, and pre-congressional career ==
Critz is the son of Mary Lou (née Rybacki) and William S. Critz. His father was of Slovak descent, and his mother is of half-Polish and half-Italian ancestry. Critz attended Norwin High School in North Huntingdon, Pennsylvania. He went on to obtain a Bachelor of Science degree in Management Information Systems from Indiana University of Pennsylvania in Indiana, Pennsylvania.

"Most of my friends, their folks worked in the mill or were small business owners," Critz told the National Journal about his upbringing. "There were hundreds of thousands of families that relied on steel directly, and when that started to fade the area got hit pretty hard." The National Journal also wrote that, after his college graduation, Critz "struggled to find work in the decimated local economy" and he “left the region for a job managing a Roy Rogers restaurant in Wilmington, Delaware” in 1987. In addition to Roy Rogers, Critz served as a manager for Spherical Concepts and American Eagle Outfitters.

He then took landscaping and construction jobs before becoming a volunteer for Congressman John Murtha in 1994. Four years later, he took a paying job on Murtha's staff, eventually rising to the position of District Director. Critz focused on district issues, serving as Murtha's liaison to the Flight 93 Memorial committee and the Que Creek Mine disaster site.

PoliticsPA reported that "Critz...attended a 2005 meeting with defense contractors and lobbyists and offered the Congressman's [Murtha's] support for an earmark project that ended in the criminal convictions of three men."

Critz was recognized for his service to the military when he was awarded the Patrick Henry Award by the National Guard Association of the United States (NGAUS). It is the highest civilian award issued by the National Guard.

== U.S. House of Representatives ==
=== Elections ===
Special 2010 election

After Murtha's death in February 2010, Critz, with the support of Murtha's widow and the Democratic Party, decided to run for the vacant seat in a May special election. He announced on February 22, 2010, that he would resign his position with the 12th Congressional District and seek the Democratic nomination to run in the special election, which was held on May 18, 2010. In the wake of his selection to run in the special election, Critz released a statement saying "he would make economic development his No. 1 priority in Congress." On March 8, the Pennsylvania Democratic Party Executive Committee followed the recommendation of the district officials by nominating Critz. Of the 49 votes cast by the Committee members, Critz received 30.

Critz was endorsed by Vice President Joe Biden, who also campaigned for Critz in early 2010. In March 2010, Critz received the endorsement of the AFL-CIO of Pennsylvania. Critz received an 86% approval rating from the American Federation of Labor and Congress of Industrial Organizations (AFL-CIO) In April he received an endorsement from the United Mine Workers. The National Committee to Preserve Social Security and Medicare endorsed Critz.

Critz defeated Republican businessman Tim Burns 53%-45%.

Regular 2010 election

In 2010, Critz spent a total of $2,428,377.66 on his campaign. His top contributors were Progeny Systems, Mepco LLC, and Concurrent Technologies. Critz defeated Burns in a rematch 51%-49%.

2012

Critz decided to run in the newly redrawn 12th district, which had been pushed to the west to absorb much of the old 4th district. He defeated 4th District incumbent Jason Altmire in the Democratic primary. However, Critz could not overcome the redder hue of his redrawn district, and was defeated by Altmire's 2010 opponent, Keith Rothfus, 52%-48%.

2022

In June 2022, Critz became the Democratic nominee for the redrawn 13th district, receiving 967 votes as a write-in candidate. He would have faced incumbent John Joyce but declined to run.

=== Tenure ===
Critz voted for Congressional adjournment in Sept 2010. Adjournment foes sought an extension of the Bush-era tax cuts before the November elections. The adjournment resolution passed 210–209. He voted against the Dodd–Frank Wall Street Reform and Consumer Protection Act which passed the House in July 2010 by a vote of 239–192.

Critz received a 100% approval rating from both The American Farm Bureau Federation and the National Farmers Union. In 2009, he received a 50% approval rating from the Defenders of Wildlife Action Fund and a 100% approval rating from the Society for Animal Protective Legislation.

The International Brotherhood of Boilermakers and the National Association for the Self-Employed gave Critz a 100% approval rating. He received an 85% approval rating from The International Association of Machinists and Aerospace Workers, and he received a 50% approval rating from the interest group for Federally Employed Women. He opposes "Cap and Trade" and emissions trading in the American Clean Energy and Security Act. On October 12, 2011, Critz voted against free trade agreements with Panama, Colombia, and South Korea. He says that he supports fair trade

Critz campaigned on the platform that "Social Security is a contract between the government and Americans who have spent their entire lives working, and it is one the government must honor. I will fight all schemes to gamble your social security on the stock market." He opposed privatization and a higher retirement age.

Critz described himself as pro-life, and has received a 100% approval rating from the National Right to Life Committee. He received a 0% approval from Planned Parenthood. He voted no on July 1, 2010, to limit Afghanistan military funding to withdrawal and other specified purposes and to require a timetable for withdrawal from Afghanistan. He also voted no on March 17, 2011, to removing troops from Afghanistan.

=== Committee assignments ===
- Committee on Armed Services
  - Subcommittee on Tactical Air and Land Forces
  - Subcommittee on Seapower and Projection Forces
  - Subcommittee on Military Personnel
- Committee on Small Business
  - Subcommittee on Agriculture, Energy and Trade (Ranking Member)
  - Subcommittee on Contracting and Workforce

=== Caucus memberships ===
- Congressional Coal Caucus
- Congressional Military Families Caucus
- Congressional Natural Gas Caucus
- Congressional Research and Development Caucus
- Congressional Rural Education Caucus
- International Conservation Caucus
- Marcellus Shale Caucus
- Congressional Arts Caucus

== Campaign for lieutenant governor ==
Critz told a radio show host on August 14, 2013, that he would be a Democratic candidate for lieutenant governor of Pennsylvania in the 2014 election to challenge incumbent Republican Jim Cawley. He lost the May 20 primary to State Senator Mike Stack.

== Later career ==
Critz went on to work for the campaign of Tom Wolf, who defeated incumbent Tom Corbett.

In April 2015, Mark Critz began work as the executive director of the Pennsylvania Rural Development Council.

== Personal life ==
Critz, his wife Nancy, and their two children, reside in Johnstown.

U.S. House of Representatives
Preceded by John Murtha	Member of the U.S. House of Representatives from Pennsylvania's 12th congressional district 2010–2013	Succeeded by Keith Rothfus
U.S. order of precedence (ceremonial)
Preceded by Kathy Dahlkemper as Former U.S. Representative	Order of precedence of the United States as Former U.S. Representative	Succeeded by William J. Martini as Former U.S. Representative
