= American Spirit Honor Medal =

American award

The American Spirit Honor Medal is a medallion provided by the Citizens Committee for the Army, Navy and Air Force, Inc. It has been accepted for use in basic training or one station unit training at training divisions and centers within continental United States as an award for the display of outstanding qualities of leadership best expressing the American spirit—honor, initiative, loyalty, and high example to comrades in arms; and as a means of promoting closer relationship between the Armed Forces and the civil communities in which the training divisions and centers are located.

It is a bronze medallion, 1.375 inches (34.9 mm) in diameter, on the obverse side a sunburst with the American eagle rampant, superimposed. Around the perimeter are the words "American Spirit Honor Medal" and in an interior circle the motto of the Citizens Committee for the Army, Navy, and Air Force, Inc.: "Serve with Heart, Head, and Hand". On the reverse side, is a torch with the words: “For High Example to Comrades in Arms".

The American Spirit Honor Medal is awarded to trainees of the United States Army who have had no prior military service and no assignment to a unit other than a Reserve (UFA) or training unit. It is awarded upon completion of basic training or one station unit training to not more than one trainee out of the graduating group at each training center or unit.

The American Spirit Honor Medal will not be worn on the uniform.

== Sources ==
- Army Regulations No. 672-210 DECORATIONS AND AWARDS - LEADERSHIP - AMERICAN SPIRIT HONOR MEDAL 10 June 1962
