= 2010 Pennsylvania's 12th congressional district special election =

- May 18, 2010
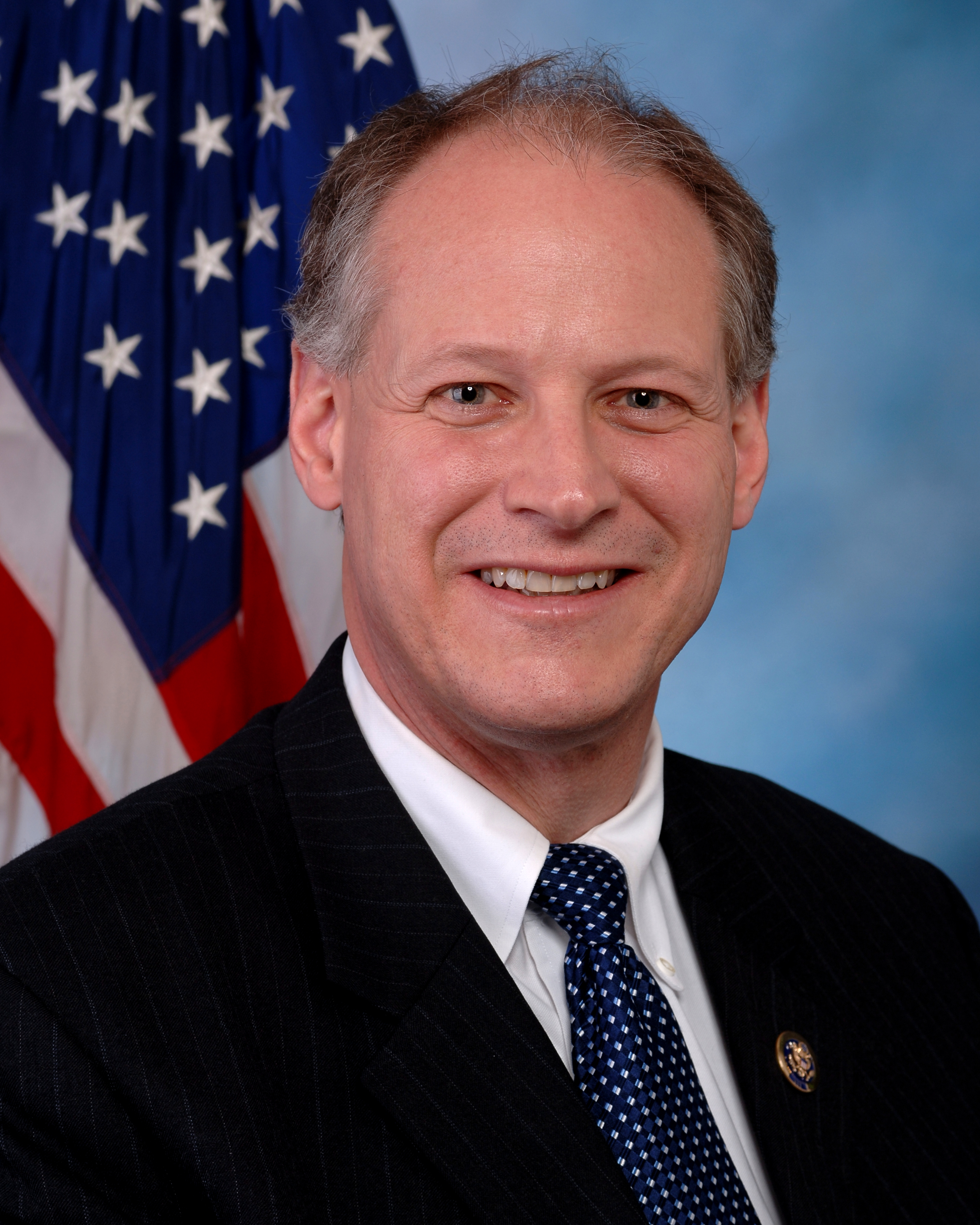

| Candidate | Mark Critz | Tim Burns |
| Party | Democratic | Republican |
| Popular vote | 70,915 | 60,740 |
| Percentage | 52.6% | 45.1% |
- County results Critz: 40–50% 50–60% Burns: 50–60%
U.S. Representative before election
John Murtha
Democratic
Elected U.S. Representative
Mark Critz
Democratic

The 2010 special election for the 12th congressional district of Pennsylvania was held on May 18, 2010, to fill the seat left vacant by the death of Democratic U.S. Representative John Murtha. Democratic nominee Mark Critz, Murtha's former district director, defeated Republican nominee Tim Burns. Both candidates were nominated at their respective primary election concurrent with the special election and faced off in the general election November 2010, with Critz again defeating Burns.

== Background ==
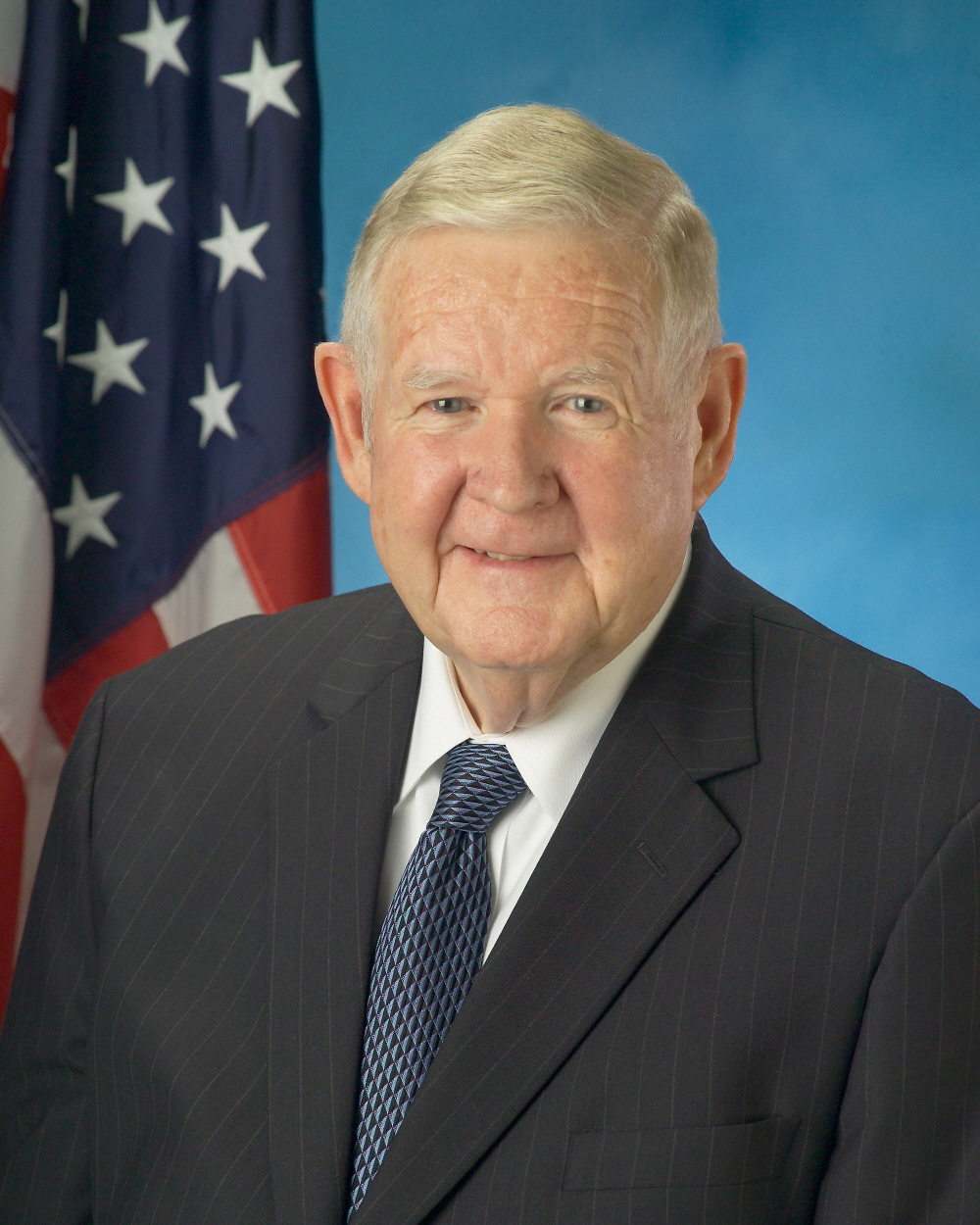
John Murtha, whose death triggered a special election in Pennsylvania's 12th congressional district

Though the late Representative, Murtha, the longest serving congressman in the history of Pennsylvania, was consistently re-elected to his seat by large margins, the special election was expected to be competitive.

The 12th district is predominantly rural, and represents the coal and manufacturing industries, which have suffered in recent decades. It was the only congressional district in the United States which gave a majority of its vote to Republican nominee John McCain in 2008 after voting for Democratic nominee John Kerry in 2004. However, at the time of the election Democrats outnumbered Republicans by a 2-to-1 ratio in the 12th district. A poll conducted by Public Policy Polling (PPP) in May 2010 found President Obama with an approval rating of 35 percent, with 55 percent disapproving. A PPP poll conducted in April found Speaker of the House of Representatives Nancy Pelosi, U.S. Senator Arlen Specter, and Pennsylvania Governor Ed Rendell (all Democrats) to be "exceptionally unpopular", though 55 percent of the district identify as members of the Democratic Party.

The special election result was considered likely to have ramifications on the national political environment, as an opportunity for Republicans to follow up their victory in the U.S. Senate special election in Massachusetts in January 2010 in a district of the sort they intend to target in the November 2010 elections. National issues, including health care, government spending, cap-and-trade legislation and the role of government. Republican nominee Tim Burns described the election as "a referendum on the Obama-[Nancy] Pelosi agenda," while The Washington Post's Chris Cillizza said "the race is simply a must-win" for Republicans, and political scientist Tom Schaller of FiveThirtyEight wrote that the district "is precisely the sort of district Republicans have in their sights for 2010". The Democratic Congressional Campaign Committee described the district as "exactly the type of district that House Republicans need to win this cycle." Critz downplayed the national consequences of the election, saying "I can't really concern myself with national issues. I'm concentrating on my race here. I'm just a local guy that's running for a seat."

On election day, CQ Politics, The Rothenberg Political Report, The Cook Political Report, and Tom Jensen of Public Policy Polling all characterized the race as a tossup.

== Democratic nomination ==
=== Candidates ===
==== Ran for nomination ====
- Ryan Bucchianeri, United States Navy veteran
- Ed Cernic Jr., Cambria County Controller
- Mark Critz, Murtha's district director
- Barbara Hafer, former Pennsylvania Auditor General and Treasurer

==== Declined to run ====
- Tom Ceraso, Westmoreland County Commissioner, endorsed Ed Cernic Jr.
- Jack Hanna, chair of the Pennsylvania Democratic Party's southwest caucus
- Joyce Murtha, Murtha's widow, endorsed Mark Critz
- Albert Penksa, former Cambria County Controller, endorsed Mark Critz
- Mark Singel, former Lieutenant Governor of Pennsylvania announced his intention to run on February 19, 2010, but withdrew from the race on February 25 and endorsed Mark Critz.
- John Wozniak, state Senator

=== Campaign ===
On March 6, 2010, a panel of Democratic officials from the 12th district recommended Mark Critz as their preferred Democratic nominee. Critz received 46 of 83 votes cast, while Barbara Hafer received 22, Ed Cernic Jr. received 14, and Ryan Bucchianeri received one vote. The Pennsylvania Democratic Party's Executive Committee will make the final decision on their party's nominee on March 8; however, they are expected to follow the non-binding recommendation of Critz made by local officials. T.J. Rooney, chair of the Pennsylvania Democratic Party, said "The members of the Executive Committee will certainly take these results under consideration this Monday when they decide our nominee." On March 6, the Democratic committee of Washington County declared that it would hold its own separate straw poll.

In early March, Hafer criticized the nominating process used by the state Democratic Party, describing the vote by 12th district Democrats as "flawed and non-transparent and non-democratic". She also criticized Critz over his ties to controversial earmarks obtained by Murtha, and questioned Critz's electability against the Republican nominee. In response to Hafer's allegations, Critz asked the Office of Congressional Ethics on March 10 to release transcripts of interviews with Critz which were conducted while Murtha was under investigation.

Bucchianeri and U.S. Air Force veteran Ron Mackell Jr. ran for the Democratic nomination for the general election; it was therefore possible that Critz could win the special election but lose the primary for the November general election. Hafer had initially planned to run for the Democratic nomination in the general election, but withdrew on March 10, 2010, saying "He won both nominations, and I just think that it's time for me to step aside and let him go forward. There's no sense in me beating him up."

=== Results ===
On March 8, the Pennsylvania Democratic Party Executive Committee followed the recommendation of the district officials by nominating Mark Critz. Of the 49 votes cast by the Committee members, Critz received 30, Hafer received 18, Bucchianeri received one and Cernic received zero. Critz said "I'm honored to have the state committee's endorsement," while Rooney described Critz as "a phenomenal candidate".

== Republican nomination ==
=== Candidates ===
==== Ran for nomination ====
- Tim Burns, businessman
- Bill Choby, three-time former candidate for the 12th district
- Ron Robertson, businessman
- William Russell, 2008 Republican nominee
- Luke Summerfield

==== Declined to run ====
- Diana Irey, Washington County Commissioner and 2006 Republican nominee, endorsed Tim Burns
- Mark Pasquerilla, chief executive officer of Crown American, endorsed Democratic candidate Mark Critz
- Jeff Pyle, state Representative
- Dave L. Reed, state Representative
- Kim Ward, state Senator

=== Campaign ===
Businessman Tim Burns began his campaign for the Republican nomination on March 3 at the Surf & Turf Inn in Johnstown, the site of his first job. Burns said "We have to get Congress to focus on creating jobs, lowering taxes and fixing Washington for the future of our children."

=== Results ===
Republicans from the 12th district met on March 11, 2010, in Latrobe, to choose their nominee. Tim Burns was nominated, receiving 85 of 131 votes cast. William Russell received 46. In a speech prior to the nomination vote, Burns referred to his support for the Tea Party movement, articulated his positions on the current plans for health care reform, United States energy independence and the national deficit, and described his nomination as "an opportunity to put a common-sense conservative in a seat that has long been held by a political insider". Russell said that "The party doesn't want a candidate that's connected to the people, they want one with money. While unfortunate, this is what we expected."

== Libertarian nomination ==
Demo Agoris, a businessman, former Houston borough councilman and unsuccessful candidate for the Pennsylvania House of Representatives, received the Libertarian Party nomination. Michael Robertson, the chair of the Libertarian Party of Pennsylvania, said Agoris "offers real change" for residents of the 12th district. Agoris has said he is running "To bring to light the agenda of the Libertarian Party and how the left and right agenda is destroying America and selling out America to foreign investors."

== General election ==
=== Campaign ===
The fact that the special election coincided with contested Democratic gubernatorial and U.S. Senate primaries may have led to increased voter turnout among Democrats, benefiting Critz; however, Jack Hanna, the chair of the Pennsylvania Democratic Party's southwestern caucus, said "There's going to be a lackluster turnout in part because of the governor's race not generating the kind of interest that usually occurs, especially with an open seat." The special election coinciding with the primary also meant that Critz and Burns were running against one another, while also running against opponents from within their own parties in the regularly scheduled primary. On March 19, 2010, Republican candidate William Russell, who lost the Republican nomination to Burns and also ran against Burns in the regularly scheduled primary, stated that he would not directly support Burns as a protest against the process by which Burns was selected, saying "I won't support a process that is not open and free." Russell also said he would vote for himself as a write-in candidate in the special election. Burns's campaign manager said that Burns would focus on the special election rather than the simultaneous primary, saying "If we can get enough support going in the special then we'll have the primary too." The candidacy of Libertarian Party nominee Demo Agoris may also have detracted from Burns's share of the vote.

In March 2010, Robert Gleason, chair of the Republican State Committee of Pennsylvania, described a Republican victory as "doable".

Burns announced his opposition to the Patient Protection and Affordable Care Act at a "Kill the Bill Rally" on March 19, describing the bill as "probably the worst piece of legislation in American history". He went on to tell the crowd that he had asked Critz to "simply state his position" on the bill, but had not yet seen a statement from Critz.

On March 30, Critz received the endorsement of the Pennsylvania AFL-CIO. The next day, Burns received the endorsement of Minnesota Governor Tim Pawlenty. Former Speaker of the House Newt Gingrich campaigned for Burns on April 22, while Vice President Joe Biden campaigned for Critz on April 23. On April 26, Burns received the endorsement of former Governor of Alaska and 2008 vice presidential candidate Sarah Palin; while on April 28, Critz received the endorsement of the United Steelworkers. On May 3, 2010, Burns announced that Republican U.S. Senator Scott Brown of Massachusetts would campaign with him in Washington, Pennsylvania on May 14. The same day, Critz announced that Democratic Governor Joe Manchin of West Virginia would join him at a campaign event. Musician Jon Bauman of doo-wop group Sha Na Na also campaigned for Critz in May.

Burns' first television advertisement began airing on March 31, while Critz's first advertisement was launched a day later. On April 9, the National Republican Congressional Committee (NRCC) reported having spent $200,000 on Burns's campaign. Critz's campaign also ran advertisements stating his opposition to "tax breaks for companies that outsource jobs overseas", while Burns criticized Critz's relationship with Murtha's ethics scandals. The NRCC also launched an advertisement linking Critz to the Patient Protection and Affordable Care Act; to which Critz responded by releasing an advertisement stating he had opposed the legislation. Critz also described himself in the advertisement as "pro-life and pro-gun." Critz later said he would not support repeal of the legislation, following which Burns accused him of "playing both sides of the issue" on health care.

Burns was criticised for having served as an executive in a healthcare company which deferred taxes on income earned overseas. Critz was criticised for his record as John Murtha's director of economic development, in which unemployment rates rose in every county within the 12th district.

In an interview with RealClearPolitics on April 22, Burns referenced a controversial comment made by then-presidential candidate Barack Obama in April 2008, in which Obama said people in rural Pennsylvania "get bitter, they cling to guns or religion ... as a way to explain their frustrations." Burns said "People do cling to their Bibles and their guns here. And I wouldn't apologize for it and people are not embarrassed by it."

Burns's campaign website crashed on April 23, during a moneybomb focusing on Joe Biden's visit to the district. Spokesman Kent Gates initially cited "a problem with the hosting company", but the Burns campaign later claimed in a fundraising email that the site was "attacked". Gates told The Hill ""it is true that the site was hacked at some level" and that a "disgruntled employee" may have been responsible.

As of May 7, 2010, Burns had a cash on hand advantage over Critz, with US$308,000 to Critz's $73,000. The National Republican Congressional Committee has spent $728,000 on Burns' behalf, while the Democratic Congressional Campaign Committee has spent $341,000 in support of Critz.

=== Debates ===
Burns and Critz attended a debate held on May 5, 2010, in Johnstown, Pennsylvania. The candidates addressed issues including Social Security privatization (which Burns promised to oppose), the FairTax proposal (which Burns said would not be practical), and Critz's relationship with the "liberal agenda" (Critz reiterated his opposition to the health care reform legislation passed by Congress, while Burns advocated repeal). Critz also endorsed the repeal of the don't ask, don't tell policy.

=== Polling ===
| Poll source | Date(s) administered | Sample size | Margin of error | Mark Critz (D) | Tim Burns (R) | Demo Agoris (L) | Other | Undecided |
|---|---|---|---|---|---|---|---|---|
| Public Policy Polling (report) | May 15–16, 2010 | 831 | ±3.4% | 47% | 48% | – | – | 6% |
| Susquehanna Polling & Research (report) | May 10, 2010 | 400 | ±4.9% | 44% | 38% | – | – | – |
| Anzalone Liszt^{1} (report) | April 27–29, 2010 | 406 | ? | 43% | 41% | – | – | – |
| Global Strategy Group^{2} (report) | April 27–29, 2010 | 400 | ±4.9% | 45% | 37% | – | – | – |
| Global Strategy Group^{2} (report) | April 27–29, 2010 | 400 | ±4.9% | 44% | 36% | 2% | – | – |
| Public Policy Polling (report) | April 17–18, 2010 | 1,197 | ±2.8% | 41% | 44% | – | – | 13% |
| McLaughlin & Associates^{3} (report) | April 15, 2010 | 300 | ±5.6% | 40% | 39% | – | – | 21% |
| We Ask America (report) | March 15, 2010 | 1,365 | ±2.65% | 38.83% | 34.73% | – | – | 26.45% |
| Gene Ulm, Public Opinion Strategies^{4} (report) | March 14–15, 2010 | 400 | ±4.9% | 41% | 45% | – | – | 13% |
| Pittsburgh Tribune-Review/ Susquehanna Polling & Research (report) | March 14–15, 2010 | 400 | ±4.9% | 36% | 31% | – | 2% | 31% |

=== Results ===
Pennsylvania's 12th congressional district special election, 2010
| Party | Candidate | Votes | % |
|---|---|---|---|
| Democratic | Mark Critz | 70,915 | 52.6 |
| Republican | Tim Burns | 60,740 | 45.1 |
| Libertarian | Demo Agoris | 3,158 | 2.3 |
| Total votes | | 134,813 | 100.00 |
| Democratic hold | | | |

By county

| County | Critz | % | Burns | % | Agoris | % |
|---|---|---|---|---|---|---|
| Allegheny | 519 | 57.6% | 359 | 39.9% | 23 | 2.6% |
| Armstrong | 3,392 | 41.9% | 4,454 | 55.0% | 246 | 3.0% |
| Cambria | 19,216 | 57.2% | 13,864 | 41.3% | 500 | 1.5% |
| Fayette | 11,176 | 59.2% | 7,352 | 39.0% | 343 | 1.8% |
| Greene | 5,164 | 56.7% | 3,716 | 40.8% | 224 | 2.5% |
| Indiana | 1,540 | 42.5% | 1,990 | 54.9% | 93 | 2.6% |
| Somerset | 4,269 | 48.3% | 4,430 | 50.1% | 144 | 1.6% |
| Washington | 10,485 | 49.7% | 9,715 | 46.0% | 914 | 4.3% |
| Westmoreland | 15,154 | 49.4% | 14,860 | 48.4% | 671 | 2.2% |

== Aftermath ==
On election day, Critz prevailed over Burns by a greater than expected margin of 52.6 percent to Burns's 45.1 percent. Critz's election was the eleventh straight Democratic victory in special elections to the House of Representatives.

Burns, in his concession speech, said "I didn't get in this race to win an election, I got in this race to play my small part in helping to save this country. This isn't a loss – this is a setback."

The Pennsylvania Republican Party and Burns's campaign planned to file a complaint in response to allegations that Critz was campaigning inside polling places on election day, and that "about 170" voters in Fayette County were given two ballot papers for the special election.

Michael Steele, chair of the Republican National Committee issued a statement saying Burns had "pushed his Democratic opponent to the wire by campaigning against the liberal agenda of national Democrats ... This race should serve notice to Democratic officeholders everywhere that no seat is safe and that voters will not accept business-as-usual." Former Republican U.S. Representative Tom Davis, however, asked "If you can't win a seat that is trending Republican in a year like this, then where is the wave?"

Stuart Rothenberg of the non-partisan Rothenberg political report, however, has stated that even though Democrats were able to win a competitive race to hold on to Murtha's former seat, "But the road doesn't necessarily get easier for Democrats. Critz was pro-life, pro-gun, and opposed the health care reform bill that many vulnerable Democratic incumbents supported." Rothenberg still predicts that Republicans will make substantial gains, which suggests that this could be a pyrrhic victory for Democrats comparable to the Republican win in 2006 special House election in California's 50th congressional district in which the ruling party managed to hold onto a district in a special election, but still lost control of Congress months later.

Critz and Burns each received their parties' nomination for the regularly scheduled general election for the seat and faced each other again in November 2010 for a full two-year term, with Critz beating Burns for a second time.

== Notes ==
1. Poll conducted on behalf of the Democratic Congressional Campaign Committee.
2. Poll conducted on behalf of Mark Critz's campaign.
3. Poll conducted on behalf of the American Action Network, a conservative organization.
4. Ulm is a Republican strategist and pollster.
