= John Murtha =

American politician (1932–2010)

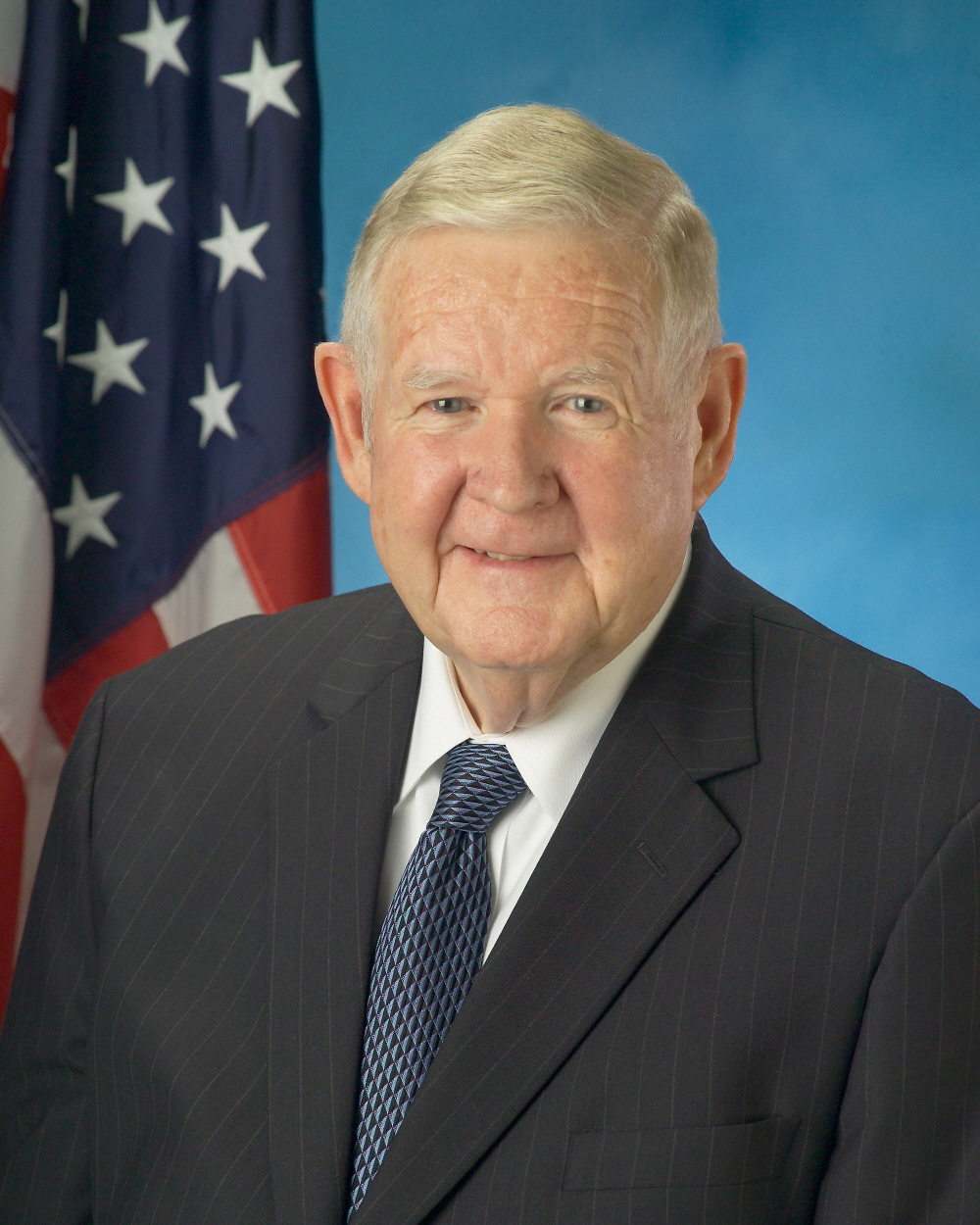
- Official portrait, 2008

Member of the U.S. House of Representatives from Pennsylvania's 12th district
- In office February 5, 1974 – February 8, 2010
- Preceded by: John P. Saylor
- Succeeded by: Mark Critz

Member of the Pennsylvania House of Representatives from the 72nd district
- In office May 20, 1969 – February 5, 1974
- Preceded by: Edward McNally (elect)^{[a]}
- Succeeded by: James Whelan

Personal details
- Born: John Patrick Murtha Jr. June 17, 1932 New Martinsville, West Virginia, U.S.
- Died: February 8, 2010 (aged 77) Arlington, Virginia, U.S.
- Resting place: Grandview Cemetery
- Party: Democratic
- Spouse: Joyce Murtha
- Children: 3
- Education: Washington and Jefferson College; University of Pittsburgh (BA); Indiana University of Pennsylvania
- Civilian awards: American Spirit Honor Medal; Navy Distinguished Public Service Award

Military service
- Branch/service: United States Marine Corps
- Years of service: 1952–1990
- Rank: Colonel
- Battles/wars: Vietnam War
- Military awards: Navy Distinguished Service Medal; Bronze Star Medal; Purple Heart (2); Combat Action Ribbon; Vietnamese Cross of Gallantry
- John Murtha's voice Murtha speaks on the FY1995 National Defense Authorization Act; Recorded September 29, 1994
- a. McNally was elected in November 1968. However, he died shortly after being elected, and thus was never sworn in.

John Patrick Murtha Jr. (/ˈmɜːrθə/ MUR-thə; June 17, 1932 – February 8, 2010) was an American politician and Marine Corps officer. A member of the Democratic Party, he represented Pennsylvania's 12th congressional district in the United States House of Representatives from 1974 until his death in 2010. Murtha was the first Vietnam War veteran elected to the U.S. House of Representatives and is the longest-serving member of the chamber ever elected from Pennsylvania.

Murtha was a native of West Virginia and western Pennsylvania. He was a Marine Corps officer in the 1950s and later volunteered for service in the Vietnam War from 1966 to 1967, where he received honors including the Bronze Star Medal and two Purple Hearts. A member of the Pennsylvania House of Representatives from 1969 to 1974, Murtha narrowly won a special election to U.S. Congress in 1974 and was successively reelected every two years until his death.

In the first decade of the 21st century, Murtha had been best known for his calls for a withdrawal of American forces in the Iraq War, as well as questions about his ethics. After the Democrats won control of the House of Representatives in the 2006 midterm elections he made an unsuccessful bid to be elected House Majority Leader during the 110th Congress (2007–2009), losing to Steny Hoyer of Maryland.

== Early life and military career ==
Murtha was born into an Irish-American family in New Martinsville, West Virginia, near the border with Ohio and Pennsylvania, and grew up in Paden City, West Virginia and then Westmoreland County, Pennsylvania, a largely suburban county east of Pittsburgh. He was the son of Mary Edna (née Ray) and John Patrick Murtha.

As a youth, he became an Eagle Scout. He also worked delivering newspapers and at a gas station before graduating from The Kiski School, an all-male boarding school in Saltsburg, Pennsylvania.

Murtha left Washington and Jefferson College in 1952 to join the Marine Corps and was awarded the American Spirit Honor Medal for displaying outstanding leadership qualities during training. He became a drill instructor at Parris Island and was selected for Officer Candidate School in Virginia. He was then assigned to the Second Marine Division, Marine Corps Base Camp Lejeune in North Carolina. As an undergraduate, Murtha was initiated into the Kappa Sigma fraternity.

Murtha remained in the Marine Forces Reserve and ran a small business, Johnstown Minute Car Wash (which still operates in the West End section of Johnstown). He also attended the University of Pittsburgh on the G.I. Bill, and received a degree in economics. Murtha later took graduate courses from the Indiana University of Pennsylvania.

Murtha left the Marines in 1955. He remained in the Reserves after his discharge from active duty until he volunteered for service in the Vietnam War, serving from 1966 to 1967, serving as a battalion staff officer (S-2 Intelligence Section) with the 1st Battalion, 1st Marine Regiment, 1st Marine Division, receiving the Bronze Star with Valor device, two Purple Hearts, and the Vietnamese Cross of Gallantry. He retired from the Marine Corps Reserve as a colonel in 1990, receiving the Navy Distinguished Service Medal.

== Pennsylvania House of Representatives (1969–1974) ==
Soon after returning from Vietnam, Murtha won the Democratic nomination for what was then the 22nd District, which was based in Johnstown, Pennsylvania. He lost fairly handily to longtime Republican incumbent John P. Saylor.

Murtha was elected to represent the 72nd legislative district in the Pennsylvania House of Representatives in a special election on May 20, 1969. The election was triggered by the death of Representative Edward McNally, who died in November 1968. He was elected to a full term in 1970.

== U.S. House of Representatives (1974–2010) ==
=== Elections ===
Congressman Saylor died in October 1973, nine months into his 13th term. Murtha immediately jumped into the special election contest in what was now the 12th District. In the February 1974 special election, which took place during the burgeoning Watergate scandal, Murtha defeated one of Saylor's former aides, Harry Fox, by only 242 votes, and was sworn in on February 20. He defeated Fox for a full term by a significantly wider margin in the general election that November and was re-elected 17 times.

Murtha faced tough primary challenges in 1982, 1990 and again in 2002. The 1982 challenge occurred when the Republican-controlled state legislature took advantage of Murtha's connection to Abscam and incorporated most of the district of fellow Vietnam War veteran and Democrat Don Bailey of Westmoreland County into the 12th District. The 2002 challenge occurred when the state legislature redrew the district of Democrat Frank Mascara to make it more Republican-friendly, shifting a large chunk of Mascara's former territory into Murtha's district. Mascara opted to run against Murtha in the Democratic primary since the new 12th was geographically more his district than Murtha's. However, Mascara was badly defeated.

In 2006, his Republican challenger was Diana Irey, a county commissioner from Washington County, Pennsylvania, the heart of Mascara's former district. Irey attacked Murtha for his criticism of the Iraq war. Even though Irey was Murtha's strongest Republican opponent in decades, she polled well behind Murtha throughout the campaign. A poll by the Pittsburgh Tribune-Review on October 12, 2006, showed Murtha with a commanding lead over Irey, 57%–30%. In the November election, Murtha won 61%–39%.

=== Tenure ===
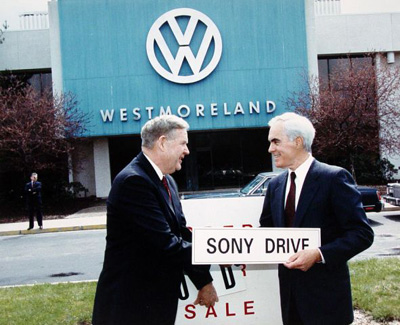
Murtha with Governor Robert P. Casey at the former Volkswagen Westmoreland Assembly in 1990

In 1980, during his fourth term as a congressman, Murtha became embroiled in the Abscam investigation, which targeted dozens of congressmen. The investigation entailed FBI operatives posing as intermediaries for Saudi nationals hoping to bribe their way through the immigration process into the United States. Murtha met with these operatives and was videotaped. He did agree to testify against Frank Thompson (D-NJ) and John Murphy (D-NY), the two Congressmen mentioned as participants in the deal at the same meeting and who were later videotaped placing the cash bribes in their trousers. The FBI videotaped Murtha responding to an offer of $50,000, with Murtha saying, "I'm not interested... at this point. [If] we do business for a while, maybe I'll be interested, maybe I won't," right after Murtha had offered to provide names of businesses and banks in his district where money could be invested legally. The U.S. Attorney's Office reasoned that Murtha's intent was to obtain investment in his district. Full length viewing of the tape shows Murtha citing prospective investment opportunities that could return "500 or 1,000" miners to work.

Murtha dedicating the National Drug Intelligence Center in Johnstown, 1993

In 2002, Murtha managed Nancy Pelosi's campaign to become House Minority Whip, where she defeated Steny Hoyer. On June 9, 2006, Murtha informed Pelosi that he would run for House Majority Leader if the Democrats gained control of the House in the 2006 midterm elections. Despite Murtha receiving Pelosi's support, Hoyer was elected to the post. As the Democrats became the majority party in the House in 2007, Murtha re-assumed his chairmanship of the United States House Appropriations Subcommittee on Defense. He had previously chaired this subcommittee from 1989 to 1995 and served as its ranking member from 1995 to 2007.

On November 19, 2005, during debate on adopting the rule for the resolution, Congresswoman Jean Schmidt (R-Ohio) made a statement attributed to Danny Bubp, an Ohio state Representative and Marine Corps reservist. The statement, "He also asked me to give Congressman Murtha a message: that cowards cut and run; Marines never do," was seen as an unwarranted "cheap shot" against Murtha, and outraged Democrats brought House business to a halt for ten minutes until Schmidt herself asked and received permission to withdraw her comments. Bubp has since stated that he never mentioned Murtha when making the quoted comment. He added that he would never question the courage of a fellow Marine. Bubp later said, "I don't want to be interjected into this. I wish (Congresswoman Schmidt) never used my name."

In a speech at Florida International University on June 24, 2006, Murtha said that the military presence in Iraq was hurting U.S. credibility, citing a poll by the Pew Research Center indicating that people in several countries considered the U.S. in Iraq to be a greater threat to world peace than either Iran or North Korea. When the South Florida Sun-Sentinel reported the speech on June 25, it asserted without further evidence that it was Murtha's own view that the U.S. was a greater threat to world peace: "American presence in Iraq is more dangerous to world peace than nuclear threats from North Korea or Iran, U.S. Representative John Murtha, D-Pa., said to a crowd of more than 200 in North Miami Saturday afternoon."

The Sun-Sentinel story was picked up by the wire services and the Drudge Report website, leading several conservative pundits, including Bill O'Reilly, Tucker Carlson, and Newt Gingrich to comment. After the Sun-Sentinel issued a correction, O'Reilly publicly apologized.

On March 18, 2008, Murtha endorsed Hillary Clinton, former First Lady and then senator from New York, in her bid for the presidency. After having endorsed Clinton, commenting on the prospects for the election of Barack Obama during the 2008 presidential campaign, Murtha became the subject of controversy after deriding many of his own constituents as "racists" who would not vote for Obama because he is black. In response to the outrage at his comments, he apologized but then reiterated the point by saying, "[T]here's still folks that have a problem voting for someone because they are black. This whole area, years ago, was really redneck."

In 2009, Murtha heard details from Fort Benning U.S. Army soldiers on how their current uniforms and equipment were not providing camouflage in Iraq and Afghanistan during a personal visit. Murtha immediately took action and convinced the army to fix the camouflage problem, resulting in MultiCam being selected by the Secretary of the Army John McHugh for all incoming soldiers deploying to Afghanistan in 2010, only weeks after Murtha had died.

On February 6, 2010, two days before his death, Murtha became the longest-serving Pennsylvania congressman in history. Although he was not sworn into office until February 20, 1974, House of Representatives rules state that Murtha's service began at his election because the seat was vacant.

=== Views on the Iraq War ===
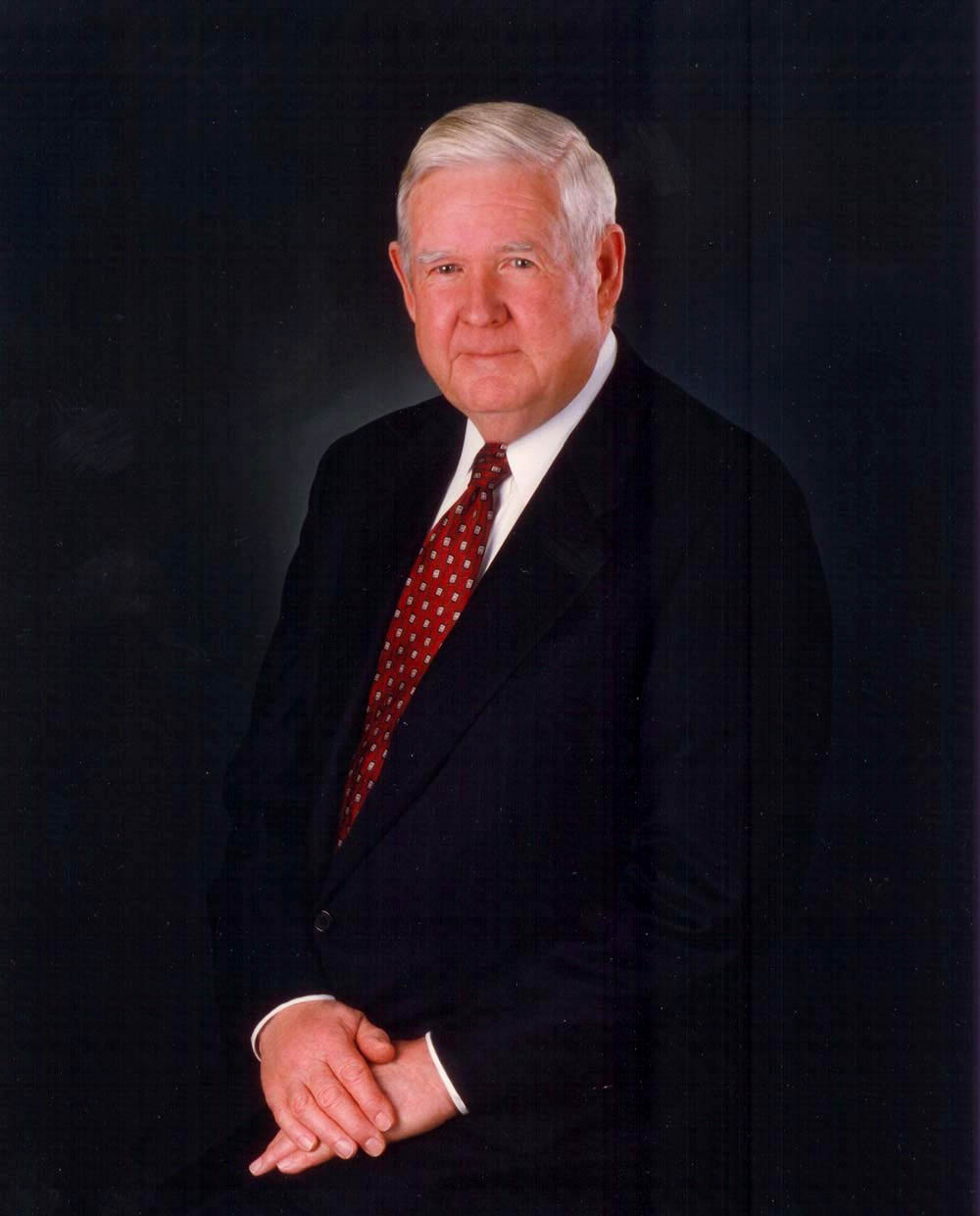
Murtha's portrait during the 109th Congress

Murtha voted for the October 2002 resolution that authorized the use of force against Iraq. However, he later began expressing doubts about the war. On March 17, 2004, when Republicans offered a "War in Iraq Anniversary Resolution" that "affirms that the United States and the world have been made safer with the removal of Saddam Hussein and his regime from power in Iraq," when J. D. Hayworth called for a recorded vote, Murtha voted against it.

Still, in early 2005 Murtha argued against the withdrawal of American troops from Iraq. "A premature withdrawal of our troops based on a political timetable could rapidly devolve into a civil war which would leave America's foreign policy in disarray as countries question not only America's judgment but also its perseverance," he stated.

On November 17, 2005, Murtha submitted H.J. Res. 73 in the House of Representatives, calling for the redeployment of U.S. troops in Iraq, saying, "The U.S. cannot accomplish anything further in Iraq militarily. It is time to bring them home."

The bill cited lack of progress towards stabilizing Iraq, the possibility that a draft would be required to sustain sufficient troop numbers, Iraqi disapproval of US forces and approval of attacks on the soldiers, and the increasing costs of the war. The bill proposed that deployment to Iraq be suspended and that US Marines establish an "over-the-horizon" presence in nearby countries.

Murtha's comments forced a heated debate on the floor of the House on November 18. Republicans led by Duncan Hunter of California, chairman of the House Armed Services Committee, responded by proposing their own resolution (H. Res. 571), which many Republicans said was intended to demonstrate that those calling for immediate troop withdrawal from Iraq were "out of the mainstream." Murtha himself took the floor during debate on the resolution after the Democrats yielded all their time to him, and denounced the Hunter resolution as a sham. As expected, Hunter's resolution was defeated, with only three congressmen voting aye.

In 2006, after Murtha became a leading critic of the Iraq War, a conservative website, the Cybercast News Service (part of L. Brent Bozell III's Media Research Center) published an article that "quoted Murtha opponents as questioning the circumstances surrounding the awarding of his two Purple Hearts." The attack recalled the "swiftboating" tactic used against Senator John Kerry two years early. A Murtha spokesman called the allegations "an attempt to distract attention from what's happening in Iraq."

=== Haditha killings ===
The Haditha killings occurred on November 19, 2005. Murtha announced that a military investigation into the Haditha killings had concluded that U.S. Marines had intentionally killed innocent civilians. Referring to the first report about Haditha in Time magazine, Murtha said:

It's much worse than reported in Time magazine. There was no firefight. There was no IED that killed these innocent people. Our troops overreacted because of the pressure on them and they killed innocent civilians in cold blood. And that's what the report is going to tell.

The Marine Corps responded to Murtha's announcement by stating that "there is an ongoing investigation; therefore, any comment at this time would be inappropriate and could undermine the investigatory and possible legal process." Murtha was criticized by conservatives for presenting a version of events as simple fact before an official investigation had been concluded.

In August 2006, Staff Sergeant Frank Wuterich filed a lawsuit against Murtha for character defamation during an ongoing investigation into the Haditha incident. In April 2009 this suit was dismissed by a federal appeals court, which ruled that Murtha could not be sued because he was acting in his official role as a lawmaker when he made the statements.

On December 21, 2006, the US military charged Wuterich with 12 counts of unpremeditated murder against individuals and one count of the murder of six people "while engaged in an act inherently dangerous to others." Charges were subsequently dropped against seven of the eight Marines involved: Capt. Lucas McConnell, Lt. Col. Jeffrey Chessani, Sgt. Sanick Dela Cruz, Lance Corporal Stephen Tatum, Lance Corporal Justin Sharratt, Capt. Randy Stone, and 1st Lt. Andrew Grayson. Only Staff Sergeant Frank Wuterich still faced trial on 9 counts of involuntary manslaughter, and in 2012 as part of a plea deal he pleaded guilty to one count of negligent dereliction of duty.

=== Earmarks and campaign contributions ===
Murtha was targeted by Citizens for Responsibility and Ethics in Washington as one of the 20 most corrupt members of Congress.

In September 2006, the Citizens for Responsibility and Ethics in Washington (CREW) listed Murtha under Five Members to Watch in its Second Annual Most Corrupt Members of Congress Report. The report cited Murtha's steering of defense appropriations to clients of KSA Consulting, which employed his brother Robert, and the PMA Group, founded by Paul Magliocchetti, a former senior staffer on the Appropriations Committee Subcommittee on Defense.

In 2008, Esquire Magazine named him one of the 10 worst members of Congress because of his opposition to ethics reform and the $100 million a year he brought to his district in earmarks. The Wall Street Journal has called him "one of Congress's most unapologetic earmarkers." According to the Pennsylvania Report, Murtha was one of "Pennsylvania's most powerful congressmen" and a "master of crossing the aisle and bringing pork into his district."

In February 2009, CQ Politics reported that Murtha was one of 104 U.S. representatives to earmark funds in the 2008 Defense appropriations spending bill for a lobbying group that had contributed to his past election campaigns. The spending bill, which was managed by Murtha in his capacity as chairman of the House Appropriations Subcommittee on Defense, secured $38.1 million for clients of the PMA Group in the single fiscal law. The PMA Group was under investigation by the FBI.

In March 2009, the Washington Post reported that a Pennsylvania defense research center regularly consulted with two "handlers" close to Murtha while it received nearly $250 million in federal funding via Murtha's earmarks. The center then channeled a significant portion of the funding to companies that were among Murtha's campaign supporters.

== Political views ==
Murtha was a moderate-to-conservative democrat. Murtha generally opposed gun control, earning an "A" rating from the NRA Political Victory Fund.

In 2004, he was one of only two congressmen to vote for a measure proposing reinstatement of the draft.

Murtha voted for the Affordable Healthcare for America Act (HR 3692), which passed the House 220–215 on November 7, 2009. He said of the bill, "For nearly a century, both Democrats and Republicans have failed to enact comprehensive health care reform. Today's historic vote moves us closer to solving America's health care crisis." However, Murtha did not support allowing abortions as part of health care reform. He voted for the Stupak–Pitts Amendment to the health care bill that prohibits elective abortions for people covered by the public healthcare plan and to prohibit people receiving federal assistance from purchasing a private healthcare plan that includes abortions, except when the woman's life is in danger. He also voted for a bill to prohibit pregnant minors from crossing state borders to obtain abortions.

In August 2009, Murtha refused Republican challenger Tim Burns' invitation to attend a town hall meeting focused on healthcare (at the time, Murtha had not yet hosted a town hall meeting); however, Murtha had held several conference call sessions with his constituents focused on healthcare.

Murtha, an anti-abortion Democrat, did not receive favorable ratings from abortion and reproductive health interest groups. Planned Parenthood, whose stated purpose is "to provide comprehensive reproductive and complementary health care," gave him a rating of 50% in 2009. He received a rating of 50% from the National Family Planning and Reproductive Health Association, which advocates "access to voluntary, comprehensive and culturally sensitive family planning and reproductive health care services and... reproductive freedom for all".

== Personal life ==
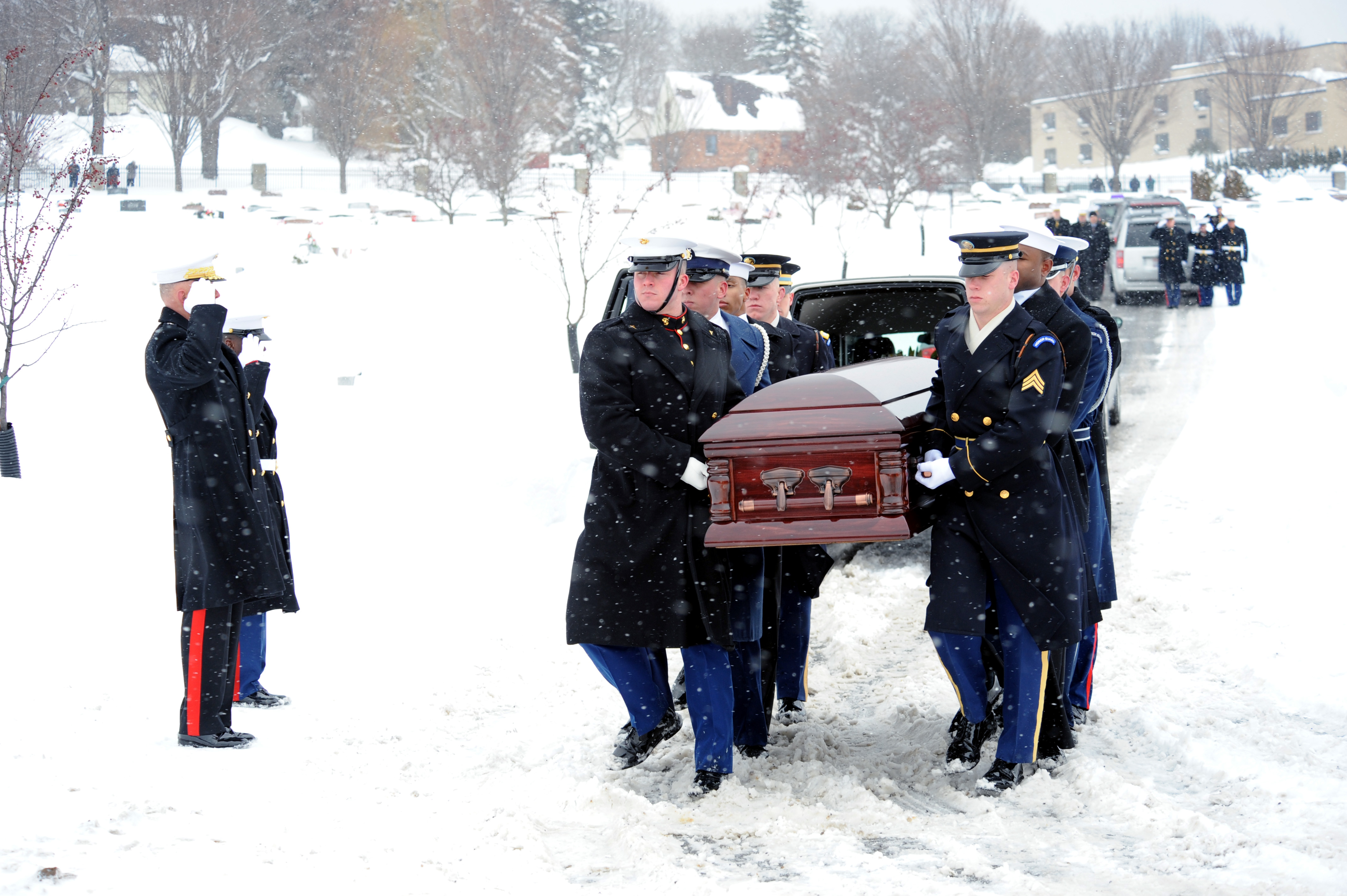
A joint service honor guard bearing the casket of John P. Murtha; Johnstown Pennsylvania, February 16, 2010

Murtha married his wife Joyce on June 10, 1955. They had three children: a daughter, Donna, and twin sons, Patrick and John M., who live in Johnstown. In 2006, Murtha received the John F. Kennedy Profile in Courage Award and the Scripps Howard Super Sage Award in a coin flip with Vince Neil, Motley Crue's lead singer. Murtha and Neil both predicted Pittsburgh would beat Seattle, 21-7, in Super Bowl XL. The actual final score was Pittsburgh, 21-10. Their predictions were the closest out of 100 participants in the Scripps Howard Celebrity Super Bowl Poll.

Murtha was first hospitalized with gallbladder problems for a few days in December 2009 and had surgery on January 28, 2010, at Bethesda Naval Hospital. Longtime friend and fellow Pennsylvania Democratic representative Bob Brady said Murtha's large intestine was damaged during the normally routine laparoscopic surgery, causing an infection. Due to the complication, Murtha was again hospitalized two days later, and died on the afternoon of February 8, 2010, in the Virginia Hospital Center in Arlington, Virginia, with his family by his side. He was buried on February 16, 2010, at Grandview Cemetery in Johnstown, Pennsylvania.

Speaker of the House Nancy Pelosi said in a statement on the day of his death, "With the passing of John Murtha, America has lost a great patriot." House Republican Leader John Boehner said, "Our nation has lost a decorated veteran."

On April 9, 2010, Secretary of the Navy Ray Mabus signed an official memo to the Chief of Naval Operations, designating the naming of an amphibious transport dock (LPD), a type of naval warship, as the USS John P. Murtha (LPD-26). The Navy Times said the official announcement "added fuel to an already smoldering backlash online."

In October 2011, it was revealed that the FBI had investigated Murtha for possible ethics violations. No charges were ever filed.

A special election was held to fill the seat left vacant by the late congressman, taking place on May 18 to coincide with that state's primaries for Senate and governor. The Democratic candidate, Mark Critz, defeated Republican candidate Tim Burns to win Murtha's seat.

The University of Pittsburgh houses the John P. Murtha Congressional Papers containing the documentation of Representative Murtha and his duties while in office. The collection contains correspondence, legislative files, reports, subjects covering the Defense Department, the Department of the Interior, economic development, energy, and labor. The collection also contains photographic and audio-video materials, memorabilia, and awards. The John Murtha Johnstown–Cambria County Airport is also named after the congressman.

== See also ==
- 2010 Pennsylvania's 12th congressional district special election
- List of members of the United States Congress who died in office (2000–present)#2010s

Pennsylvania House of Representatives
Preceded by Edward McNally; Elect	Member of the Pennsylvania House of Representatives from the 72nd district 1969–1973	Succeeded by James Whelan
U.S. House of Representatives
Preceded by John Saylor	Member of the U.S. House of Representatives from Pennsylvania's 12th congressional district 1974–2010	Succeeded by Mark Critz
