= East Conemaugh, Pennsylvania =

Borough in Pennsylvania, US

- Borough
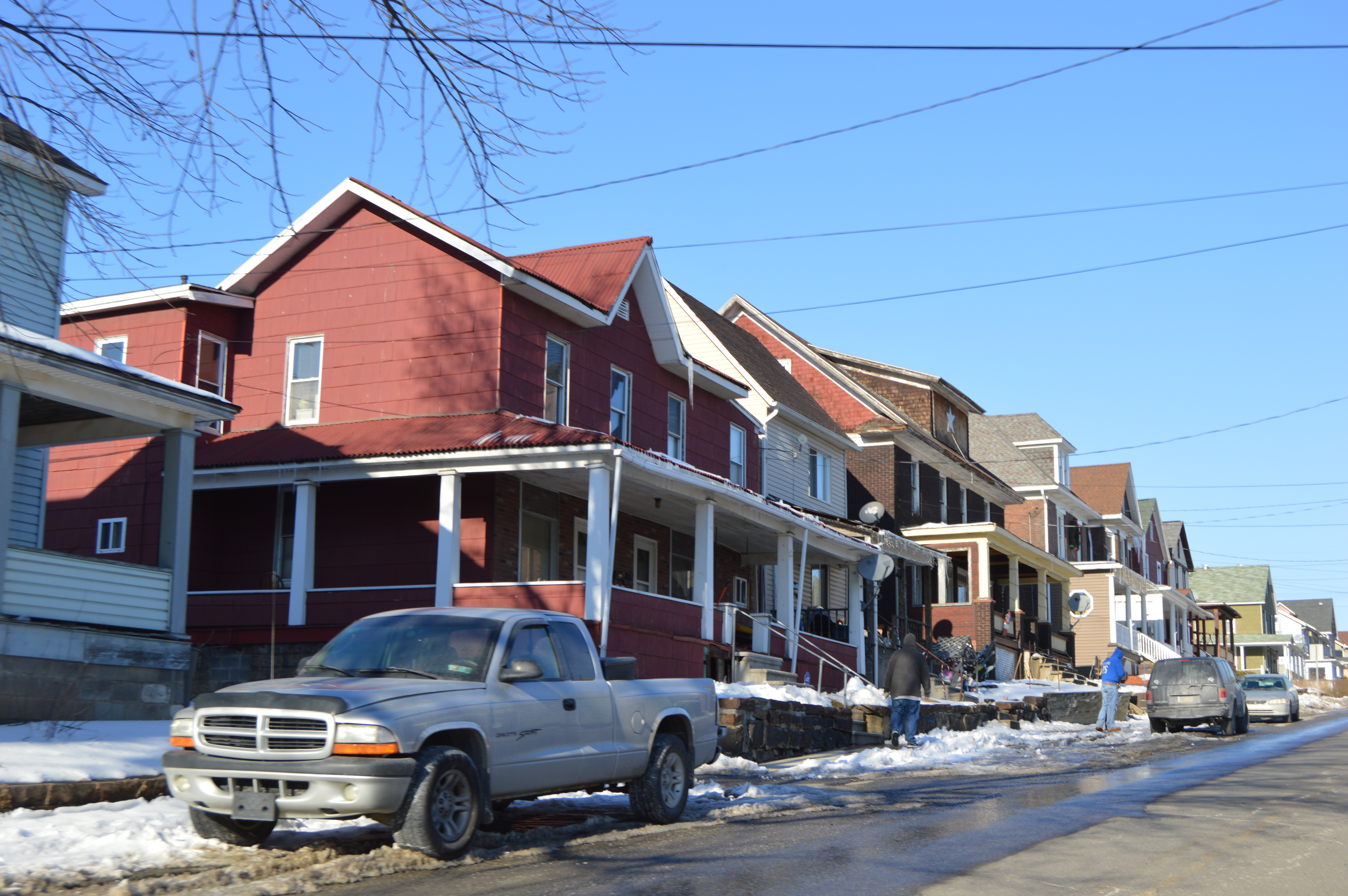
- Houses on Second Street

- Location of East Conemaugh in Cambria County, Pennsylvania.

- Location within Pennsylvania
- Coordinates: 40°20′51″N 78°53′09″W
- Country: United States
- State: Pennsylvania
- County: Cambria
- Incorporated: 1868

Government
  - Type: Borough council

Area
  - Total: 0.28 sq mi (0.72 km^{2})
  - Land: 0.27 sq mi (0.71 km^{2})
  - Water: 0.0039 sq mi (0.01 km^{2})
- Elevation: 1,243 ft (379 m)

Population (2020)
  - Total: 1,082
  - Density: 3,920.2/sq mi (1,513.59/km^{2})
- Time zone: UTC-5 (Eastern (EST))
  - Summer (DST): UTC-4 (EDT)
- ZIP code: 15909
- Area code: 814
- FIPS code: 42-20992
- GNIS feature ID: 1215017
- Website: https://eastconemaughpa.com/

East Conemaugh is a borough in Cambria County, Pennsylvania, United States. It is part of the Johnstown, Pennsylvania Metropolitan Statistical Area. As of the 2020 census, East Conemaugh had a population of 1,082.

== Geography ==
East Conemaugh is located in southwestern Cambria County at 40°20′51″N 78°53′9″W (40.347523, −78.885799), in the valley of the Little Conemaugh River. It is bordered to the southeast, across the river, by the borough of Franklin. The center of Johnstown is 3 miles (5 km) to the southwest (downstream).

According to the United States Census Bureau, East Conemaugh has a total area of 0.27 square miles (0.7 km^{2}), of which 0.008 square miles (0.02 km^{2}), or 2.46%, is water.

== Demographics ==
Historical population
Census	Pop.	Note	%±
1880	756		—
1890	1,158		53.2%
1900	2,175		87.8%
1910	5,046		132.0%
1920	5,256		4.2%
1930	4,979		−5.3%
1940	4,810		−3.4%
1950	4,101		−14.7%
1960	3,334		−18.7%
1970	2,710		−18.7%
1980	2,128		−21.5%
1990	1,470		−30.9%
2000	1,291		−12.2%
2010	1,220		−5.5%
2020	1,082		−11.3%

As of the census of 2000, there were 1,291 people, 588 households, and 365 families residing in the borough. The population density was 4,588.9 inhabitants per square mile (1,771.8/km^{2}). There were 679 housing units at an average density of 2,413.5 per square mile (931.9/km^{2}). The racial makeup of the borough was 95.97% White, 3.33% African American, 0.15% Pacific Islander, and 0.54% from two or more races. Hispanic or Latino of any race were 1.24% of the population.

There were 588 households, out of which 23.3% had children under the age of 18 living with them, 42.9% were married couples living together, 14.3% had a female householder with no husband present, and 37.8% were non-families. 35.0% of all households were made up of individuals, and 20.1% had someone living alone who was 65 years of age or older. The average household size was 2.20 and the average family size was 2.84.

In the borough the population was spread out, with 19.3% under the age of 18, 7.1% from 18 to 24, 24.7% from 25 to 44, 23.7% from 45 to 64, and 25.2% who were 65 years of age or older. The median age was 44 years. For every 100 females there were 83.1 males. For every 100 females age 18 and over, there were 79.0 males.

The median income for a household in the borough was $23,478, and the median income for a family was $30,357. Males had a median income of $23,529 versus $19,479 for females. The per capita income for the borough was $12,636. About 18.3% of families and 21.1% of the population were below the poverty line, including 42.9% of those under age 18 and 8.0% of those age 65 or over.

== Sports and leisure ==
The borough has been the home of the Conemaugh Valley Youth League (known prior to 1987 as "East Conemaugh Youth League") baseball and softball programs since 1968. While both programs are run by CVYL, baseball belongs to the Little League of Johnstown (since 2015), and softball plays in the Cambria-Somerset Fastpitch Softball League (since 2001). The league's baseball program is sanctioned by Little League, through West Suburban Little League.

In 2008, East Conemaugh Borough Council gave the league the green light to explore lighting options due to the rise in participation numbers. Just two years later, CVYL began playing night games, thanks to a $20,000 grant through the State of Pennsylvania and various other donors.
