= Brandywine Asset Management =

American investment management firm

Brandywine Asset Management, Inc.
- Type: Private
- Industry: Investment Management
- Founded: 1982
- Founder: Michael Dever
- Headquarters: Thornton, Pennsylvania, United States
- Key people: Michael Dever
- Website: www.brandywine.com

Brandywine Asset Management, Inc. is an American investment management firm founded and managed by Michael Dever. The firm is registered as a commodity trading advisor.

== History ==
Michael Dever began personal discretionary trading in 1979.

Dever founded Brandywine Asset Management, Inc. in 1982, and Brandywine continued trading futures on a discretionary basis.

In the 1980s, Dever began developing computer studies on commodity price behavior. The basic research and portfolio modeling concepts Brandywine uses today were developed through a major research project conducted from 1987 to 1991 using staff researchers and students and faculty from several universities, including the Wharton School of the University of Pennsylvania, Villanova University, and West Chester University. The purpose of these studies was to test all of the ideas that Dever had accumulated to determine if they were statistically valid.

Beginning in 1989, Brandywine developed the Brandywine Benchmark Program, which Brandywine traded 1991–1998. The Brandywine Benchmark Program was a broadly diversified, fully computerized program, which incorporated trend-following, seasonal, arbitrage, and fundamentally based strategies. The Brandywine Benchmark Program stopped trading in late 1998 as Dever began to focus on his venture development business.

Dever is a pioneer in risk management and is credited with the development of one of the earliest comprehensive risk management models. In the 1980s, he developed a statistically based money management and risk allocation model. The purpose of the model was to allocate weightings equally to the strategies and markets within a portfolio in order to maintain balance of returns from all strategy-market combinations. The intent of this portfolio allocation model is to ensure that no single market or strategy-market combination dominates the portfolio over an extended period of time. During the years 1999–2007, Brandywine traded multiple strategies and programs, including mutual fund arbitrage, market neutral equity, long-short equity, and futures strategies. In addition, Brandywine's allocation to venture capital investing grew to over 50% of its business.

Brandywine believes in the dynamic nature of markets and the importance of taking an active approach to research. The firm is built on a structure and a philosophy that requires continuous identification and development of new strategies for portfolio diversification.

The offices of Brandywine are located in an award-winning renovated 17th-century grist mill in the Brandywine Valley, outside of Philadelphia, Pennsylvania. The mill renovation project, which includes an actual reconstructed operating mill waterwheel, was designed by Thomas Dever, principal of Dever Architects and brother of Michael. The project was awarded a 1997 Building Excellence Award by the Philadelphia Business Journal.

== Investment funds ==
Brandywine handles long-term investments, using a multi-strategy approach which includes diversification and non-correlation of strategies and markets. Brandywine's strategizes on "return drivers" to trade portfolios in the global currency, interest rate, stock index, metals, energy, and agricultural sectors. It incorporates as many diversified return drivers as possible in the portfolio so that not all are subject to the same external events.

| Funds | Vintage Year | Capital ($m) |
|---|---|---|
| FTGF Brandywine Global Fixed Income Fund | 2007 | $61.58 |
| FTGF Brandywine Global Opportunistic Fixed Income Fund | 2011 | $174.82 |
| FTGF Brandywine Global Income Optimiser Fund | 2013 | $926.34 |
| FTGF Brandywine Global Credit Opportunities Fund | 2014 | $10.61 |
