= George Morris Philips =

American educator and academic administrator (1851–1920)

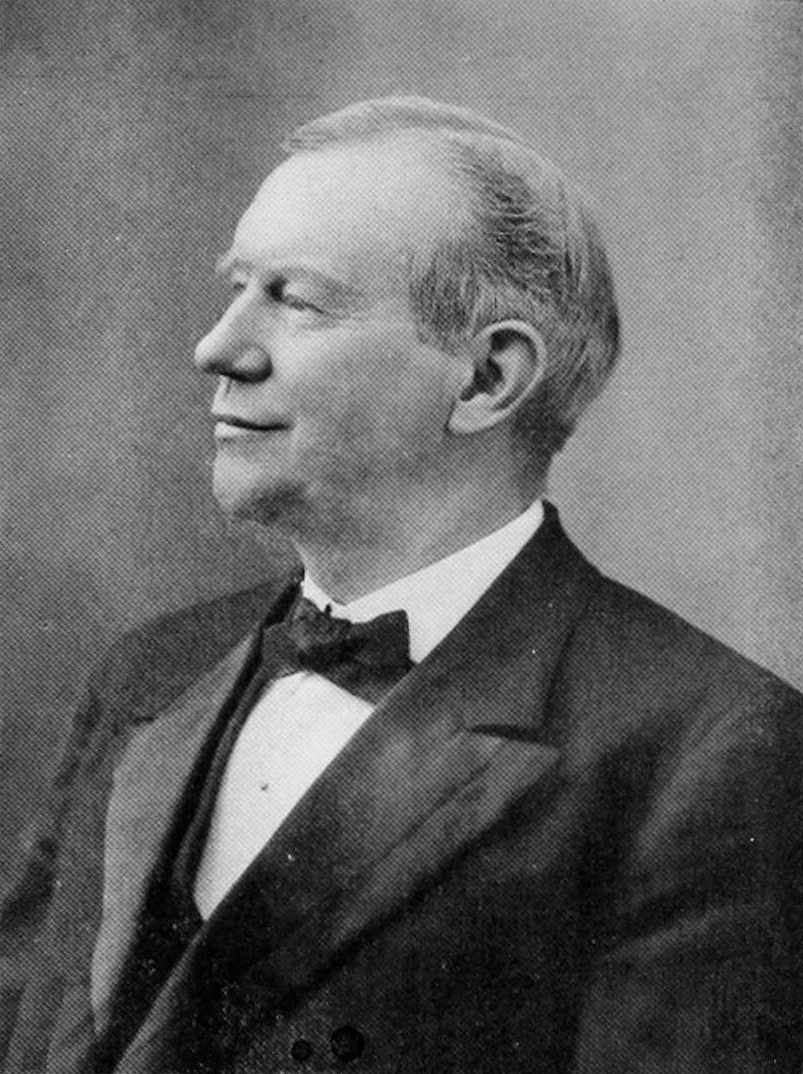
- Philips in 1913
- Born: October 28, 1851; Atglen, Pennsylvania, US
- Died: March 11, 1920 (aged 68); Philadelphia, Pennsylvania
- Resting place: Oaklands Cemetery
- Education: Bucknell University (AB, AM, PhD); Temple University (LLD)
- Occupation(s): Educator, academic administrator
- Title: Principal of West Chester State Normal School
- Term: 1881–1920
- Predecessor: George L. Maris
- Successor: Andrew Thomas Smith
- Relatives: Thomas J. Philips (brother)

George Morris Philips (October 28, 1851 – March 11, 1920) was an American educator and academic administrator who was the longest-serving principal of West Chester State Normal School (now West Chester University of Pennsylvania) from 1881 to 1920. A professor of mathematics who taught at West Chester and Bucknell University, Philips also authored several textbooks, rewrote Pennsylvania's school code, and served as president of the Chester County Historical Society.

== Early life and education ==
Philips was born in Atglen, Chester County, Pennsylvania, on October 28, 1851, to parents John Morris and Sarah (Jones) Philips. His ancestors had immigrated to Chester County from Pembrokeshire, Wales, in 1755 and 1712, respectively.

Raised on his family's farm, Philips attended Atglen High School. He received his Bachelor of Arts with high honors in 1871 and his Master of Arts in 1874. Both degrees were in mathematics from Bucknell University (Lewisburg University until 1886). He received his Doctor of Philosophy (PhD) from Bucknell in 1884 and Doctor of Laws (LLD) from Temple University in 1906.

== Academic career ==
Philips worked as a professor of mathematics at Monongahela College (1871–1873), professor of higher mathematics at West Chester State Normal School (1873–1878), professor of mathematics and astronomy at Bucknell University (1878–1881), and principal of the West Chester State Normal School from 1881 until his death in 1920 (West Chester finally introduced the office of president in 1927). Student enrollment and campus infrastructure and capital grew substantially during his tenure. New buildings included an addition to Old Main (1889), a gymnasium (1890), the principal's house (1891), Recitation Hall (1892), the "Sanitarium" (1892), the "Model School (now Ruby Jones Hall; 1899), the Old Library (1902), Wayne Hall (1911), and more.

In 1913, Philips faced charges of covering up inappropriate behavior by the school's steward, Harry S. Johnson, toward female staff and students. In the most disturbing such incident, the married Johnson impregnated a student, Ruth M. Wolfe, and paid her medical bills after an unsuccessful abortion before eloping with her. In September 1913, trustees voted to demand Philips' resignation, but protests by alumni and intervention by the State of Board Education restored him to office despite the scandal.

Philips was dedicated to West Chester and declined offers of higher-profile employment, including the presidency of Bucknell University in 1888 and the position of Pennsylvania State Superintendent of Public Instruction in 1899. Dedicated in 1927, Philips Memorial Building on the West Chester University campus was named in the principal's honor. This building houses the president's office, a concert hall, and the Philips Autographed Library of over 2,000 volumes collected by Philips and donated to the institution by his son in 1952. The George Morris Philips Society is a giving society for donors who include West Chester University Foundation in their estate plans.

== Civic service ==
Philips held no elected offices but assumed numerous civic and professional leadership positions. He served as president of the Teachers Association of Pennsylvania in 1891, vice president of the National Educational Association in 1894 and 1910, member of the college and University Council of Pennsylvania from 1895 to 1911, trustee of Bucknell University, board member of the Bank of Chester County, vice president of the Dime Savings Bank of Chester County, board member of Chester Count Hospital, and board member of the American Baptist Publication Society. He served as president of the Chester County Historical Society from 1894 to 1920 and served as secretary of the state commission that rewrote the Pennsylvania School Codes between 1907 and 1911 (the legislature approved the revision in 1911). He subsequently helped guide the Pennsylvania Department of Education's acquisition of the state's independent normal schools, including West Chester.

== Publications ==
Philips authored or coauthored textbooks on arithmetic, astronomy, natural philosophy, government, and Pennsylvania.

- Sharpless, Isaac; Philips, G. M. (1882). Astronomy for Schools and General Readers. Philadelphia: J.B. Lippincott & Co. OCLC 1827449.
- Sharpless, Isaac; Philips, G. M. (1883). Natural Philosophy. Lippincott's science series. Philadelphia: J.B. Lippincott & Co. OCLC 609857062.
- Philips, G. M. (1893). Elements of Civil Government in the Commonwealth of Pennsylvania. New York: Silver, Burdett & Co. OCLC 775852328.
- Philips, G. M. (1905). Nation and State: A Text-book on Civil Government. Philadelphia: C. Sower Co. OCLC 905792634.
- Philips, G. M.; Anderson, Robert F. (1912). The Silver-Burdett Arithmetics. Boston: Silver, Burdett and Co. OCLC 971727.
- Philips, G. M.; Anderson, Robert F. (1915). Course of study in arithmetic: for grades below the high school. New York: Silver, Burdett & Co. OCLC 646248279.

== Personal life ==
Philips married Elizabeth Marshall on December 27, 1877, and had two children: William Pyle Philips (born June 29, 1882) and Sara Elizabeth Philips (born February 16, 1887). He belonged to the First Baptist Church of West Chester. His brother was Pennsylvania representative Thomas J. Philips.

After suffering a stroke six days earlier on the way home from a school dinner, Philips died at the Hospital of the University of Pennsylvania in Philadelphia on March 11, 1920, at the age of 68. He was buried at Oaklands Cemetery.
