= Chris Asplen =

DNA policy expert with extensive U.S. federal/state/international experience

- Born: Bucks County, Pennsylvania
- Education: West Chester University; Penn State University
- Occupation: DNA policy expert

Chris Asplen is an American DNA policy expert with extensive U.S. federal, state and international experience.

== Early career ==
Chris Asplen was born and raised in Bucks County, Pennsylvania. He graduated from West Chester University in 1986. After graduating from The Dickinson School of Law of Penn State University, he returned to Bucks County as an Assistant District Attorney to specialize in the prosecution of sex crimes and child abuse. He is recognized as one of the foremost legal experts on forensic DNA technology.

After leaving the Bucks County District Attorneys Office, Asplen became the Director of the DNA Legal Assistance Unit for the American Prosecutor's Research Institute and the National District Attorney's Association in Alexandria, Virginia. As Director of the DNA Unit, he developed prosecutor training courses not only for DNA unit but also for Domestic Violence and Child Abuse Units. He also taught extensively in the area of Domestic violence.

== US Attorney's Office, Department of Justice and White House ==
In 1997, Asplen was appointed Assistant United States Attorney for the US Attorney's Office in Washington, D.C., and worked in the Domestic/Family Violence Unit.

In 1997 Asplen was also appointed as the Executive Director of the National Commission on the Future of DNA Evidence. The Commission's mission was to “Maximize the potential of DNA technology in the criminal justice system.” The Commission consisted of national and international experts in areas of law enforcement, science, legal...

In 2000 he was appointed Team Leader for the White House Office of Science and Technology Policy, White House Initiative on Law Enforcement Technology, representing the Department of Justice's Office of Science and Technology Policy. In 2006 he was hired by the Department of Justice as the Chief Faculty Member for the President's Initiative on DNA's Training for Officers of the Court.

== London career ==
Upon leaving the United States Department of Justice, Asplen joined the firm of Gordon Thomas Honeywell (originally Smith Alling Lane) and opened the firm's London office. Gordon Thomas Honeywell has contracts with Life Technologies, a leading provider of forensic DNA testing equipment and services. From London, he consulted with the US National Institute of Justice, foreign governments and other law enforcement agencies on the establishment and implementation of DNA databases as well as crime scene investigation. He has worked with the governments of the United Kingdom, Italy, South Africa, the Philippines, China, India, Kenya, Croatia, Serbia, Russia, Chile, the Netherlands and several more. He is also a member of the International Association of Prosecutors.
