= Mary Ann Arty =

American politician

Member of the Pennsylvania House of Representatives from the 165th district
- In office 1979–1988
- Preceded by: Thomas J. Stapleton, Jr.
- Succeeded by: Bill Adolph

Personal details
- Born: November 24, 1926 Philadelphia, Pennsylvania
- Died: October 26, 2000 (aged 73) Bradenton, Florida
- Party: Republican

Mary Ann Arty-Majors (November 24, 1926 – October 26, 2000) was an American politician from Pennsylvania who served as a Republican member of the Pennsylvania House of Representatives for the 165th district from 1979 to 1988.

== Early life and education ==
Arty was born in Philadelphia, Pennsylvania. She graduated from Philadelphia High School for Girls in 1944. She received a R.N degree from the Medical College of Pennsylvania in 1947 and a B.S. from West Chester State College (now West Chester University) in 1966.

== Career ==
Arty was elected to the Pennsylvania House of Representatives for the 165th district in 1978 and was reelected to 4 consecutive terms. She was not a candidate for reelection in 1988.

She was elected to the Delaware County Council and served from 1989 to 1996 including as chair from 1991 to 1996. She worked as the director of Delaware County Human Services from 1996 to 1998.
