= Thomas J. Stapleton =

American politician

Member of the Pennsylvania House of Representatives from the 165th district
- In office 1975–1978
- Preceded by: Donald McCurdy
- Succeeded by: Mary Ann Arty

Personal details
- Born: Thomas J. Stapleton Jr. January 6, 1947 (age 79) Philadelphia, Pennsylvania, U.S.
- Party: Democratic

Thomas J. Stapleton Jr. (born January 6, 1947) is an American politician from Pennsylvania who served as a Democratic member of the Pennsylvania House of Representatives for the 165th district from 1975 to 1978.

== Early life and education ==
Stapleton was born in Philadelphia, Pennsylvania and graduated from Monsignor Bonner High School. He received a B.A. in political science from Niagara University in 1968 and a J.D. from Villanova University School of Law in 1972.

== Career ==
Stapleton was elected to the Pennsylvania House of Representatives for the 165th district and served from 1975 to 1978. He had an unsuccessful candidacy for reelection to the House in 1979, losing to Mary Ann Arty.
