= Michael Dever =

American businessman (born 1957)

Michael P. Dever
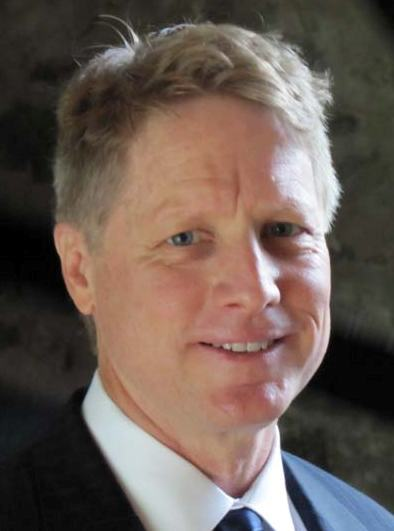
- Born: May 20, 1957 (age 69); Cleveland, Ohio, US
- Education: West Chester University
- Occupations: Trader; Businessman
- Spouse: Kim
- Children: 3

Michael Dever is an American businessman, futures trader, and author. Dever is the founder and CEO of Brandywine Asset Management, Inc., an investment management firm founded in 1982, and he is the author of the investment book "Jackass Investing: Don't do it. Profit from it."

== Business life ==
Dever began personal discretionary trading in 1979. He has been a trader and an investor for more than 30 years.

Dever was an early investor with Paul Tudor Jones and John W. Henry.

For over three decades, Dever has managed investments for global banks, corporations, and high-net-worth individuals, applying his investment philosophy to asset management.

=== Brandywine Asset Management, Inc. ===
Dever founded Brandywine Asset Management, Inc. in 1982.

He began developing computer studies on commodity price behavior in the 1980s. The basic research and portfolio modeling concepts he uses today were developed through a major research project conducted by Brandywine from 1987 to 1991 using staff researchers and students and faculty from several universities, including the Wharton School of the University of Pennsylvania, Villanova University, and West Chester University. The purpose of these studies was to test all of the ideas that Dever had accumulated to determine if they were statistically valid.

Brandywine implements a multi-strategy approach. Brandywine's philosophy is to create a relatively hedged portfolio, not by buying hedges which cost a premium but by incorporating multiple trading strategies in the portfolio which complement each other. Brandywine follows a methodology based on "return drivers" to trade broadly diversified portfolios in the global currency, interest rate, stock index, metals, energy, and agricultural futures markets. A return driver is the core underlying reason that drives the price of a market. Each strategy must have a high significance of occurring in the future.

Brandywine's trading approach is fundamentally based yet systematically applied.

Brandywine's trading focuses solely on futures because Dever believes that futures offer the broadest diversification with one investment type. In addition, futures are traded with lower transaction costs than stocks, so an investment manager can get much greater diversification with a relatively small number of futures markets than is possible in the stock market.

The offices of Brandywine are located in an award-winning renovated 17th-century grist mill in the Brandywine Valley, outside of Philadelphia, Pennsylvania. The mill renovation project, which includes an actual reconstructed operating mill waterwheel, was designed by Thomas Dever, principal of Dever Architects and brother of Michael. The project was awarded a 1997 Building Excellence Award by the Philadelphia Business Journal.

=== Venture development ===
Dever is an internet entrepreneur. He founded Mind Drivers LLC, a venture development company which operates technology businesses, in 2000. He spent most of the decade of the 2000s founding and operating technology-related businesses.

Dever founded Spree.com, an early e-commerce site, in 1996. He served as president and CEO. Spree.com pioneered the use of viral and affiliate marketing to grow into the world's 7th most-trafficked e-commerce company.

== Trading philosophy ==
Dever's trading philosophy is based on broad strategy and market diversification.

Dever is a pioneer in risk management and is credited with the development of one of the earliest comprehensive risk management models. In the 1980s, he developed a statistically based money management and risk allocation model. The purpose of the model was to allocate weightings equally to the strategies and markets within a portfolio in order to maintain balance of returns from all strategy-market combinations. The intent of this portfolio allocation model is to ensure that no single market or strategy-market combination dominates the portfolio over an extended period of time. Since that time, elements of this trading model have become popularized as risk parity investing.

True diversification can only be achieved by diversifying across return drivers and trading strategies, not asset classes. Most investors are taught to build a portfolio based on asset classes (such as stocks and bonds) and to hold the positions for the long term. According to Dever, this approach is the equivalent of gambling.

Dever focuses on the permanence of trading strategies and seeks to develop strategies with a strong probability of remaining valid over time (a generation or more). Dever does not have confidence in short term, technically driven strategies because he believes these strategies are not based on sound return drivers and, in most cases, are random.

A trading strategy has two components: a system that exploits a return driver and a market that is best suited to capture the returns promised by the return driver.

Dever's investment process is based on the scientific method and includes the following primary elements:

- Start by identifying a return driver.
- Develop the concept into a trading strategy.
- Test the trading strategy across many markets and time frames.
- Combine hundreds of different strategy-market combinations into a diversified portfolio.

Dever emphasizes the need to minimize event risk. Diversified portfolios are subject to far lower event risk than conventional portfolios. Leverage can even be added to a diversified portfolio, and the diversified portfolio would still have less event risk and volatility than a conventional portfolio allocated to stocks (60%) and bonds (40%). Dever's philosophy is to incorporate as many diversified return drivers as possible in the portfolio so that they are not all subject to the same external events. But there is always the risk of loss, regardless of the amount of diversification.

Dever believes that drawdowns are the largest impediment to strong, positive returns over time.

== Book ==
Dever is the author of the best-selling investment book "Jackass Investing: Don't do it. Profit from it."

"Jackass Investing" is a book that challenges conventional investment wisdom and presents an entirely new system of thought. The book describes 20 common investment myths and explains why each is a myth and not a fact.

The definition of "Jackass Investing" is taking unnecessary risk.

The book was published in 2011, but Dever initially developed the idea for the book in 1999. He decided to write "Jackass Investing" to systematically refute major investment myths by presenting the truth. He believes that most investment professionals preach similar "myths" that prohibit investors from creating truly diversified portfolios.
