= Philips Memorial Building =

- U.S. National Register of Historic Places
- U.S. Historic district – Contributing property
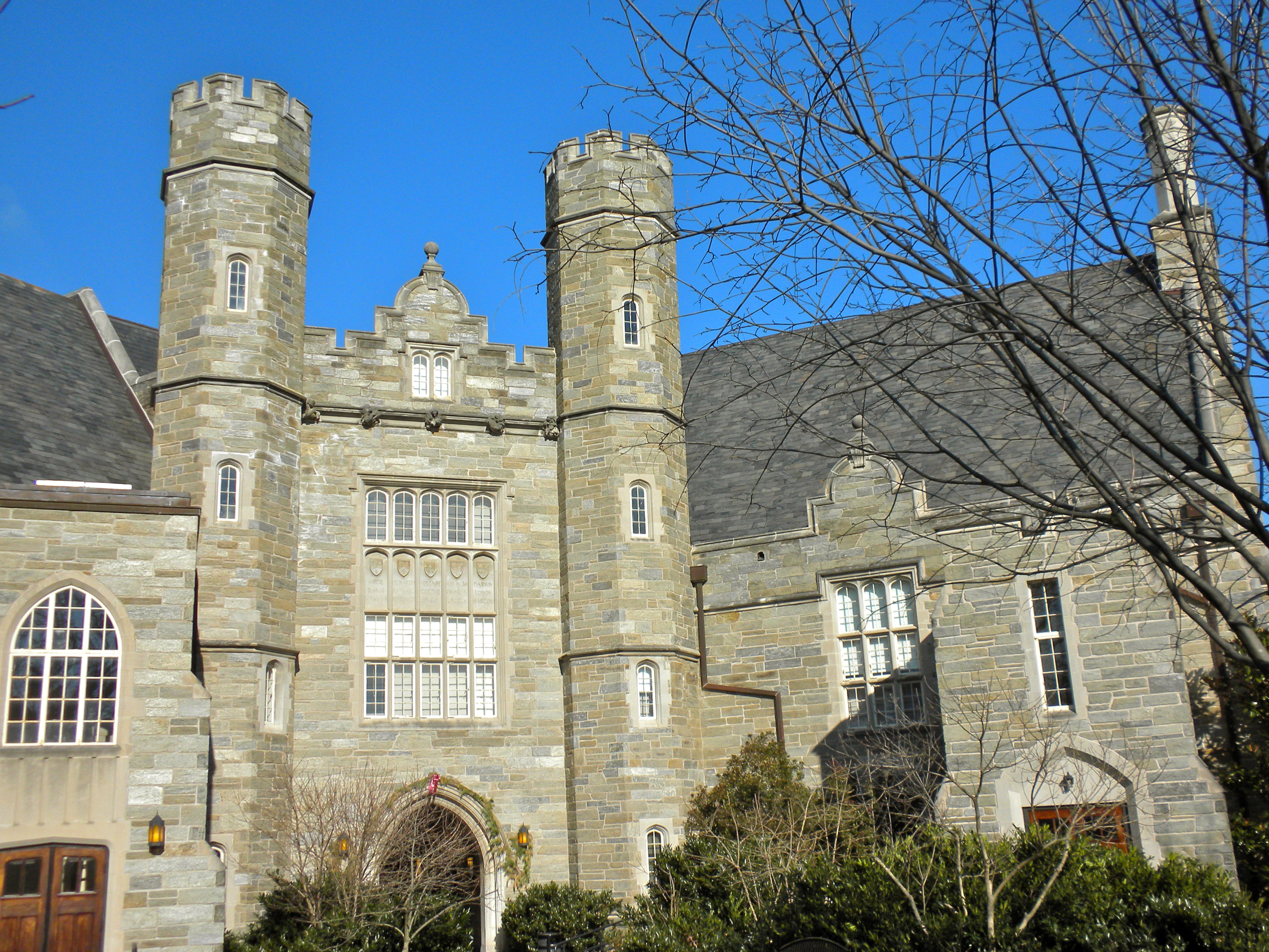
- Philips Memorial Building

- Location within Pennsylvania
- Location: Corner of University and S. High St., West Chester, Pennsylvania
- Coordinates: 39.953381°N 75.598210°W
- Area: 12.6 acres (5.1 ha)
- Built: 1927
- Architect: Walter Price
- Architectural style: Collegiate Gothic
- Part of: West Chester State College Quadrangle Historic District
- NRHP reference No.: 81000539
- Added to NRHP: October 08, 1981

Philips Memorial Hall is a building of West Chester University, in West Chester, Pennsylvania, United States, named after George Morris Philips (principal from 1881–1920), originally opened in 1927. It is a contributing building in the West Chester State College Quadrangle Historic District listed on the National Register of Historic Places in 1981. Designed by Walter F. Price, the exterior is fashioned from hammer-dressed Foxcroft Wissahickon schist, a local stone commonly used for buildings in the Collegiate Gothic style.

Thanks to the support of Emilie Kessel Asplundh '27 and others, preservation and renovations were completed in 1999. Special features include: the whispering archway; the distinctive gargoyles; coats of arms and figures of western civilization; the 2,000-volume Philips Autographed Library; the 1,200-seat Emilie K. Asplundh Concert Hall; and the Presidential office suite.

== Gallery ==
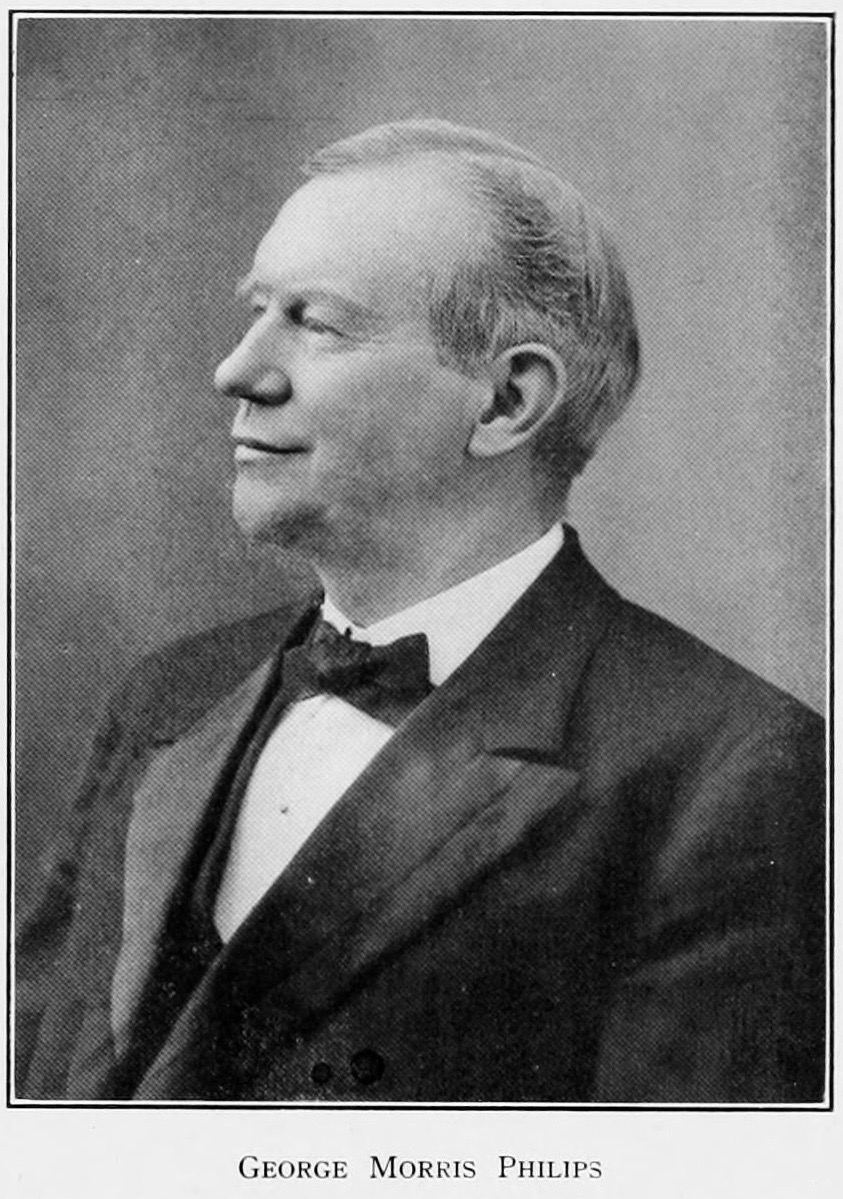
George Morris Philips

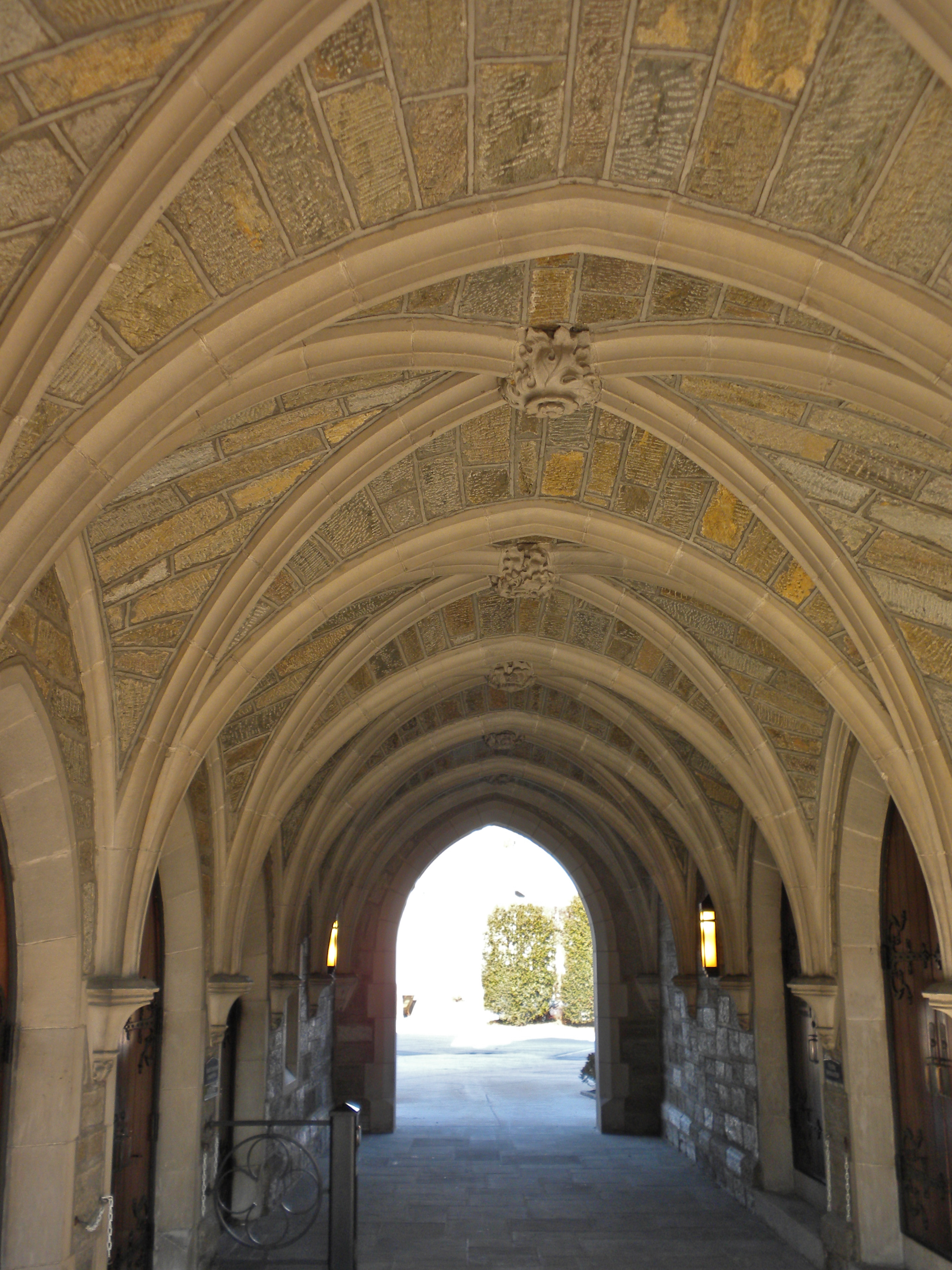
Whispering archway

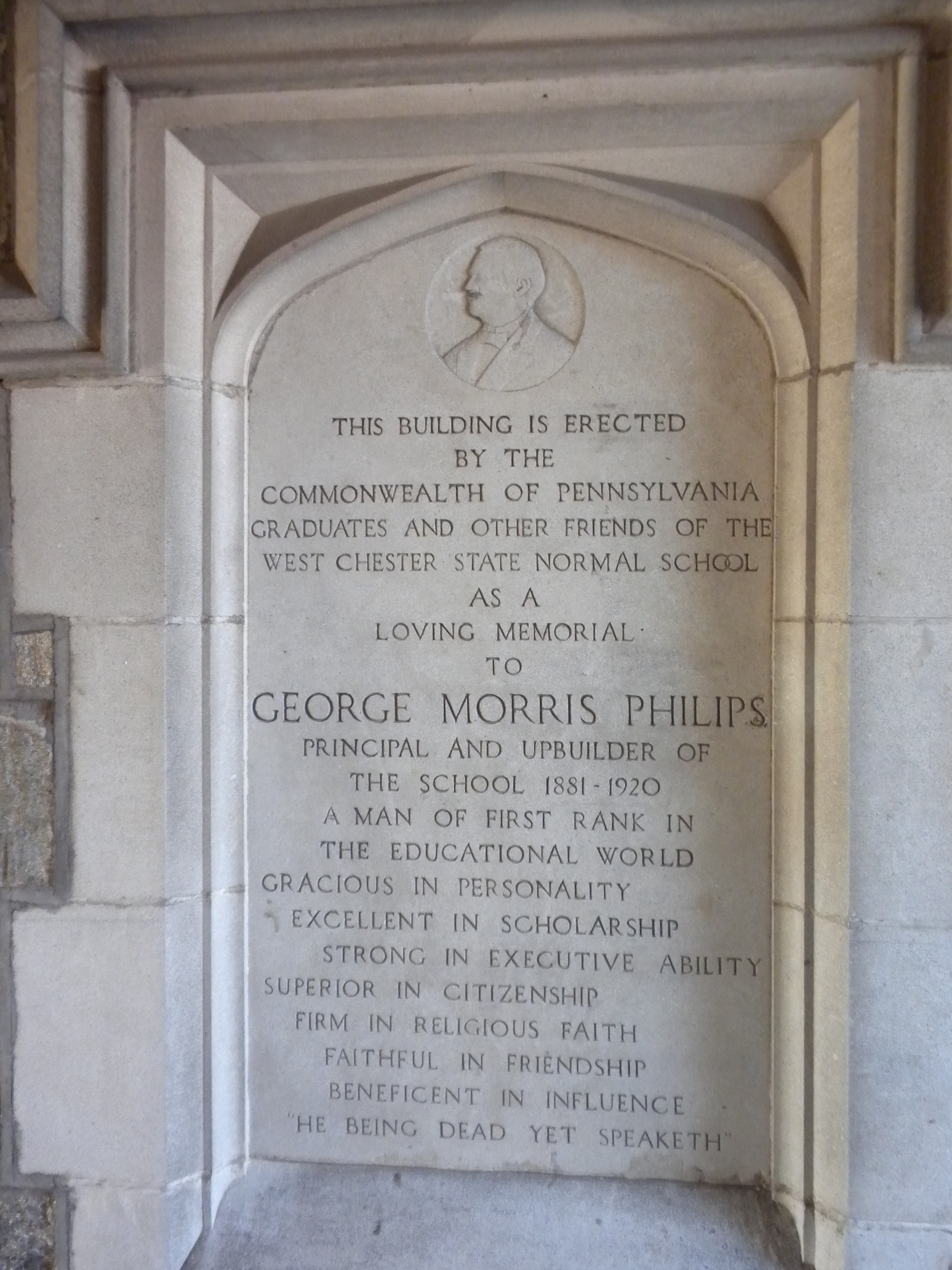
Dedication plaque

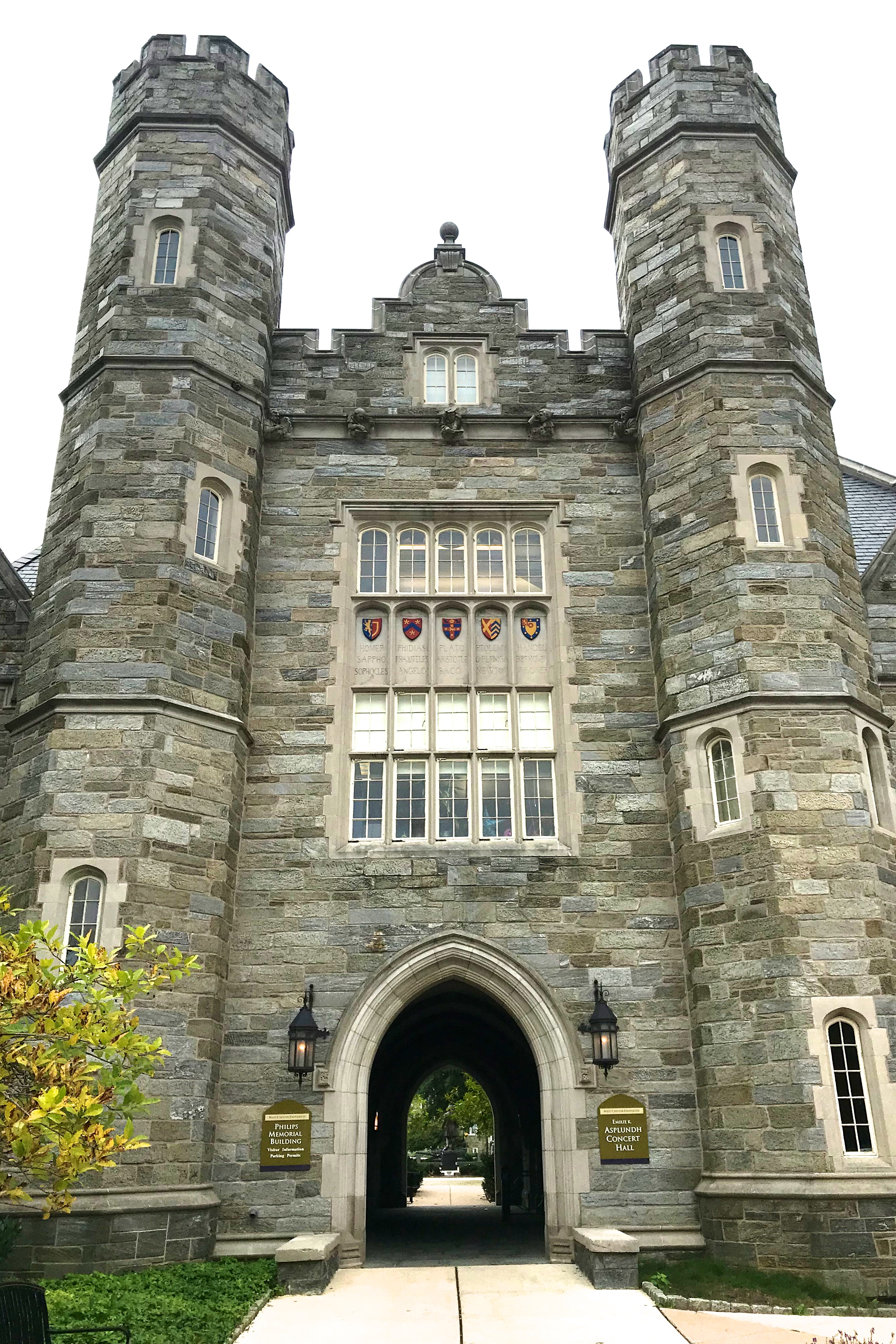
View from outside the quad, looking south

== See also ==
- William L. Price
