= Jackass Investing =

2011 book written by Michael Dever

Jackass Investing: Don't do it. Profit from it.
- Author: Michael Dever
- Language: English
- Subject: Investing
- Publisher: Ignite LLC
- Publication date: 2011
- Publication place: United States
- Pages: 284
- ISBN: 978-0-9835040-0-9
- OCLC: 760086114

Jackass Investing: Don't do it. Profit from it. is a book written by Michael Dever published by Ignite LLC in 2011.

The book has also been released under the title Exploiting the Myths: Profiting from Wall Street's misguided beliefs.

== Overview ==
"Jackass Investing" is an investment book that challenges conventional investment wisdom and "presents an entirely new system of thought." The book describes 20 common widely held beliefs about investing and explains why each is a myth and not a fact.

The book is based on the trading philosophy of author Michael Dever, which is based on broad strategy and market diversification. According to Dever, the definition of "Jackass Investing" is taking unnecessary risk.

The book was published in 2011, but Dever initially developed the idea for the book in 1999. He decided to write "Jackass Investing" to systematically refute major investment myths. He believes that most investment professionals preach similar "myths" that prohibit investors from creating truly diversified portfolios.

Dever introduces the concept of "return drivers" and explains how to use them to create trading strategies, which are the components necessary to create a truly diversified portfolio. A return driver is the core underlying reason that drives the price of a market.

== The Myths ==
The "myths" include the following:

- Myth #1: Stocks Provide an Intrinsic Return
- Myth #2: Buy and Hold Works Well for Long Term Investors
- Myth #3: You Can't Time the Market
- Myth #4: "Passive" Investing Beats "Active" Investing
- Myth #5: Stay Invested So You Don't Miss the Best Days
- Myth #6: Buy Low, Sell High
- Myth #7: It's Bad to Chase Performance
- Myth #8: Trading is Gambling - Investing is Safer
- Myth #9: Risk Can Be Measured Statistically
- Myth #10: Short Selling is Destabilizing and Risky
- Myth #11: Commodity Trading is Risky
- Myth #12: Futures Trading is Risky
- Myth #13: It's Best to Follow Expert Advice
- Myth #14: Government Regulations Protect Investors
- Myth #15: The Largest Investors Hold All the Cards
- Myth #16: Allocate a Small Amount to Foreign Stocks
- Myth #17: Lower Risk by Diversifying Across Asset Classes
- Myth #18: Diversification Failed in the '08 Financial Crisis
- Myth #19: Too Much Diversification Lowers Returns
- Myth #20: There is No Free Lunch
