= Jennifer O'Mara =

American politician (b. 1989)

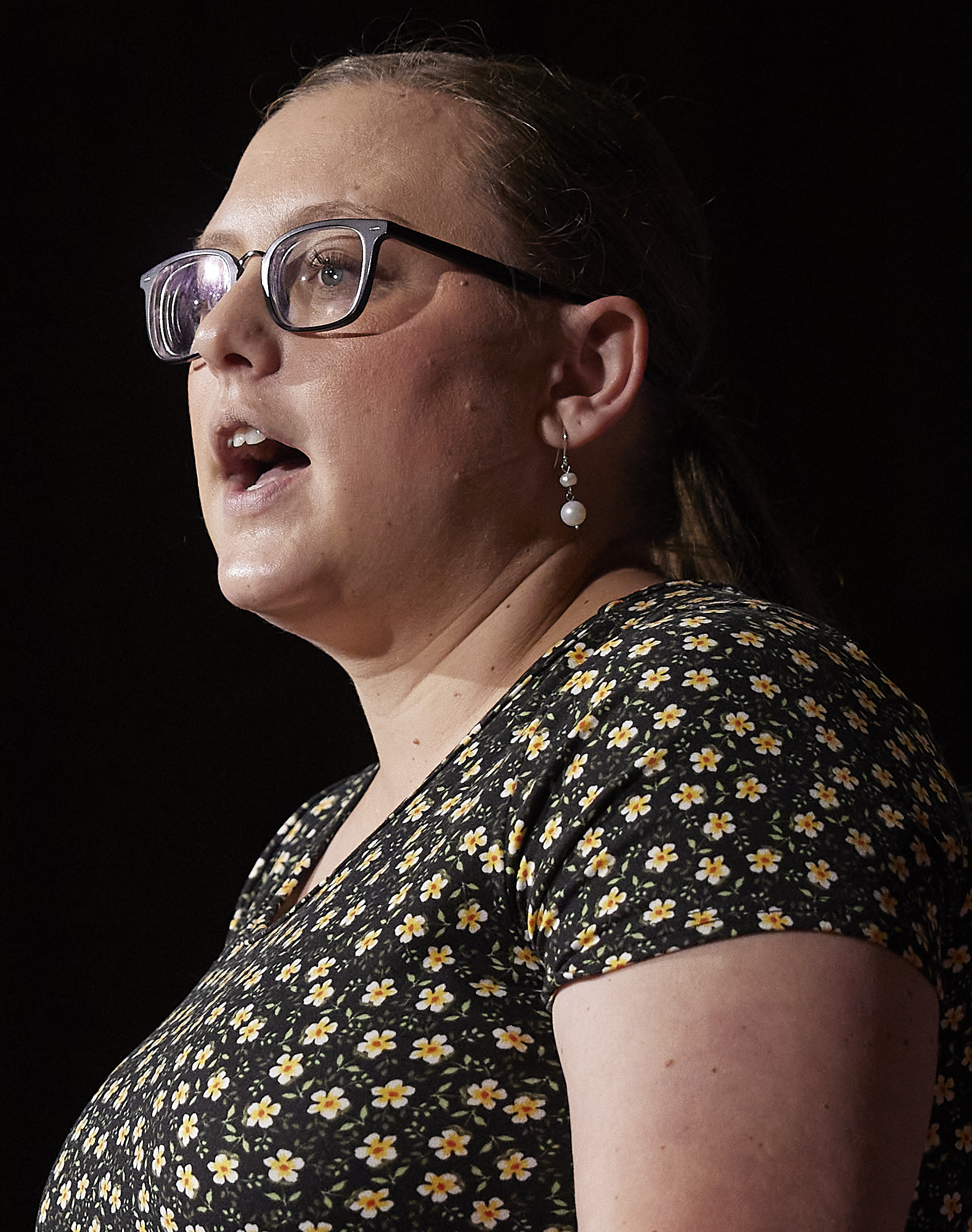

Member of the Pennsylvania House of Representatives from the 165th district
- Incumbent
- Assumed office January 1, 2019
- Preceded by: Alex Charlton

Personal details
- Born: November 12, 1989 (age 36) Philadelphia, Pennsylvania, U.S.
- Party: Democratic
- Spouse: Bradford Bitting (m. 2017)
- Children: 2
- Education: West Chester University (BA); University of Pennsylvania (MLA)
- Occupation: Educator; Nonprofit administrator
- Website: Official website Campaign website

Jennifer O'Mara (born November 12, 1989) is a Democratic member of the Pennsylvania House of Representatives, representing the 165th Legislative District. The district includes parts of Springfield Township, Marple Township, Radnor Township and the borough of Morton.

== Early life and education ==
The oldest of three children, O'Mara was born in Southwest Philadelphia. She moved to Delaware County with her mother and siblings after her father, a Philadelphia firefighter, died by gun suicide. O'Mara cites the importance of her father's pension and public program such as CHIP in supporting her family while she was a teenager. She graduated from Interboro High School in 2007 and became the first in her family to attend college.

She earned a Bachelor of Arts degree in history and a certificate in Secondary Education from West Chester University in 2011. In 2017, She received a Master's degree in liberal studies from the University of Pennsylvania, her master's thesis was centered around creative methods for childhood grief.

== Pennsylvania House of Representatives ==
=== Elections ===
==== 2018 ====
On November 19, 2017, O'Mara launched her campaign for the 165th District. The district had never elected a Democratic representative before, and had previously been represented by one-term Republican Alex Charlton.

O'Mara was unopposed in the Democratic primary, while Charlton defeated primary challenger Regina Scheerer with 65.7% of the Republican vote. O'Mara upset Charlton in the 2018 general election, becoming the first Democrat and first woman to represent the district.

==== 2020 ====
O'Mara ran for re-election in 2020. She was unopposed in the Democratic primary and faced Republican Robert Smythe Jr. in the general election. O'Mara retained her seat by defeating Smythe with 51.5% of the vote.

=== Results ===
Pennsylvania House of Representatives, District 165, 2018
Party	Candidate	Votes	%
Democratic	Jennifer O'Mara	16,627	50.8%
Republican	Alex Charlton (incumbent)	16,096	49.2%
Total votes		32,723	100%
Democratic gain from Republican			

Pennsylvania House of Representatives, District 165, 2020
Party	Candidate	Votes	%
Democratic	Jennifer O'Mara (incumbent)	21,529	51.5%
Republican	Robert Smythe Jr	20,222	48.4%
Write-in		43	0.1%
Total votes		41,794	100%
Democratic hold			

Pennsylvania House of Representatives, District 165, 2022
Party	Candidate	Votes	%
Democratic	Jennifer O'Mara (incumbent)	20,936	60.9%
Republican	Nichole Missino	13,027	37.9%
Independent	William Foster	402	1.2%
Total votes		34,365	100%
Democratic hold			

=== Tenure ===
O'Mara was sworn in on January 1, 2019, and was elected first vice-chair for the Democratic Caucus's Southeast delegation.

==== Committee assignments ====
- Veterans Affairs & Emergency Preparedness
- Transportation
- Aging and Older Adult Services

Pennsylvania House of Representatives
Preceded by Alex Charlton	Member of the Pennsylvania House of Representatives from the 165th district 2019–present	Incumbent
