= West Chester State College Quadrangle Historic District =

Historic district in Pennsylvania, United States

- U.S. National Register of Historic Places
- U.S. Historic district
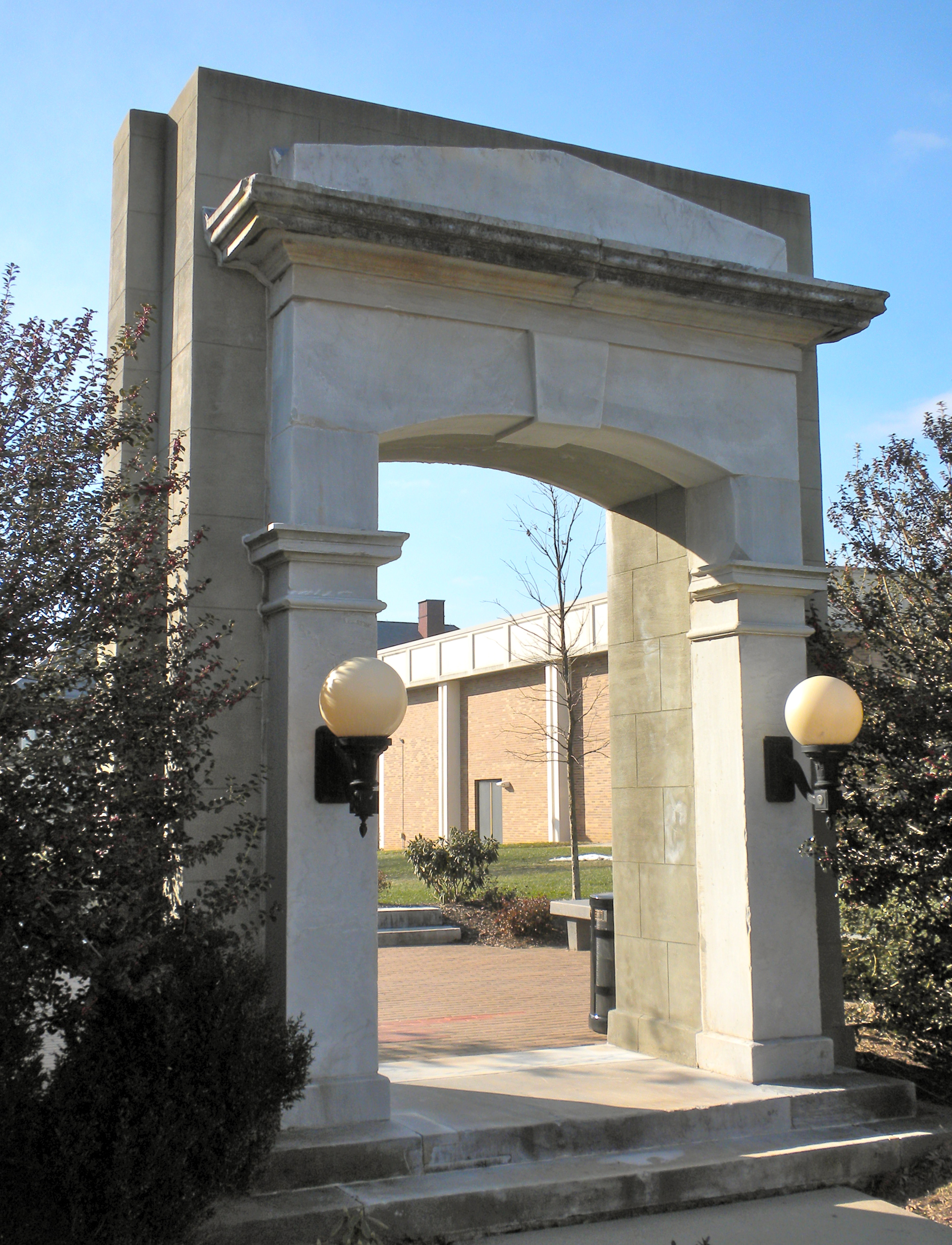
- Old Main Entry, West Chester State College Quadrangle Historic District, January 2010

- Location within Pennsylvania Location within the United States
- Location: Bounded by S. High and S. Church Sts., College and Rosedale Aves., West Chester, Pennsylvania
- Coordinates: 39°57′08″N 75°35′55″W
- Area: 12.6 acres (5.1 ha)
- Built: 1891-1940
- Architect: Multiple
- Architectural style: Colonial Revival, Classical Revival, Other, Collegiate Gothic
- NRHP reference No.: 81000539
- Added to NRHP: October 8, 1981

- Old Main, West Chester State College
- Formerly listed on the U.S. National Register of Historic Places
- Location: High St. and Rosedale Ave., West Chester, Pennsylvania
- Built: 1870
- Architects: Yarnall & Cooper
- Architectural style: College architecture
- NRHP reference No.: 74002333

Significant dates
- Added to NRHP: May 2, 1971
- Removed from NRHP: January 1, 1974

West Chester State College Quadrangle Historic District, also known as the Quadrangle Historic District, is a group of historic academic buildings and national historic district located on the campus of West Chester University in West Chester, Chester County, Pennsylvania. It consists of five contributing buildings built between 1891 and 1940. They are Recitation Hall (1891-1893), the former Model School (1899, Ruby Jones Hall), the Old Library (1902-1904), Philips Memorial Building (1925-1927), and Anderson Hall (1937-1940). Except for Philips and Anderson, these buildings are all constructed of native Chester County serpentine stone.

It was listed on the National Register of Historic Places on October 8, 1981 for its significance in architecture and education. The Old Main, West Chester State College is formerly listed on the National Register of Historic Places, after being demolished in 1973.

== Gallery ==
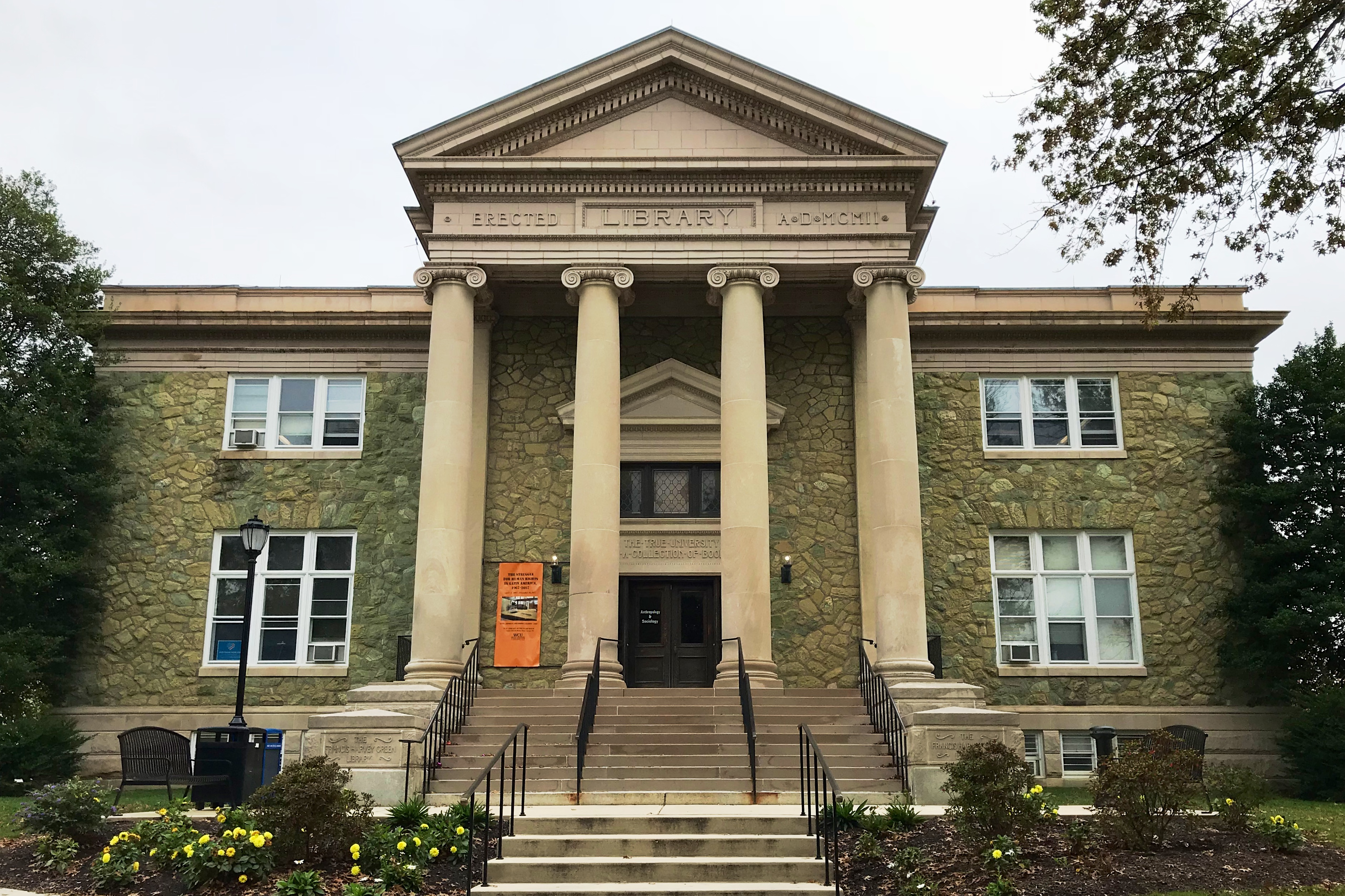
Old Library

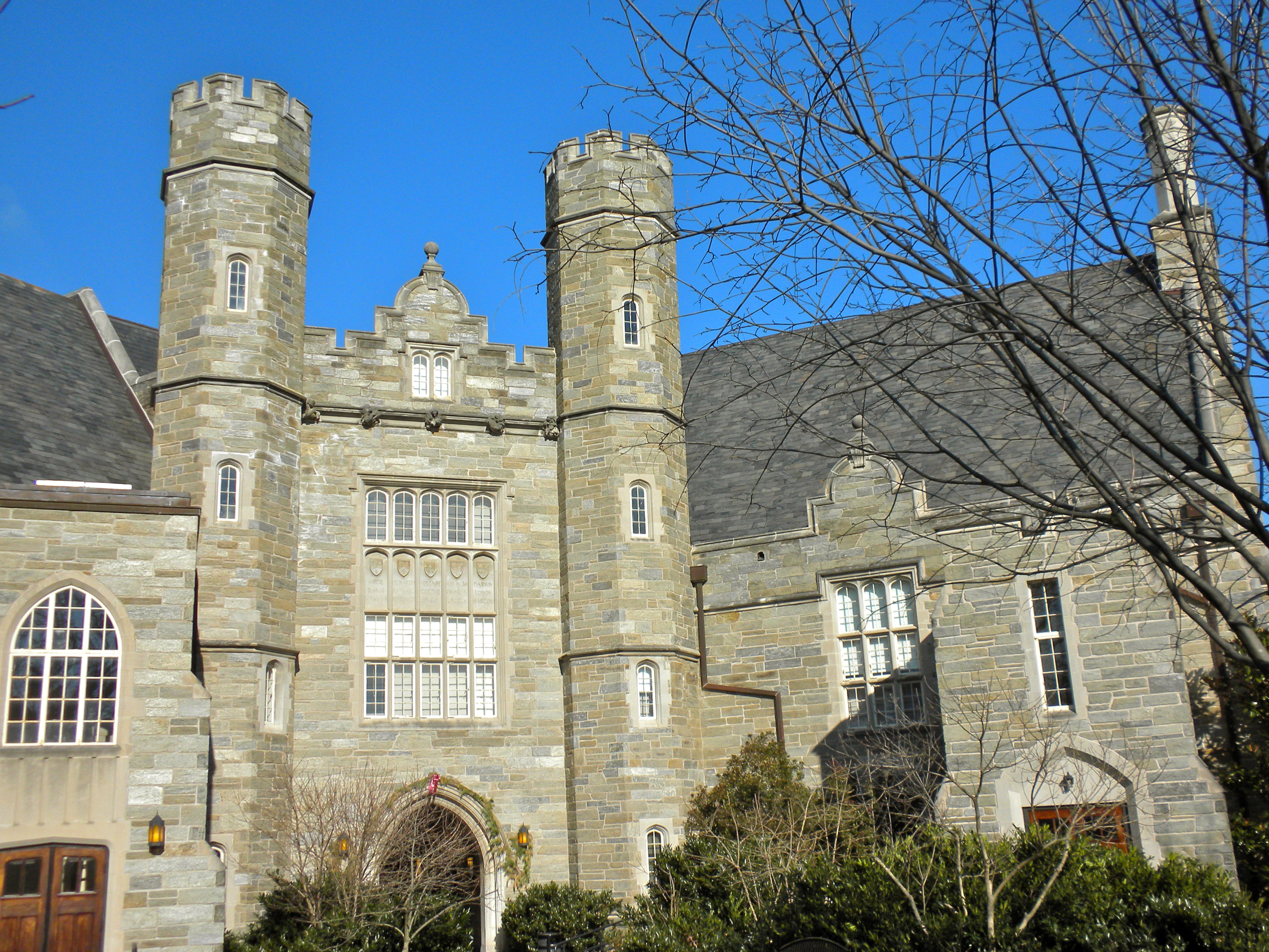
Philips Memorial Building

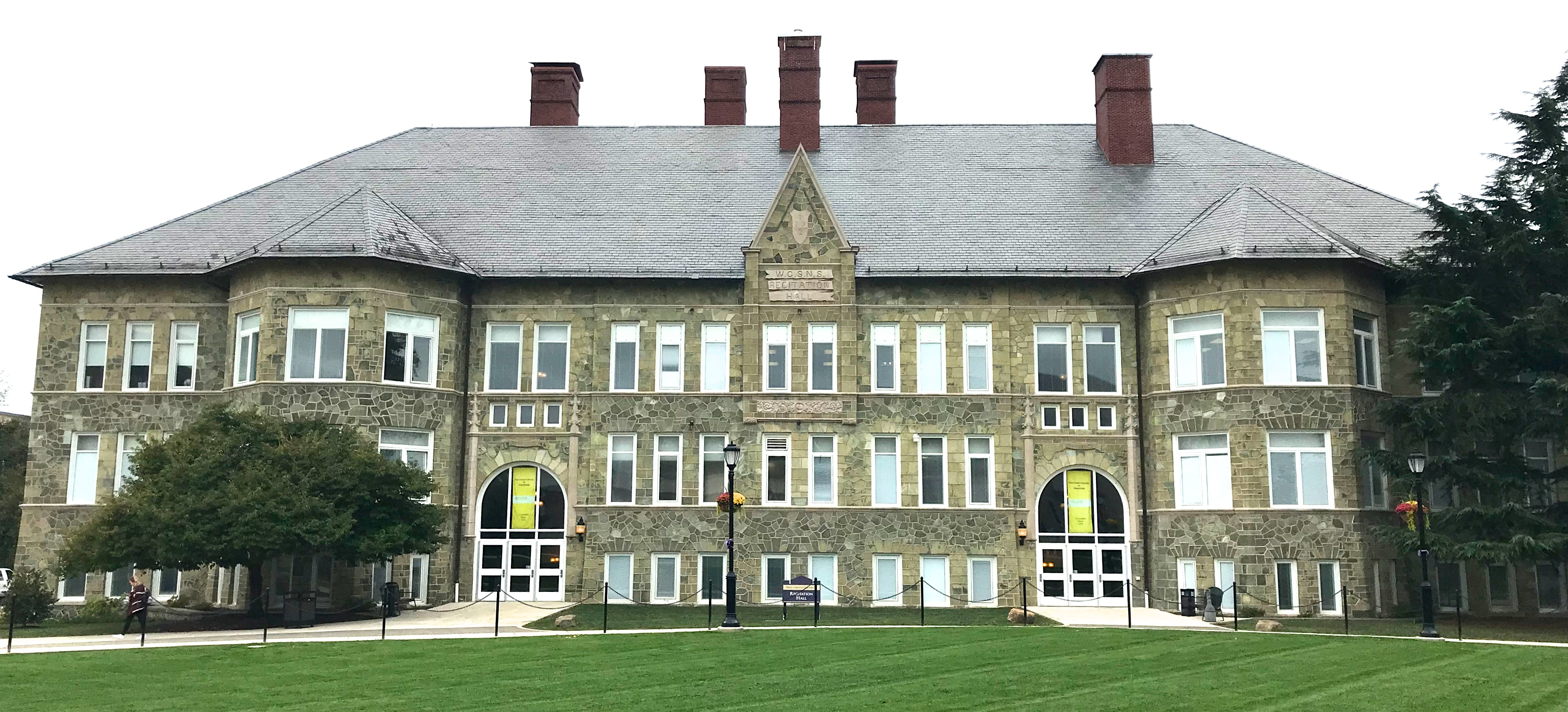
Recitation Hall

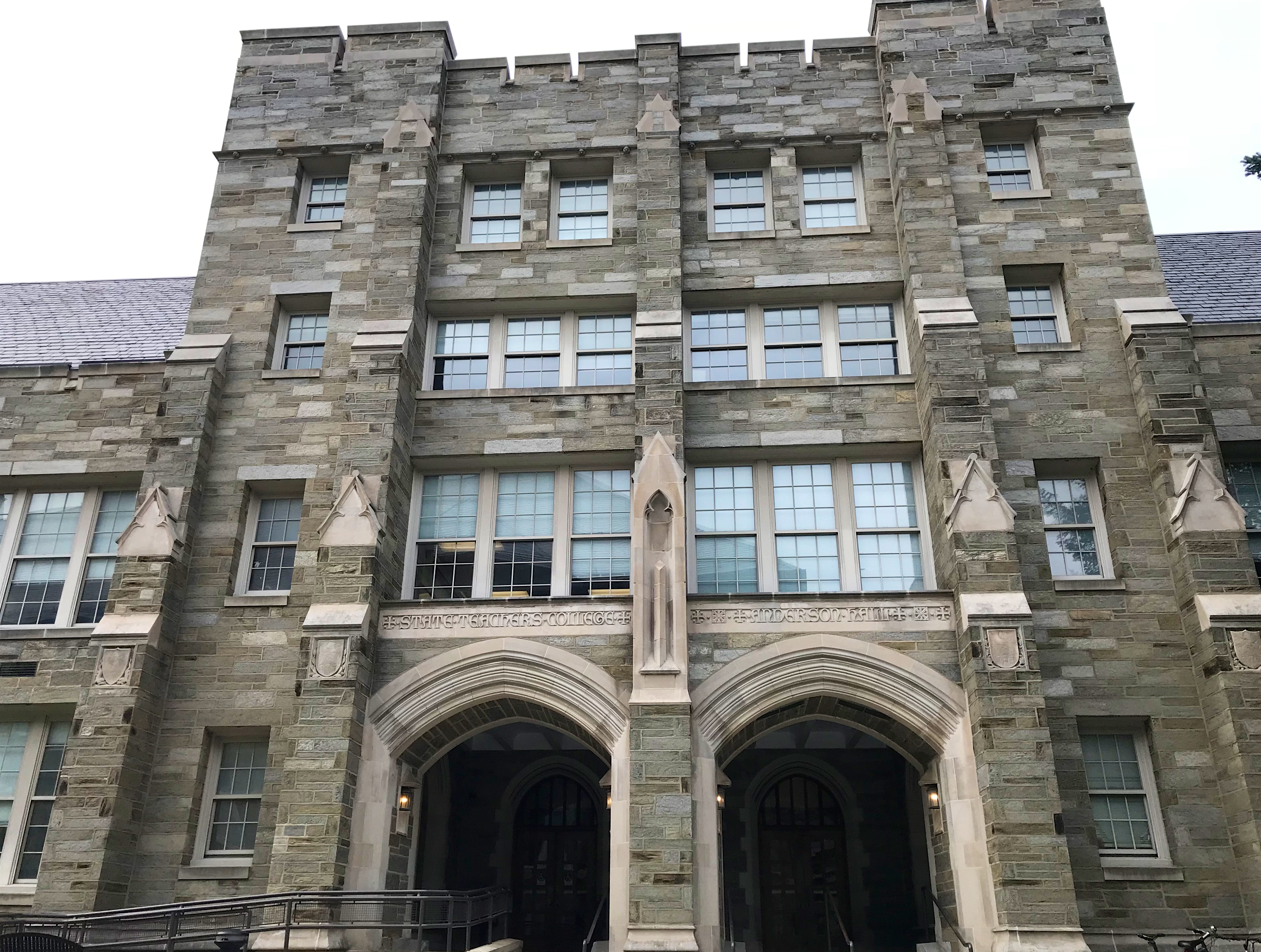
Anderson Hall
