= Pennsylvania House of Representatives, District 165 =

American legislative district

Pennsylvania's 165th State House of Representatives district
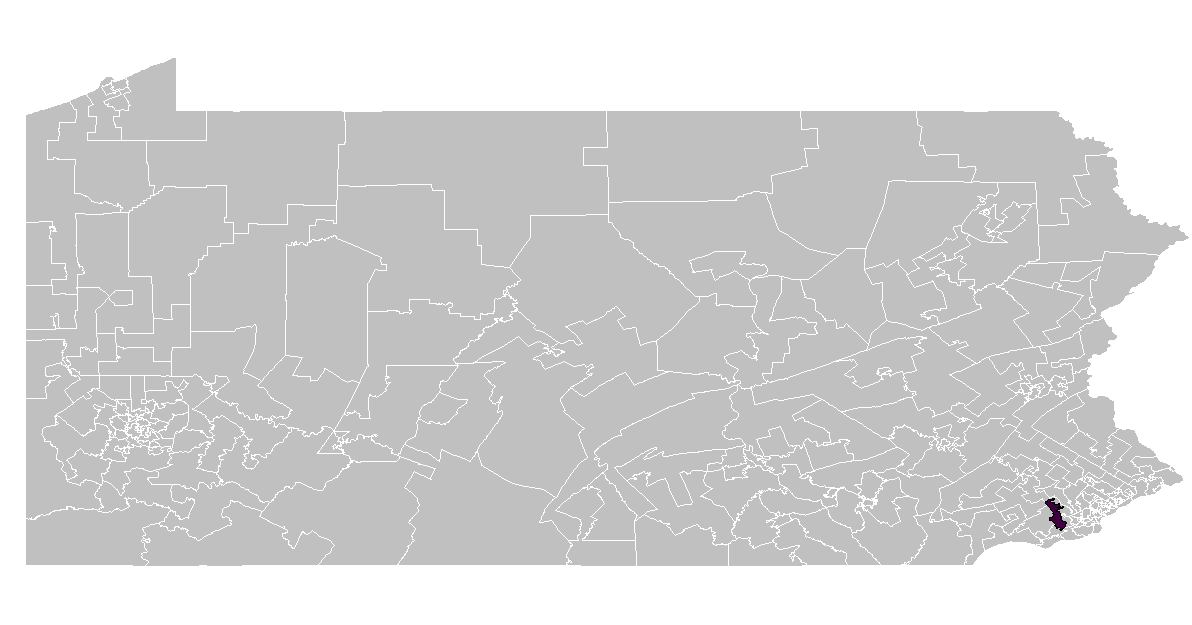
Representative
Jennifer O'Mara; D–Springfield Township, Delaware County
- Population (2021): 62,800

Pennsylvania House of Representatives District 165 includes part of Delaware County. It is currently represented by Democrat Jennifer O'Mara.

== District profile ==
The district includes the following areas:

Delaware County:

- Marple Township (PART)
  - Ward 04 [PART, Division 02]
  - Ward 05
  - Ward 06
  - Ward 07
- Media
- Morton
- Springfield Township
- Swarthmore
- Upper Providence Township

== Representatives ==
Representative	Party	Years	District home	Note
Before 1969, seats were apportioned by county.
Donald M. McCurdy	Republican	1969–1974		
Thomas J. Stapleton, Jr.	Democrat	1975–1978		
Mary Ann Arty	Republican	1981–1988		
Bill Adolph	Republican	1989–2016	Springfield Township	
Alex Charlton	Republican	2017–2018	Springfield Township	
Jennifer O'Mara	Democrat	2019–present	Springfield Township	Incumbent

== Recent election results ==
2022 election
Party	Candidate	Votes	%
Democratic	Jennifer O'Mara (incumbent)	20,936	60.9
Republican	Nichole Missino	13,027	37.9
Independent	William Foster	402	1.2
Total votes		34,365	100.0
Democratic hold			

2020 election
Party	Candidate	Votes	%
Democratic	Jennifer O'Mara (incumbent)	21,529	51.6
Republican	Robert Smythe	20,222	48.4
Total votes		41,751	100.0
Democratic hold			

2018 election
Party	Candidate	Votes	%
Democratic	Jennifer O'Mara	16,627	50.8
Republican	Alex Charlton (incumbent)	16,096	49.2
Total votes		32,723	100.0
Democratic gain from Republican			

2016 election
Party	Candidate	Votes	%
Republican	Alex Charlton	20,615	56.0
Democratic	Elaine Paul Schaefer	16,193	44.0
Total votes		36,808	100.0
Republican hold			

2014 election
Party	Candidate	Votes	%
Republican	Bill Adolph (incumbent)	15,765	64.7
Democratic	Charles Hadley	8,615	35.3
Total votes		24,380	100.0
Republican hold			

2012 election
Party	Candidate	Votes	%
Republican	Bill Adolph (incumbent)	19,678	63.2
Democratic	Jeremy Fearn	11,443	35.3
Total votes		33,615	100.0
Republican hold			

2010 election
Party	Candidate	Votes	%
Republican	Bill Adolph (incumbent)	17,202	100.0
Total votes		17,202	100.0
Republican hold			
