= Alex Charlton =

American politician

Alexander Charlton

Member of the Pennsylvania House of Representatives from the 165th district
- In office January 3, 2017 – November 30, 2018
- Preceded by: Bill Adolph
- Succeeded by: Jennifer O'Mara

Personal details
- Born: February 24, 1980 (age 46) Bryn Mawr, Pennsylvania
- Party: Republican

Alexander Charlton (born February 24, 1980) is an American politician and former Republican member of the Pennsylvania House of Representatives from the 165th district, serving from 2017 through 2018.

== Career ==
Charlton served as the president of the Delaware County Chamber of Commerce. He was elected to the Pennsylvania House of Representatives for the 165th district in 2017.

He lost reelection in 2018 to Democratic challenger Jennifer O'Mara.
