= Bill Adolph =

American accountant and politician (born 1949)

William Adolph

Member of the Pennsylvania House of Representatives from the 165th district
- In office 1988–2016
- Preceded by: Mary Ann Arty
- Succeeded by: Alex Charlton

Personal details
- Born: October 23, 1949 (age 76) Philadelphia, Pennsylvania, U.S.
- Party: Republican
- Education: Christian Brothers University
- Occupation: Accountant
- Website: williamadolph.com

William Adolph, Jr. (born October 23, 1949) is an American accountant and politician. He is a former Republican member of the Pennsylvania House of Representatives, representing the 165th Legislative District from 1988 to 2016. He was chairman of the House Appropriations Committee.

== Early life and education ==
Adolph was born in Philadelphia, Pennsylvania and graduated from Cardinal O'Hara High School in Springfield, Pennsylvania in 1967 and Christian Brothers College in 1971.

== Career ==
Adolph is a public accountant who has operated his own firm since 1971. In 1982, he was elected to the Springfield Board of Commissioners as a Republican. During his tenure, he also served as president of the Board of Commissioners.

Adolph served as the Majority Chairman of the House Appropriations Committee. He was first elected by his colleagues to serve in this role in January 2010. and was reelected to a second term as Majority Chairman.

Prior to joining House leadership, Rep. Adolph served as chairman of the House Professional Licensure Committee and a member of the House Consumer Affairs Committee. He previously chaired the House Environmental Resources and Energy Committee.

In addition to his leadership roles in the legislature, Rep. Adolph has also served as chairman of the board of the Pennsylvania Higher Education Assistance Agency (PHEAA). In his service as PHEAA chairman, he has worked tirelessly to fulfill PHEAA's mission of developing innovative ways to ease the financial burden of higher education for students, families, schools, and taxpayers. During Rep. Adolph's tenure as chairman, PHEAA has distributed approximately $4.8 billion in state grants for higher education to over 2 million Pennsylvania students.

His legislative agenda focused on the environment, education, economic development and job creation issues. He has played a key role in improving the state's business climate by cutting taxes and increasing competitiveness through regulatory reforms, such as revisions to the workers' compensation law. In 1998, he was the prime sponsor of a law eliminating the personal income tax on the profit from the sale of a home. In 2002, his legislation assisting no-impact home-based businesses was signed into law, allowing businesses that operate in the home to do so without excessive interference with local ordinances, yet still preserving the look and feel of the neighborhoods in which they operate.

Adolph also was the prime sponsor of a telecommunications law, which addresses regulations for broadband availability for businesses and schools, as well as makes telephone service available to Pennsylvania's lower income families at reduced rates. In addition, he authored the Guaranteed Energy Savings Act, which provides Pennsylvania's school districts and local governments with energy conservation and energy savings through cost-containment contracts with third-party vendors.

He was a leading advocate in medical malpractice liability reform, sponsoring a 1996 law and co-sponsoring the bill that culminated in the enactment of legislation that reformed the Medical CAT Fund, addressed patient safety concerns and made significant strides in lawsuit reform. He continued to push for further changes which culminated in the enactment of joint and several liability reforms and most recently supported the adoption of the Fair Share Act in 2011 which implemented reforms necessary to restore fairness and personal responsibility to our legal system.

Adolph was the prime sponsor of a law, which expanded the property tax/rent rebate program to include more senior citizens and permanently disabled persons by exempting half of all Social Security and railroad pension income from the definition of income. He advocated reform to unemployment compensation laws as prime sponsor of legislation to end the unfair penalties that prevent senior citizens who are collecting Social Security and other pension income from receiving full unemployment benefits.

Another highlight of Rep. Adolph's legislative career came in 1996 when his Taxpayers' Bill of Rights (Act 195 of 1996) legislation was signed into law. The law protects taxpayers and improves service by establishing uniform rules and regulations for the state Department of Revenue to follow, which ensure fair and equitable administration of state tax laws.

In 2016, Rep. Adolph announced he would not be running for re-election and retire at the end of 2016.

== Awards ==
Representative Adolph's legislative work has been recognized as he has received several noteworthy awards for his work on legislative priorities of environmental conservation, education, economic development and job creation issues.

In recognition of his efforts to preserve crucial funding for the Keystone Recreation, Park and Conservation Fund in 2012, Rep. Adolph was presented with the 2012 Conservation Leadership Award from the Pennsylvania Lands Trust Association, the 2012 Pennsylvania Recreation, and Parks Society Governmental Award.

Representative Adolph was also acknowledged for his unwavering commitment to higher education in Pennsylvania by The Association of Independent Colleges and Universities of Pennsylvania. In 2012 the association awarded Representative Adolph the Benjamin Franklin Medal for Distinguished Achievement on behalf of Higher Education.

For his support of economic development and job creation, he is an eight-time recipient of both the Legislator of the Year award and the Spirit of Free Enterprise award, presented by the Delaware County Chamber of Commerce. In 2012 Representative Adolph was also recognized for his support of local businesses and awarded the Legislator of the Year Award by the Delaware County Pharmacists' Association.

== Personal ==
Adolph is a former Springfield Athletic Association board member. He was a youth football coach for the Springfield Youth Club and head coach of St. Francis of Assisi CYO.

He is a graduate of Cardinal O'Hara High School and also a member of the school's Hall of Fame. Adolph attended Christian Brothers University. Adolph resides in Springfield with his wife, Debbie. Together they have raised three sons, Bill, Sam and Ryne. They also have six grandchildren.
