= Donald McCurdy =

American politician (1930–2022)

Donald M. McCurdy

Member of the Pennsylvania House of Representatives from the 165th district
- In office 1967–1974
- Preceded by: District created
- Succeeded by: Thomas J. Stapleton, Jr.

Personal details
- Born: June 7, 1930 Philadelphia, Pennsylvania
- Died: June 19, 2022 (aged 92) Pennsylvania
- Party: Republican

Donald Mervyn McCurdy (June 7, 1930 – June 19, 2022) was an American politician from Pennsylvania who served as a Republican member of the Pennsylvania House of Representatives for the 165th district from 1967 to 1974.

== Early life and education ==
McCurdy was born in Philadelphia, Pennsylvania, and graduated from Upper Darby High School. He received an A.B. degree from Dickinson College in 1952 and his LL.B. from Dickinson Law School in 1955.

He served as a helicopter pilot in the United States Navy from 1955 to 1959.

== Career ==
McCurdy was a lawyer and worked as a member of the 11th Ward of the Upper Darby junior Committee from 1960 to 1962. He worked as Special Assistant Deputy District Attorney for the Pennsylvania Office of the Attorney General from 1963 to 1966. He was the chair of the Delaware County Citizens for Nixon-Agnew in 1967.

He was elected to the Pennsylvania House of Representatives for the 165th district in 1966 and served three more consecutive terms until 1974. He was an unsuccessful candidate for reelection in 1975 and lost to Thomas J. Stapleton.

He was subsequently appointed to the Pennsylvania State Ethics Commission, serving from 2001 to 2006.

== Death ==
McCurdy died in Pennsylvania on June 19, 2022, at the age of ninety-two.
