= Old Library, West Chester =

- Old Library
- U.S. National Register of Historic Places
- U.S. Historic district – Contributing property
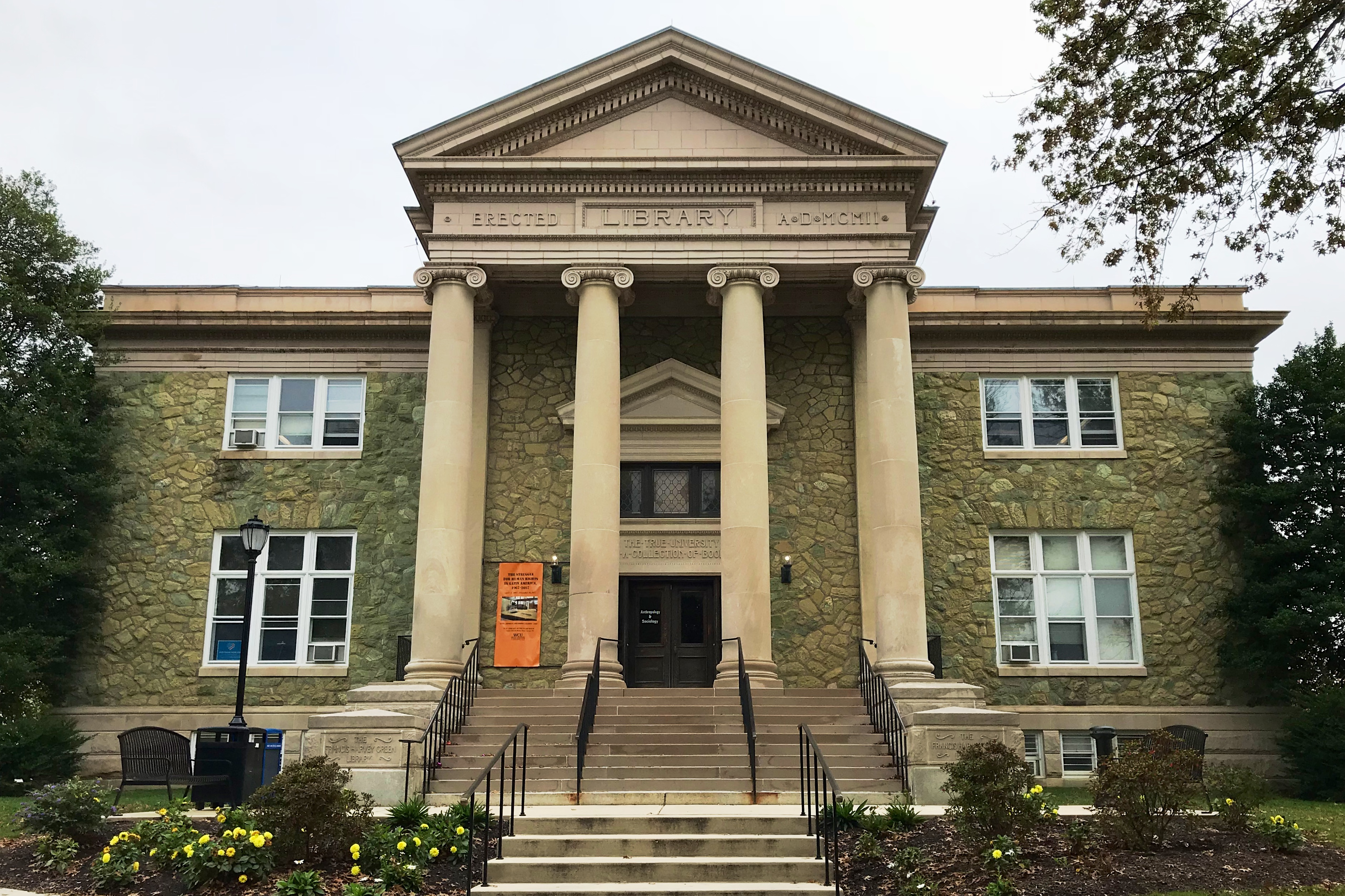

- Location within Pennsylvania
- Location: Corner of South Church Street and West Rosedale Avenue, West Chester, Pennsylvania
- Coordinates: 39.951407°N 75.598219°W
- Area: 12.6 acres (5.1 ha)
- Built: 1902-1904
- Architectural style: Classical Revival
- Part of: West Chester State College Quadrangle Historic District
- NRHP reference No.: 81000539
- Added to NRHP: October 08, 1981

The Old Library at West Chester University in West Chester, Pennsylvania, USA, is situated on the prominent corner of South Church Street and West Rosedale Avenue, marking the southwest corner of the Quad.

== History and architectural features ==
Following the old tradition of the Quad, this 1902 building was made from serpentine rubble stone with a slate roof. The Department of Anthropology and Sociology, as well as the West Chester University Museum of Anthropology and Archaeology, are housed in this facility.

It is a contributing building to the West Chester State College Quadrangle Historic District, which was listed on the National Register of Historic Places in 1981.
