= West Chester University =

Public university in West Chester, Pennsylvania, US

West Chester University of Pennsylvania
- Former names: West Chester Normal School (1871–1927); West Chester State Teachers College (1927–1960); West Chester State College (1960–1983)
- Type: Public research university
- Established: September 25, 1871; 155 years ago
- Parent institution: PASSHE
- Academic affiliations: Space-grant; Keystone Library Network
- Endowment: $40 million (2025)
- President: R. Lorraine Bernotsky
- Provost: Jeffery L. Osgood, Jr.
- Academic staff: 695 full-time; 298 part-time
- Students: 17,275 (fall 2022)
- Undergraduates: 14,392 (fall 2022)
- Postgraduates: 2,883 (fall 2022)
- Location: West Chester, Pennsylvania, United States (Note: The north campus is partially in West Chester and West Goshen Township, while the south campus is partially in East Bradford Township and West Goshen Township. The university has a West Chester mailing address.); 39.9522°N 75.6001°W
- Campus: 388 acres (1.57 km^{2}); College town
- Colors: Purple and Gold
- Nickname: Golden Rams
- Sporting affiliations: NCAA Division II – PSAC; ECAC
- Mascot: Rammy
- Website: www.wcupa.edu
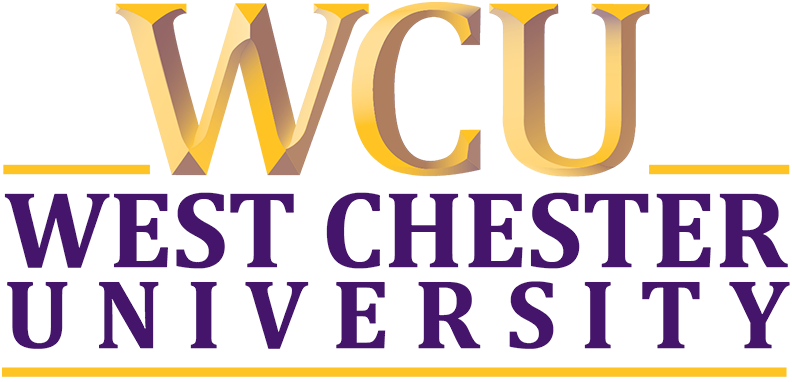

U.S. National Register of Historic Places

U.S. Historic district
- Official name: West Chester State College Quadrangle Historic District
- Type: NRHP Historic district
- Criteria: Architecture
- Designated: October 8, 1981
- Reference no.: 81000539

U.S. National Historic Landmark

Pennsylvania Historical Marker
- Official name: Frederick Douglass (1818–1895)
- Type: Roadside
- Criteria: Location of Frederick Douglass' final public lecture
- Designated: February 1, 2006

West Chester University of Pennsylvania (WCUPA), commonly known as West Chester University (WCU), is a public research university in West Chester, Pennsylvania, United States. The university is accredited by the Middle States Commission on Higher Education and classified among "R2: Doctoral Universities – High research activity". With 17,275 undergraduate and graduate students as of 2022, WCU is the largest of the 10 state-owned universities belonging to the Pennsylvania State System of Higher Education (PASSHE) and the sixth largest university in Pennsylvania. It also maintains a Center City Philadelphia satellite campus on Market Street.

== History ==
The university traces its roots to the West Chester Academy, a private, state-aided school that existed from 1812 to 1869. As the state began to take increasing responsibility for public education, the academy was transformed into West Chester Normal School or West Chester State Normal School, still privately owned and state certified. The normal school admitted its first class, consisting of 160 students, on September 25, 1871. In 1913, West Chester became the first of the normal schools to be owned outright by the Commonwealth of Pennsylvania.

West Chester became West Chester State Teachers College in 1927 when Pennsylvania initiated a four-year program of teacher education. In 1960, as the Commonwealth paved the way for liberal arts programs in its college system, West Chester was renamed West Chester State College, and two years later introduced the liberal arts program that turned the one-time academy into a comprehensive college.

The campus quad located on North Campus appears on the National Register of Historic Places, and is called the West Chester State College Quadrangle Historic District, featuring WCU's historic buildings. The buildings, with the exception of Anderson Hall and Philips Memorial Building (named after long-time principal George Morris Philips), were each built with local Chester County serpentine stone. They include Ruby Jones Hall, Recitation Hall and the Old Library.

With the passage of the State System of Higher Education bill, West Chester became one of the 14 universities in the Pennsylvania State System of Higher Education on July 1, 1983. Along with its new name—West Chester University of Pennsylvania—the institution acquired a new system of governance and the opportunity to expand its degree programs.

West Chester is recognized for its formal poetry program. Its annual conference on form and narrative in poetry began in 1995 and is devoted to New Formalism. It has established a poetry center that sponsors readings and an annual book competition oriented toward formal poetry. Its Iris N. Spencer Poetry Awards recognize undergraduate achievement in formal poetry.

Nineteen days before his death, Frederick Douglass gave his last public lecture, on February 1, 1895, at West Chester University. The university's Frederick Douglass Institute is named in his honor, and a statue of Douglass appears on its campus. It has been named a national historic landmark by the U.S. National Park Service. The Underground Railroad Network to Freedom recognized the Frederick Douglass Institute for its work in understanding the history of the underground railroad.

== Campus ==
The university's north campus is partially in West Chester borough and partially in West Goshen Township. The south campus is partially in West Goshen Township and partially in East Bradford Township. Both campuses are located in a suburban area approximately 20 miles (32 km) from Philadelphia. West Chester's downtown center is less than 0.5 miles (0.80 km) away from the main campus. The university also operates an urban satellite campus in Center City, Philadelphia.

On campus, there is the Recreation Center, the Business and Public Management Center, The Dr. Sandra F. Prichard-Mather Planetarium, The Hollinger Field House, many buildings (built in the 1800s and early 1900s) in the West Chester State College Quadrangle Historic District registered into the National Register of Historic Places, and the Sciences & Engineering Center that has been recently completed, just to name a few buildings. There are also many outdoor activity areas such as: basketball courts, tennis courts, volleyball courts, and the nearly 100-acre (40 ha) Robert B. Gordon Natural Area for Environmental Studies.

West Chester University has the second-largest university geothermal system in the United States. The system drastically reduces carbon emissions on the campus.

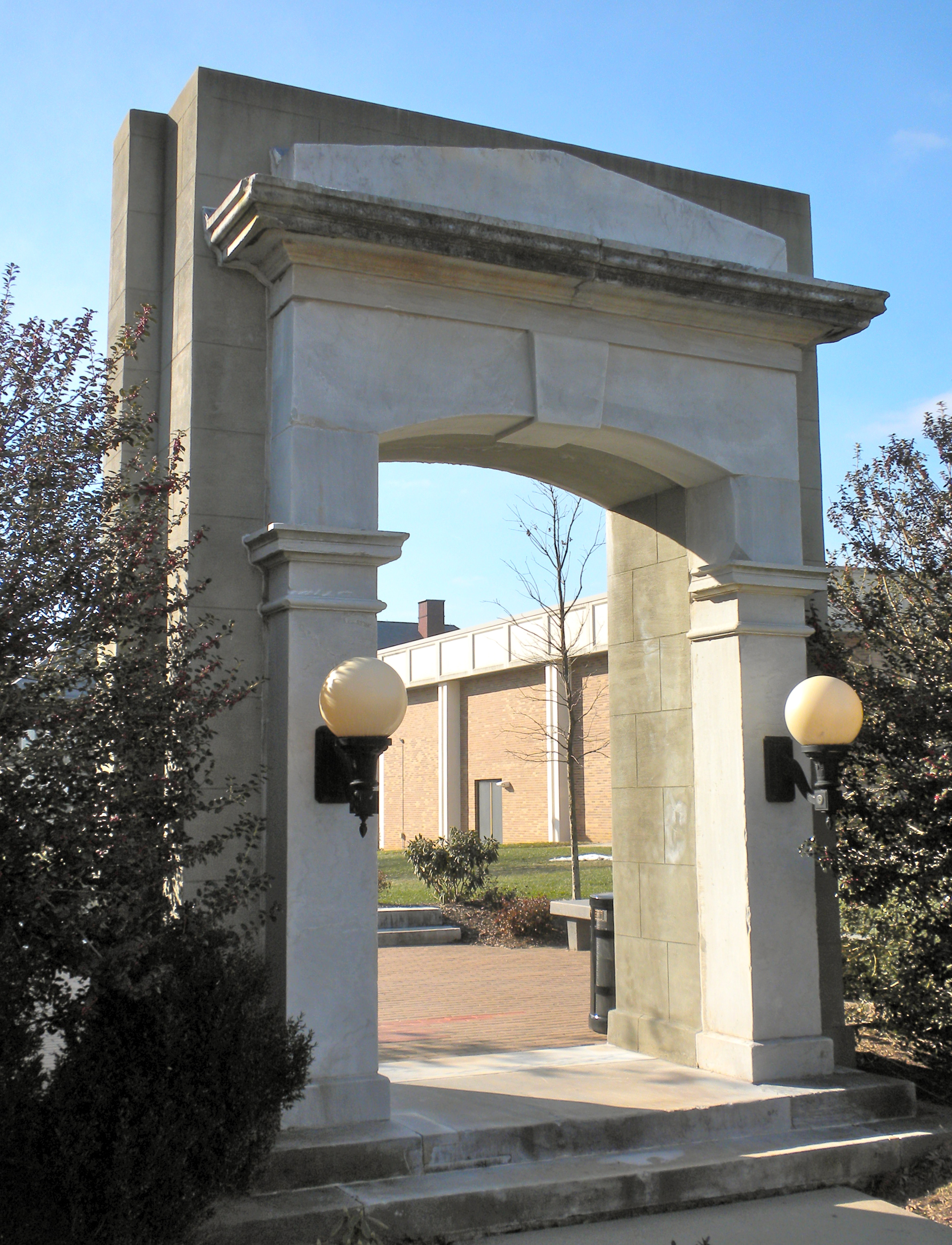
Entry to Old Main Building, reconstructed on High Street opening onto the Quadrangle

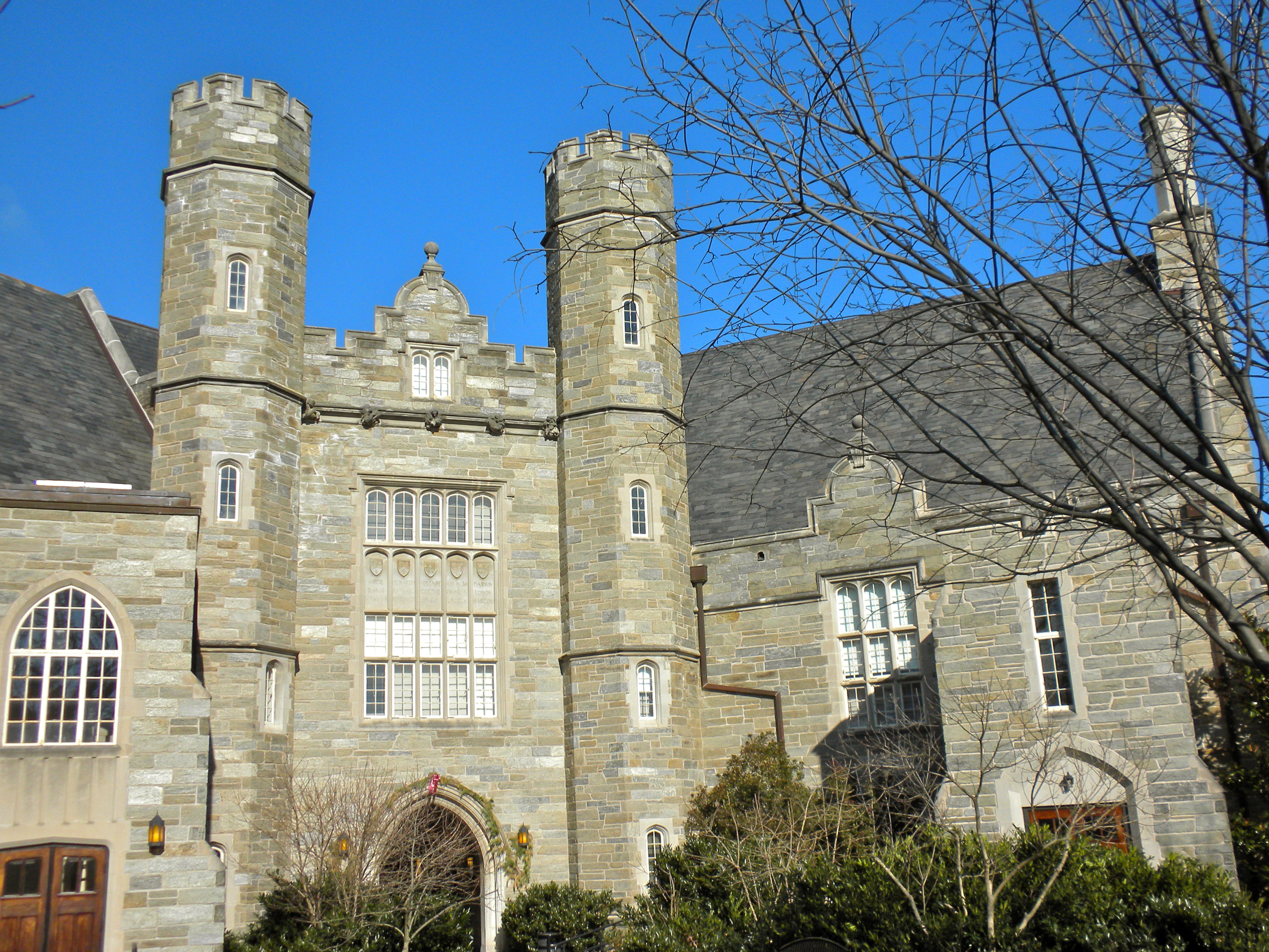
Philips Memorial Building

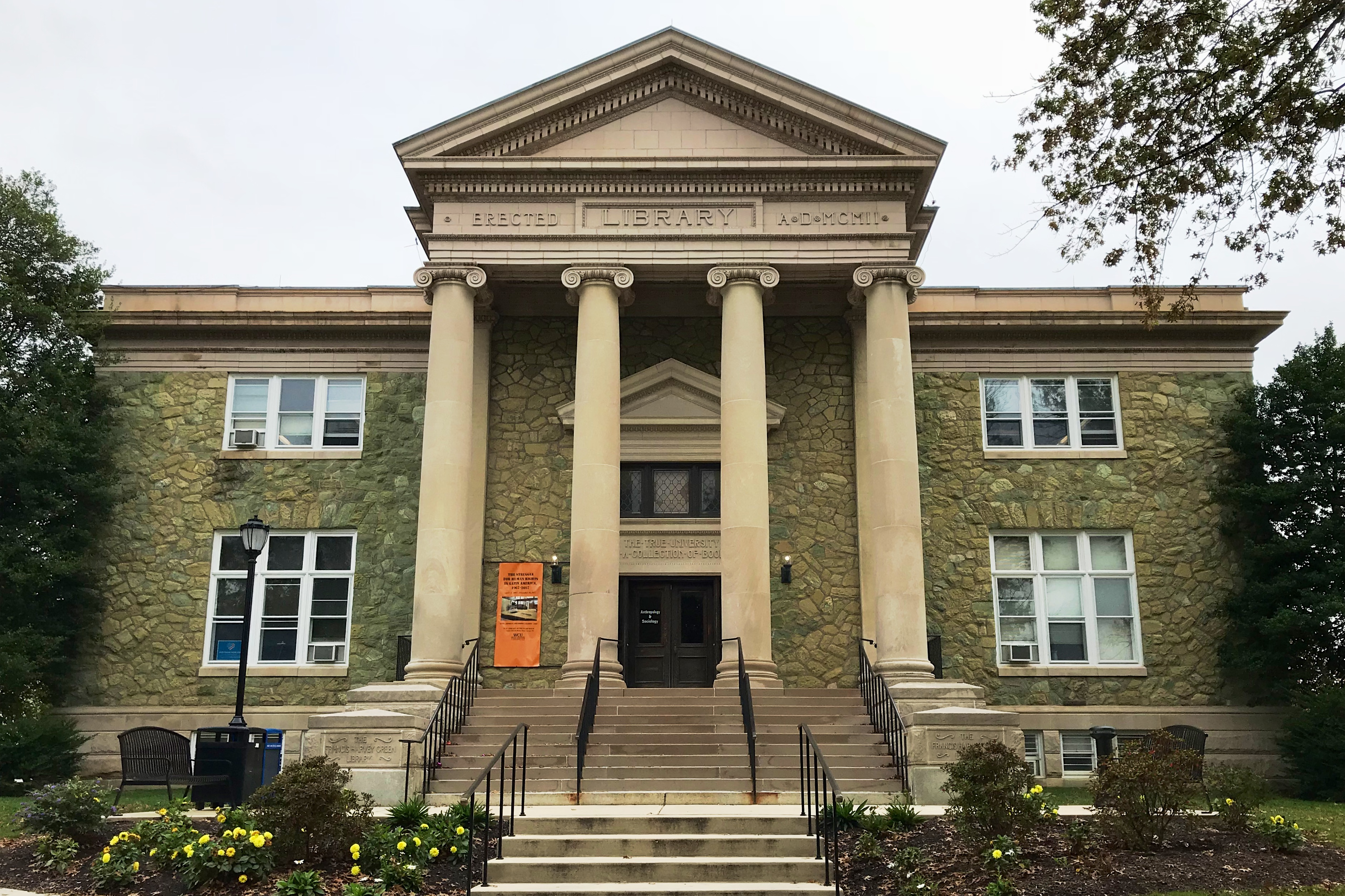
Old Library, West Chester

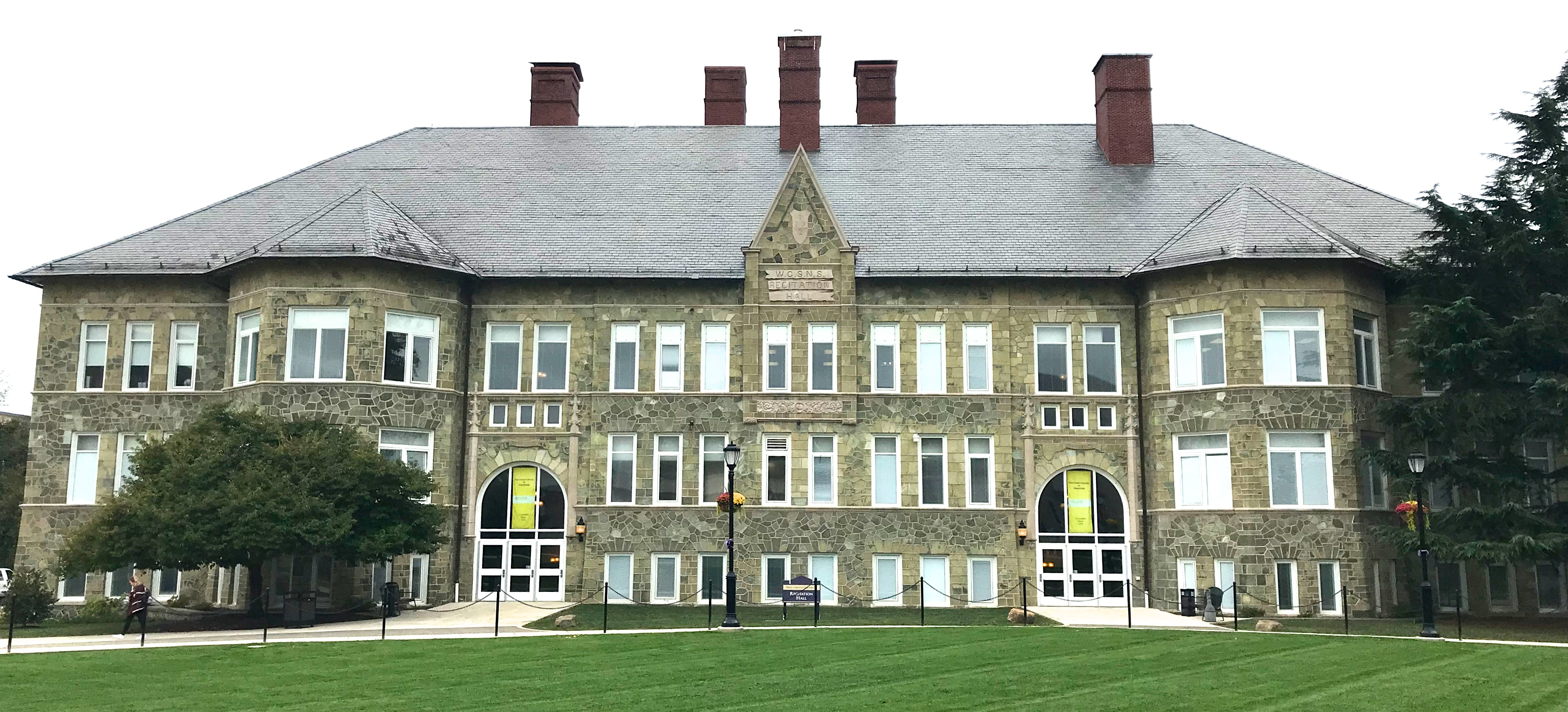
Recitation Hall

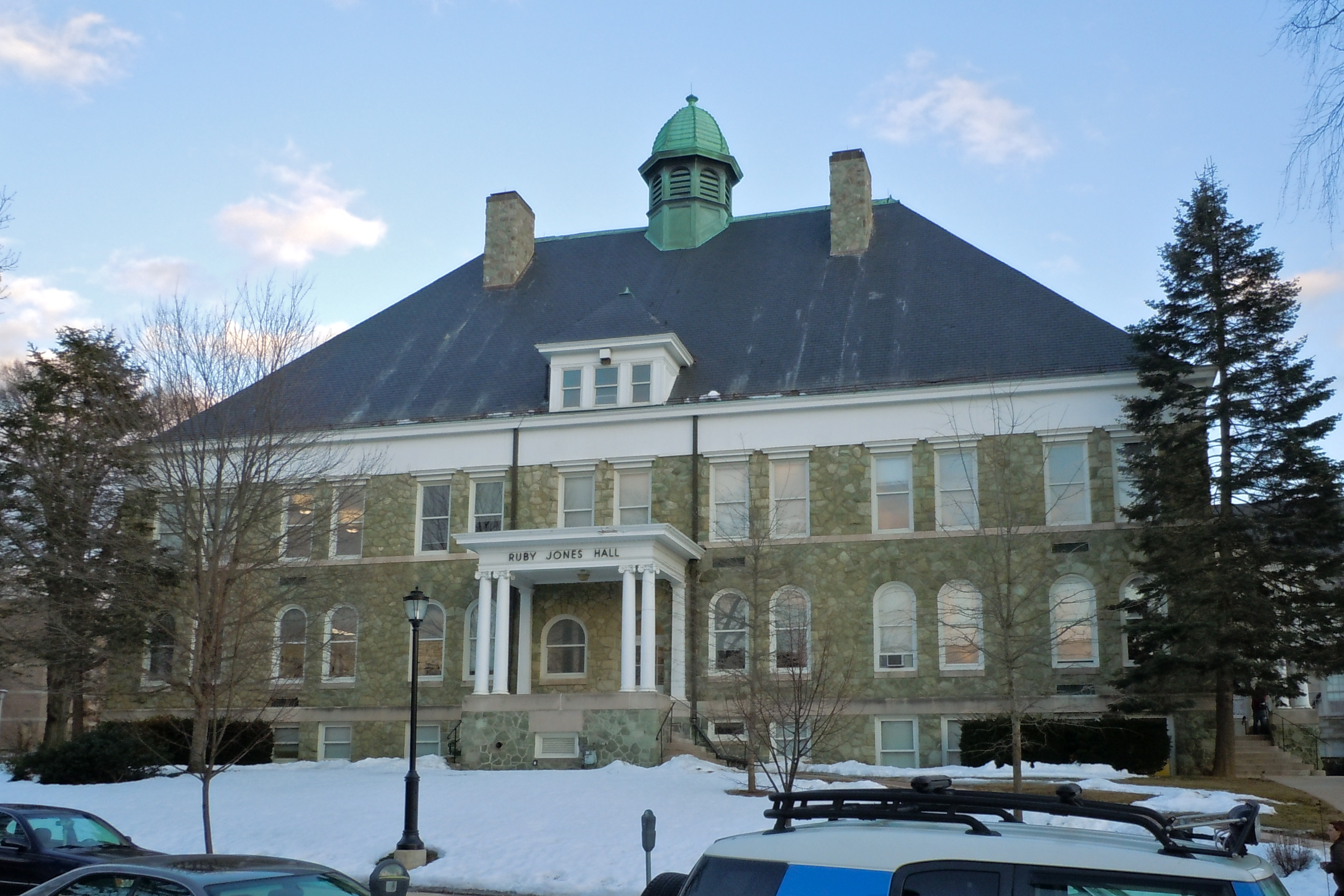
Ruby Jones Hall

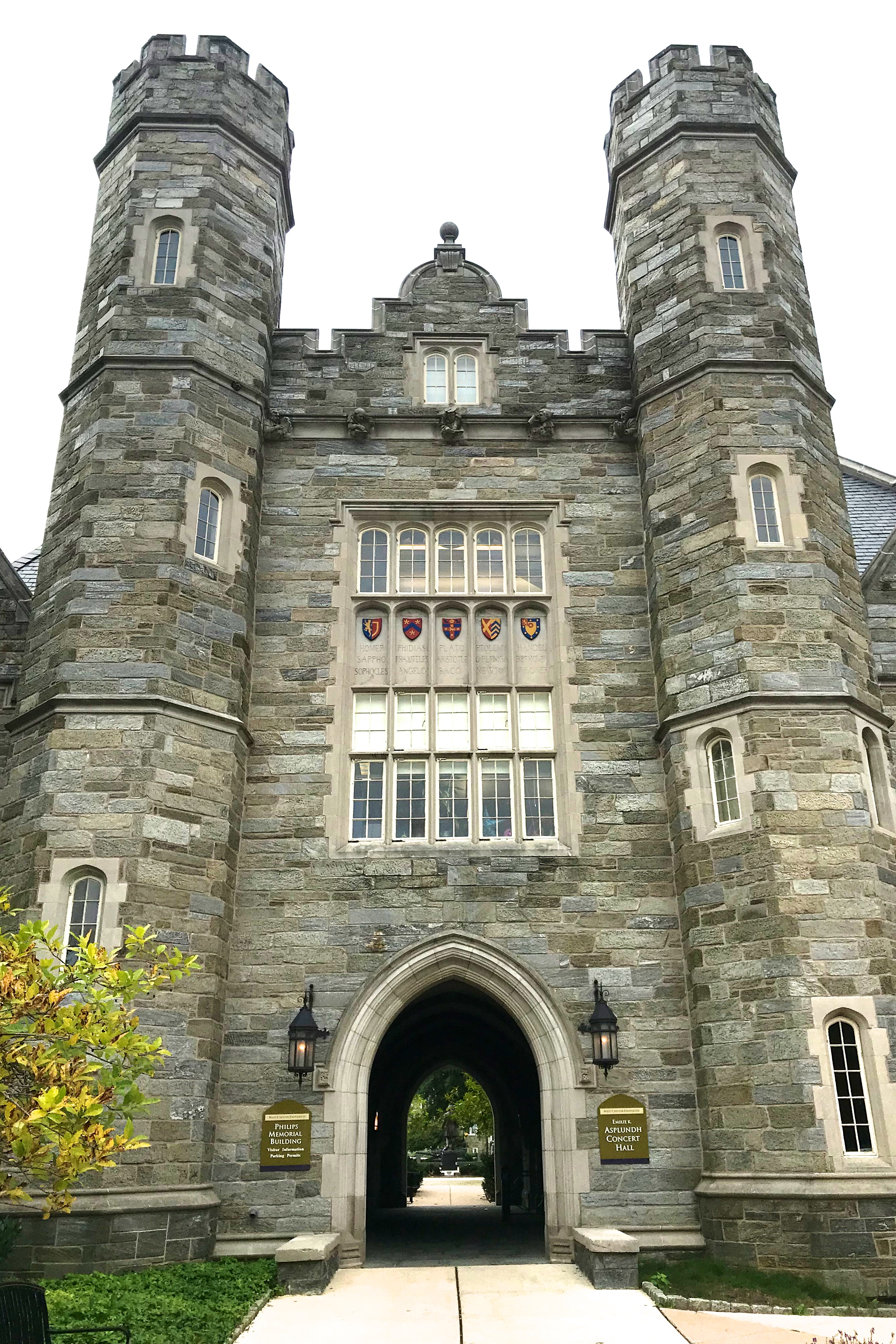
Philips Hall

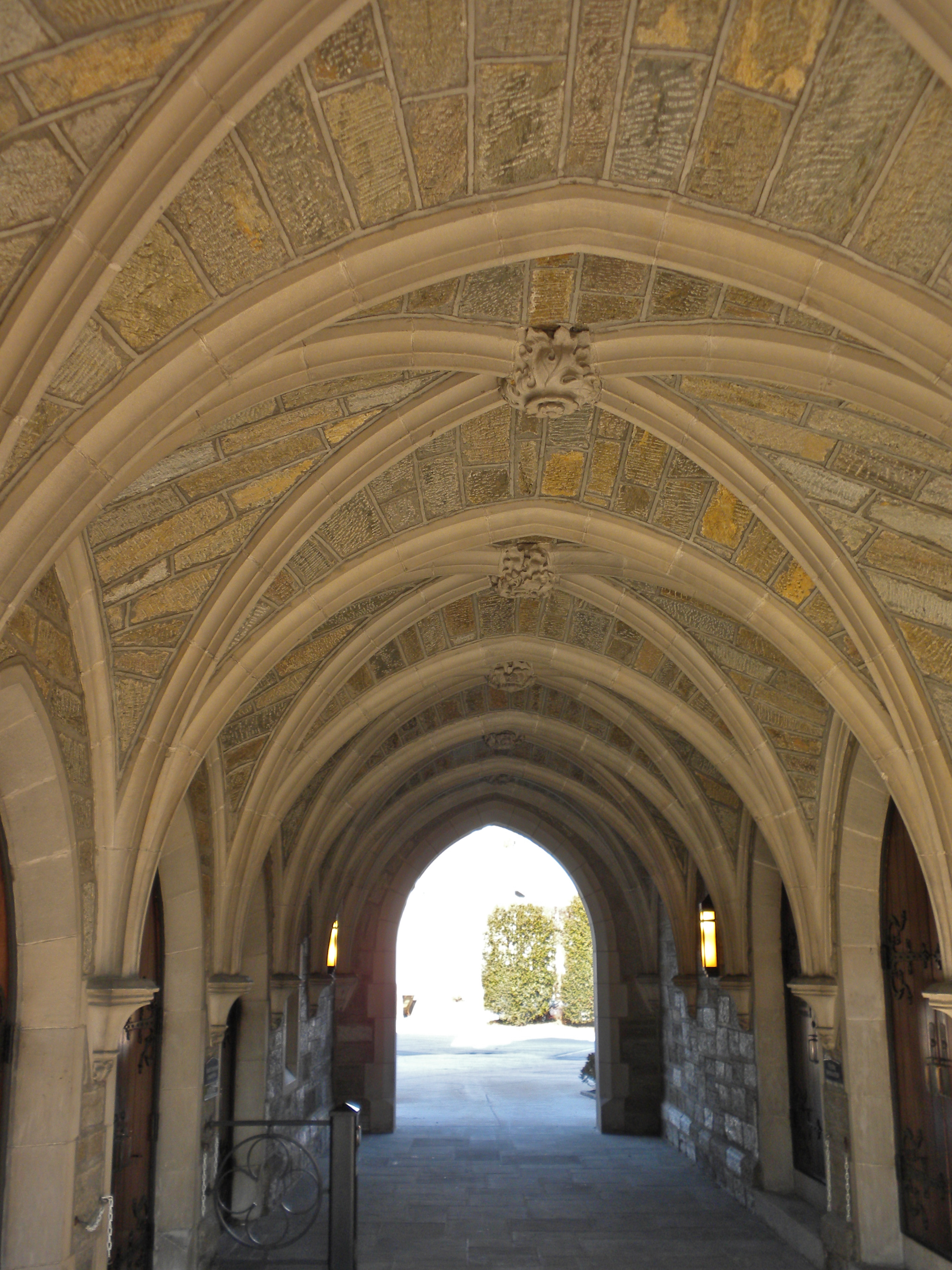
Whispering archway

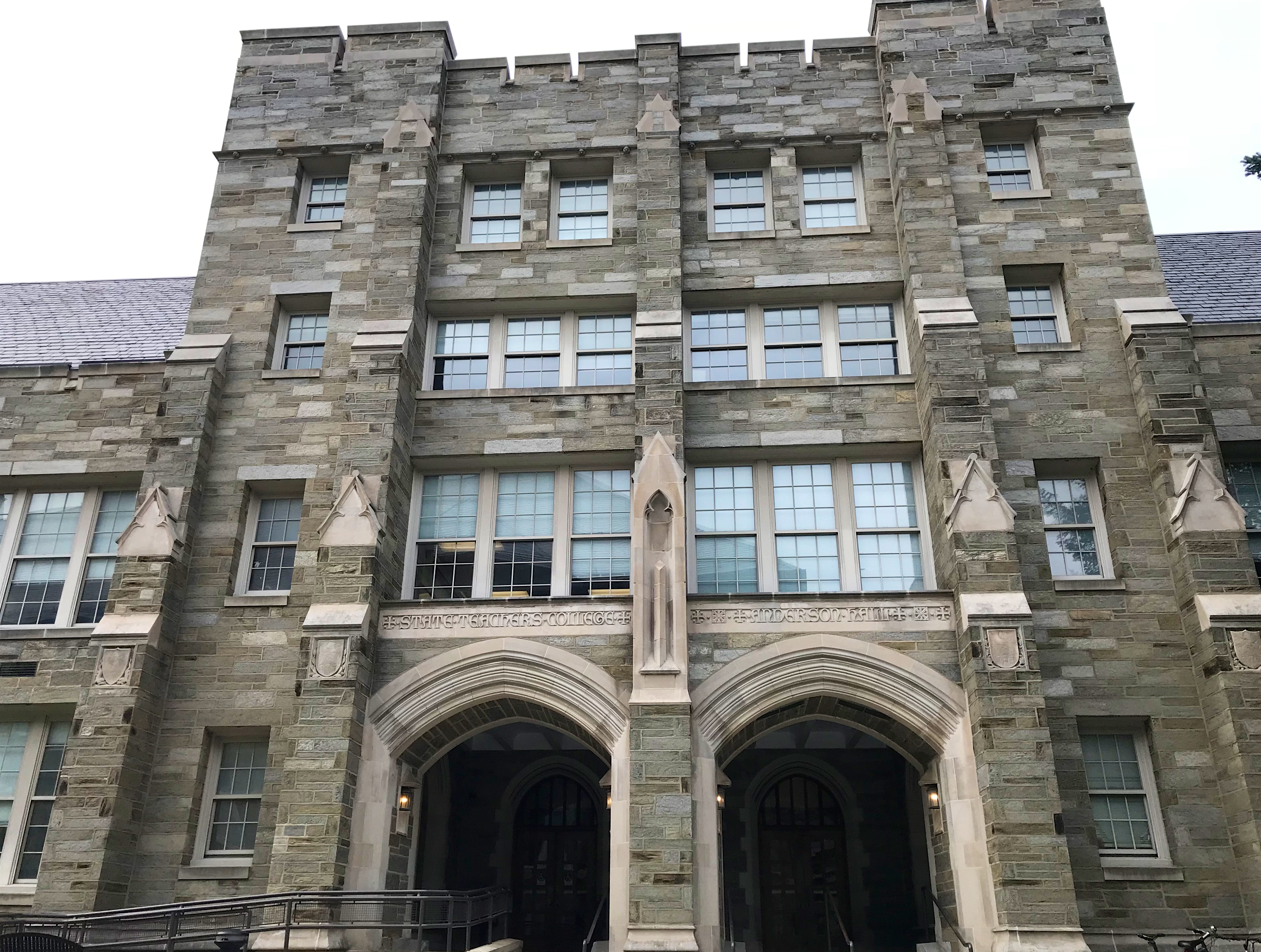
Anderson Hall

== Academics ==
Undergraduate demographics as of Fall 2023
Race and ethnicity	Total
White	74%
Black	11%
Hispanic	8%
Two or more races	4%
Asian	3%
Unknown	1%
Economic diversity
Low-income (Note: The percentage of students who received an income-based federal Pell grant intended for low-income students.)	25%
Affluent (Note: The percentage of students who are a part of the American middle class at the bare minimum.)	75%

Academic rankings

Regional
- U.S. News & World Report: 50

National
- Forbes: 307

The university is accredited by the Middle States Commission on Higher Education and classified among "R2: Doctoral Universities – High research activity". At the undergraduate level, the university offers Bachelor of Arts, Bachelor of Science, Bachelor of Fine Arts, and Bachelor of Music degrees. Paraprofessional studies are available in law, medicine, and theology. In cooperation with the Pennsylvania State University, Columbia University, and Thomas Jefferson University, West Chester University offers a 3–2 dual-degree program combining liberal arts, physics, and engineering. Also available are early admission assurance programs with Pennsylvania State University College of Medicine, Philadelphia College of Osteopathic Medicine and Temple University School of Medicine. The university provides special admission opportunities and scholarships to the Widener School of Law–Harrisburg Campus. At the graduate level, West Chester University offers master's (M.A., M.B.A., M.Ed., M.M., M.P.A., M.P.H., M.S., M.S.W., M.S.N., M.U.R.P.) and doctoral (DPA, DNP, Ed.D., Psy.D.) degrees.

West Chester was ranked 50th in the "Regional Universities North" category by U.S. News & World Report for 2020.

WCU's International Programs office helps send students abroad. The university participates in the National Student Exchange Program, in which students spend up to a year at any one of more than 170 member schools across the United States. Transfer of credit is a part of this program.

== Athletics ==
The athletic teams at West Chester University are named the Golden Rams. Students participate in NCAA Division II athletics in the Pennsylvania State Athletic Conference and Eastern College Athletic Conference. West Chester University has won national championships in women's basketball, women's lacrosse, women's swimming (the team was the DGWS champion in 1972), women's field hockey (including four AIAW titles from 1975 to 1978), and men's soccer. West Chester won the first-ever women's basketball national championship in 1969 and was on the losing end in the final game each of the following three years.

In 1961, the men's soccer team won the NCAA Division I Men's Soccer Championship. Jerry Yeagley was a player on WCU's championship team before going on to win six NCAA Championships and six National Coach of the Year Awards as the men's soccer coach at Indiana University. In addition, prior to the NCAA instituting a tournament format to decide the champion in 1959, the Golden Rams were voted the National Soccer Champions in 1950 by the Intercollegiate Soccer Football Association.

In 1977, 1979, and 1982, the boxing team won the National Collegiate Boxing Association national championship. In 1976, Edward Skalamera claimed the national title for his 147 lb. weight class while Joe Gery took the top position in the nation for his 180 lb. class.

In 2008, West Chester defeated C.W. Post College 13–12 to win the Division II women's lacrosse title. It was the second national title in the women's program history. WCUPA played in the NCAA tournament in 2010 (2nd place), 2011 (4th place), and 2012 (2nd place). The 2013 team was named Pennsylvania State Athletic Conference (PSAC) Champions. Ginny Martino's winning percentage is 80% over the last 17 years as head coach (250–60).

In 2012, the men's baseball Team claimed West Chester's first NCAA Division II college baseball national championship. The Golden Rams shut-out Delta State 9–0 in Cary, North Carolina. West Chester becomes the first team from the PSAC to win the national championship and just the third northern school to walk away with the title.

West Chester's women's field hockey team won the NCAA Division II championship in 2011, 2012, and 2019. The varsity women's rugby program also won the National Intercollegiate Rugby Association (NIRA) rugby national championship in 2019. The women's ice hockey Club won the Division II national championship in 2013. The men's lacrosse club won the Division II national championship in 2013 and 2015.

== Notable alumni ==
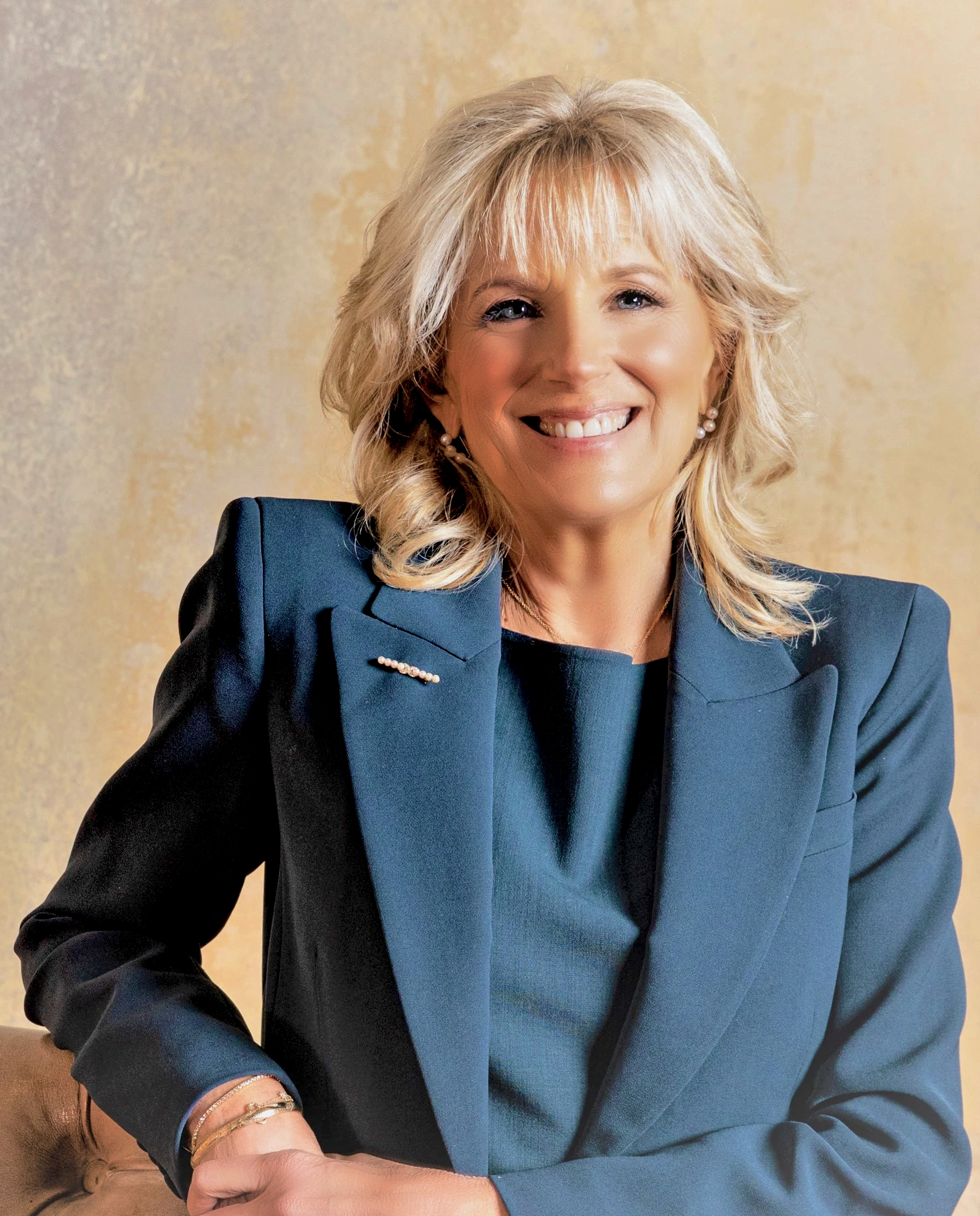
Jill Biden, First Lady of the United States (2020–2024) and Second Lady of the United States (2008–2016)

=== Politics and government ===
- Mary Ann Arty (1926–2000) — former member of the Pennsylvania House of Representatives
- Chris Asplen (b. 1954) — DNA policy expert and former Assistant United States Attorney for the US Attorney's Office in Washington, D.C.
- Jill Biden (b. 1951) (M.Ed. 1981) — American professor, former Second Lady of the United States, and former First Lady of the United States
- Tim Briggs (b. 1970) — member of the Pennsylvania House of Representatives
- Gloria Casarez (1971–2014) — an American civil rights leader and LGBT activist in Philadelphia.
- Carolyn Comitta (b. 1952) — financial officer, 58th Mayor of West Chester, former member of the Pennsylvania House of Representatives, and member of the Pennsylvania State Senate
- Jeff Gannon (b. 1957) — conservative columnist and author
- Molly Henderson (b. 1953) — former Commissioner of Lancaster County, Pennsylvania
- Albert W. Jefferis (1868–1942) — former member of the United States House of Representatives
- Stephen Kinsey (b. 1958) — member of the Pennsylvania House of Representatives
- John A. Lawless (b. 1957) — former member of the Pennsylvania House of Representatives
- F. Joseph Loeper (b. 1944) — former member of the Pennsylvania Senate, Republican Leader of the PA Senate, and Republican whip of the PA Senate
- Isaac James MacCollum (1889–1968) — physician and 11th Lieutenant Governor of Delaware
- Jose Miranda (b.1985) — former member of the Pennsylvania House of Representatives
- Joseph Miró (b. 1946) — former member of the Delaware House of Representatives
- Frank Noonan — former Pennsylvania State Police commissioner and Federal Bureau of Investigation agent
- Jennifer O'Mara (b. 1989) — member of the Pennsylvania House of Representatives
- Brian Munroe (b. 1974) — member of the Pennsylvania House of Representatives
- Joe Pitts (b. 1939) — former member of the United States House of Representatives
- Roy Reinard (b. 1954) — former member of the Pennsylvania House of Representatives
- John A. Rocco (b. 1936) — former member of the New Jersey General Assembly
- Barbara McIlvaine Smith (b. 1950) — former member of the Pennsylvania House of Representatives
- Tommy Tomlinson (b. 1945) — member of the Pennsylvania Senate
- Elinor Z. Taylor (1921–2010) — former member of the Pennsylvania House of Representatives
- Francis Tenaglio (b. 1949) — former member of the Pennsylvania House of Representatives
- Dan Truitt — engineer and former member of the Pennsylvania House of Representatives
- Curt Weldon (b. 1947; Class of 1969) — former member of the United States House of Representatives
- Dean Wink (b. 1944) — former speaker of the South Dakota House of Representatives

=== Business and industry ===
- Pat Croce (b. 1954) — American physical therapist, entrepreneur, sports team executive and owner, author, and TV personality; former team president of the Philadelphia 76ers
- Michael Dever (b. 1957) — businessman, futures trader, entrepreneur, and author; CEO of Brandywine Asset Management
- Philip M. Sharples (1857–1944) — inventor and entrepreneur who ran largest industrial enterprise in West Chester history
- George Wackenhut (1919–2004) — founder of Wackenhut private security corporation

=== Arts and entertainment ===
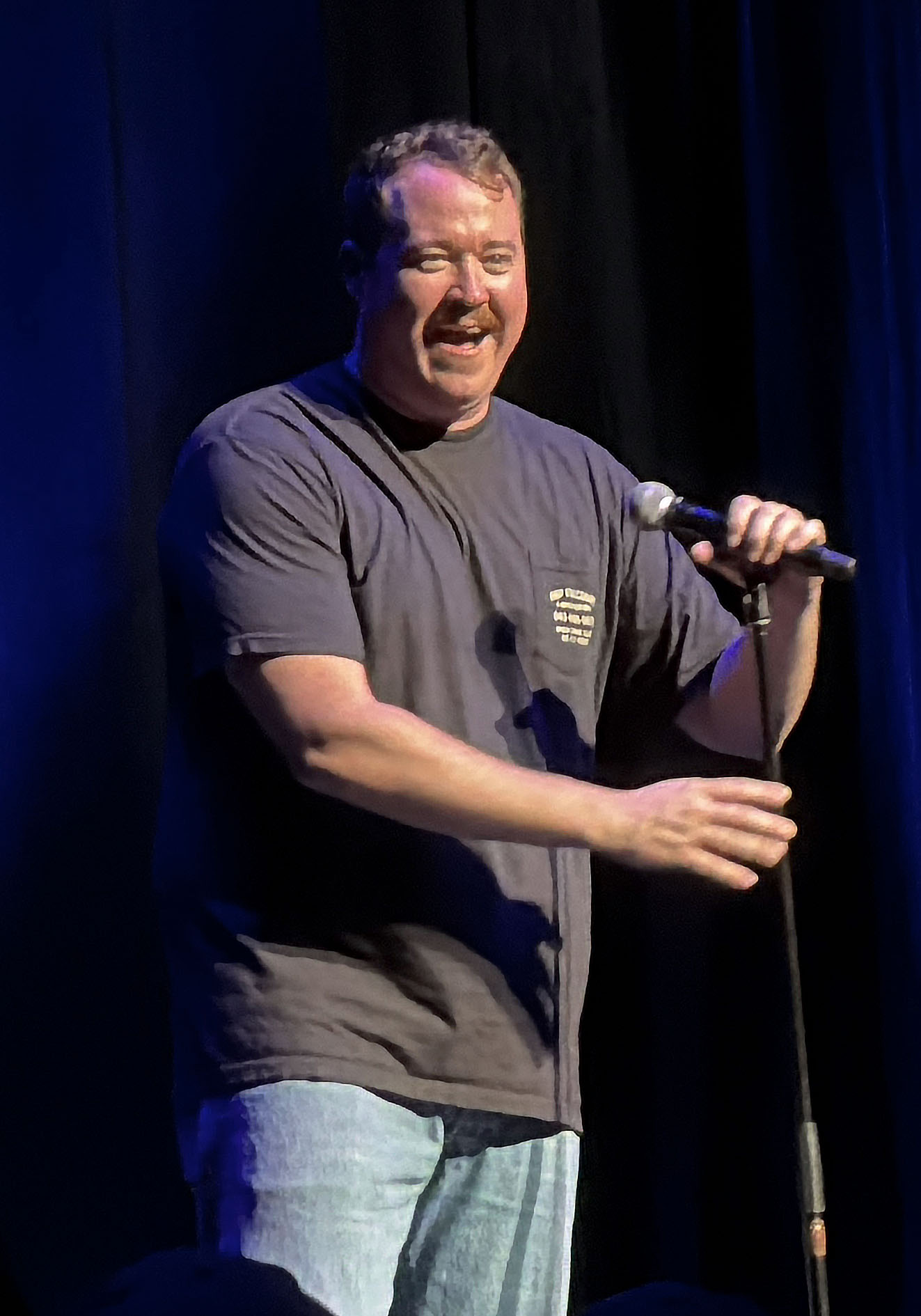
Comedian and actor Shane Gillis

- Jessica Barth (b. 1980) — actress
- Keith Brion (b. 1933) — director of bands of Yale University
- Howard J. Buss (b. 1951) — composer of contemporary classical music
- Bob Curnow (b. 1941) — trombonist, conductor, composer, arranger, music producer, educator, and music publisher
- Melissa Dunphy (b. 1980) — composer of classical music
- Derek Frey (b. 1973) — film producer and director, head of Tim Burton productions
- Shane Gillis (b. 1987) — stand-up comedian and podcaster
- Donald Yetter Gardner (1913–2004) — songwriter and educator
- Joey Graziadei (b. 1995) — contestant on The Bachelorette and lead on The Bachelor
- Thom Hannum (b. 1957) — band director at the University of Massachusetts, member of the Drum Corps International Hall of Fame
- Barry Jenner (1941–2016) — police officer and actor (1974-2016)
- Billy Kametz (1987–2022) — voice actor
- Rodney Linderman aka Rodney Anonymous (b. 1963) — vocalist and keyboardist, The Dead Milkmen
- Mandy Mango (b. 1996) — contestant on RuPaul's Drag Race
- Matthew McGrory (1973–2005) — actor, Guinness World Records holder for tallest actor and biggest feet
- Larry Mendte (b. 1957) — news anchor and radio talk show host, honored with receiving the Edward R. Murrow Award
- George N. Parks (1953–2010) — former band director at the University of Massachusetts
- Asher Roth (b. 1985 ) — rapper
- Paul Ruditis — author
- Elsie Singmaster (1879—1958) — author, 1934 Newbery Honor recipient
- Heidi Strobel (b. 1978) — Survivor: The Amazon contestant
- Nafessa Williams (b. 1985) — actress
- Christina Wilson (b. 1979) (attended) — American chef and reality television personality
- Tom Wright (b. 1952) — actor

=== Sports ===
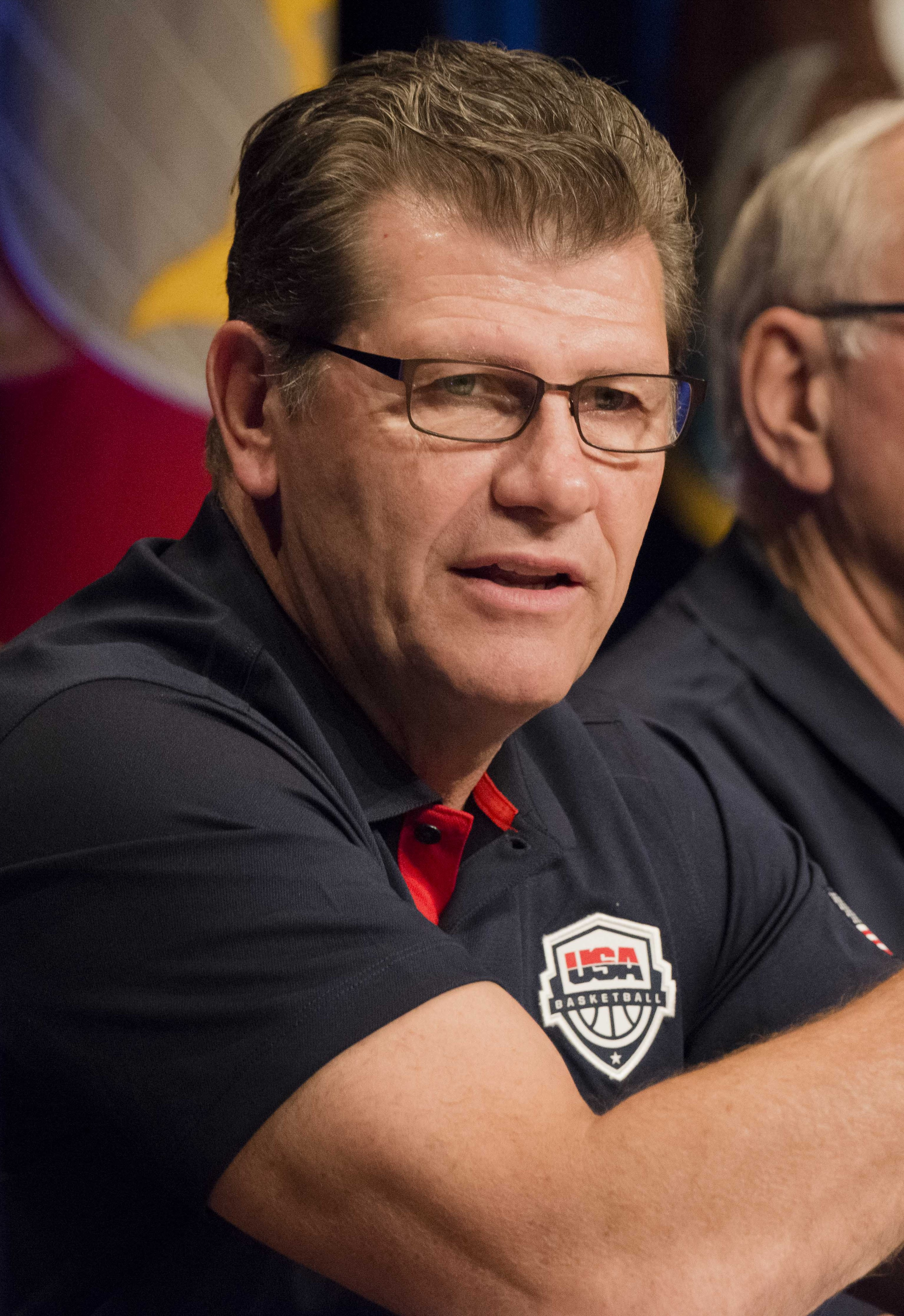
Basketball Hall of Famer Geno Auriemma with Team USA

- Geno Auriemma (b. 1954) (B.A. 1981) — Basketball Hall of Famer and head women's basketball coach at the University of Connecticut
- Max Barsky (b. 1991) — professional wrestler best known by his ring name David Starr
- Dean Demopoulos (b. 1954) — collegiate and NBA basketball coach
- Kevin Guskiewicz (b. 1966) — sports medicine researcher, as well as a Kenan Distinguished Professor at the University of North Carolina (UNC), Dean of the College of Arts and Sciences at UNC, and Interim Chancellor at UNC
- Eddie Layton (1925–2004) — organist and New York Sports Hall of Fame member
- Steve Maxwell (b. 1952) — named one of the top 100 trainers in the United States by Men's Journal
- Pat Meiser — named one of the nation's top 50 women's sports executives by Sports Business Journal. Former Penn State head women's basketball coach and athletic director at University of Hartford
- Ed T. Rush (b. 1942) — former NBA referee
- Cathy Rush (b. 1947) (B.S. 1968, M.Ed. 1972) former Immaculata University head women's basketball coach
- Joe Senser (b. 1956) — former NFL football player
- Ralph Tamm (b. 1966) — former NFL football player
- Tony Thornton (1959–2009) professional boxer
- Tank Toland (b. 1973) — professional wrestler
- Marian Washington (b. 1946) — former women's basketball coach., inducted into the Women's Basketball Hall of Fame
- Chuck Weber (1930–2017) — former NFL football player
- Joey Wendle (b. 1990) — former MLB baseball player with various teams
- Lee Woodall (b. 1969) — former NFL football player
- Dean Wink (b. 1941) — former NFL football player
- Jerry Yeagley (b. 1940; Class of 1960) — coached Indiana University to 6 NCAA Soccer Championships

=== Others ===
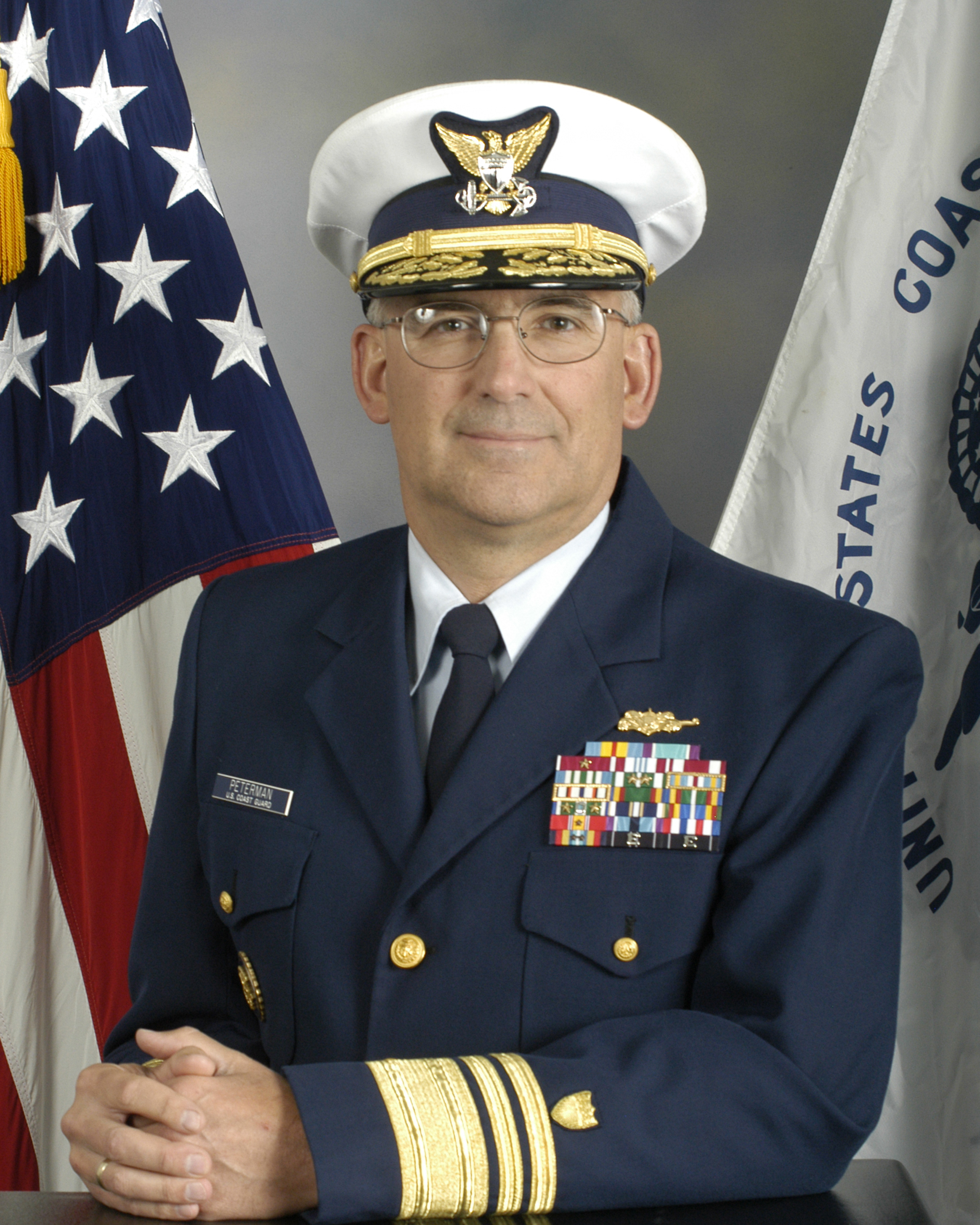
United States Vice-Admiral Brian Peterman

- Dirk Ballendorf (1939–2013) — historian and professor, specialist on Micronesian culture, politics current affairs, and history
- Leon Bass (1928–2013) — educator and African-American soldier in World War II who witnessed the Buchenwald concentration camp; participant in the International Liberators Conference
- Jerry G. Beck Jr. (b. 1954) — US Army brigadier general
- Tyree Blocker (1953-2024) — 21st commissioner of the Pennsylvania State Police
- Michael Brune (b. 1971) — executive director of the Sierra Club and the Rainforest Action Network.
- Howard Dodson (b. 1939) — scholar who is the Director of the Moorland-Spingarn Research Center and Howard University Libraries, and was formerly the director of the Schomburg Center for Research in Black Culture in Harlem
- John Doebley — botanical geneticist, anthropologist, and professor
- Henry Theodore Hallman (1904–1999) — professor and artist
- Francis Harvey Green (1861–1951) — educator, poet, and lecturer; former Chair of English at West Chester University; headmaster of the Pennington School
- Miles D. McCarthy (1914–1995) — professor of biology. One of the five founding faculty members of California State University, Fullerton; served as president of California State University, Fullerton as well as Chairman of the Biology Department and Vice President for Academic Affairs
- Francis Noonan — 20th commissioner of the Pennsylvania State Police
- Frank E. Pawlowski — 19th commissioner of the Pennsylvania State Police
- Vice Admiral D. Brian Peterman — assumed command of United States Coast Guard Atlantic Area
- Asaf Romirowsky — Middle East historian
- David Roselle (b. 1939; Class of 1961) — American mathematician and served as the ninth president at the University of Kentucky and the 25th president of the University of Delaware
- Herman T. Tavani — academic, scholar in information and computer ethics, and Professor Emeritus of Philosophy at Rivier University, past president of the International Society for Ethics and Information Technology and a recipient of the Weizenbaum Award in 2019
- Stanley Weintraub (1929–2019) — historian, biographer, and professor at Penn State University
- Geralyn Wolf (b. 1947) — former Bishop of Rhode Island
