= Jeffrey B. Miller =

American law enforcement official

Jeffrey Miller

18th Commissioner of the Pennsylvania State Police
- In office March 24, 2003 – August 8, 2008
- Governor: Ed Rendell
- Preceded by: Paul J. Evanko
- Succeeded by: Frank Pawlowski

Personal details
- Born: Harrisburg, Pennsylvania, U.S.
- Education: University of South Florida (AA); Elizabethtown College (BS); Pennsylvania State University (MS)
- Profession: Law enforcement

Jeffrey B. Miller is a law enforcement official who served as the 18th commissioner of the Pennsylvania State Police.

Miller served as the Chief Security Officer for the National Football League (NFL) from 2012 to 2016 and vice president for security for the Kansas City Chiefs from 2018 to 2021.

Miller, a native of Harrisburg, Pennsylvania, served in that position from March 24, 2003, after being confirmed by the Pennsylvania State Senate, until August 8, 2008. Miller left the Pennsylvania State Police to work for the National Football League, where he served in the security department ending his tenure in 2016 as the senior vice president and Chief Security Officer. Miller served as a member of the DHS Homeland Security Advisory Council.

In 2025, he was appointed to review arson attack on Pennsylvania Governor's Residence arson.

== Education ==
Miller is a 1981 graduate of Central Dauphin High School in Harrisburg, Pennsylvania. He was awarded an A.A. by the University of South Florida. Miller later earned his bachelor of professional studies in criminal justice, from Elizabethtown College and a Master of Public Administration from the Pennsylvania State University.

== Professional career ==
=== Pennsylvania State Police ===
Miller enlisted with the state police in 1984 and became a member of fifty-sixth graduating class of the Pennsylvania State Police Academy in Hershey, Pennsylvania. He then moved through the ranks, attaining: Corporal in 1988, Sergeant in 1990, Lieutenant in 1993, Captain in 1995, and Major in January 2002.

On January 9, 2003, Governor Edward G. Rendell nominated Miller to become 18th Commissioner of the Pennsylvania State Police, a Cabinet-level post. Col. Miller was unanimously confirmed by the Senate of Pennsylvania March 24, 2003.

Miller is known for his handling of the West Nickel Mines School shooting in Nickel Mines, Pennsylvania.

Miller retired from the PSP on August 8, 2008. Command was temporarily transferred to Lt. Colonel Frank Pawlowski.

=== Amish School Shooting (2006) ===
On October 2, 2006, Miller directed the Pennsylvania State Police response to the West Nickel Mines Amish School shooting in Lancaster County, Pennsylvania. A gunman, Charles Carl Roberts IV, entered a one-room Amish schoolhouse, took hostages, and shot 11 girls, killing five, before taking his own life as police stormed the building.

As Commissioner of the Pennsylvania State Police, Miller oversaw the investigation and served as the lead spokesperson during the crisis. He provided regular press briefings, confirming details of the attack and describing the investigation into the shooter’s motives. Miller emphasized the detailed planning of the crime, noting that Roberts specifically targeted female students. His direct communication style drew widespread attention, with national and international media citing his updates as the authoritative account of events.

=== National Football League ===
After his state service, Miller joined the National Football League (NFL) in 2008, initially as Director of Strategic Security Programs. In 2012, he was promoted to Senior Vice President and Chief Security Officer, overseeing league-wide security operations, crisis management, and event security. He retired from the NFL in 2016.

=== Private sector and consulting ===
After leaving the NFL, Miller became Senior Vice President at MSA Security, a New York–based firm specializing in venue protection, crisis communications, K-9 operations and counterterrorism services. In 2017 he established Jeffrey Miller Consulting, LLC, which provides security consulting for professional sports teams, universities, law enforcement agencies, and entertainment venues in the United States and abroad. From 2018 to 2021, Miller was Vice President of Security for the Kansas City Chiefs, before transitioning into his current role as a Senior Security Consultant for the organization.

=== Publications ===
Miller has written articles on venue security and fan safety, including contributions to Security Magazine. He is also the author of the novel Desert Canyon (2024).

=== Professional affiliations ===
Miller has served on the U.S. Department of Homeland Security Homeland Security Advisory Council, is a lifetime member of the International Association of Chiefs of Police, the FBI National Academy Associates, and previously a member of the International Security Management Association. He has also taught criminal justice and police management at Elizabethtown College, Pennsylvania State University, and Harrisburg Area Community College.

== Awards and recognition ==
Miller has received numerous awards for his contributions to law enforcement and security, including the Distinguished Alumni Award from Pennsylvania State University (2009), the Career Achievement Award from the National Center for Spectator Sports Safety and Security (2016), and recognition as one of Security Magazine’s “Most Influential People in Security” (2013). He was also awarded an Honorary Doctor of Public Service degree from Elizabethtown College in 2013.

== Recent activities ==
In April 2025, Miller was appointed by Pennsylvania State Police Commissioner Christopher Paris to lead an independent security review following an arson attack on the governor’s mansion in Harrisburg, which forced Governor Josh Shapiro and his family to evacuate. The review, conducted through Miller’s firm, Jeffrey Miller Consulting, was tasked with evaluating monitoring systems, security detail assignments, and response protocols, and providing the Governor with detailed findings and recommendations to prevent future attacks. His appointment was intended to provide an external assessment of the security failures surrounding the incident.

== Personal life ==
Miller resides in the San Diego with his wife Andrea, and their two daughters.
