= West Nickel Mines School shooting =

2006 mass shooting in Pennsylvania, U.S.

- Location: 39°57′37″N 76°5′4″W; Bart Township, Pennsylvania, U.S.
- Date: October 2, 2006; 20 years ago c. 10:25 – c. 11:07 a.m.
- Target: Female students at West Nickel Mines School
- Attack type: Femicide; pedicide; school shooting; hostage taking; murder–suicide; mass shooting; mass murder; misogynist terrorism
- Weapons: Springfield Armory XD 9mm semi-automatic pistol; Browning BPS 12 gauge pump-action shotgun; Ruger M77 .30-06 bolt-action rifle (unused)
- Deaths: 7 (including the perpetrator and a victim who died from complications in 2024)
- Injuries: 4
- Perpetrator: Charles Carl Roberts IV

On October 2, 2006, a mass shooting occurred at the West Nickel Mines School, an Amish one-room schoolhouse in the Old Order Amish community of Nickel Mines, a village in Bart Township, Pennsylvania. Thirty-two-year-old Charles Carl Roberts IV took hostages and shot ten girls (aged 6–13), killing six unsuspecting citizens (five in the initial incident, and a sixth who succumbed to her injuries in 2024), before dying by suicide in the schoolhouse. The emphasis on forgiveness and reconciliation in the Amish community's response was widely discussed by the national media. The West Nickel Mines School was later demolished, and a new one-room schoolhouse, the New Hope School, was built at another location. It is the deadliest school shooting in Pennsylvania history.

== Incident ==
Roberts backed a pickup truck to the front of the Amish schoolhouse and entered it at approximately 10:25 a.m. EDT, soon after the children had returned from recess. He asked the teacher, Emma Mae Zook, and the students if they had seen a missing clevis pin on the road. Survivors said he mumbled his words and did not make direct eye contact. After they said they had not seen a clevis pin, he went back to his truck and reentered the school holding a Springfield Armory XD 9mm handgun. He ordered the boys to help him carry items from the truck into the classroom. Zook and her mother, who was visiting, took this opportunity to escape and run toward a nearby farm for help. Roberts saw them leave and ordered one of the boys to stop them, threatening to shoot everyone if they got away.

They reached the farm, where they asked Amos Smoker to call 9-1-1. Meanwhile, the boys carried in lumber, a shotgun, a stun-gun, wires, chains, nails, tools, a small bag, and a wooden board with multiple sets of metal eyehooks. The bag held a change of clothes, toilet paper, candles, and flexible plastic ties. Using wooden boards, Roberts barricaded the front door.

=== Hostages taken ===
Roberts ordered the girls to line up against the chalkboard and allowed a pregnant woman, three parents with infants, and all remaining boys to exit. One girl, nine-year-old Emma Fisher, escaped without her older sister.

=== Police and emergency personnel ===
Amos Smoker's 9-1-1 call was recorded at 10:36 a.m. An article, "Revisiting the Amish Schoolhouse Massacre", described the situation before the arrival of the first Pennsylvania State Police troopers: "An Amish adult male from this farm, with his two large dogs, took the bold opportunity to stealthily approach the windowless back wall of the schoolhouse. Hoping for an opportunity to help the little girls, he slowly crept around one side of the wooden structure and positioned himself as an observer next to a side window". It continued, "Observing that the first police patrol vehicle to approach the scene was not slowing down to stop, the Amish man quickly withdrew from his hiding place and sprinted towards the roadway to wave down the trooper, who did a fast U-turn and parked. That would be the last successful attempt at an unnoticed move upon the building by anyone".

The first trooper had arrived at approximately 10:42, about six or seven minutes after the 9-1-1 call. The police, while waiting for reinforcements, attempted to communicate with Roberts via the PA system in their patrol cars. They asked Roberts to throw out his weapons and exit the schoolhouse. Roberts refused, demanding that the officers leave. By 11:00 a.m. a large crowd—including police officers, emergency medical technicians, and residents of the village—had assembled both outside the schoolhouse and at a nearby ambulance staging area. County and state police dispatchers had briefly established telephone contact with Roberts as he continued to threaten violence against the children.

During interviews conducted later, it became apparent that all of the girls recognized the danger they were in. Some conversed among themselves throughout the ordeal. Shortly before Roberts began shooting, two sisters, Marian and Barbara Fisher, ages 13 and 11, requested that they be shot first so that the others might be spared. Barbara was wounded, while Marian was killed.

=== Shooting ===
At approximately 11:07 a.m., Roberts began shooting the victims. State troopers immediately approached. As the first trooper in line reached a window, the shooting stopped abruptly; Roberts had committed suicide. During the shooting, he fired three times with the shotgun, including a shot aimed at the State troopers which missed, and at least 13 rounds from his pistol before firing one last 9mm round into his head.

== Perpetrator ==
Undated photograph of Roberts

Charles Carl Roberts IV (December 7, 1973 – October 2, 2006), thirty-two years of age, was a milk tanker truck driver who served several Amish farms in the Nickel Mines area (including some of the victims' families). He had three children and a wife, for whom he left four separate suicide notes. When State Police Commissioner Jeffrey B. Miller interviewed Roberts's co-workers, they claimed to have noticed a "change" in him during the months immediately before the shooting. They also claimed that he seemed to return to normal in the week just before the shooting. Miller hypothesizes that this "calm" may have been when he (Roberts) decided to go through with the shooting. Miller also noted that Roberts's neighbors reported his mood as unusually jovial during this period. Just five days before the shooting, a similar hostage crisis and shooting had occurred in Colorado, and a possible connection was investigated.

Roberts was at the time a resident of nearby Georgetown, an unincorporated area of Bart Township. His wife last saw him at 8:45 a.m. when they walked their children to a bus stop before she left. When Mrs. Roberts returned home a little before 11:00 a.m., she discovered four suicide notes, one addressed to herself and one to each of their three children. Roberts telephoned his wife from the schoolhouse using his cellphone and told her that he had molested two young female relatives (between the ages of 3 and 5) 20 years previously (when he was 12) and had been daydreaming about molesting again.

In one note Roberts left behind, he said the death of their daughter, who died approximately 20 minutes after birth nine years before the shooting, had "changed my life forever." In that note, he also said that, since her death, he had been "filled with so much hate" toward himself and God. He also stated that he had "been having dreams for the past couple of years about doing what he did 20 years ago and he has dreams of doing them again", according to Miller. On October 4, 2006, the two relatives whom Roberts said he molested 20 years ago told police that no such abuse had ever happened. K-Y Jelly, a lubricant sometimes used as an aid to sexual intercourse, was also found in the schoolhouse among Roberts's possessions, but authorities stated that there was no evidence of any of the victims being sexually assaulted during the incident.

== 911 calls and timeline of events ==
Several 911 calls were made on October 2, 2006. Transcripts of the shooting-related 911 calls were released to the public on October 10, 2006. The known callers include Amos Smoker (the man who made the first call reporting an armed invader at the school), Roberts (the shooter), and his wife Marie. The local 911 dispatchers sent the calls to the local Lancaster County law enforcement dispatch or the state police. Lancaster County cannot provide transcripts for the calls transferred outside of Lancaster County dispatch, as such calls transferred to the state police.

At 10:35 a.m., Amos Smoker called 911 at the behest of the school teacher, Emma Mae Zook, who had run from the schoolhouse to a nearby farm seeking help. About the time of this initial call for help, the shooter released a pregnant woman, three parents with infants, and all 15 male students.

The first police officer arrived approximately six minutes later. As the first few troopers approached the building, Roberts ordered them to leave, or he would start shooting. An agitated Roberts continued to demand that the police leave as the troopers attempted to communicate with Roberts via the PA system in their police cars.

At 10:41, a second caller reported the incident and was transferred to the State Police. At 10:55, Roberts was reaching the final part of his plan. He had arranged the bound girls near the chalkboard at the front of the classroom. Roberts made two cellphone calls, one to his wife and the next to police. He warned the 911 dispatcher that if state police were not off the property in two seconds, he would kill the children. The dispatcher attempted to delay him and transfer the call to the State Police, but Roberts ended the call. Two of the girls then began negotiating with Roberts. They pleaded for him to shoot them first. This allowed the girls a little extra time for possible rescue. Shortly before 11:00 a.m., Mrs. Roberts returned home from her regular Bible study group. Soon after finding a suicide note her husband left for her on the kitchen table and a brief and disturbing emotional telephone call from her husband, Mrs. Roberts called emergency services. The 911 dispatcher connected her, by telephone, to the State Police. At approximately 11:07 a.m., Roberts carried out his threats as the sound of rapid gunfire was heard.

== Aftermath ==
After the police entered the schoolhouse, all of the wounded girls were taken to hospitals. Two had died in the school house, one was pronounced dead on arrival at Lancaster General Hospital, and two sisters survived until the early hours of October 3 when their life support was ended. The surviving victims of the attack were taken to Lancaster General Hospital, stabilized, and then transferred to hospitals with pediatric trauma care. Three children were admitted to Penn State Children's Hospital, four to Children's Hospital of Philadelphia, and one to Christiana Hospital in Newark, Delaware, reported a state police spokesman. One child was initially transported to the Reading Hospital and Medical Center via helicopter and then transported to the Children's Hospital of Philadelphia after being stabilized. Reports stated that three of the girls were shot "execution-style" in the back of the head, with one dying in the arms of a trooper.

The ages of the victims ranged from six to thirteen. According to The Washington Post, police and coroner accounts of the children's wounds differed dramatically; Pennsylvania State Police Commissioner Jeffrey B. Miller said Roberts shot his victims in the head at close range, with 17 or 18 shots fired in all, including the one he used to take his own life as police stormed into the school by breaking through the window glass. Janice Ballenger, a deputy coroner in Lancaster County, Pennsylvania, counted at least a dozen shotgun pellet-inflicted wounds in one child alone before asking a colleague to take over and continue for her.

Inside the school, Ballenger said, "There was not one desk, not one chair, in the whole schoolroom that was not splattered with either blood or glass. There were bullet holes everywhere, everywhere". As a result of their actions, State Police Commissioner Jeffrey B. Miller presented the State Police Medal of Honor to ten Pennsylvania State Troopers in appreciation for their efforts to assist the victims. Local police officers and emergency personnel were presented commendations by the Bart Township Fire Company.

=== Amish community response ===
On the day of the shooting, a grandfather of one of the murdered Amish girls was heard warning some young relatives not to hate the killer, saying, "We must not think evil of this man". Another Amish father noted, "He had a mother and a wife and a soul and now he's standing before a just God". Jack Meyer, a member of the Brethren community living near the Amish in Lancaster County, explained: "I don't think there's anybody here that wants to do anything but forgive and not only reach out to those who have suffered a loss in that way but to reach out to the family of the man who committed these acts".

A Roberts family spokesman said an Amish neighbor comforted the Roberts family hours after the shooting and extended forgiveness to them. Amish community members visited and comforted Roberts's widow, parents and parents-in-law. One Amish man held Roberts's sobbing father in his arms, reportedly for as long as an hour, to comfort him. The Amish also established a charitable fund for the family of the shooter. About 30 members of the Amish community attended Roberts's funeral. Marie Roberts, the widow of the killer, was one of the few outsiders invited to the funeral of one of the victims.

Marie Roberts wrote an open letter to her Amish neighbors, thanking them for their forgiveness, grace, and mercy. She wrote, "Your love for our family has helped to provide the healing we so desperately need. Gifts you've given have touched our hearts in a way no words can describe. Your compassion has reached beyond our family, beyond our community, and is changing our world, and for this we sincerely thank you." The Amish do not normally accept charity; still, because of the extreme nature of the tragedy, donations were accepted. Richie Lauer, director of the Anabaptist Foundation, said the Amish community, whose religious beliefs prohibit them from having health insurance, will likely use the donations to help pay the medical costs of the children who were hospitalized.

Some commentators criticized the quick and complete forgiveness with which the Amish responded, arguing that forgiveness is inappropriate when no remorse has been expressed, and that such an attitude risks denying the existence of evil, while others were approving. Donald Kraybill and two other scholars of Amish life noted that "letting go of grudges" is a deeply rooted value in Amish culture, which remembers forgiving martyrs including Dirk Willems and Jesus himself. They explained that the Amish willingness to forgo vengeance does not undo the tragedy or pardon the wrong but rather constitutes a first step toward a future that is more hopeful.

== Schoolhouse demolition ==
The West Nickel Mines School was demolished the following week, on October 12, 2006. The site was left as a quiet pasture. The New Hope School was built at a different location, near the original site. It opened on April 2, 2007, precisely six months after the shooting. The new school was built intentionally as "different" as possible from the original, including the style of the flooring.

== Victims ==
=== Dead ===
- Naomi Rose Ebersol, 7, died at the scene October 2, 2006.
- Marian Stoltzfus Fisher, 13, died at the scene October 2, 2006.
- Anna Mae Stoltzfus, 12, was declared dead on arrival at Lancaster General Hospital in Lancaster, Pennsylvania, October 2, 2006.
- Lena Zook Miller, 7, died at Milton S. Hershey Medical Center in Hershey, Pennsylvania, October 3, 2006.
- Mary Liz Miller, 9, died at Christiana Hospital in Newark, Delaware, October 3, 2006.
- Rosanna King, 6, was removed from life support at Milton S. Hershey Medical Center and sent home at her family's request on October 4, 2006. She had serious brain injuries and was said to recognize family members and frequently smile, but never regained her ability to walk, talk, or feed herself. She succumbed to her injuries at the age of 23, on September 3, 2024, one month shy of the 18th anniversary of the massacre.

=== Injured ===
All of the surviving girls were hospitalized.

- Rachel Ann Stoltzfus, 8
- Barbara Fisher, 11
- Sarah Ann Stoltzfus, 12
- Esther King, 13

The girls wounded in the shooting made measurable progress in the year after the shooting. Sarah Ann Stoltzfus did not have full vision in her left eye but was back at school—she had not been expected to survive. Barbie Fisher was pitching in school softball but had undergone another shoulder operation to strengthen her right arm. Rachel Ann Stoltzfus returned to school in the months after the shooting. Esther King returned to school months after the shooting, graduating and working on the family farm.

== Fundraising ==
After the tragedy, several funds were established to assist the survivors. The Nickel Mines Children's Fund was established to aid the families of the children who had been shot, especially since the Amish did not have medical insurance to pay for medical care. By 2007, some $4.3 million was reported to have been donated to this fund. The Roberts Family Fund, also administered by the Amish, was established to provide money for Roberts's widow.

== In popular culture ==
=== Books ===
Several nonfiction books have been written about the shooting, including Amish Grace: How Forgiveness Transcended Tragedy by Donald Kraybill, Steven Nolt, and David L. Weaver-Zercher.

=== Movies ===
On March 28, 2010, the Lifetime Movie Network premiered a television movie about the Nickel Mines shooting, Amish Grace, based on the book Amish Grace: How Forgiveness Transcended Tragedy. It was the highest-rated movie on Lifetime Movie Network to that date.

The 2026 documentary Unexpected Peace opens with a segment on the incident and includes interviews with family members of the schoolchildren and with members of Roberts family. The documentary discuss the concepts of forgiveness, grace, and the principles of non-violence which informed the decisions of the members of the Amish community in Nickel Mines.

=== Theatre ===
The play The Amish Project by Jessica Dickey is a fictional account of the shooting told through monologues delivered by various people affected by the shooting, from both the Amish and outside community. It is planned to premiere on Broadway in 2027.

== See also ==
- List of school shootings in the United States by death toll
- List of shootings in Pennsylvania
- Platte Canyon High School hostage crisis – Hostage-taking and shooting in Bailey, Colorado
