= List of shootings in Pennsylvania =

This is a chronological list of shootings committed by firearms in the state of Pennsylvania. Each of the following has a Wikipedia article that contains the incident's details, such as: the shooting, the shooter, the victim, and/or a related subject.

Event	Location	Date	Number killed	Description
2025 North Codorus Township shooting	North Codorus Township	September 17, 2025	4	Five police officers were shot, three fatally, while serving a court order at a farm house.
2025 UPMC Memorial Hospital shooting	Shiloh	February 22, 2025	2	Husband of a recently deceased patient shot and injured six others before being fatally shot by police. A police officer was killed by friendly fire.
Attempted assassination of Donald Trump in Pennsylvania	Meridian	July 13, 2024	2	Thomas Crooks shot and killed an audience member and wounding 3 others at a re-election rally of presidential candidate Donald Trump. Crooks was killed by Secret Service members.
2022 Philadelphia shooting	Philadelphia	June 5, 2022	3	Shootout between two gunmen, which killed and injured multiple bystanders.
Pittsburgh synagogue shooting	Pittsburgh	October 27, 2018	11	Antisemitic attack. Perpetrator sentenced to death.
Melcoft shooting	Melcroft	January 28, 2018	5	Shooting targeting ex-partner and her social circle.
2017 Eaton Township Weis Markets shooting	Eaton Township	June 8, 2017	4	Workplace shooting at supermarket.
2016 Wilkinsburg shooting	Wilkinsburg	March 9, 2016	6	Two gunmen attacked a outdoors party targeting murder suspect and his social circle.
2014 Montgomery County shootings	Three towns in Montgomery County	December 15, 2014	7	A single gunman attacked his wife's family in several locations.
2014 Pennsylvania State Police barracks attack	Blooming Grove Township	September 12, 2014	1	Eric Frein attacked a Pennsylvania State Police barracks.
Ross Township Municipal Building shooting	Saylorsburg	August 5, 2013	3	Attack on town council over land dispute
2009 Collier Township shooting	Collier Township	August 4, 2009	4	Misogynist attack at women's gym
2009 shooting of Pittsburgh police officers	Pittsburgh	April 4, 2009	3	Man attacked policemen responding to a domestic violence call.
West Nickel Mines School shooting	Bart Township	October 2, 2006	7	Man attacked an Amish schoolhouse.
Lex Street massacre	Philadelphia	December 28, 2000	7	Three gunmen shot ten people inside a crackhouse over a car sales dispute
April 2000 Greater Pittsburgh shootings	Greater Pittsburgh	April 28, 2000	5	Racially-motivated spree shooting
2000 Wilkinsburg shooting	Wilkinsburg	March 1, 2000	3	Racially-motivated spree shooting
1998 Parker Middle School dance shooting	Edinboro	April 24, 1998	1	Teenaged shooter killed a teacher.
Murder of Mario Riccobene	Philadelphia	January 28, 1993	1	Mob hit of a turncoat.
1985 Springfield Mall shooting	Springfield	October 30, 1985	3	Woman killed two men and a toddler. Sentenced to life imprisonment.
Moser family murders	Evansburg	March 31, 1985	3	Single gunman kills his ex-wife and 2 daughters. The killer was executed.
1982 Wilkes-Barre shootings	Wilkes-Barre and Jenkins Township	September 25, 1982	13	Spree shooting targeting former girlfriends and their children
Murder of Charles DeVetsco	Harrisburg	October 13, 1980	1	Victim was kidnapped and killed. The killer was executed.
Babes in the Wood murders (Pine Grove Furnace)	Unclear	c. November 24, 1934	5	Two shot, three suffocated.
Kelayres massacre	Kelayres	November 5, 1934	5	A political parade was attacked by a Republican family.
Enoch Brown school massacre	Near present-day Greencastle	July 26, 1764	10	Native American attack. Both gunfire and tomahawks were used.
