= McKetta =

McKetta is a surname. Notable people with the surname include:

- Frank McKetta (1917–2006), American police chief
- John J. McKetta (1915–2019), American chemical engineer
