= Robert Evanchick =

American law enforcement officer (born 1957)

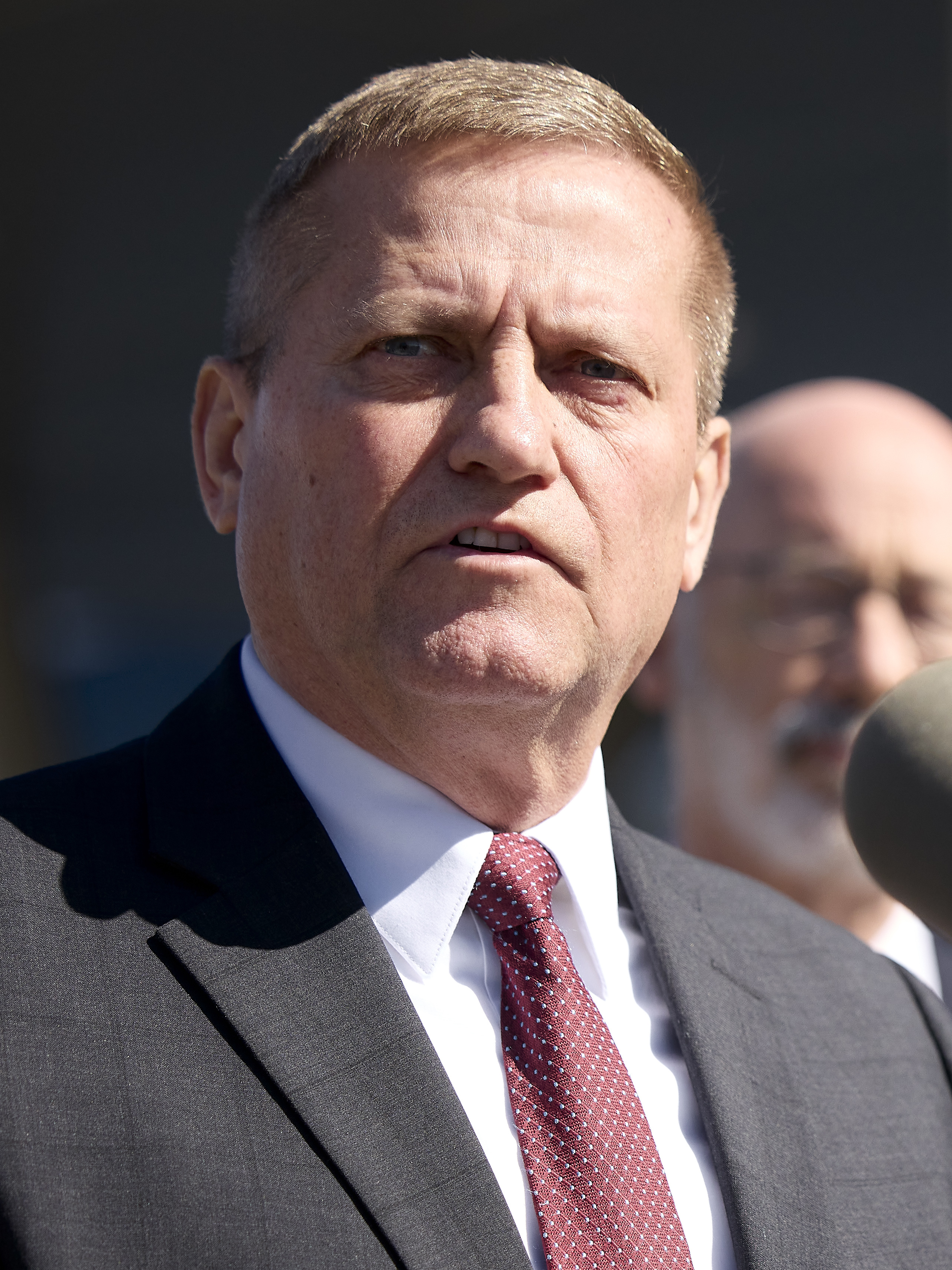
- Evanchick in 2022

22nd Commissioner of the Pennsylvania State Police
- In office Acting: March 24, 2018 – June 4, 2019; June 4, 2019 – January 19, 2023
- Governor: Tom Wolf
- Preceded by: Tyree Blocker
- Succeeded by: Christopher Paris

Personal details
- Born: July 21, 1957 (age 67); Wilkes-Barre, Pennsylvania, U.S.
- Profession: Law enforcement

Robert Evanchick (born 21 July 1957) is an American law enforcement officer and former Commissioner of the Pennsylvania State Police.

== Law enforcement career ==
=== Early career ===
A native of the Wilkes-Barre area, Evanchick was hired and served in the Wilkes Barre Police Department starting in 1979. He was a patrol officer for the department and after two years left for the state police.

=== Pennsylvania State Police ===
Evanchick joined the Pennsylvania State Police in 1981.

On June 4, 2019, Evanchick was confirmed by the Pennsylvania State Senate as the next Commissioner of the Pennsylvania State Police, he had previously served as the Acting Commissioner since March 24, 2018 when he was appointed by Pennsylvania Governor Tom Wolf.

== See also ==
- List of superintendents and commissioners of the Pennsylvania State Police
