= Saltlick Township, Pennsylvania =

Township in Pennsylvania, US

Coordinates: 40°03′00″N 79°22′59″W

Saltlick Township
- Township
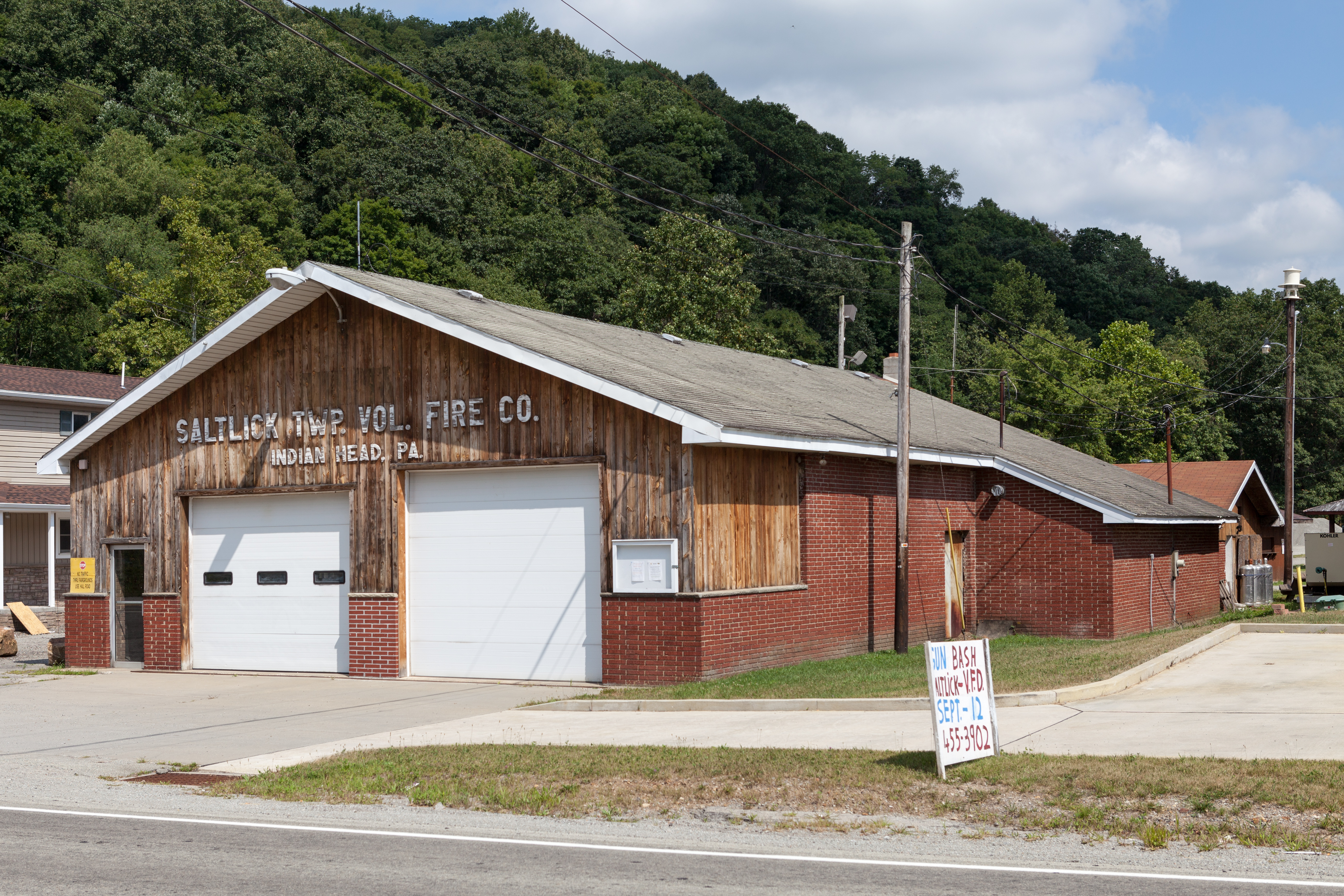
- Saltlick Township Volunteer Fire Company
- Etymology: "Salt lick"
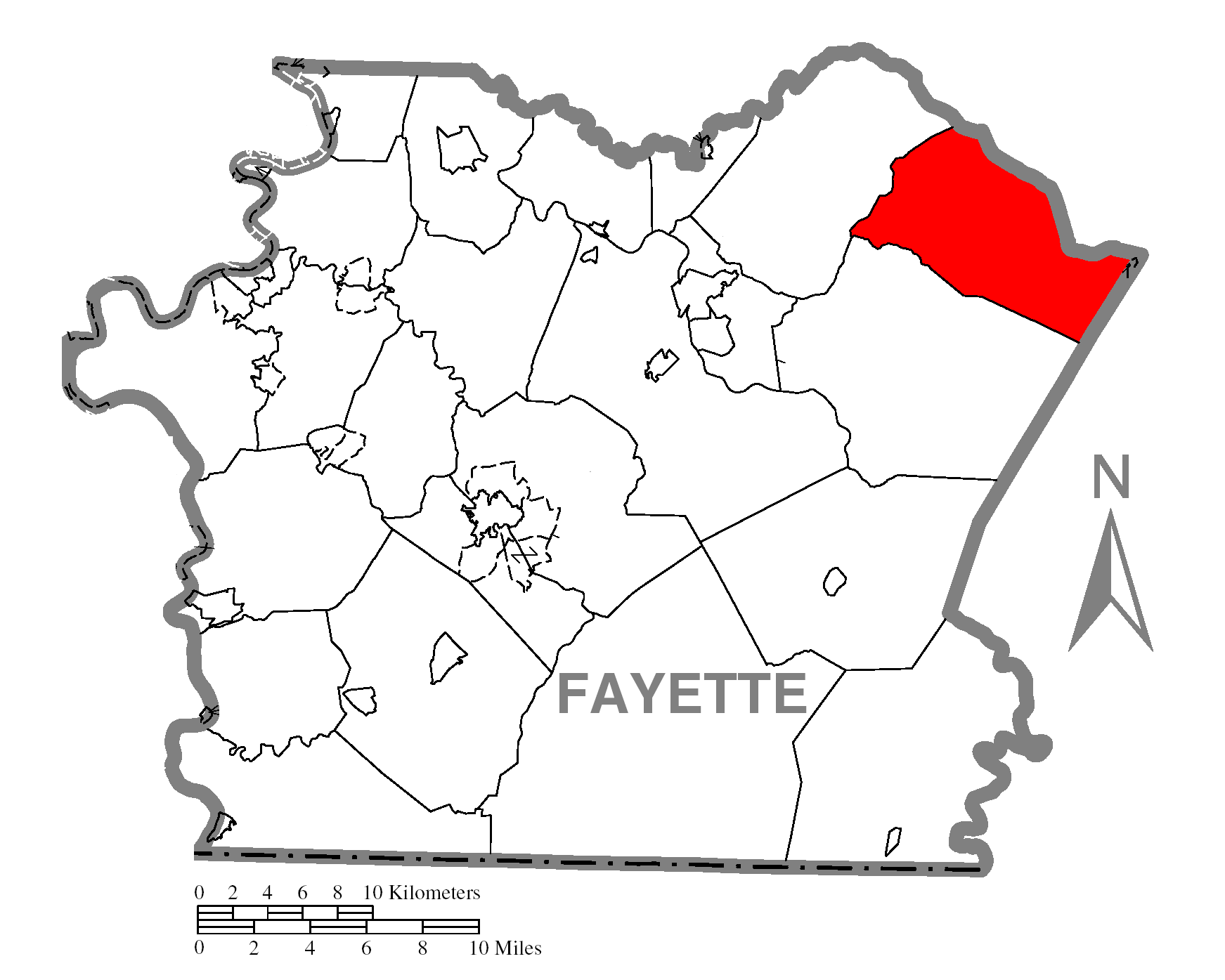
- Location of Saltick Township in Fayette County

- Location of Fayette County in Pennsylvania
- Country: United States
- State: Pennsylvania
- County: Fayette

Area
  - Total: 37.63 sq mi (97.47 km^{2})
  - Land: 37.63 sq mi (97.46 km^{2})
  - Water: 0.0039 sq mi (0.01 km^{2})

Population (2020)
  - Total: 3,042
- Time zone: UTC-4 (EST)
  - Summer (DST): UTC-5 (EDT)
- Area code: 724
- FIPS code: 42-051-67640
- Website: saltlicktownship.org

Saltlick Township is a township that is located in Fayette County, Pennsylvania, United States. The population was 3,042 according to the 2020 census, a decline of twelve percent from the 2010 census, and eighteen percent from the 2000 census. It is served by the Connellsville Area School District.

Indian Head, Millertown, Champion, Maple Grove, White, Clinton, and Melcroft are unincorporated communities in the township.

== History ==
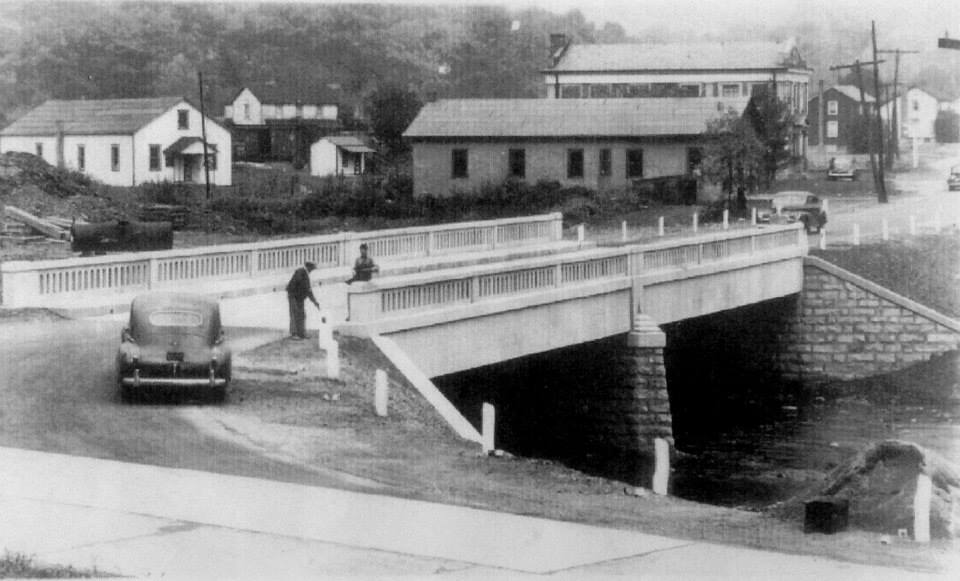
Route 711 and Indian Creek at the town of Indian Head, 1944

According to historian Franklin Ellis, the first settlers arrived in what is now Saltlick Township around the time of the American Revolution, with a few possibly arriving earlier. At that time, the area was heavily timbered.

The township was originally part of Bullskin Township until the two were separated, and Saltlick (or Salt Lick, as Ellis refers to it) Township created, in 1797. The name referred to numerous salt licks along Indian Creek.

== Geography ==
Saltlick Township occupies the northeastern corner of Fayette County, with Westmoreland County to the north and Somerset County to the east. Pennsylvania Routes 381 and 711 cross the center of the township, following the Indian Creek valley. The western side of the township sits on the crest of Chestnut Ridge, while the eastern side is on the parallel and higher Laurel Hill.

According to the United States Census Bureau, the township has a total area of 37.6 square miles (97.5 km^{2}), of which 0.004 square miles (0.01 km^{2}), or 0.01%, is water.

== Demographics ==
Historical population
| Census | Pop. | Note | %± |
|---|---|---|---|
| 2000 | 3,715 | | — |
| 2010 | 3,461 | | −6.8% |
| 2020 | 3,042 | | −12.1% |
| 2022 (est.) | 2,981 | | −2.0% |

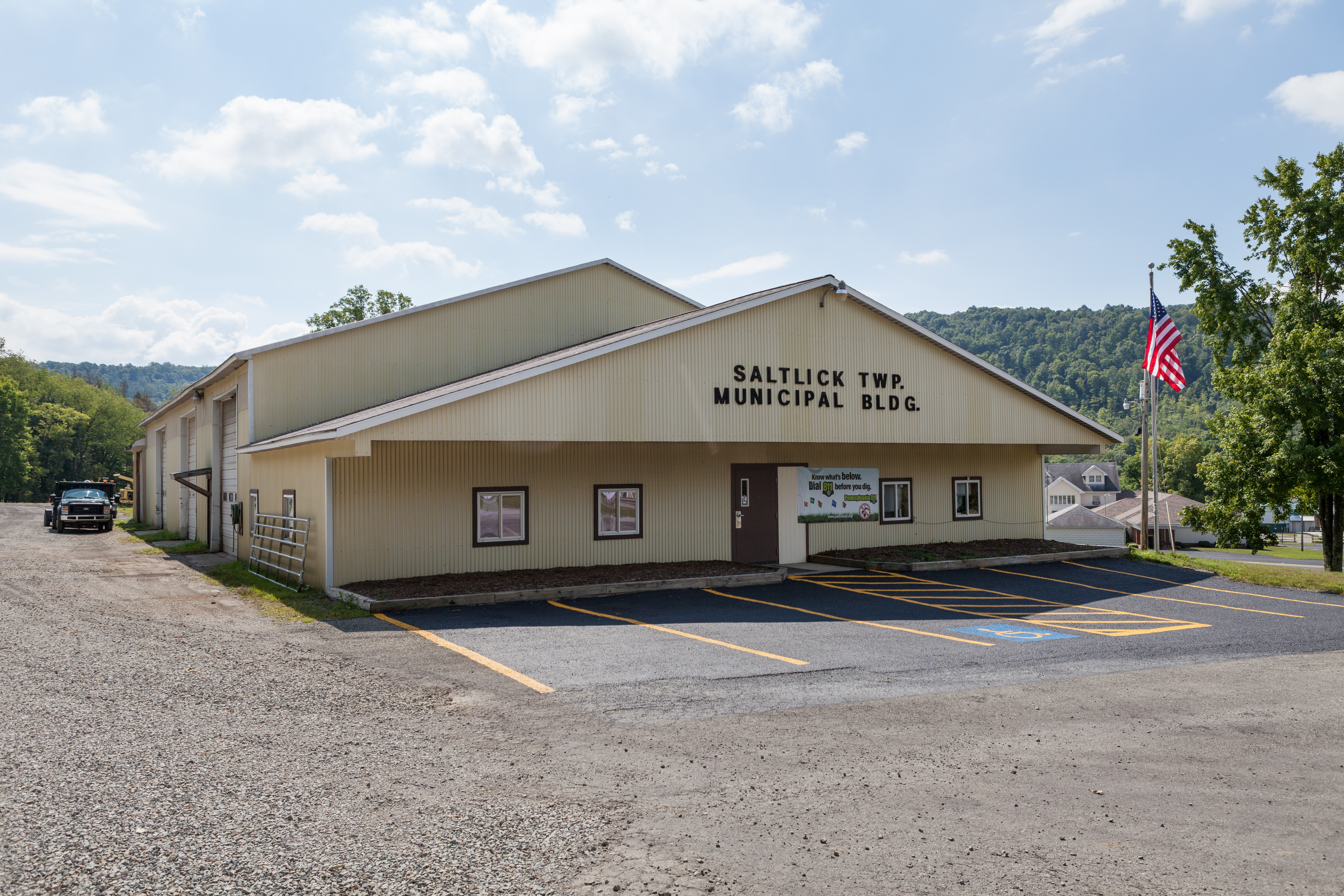
Saltlick Municipal Building

As of the decennial census of 2020, there were 3,037 people in the township, of which 97% were White, none were Black and 0.4 were Hispanic or Latino alone. There were 1,597 housing units, of which 79% were occupied.

In 2019, nearly two-thirds of the children in Saltlick Township were living in poverty, according to the Pittsburgh Post-Gazette.

== Industry ==
Agriculture was the major industry in the township's early days. Farmers mined coal on their own land for local use. The first industrial building was probably a mill, erected by Christian Perkey around 1780. The first store was probably that of Andrew Trapp, which may have been in operation as early as 1799. Over the next several decades, a number of sawmills and small distilleries were established.

Robindale Energy's Rustic Ridge No. 1 Mine extracts coal beneath Saltlick Township and neighboring Donegal Township under a five-year permit granted in 2016. The underground deep mine employed about 100 people as of January 2022. Attempts to extend the permit and expand operations in 2022 met with controversy.
