= 2014 Montgomery County shootings =

Familicide in Pennsylvania, U.S.

- Location: Montgomery County, Pennsylvania, U.S.
- Date: Shootings: December 15, 2014; 11 years ago 3:30 a.m. – 5:30 a.m. Manhunt: December 15–16, 2014; 5:30 a.m. – 1:30 p.m.
- Target: Ex-wife's family
- Attack type: Spree shooting, murder–suicide, familicide, stabbing, mass murder, mass shooting
- Weapons: .40-caliber Heckler & Koch handgun; 9mm Beretta handgun; Knife
- Deaths: 7 (including the perpetrator)
- Injuries: 1
- Perpetrator: Bradley William Stone
- Motive: Possible domestic dispute with ex-wife

The 2014 Montgomery County shootings were a killing spree that occurred in Montgomery County, Pennsylvania, United States, on December 15, 2014. The killings began at about 3:30 a.m. A woman was found dead in Lower Salford Township, two others were found dead in Lansdale, and three more were found in Souderton along with a wounded teenage boy. Police identified the suspected killer as 35-year-old Bradley William Stone of Pennsburg, Pennsylvania, and the victims were his ex-wife and her family members. Most of the victims were shot, although some were also stabbed with a knife. After an extensive manhunt, Stone was found dead on the day after the killings in the woods near his home. He reportedly committed suicide by overdosing on several drugs.

== Events ==
=== Killing spree ===
According to an affidavit filed by prosecutors, Stone was armed with two handguns (a .40-caliber Heckler & Koch and a 9mm Beretta) and at least one knife. The first killings occurred inside a home in Souderton at about 3:30 a.m. Stone attacked his former sister-in-law, her husband, and the couple's 14-year-old daughter and 17-year-old son. The couple and their daughter died, while the boy survived "significant cutting injuries" and blunt-force trauma to the head. He was eventually taken to the Thomas Jefferson University Hospital's trauma center in Philadelphia for treatment. The first crime scene was not discovered until nearly 8:00 a.m. Stone then went to a home in Lansdale, where he killed his former mother-in-law and grandmother-in-law at around 4:25 a.m.

At around 4:55 a.m., Stone then fatally shot his ex-wife in her apartment in Lower Salford Township. Neighbors of the ex-wife were awakened by shouting and several gunshots. They looked out their window to see Stone taking his two daughters to his car. When they asked if everything was okay, Stone replied, "She's hurt pretty bad, we've got to leave." Stone left with the children, and later dropped them off safely at the home of one of his neighbors in Pennsburg at around 5:30 a.m. The .40-caliber handgun was found at the Lower Salford crime scene.

=== Manhunt ===
In the afternoon of December 15, police descended on a home in Pennsburg where they believed Stone had barricaded himself; however, he was not there.

At around 8:00 p.m., Stone was reportedly sighted in Doylestown. Police were called to an attempted carjacking near the area of North Shady Retreat Road and Burpee Road. The alleged victim informed police that he was approached by a man in camouflage, who was armed with a knife and fit the general description of Stone. A struggle ensued between the two, and the victim, who had a concealed gun, fired shots at the carjacking suspect, who then fled into the woods. However, the sighting "did not appear to be valid", according to police. The manhunt was centered on the wooded area off Burpee Road in Doylestown.

Police conducted an "extensive search" in and around Pennsburg, aided by K-9 units and a Philadelphia Police Department helicopter with infrared technology, and advised people to remain indoors, keep their doors locked and call 911 if they thought they had seen the suspect. Schools in the area of the manhunt were closed on December 16. The shooter was described as having red hair and wearing brown or green military fatigues.

On the day after the killings, Stone was found dead in a wooded area located half a mile from his home in Pennsburg. According to Montgomery County District Attorney Risa Ferman, the cause of his death was "self-inflicted cutting wounds" to his midsection. However, this was denied by a preliminary autopsy conducted by the county coroner's office, which also verified that he did not fatally shoot himself. A machete and a "double-bladed black ax", both coated in blood, were found near his body along with several pill bottles. An autopsy by former Warren County Medical Examiner found a seven-centimeter stab wound to his upper thigh and three superficial cuts to the leg and hip area, authorities said. He also had ten scratches on his face and neck. The cause of death, following toxicology tests, was determined to be a drug overdose from a combination of trazodone, an antidepressant; mCPP, a metabolite of trazodone; and risperidone, used to treat schizophrenia. The death was ruled a suicide.

=== Victims ===
Six people were killed and one was seriously injured. The suspect's ex-wife, Nicole Hill, was reportedly the last fatality. Also killed were Hill's mother, Joanna Koder Hill, and grandmother Patricia Hill, as well as her sister Patricia Flick, brother-in-law Aaron Flick, and 14-year-old niece Nina Flick. Hill's 17-year-old nephew, Anthony Flick, was wounded at the same location where his family was killed. He was rushed to the hospital for treatment for stab wounds to the head and hand and also blunt-force trauma to the head that resulted in a gaping skull fracture. He was declared to be in "serious but stable condition". When Anthony woke up, he could talk, but he could not recall what had transpired. He was discharged from the hospital on December 22.

Officials released the causes of death for the slain victims. Patricia Flick was killed by gunshot wounds to her right forearm and face, also suffering from an incision wound to her head; Aaron Flick was killed by gunshot wounds to his right hand and head along with stab wounds to his arm and head; and Nina Flick died from twelve stab wounds to her head and an incision wound to the back of her neck. Patricia Hill was slashed in the left forearm and fatally shot in the head, near her right eye, while Joanne Hill died after being shot in the face and having her throat slashed. Nicole Hill suffered a gunshot wound to her hand and two fatal ones to the face.

== Perpetrator ==
Bradley William Stone, a 35-year-old resident of Pennsburg, Pennsylvania, was identified as the attacker. He was reported to be a military veteran who had been diagnosed with posttraumatic stress disorder, although there was no evidence to indicate a diagnosis.

Stone was enlisted in 2002 as a reservist in the United States Marine Corps, mainly as a meteorologist. He was assigned to the 3rd Battalion 14th Marines, a reserve artillery battalion in Philadelphia. Stone had one deployment to Iraq that started on April 17, 2008, and ended on July 2 of the same year. He left service sometime later that year, although he remained on individual ready reserve until 2011. Stone left with the rank of sergeant, according to a Marine spokesperson. Stone was reportedly being treated for unspecified combat-related physical injuries. On December 8, he met a psychiatrist at a Veterans Affairs medical center, and was found to have no suicidal or homicidal ideation. He had pleaded guilty in November 2013 to an April 28 vehicular crash caused by drunken driving. As part of his sentence, he was participating in a county rehabilitation program for veterans. Stone had previously had two other drunken-driving incidents, one that occurred in 2001 and the other in 2004.

Stone and Nicole Hill married in 2004 and filed for divorce in 2009. The two officially divorced in 2012. They had reportedly been clashing over custody of their two daughters and other matters for some time. On December 5, Stone filed an emergency petition, and Nicole responded with a counterclaim four days later, according to court records. Stone's efforts to gain custody of his daughters reportedly increased after Hill sought treatment for drug abuse. Hill allegedly told neighbors that she was afraid for her life and that she was sure Stone was going to kill her. Stone remarried in August 2013 and had recently fathered a child with his second wife. Prior to the killings, Stone legally purchased at least two handguns, including the .40-caliber Heckler & Koch and the 9mm Beretta used in the killings.

== Reactions ==
The U.S. Department of Veterans Affairs expressed "heartfelt condolences" to the victims of the killings. It also announced its intention to conduct a comprehensive review of the care Stone received from the Veterans Affairs medical centers.

== See also ==
- List of shootings in Pennsylvania
