= Tyree Blocker =

American law enforcement official

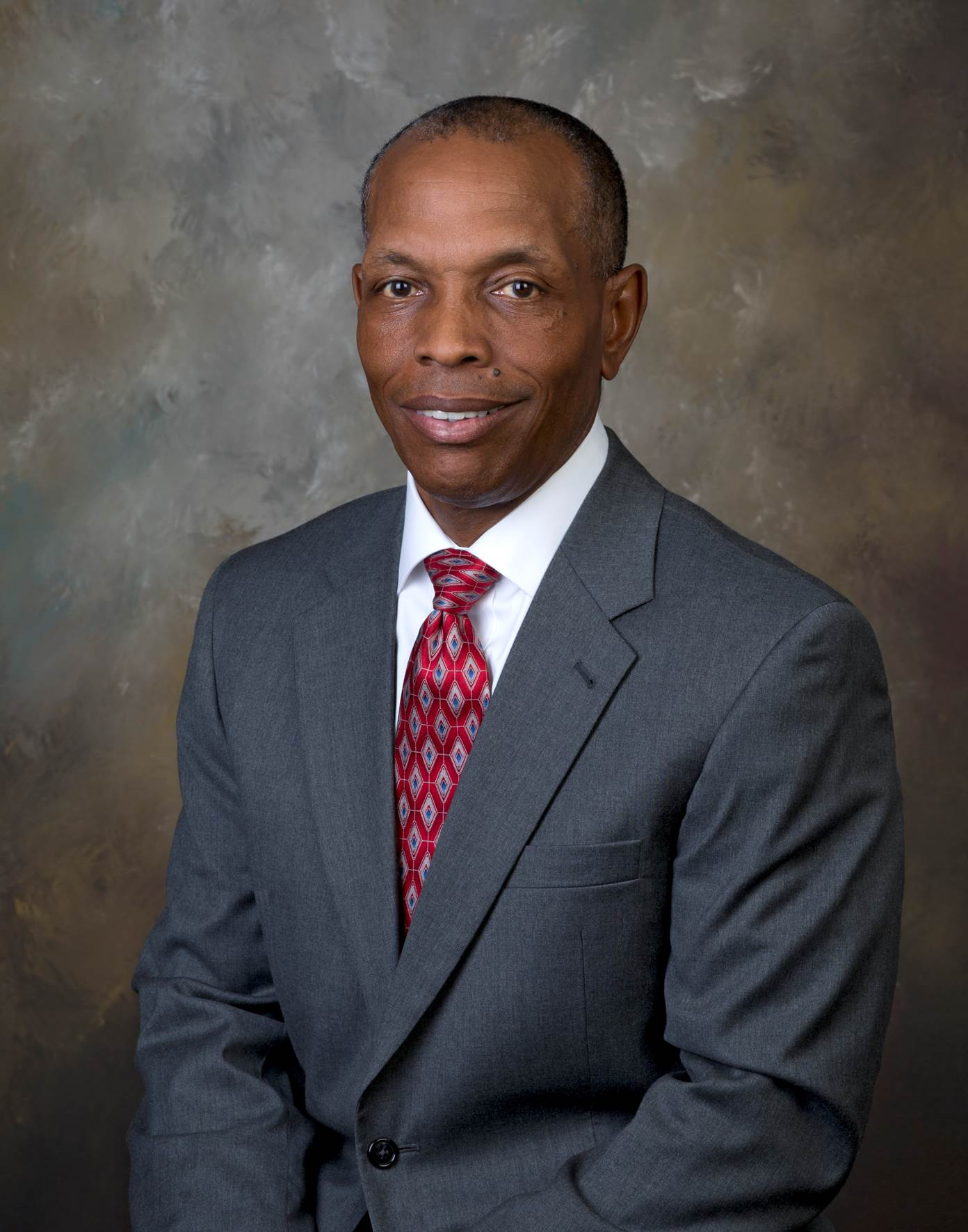
- Tyree Blocker in 2015

21st Commissioner of the Pennsylvania State Police
- In office 3 August 2015 – 23 March 2018
- Governor: Tom Wolf
- Preceded by: Frank Noonan
- Succeeded by: Robert Evanchick

Personal details
- Born: August 29, 1952 Philadelphia, Pennsylvania, U.S.
- Died: March 2, 2024 (aged 71) Pennsylvania, U.S.
- Spouse: Janice L. Blocker
- Children: 3
- Education: West Chester University
- Profession: Law enforcement

Tyree Cedric Blocker (August 29, 1952 – March 2, 2024) was a law enforcement official who rose in the ranks of the Pennsylvania State Police serving as commissioner from 2015 until his retirement in 2018.

Blocker began his career with the state police as a trooper in 1973 serving in troops F, L and J. In 1985 Blocker received his first promotion to Trooper first class while at troop L. In 1987 Blocker was again promoted to corporal and three years later to sergeant. In 1992 he was then promoted to lieutenant and a year later to captain. In 1996 he was promoted to major overseeing Section III (Delaware Valley area of Pennsylvania). In 2005 Blocker left the state police and was a senior adviser to the Trinidad and Tobago Police Service then later adviser to the minister of national security for the Trinidad and Tobago government. In 2014 Blocker returned to the United States.

In the summer of 2015 Blocker was nominated by governor Tom Wolf to oversee the state's police force. Blocker's nomination passed the Pennsylvania House of Representatives then the Pennsylvania State Senate and on August 3, 2015, Blocker was appointed as the 21st Commissioner of the Pennsylvania State Police.

== See also ==
- List of Pennsylvania State Police commissioners and superintendents
