= Frank Pawlowski =

19th Commissioner of the Pennsylvania State Police
- In office Acting: August 9, 2008 – October 7, 2008; October 7, 2008 – January 7, 2011
- Governor: Ed Rendell
- Preceded by: Jeffrey B. Miller
- Succeeded by: Frank Noonan

Personal details
- Education: West Chester University (BCJ)
- Profession: Law enforcement

Frank E. Pawlowski is a former police officer who served as commissioner for the Pennsylvania State Police.

== Early life ==
Frank E. Pawlowski was the son of a Pennsylvania State Police trooper.

In 1976, he graduated from West Chester State College with a bachelor's degree in criminal justice.

== Police career ==
In 1978, Pawlowski enlisted in the state police and was assigned to Troop J in Embreeville, Pennsylvania. Among other roles, he worked as a hostage negotiator, an investigator of the Camp Hill Prison riots, and a special counsel for state attorney general's probe into Pennsylvania Supreme Court Justice Rolf Larsen. In 1999, he graduated from the FBI National Academy. He became commander of Troop J in 2000 and was promoted to the rank of major in 2003.

On August 9, 2008, after state police commissioner Jeffrey B. Miller stepped down from his position to take a role with the National Football League, Governor Ed Rendell named Pawlowski as acting commissioner of the state police. Pawlowski was subsequently confirmed by the Pennsylvania State Senate on October 7, 2008. He continued to serve as the head of the state police, commanding approximately 6,000 civilian and enlisted employees, until he retired on January 7, 2011. He was succeeded by Frank Noonan, an appointee of newly elected governor Tom Corbett.

Pawlowski's older son, Francis J. Pawlowski, joined the Pennsylvania State Police in 2011.
