= Paul Evanko =

American police officer (1947–2024)

17th Commissioner of the Pennsylvania State Police
- In office February 15, 1995 – March 24, 2003
- Governor: Tom Ridge; Mark Schweiker
- Preceded by: Glenn A. Walp
- Succeeded by: Jeffrey B. Miller

Personal details
- Born: 1946 or 1947
- Died: July 2024 (aged 76–78); Danville, Pennsylvania, U.S.
- Education: Millersville University (BEd)
- Profession: Law enforcement

Paul J. Evanko (1946 or 1947 – July 6, 2024) was an American police officer who served as commissioner of the Pennsylvania State Police from February 1995 until March 2003. In that capacity, he was a member of the governor's cabinet under Tom Ridge and Mark Schweiker.

== Early life ==
Paul J. Evanko was born in Lancaster, Pennsylvania on October 20, 1947. His father, George J. Evanko, was an officer in the Pennsylvania State Police for 37 years.

In 1965, he graduated from Lancaster Catholic High School, and in 1969 he graduated from Millersville University with a bachelor's degree in education.

== Police career ==
Evanko was a founder and onetime president of the Pennsylvania Narcotic Officers' Association. During the 1990s, he was director of the State Police Bureau of Criminal Investigation in Harrisburg.

In February 1995, he was nominated for the position of commissioner for the state police.

Evanko retired as police commissioner in January 2003 and was succeeded by Jeffrey B. Miller.

== Later years ==
In 2004, a civil suit was begun against Evanko concerning his department's handling of sexual misconduct cases within the police force. The case related to the assaults committed by former state trooper Michael K. Evans against several women during the 1990s.

On December 14, 2007, Evanko was in a car crash. His blood-alcohol level was 0.183, which was more than double the legal limit, and he was charged with driving under the influence. While commissioner, Evanko had led campaigns against driving while drunk, and in 1999 had praised his agency for making a record number of DUI arrests the previous year.

Evanko died at Geisinger Medical Center in Danville, Pennsylvania on July 6, 2024, at the age of 76.

== Honours ==
In 1978, he received an award from the Drug Enforcement Administration for Outstanding Contributions in the Field of Drug Law Enforcement.
