= Frank Noonan =

Francis Noonan

20th Commissioner of the Pennsylvania State Police
- In office Acting: January 18, 2011 – April 12, 2011; April 12, 2011 – August 3, 2015
- Governor: Tom Corbett
- Preceded by: Frank Pawlowski
- Succeeded by: Tyree Blocker

Personal details
- Education: West Chester University in Pennsylvania
- Profession: Law enforcement
- Nickname: Frank

Military service
- Branch/service: United States Marine Corps
- Rank: Lance Corporal
- Battles/wars: Vietnam War

Francis (Frank) Noonan is an American former law enforcement officer who served as Commissioner of the Pennsylvania State Police. Noonan began his career in 1971 as an agent for the Federal Bureau of Investigation. Following his retirement from the FBI in 1998, Noonan was appointed as Northeast Regional Director for the Attorney General's Bureau of Narcotics Investigation. After 11 years as Regional Director, Noonan was promoted to Chief of Criminal Investigations for the Office of Attorney General in July 2009.

He is a graduate of West Chester University.

== Military career ==
Noonan served as an officer in the United States Marine Corps during the Vietnam War. He was awarded a Bronze Star for his service.

== Law enforcement career ==
=== Commissioner of the Pennsylvania State Police ===
Noonan was nominated by Governor Tom Corbett on January 18, 2011, to be Commissioner of Pennsylvania State Police and was confirmed by the Pennsylvania State Senate on April 12, 2011.

==== 2014 barracks attack ====
Noonan and the state police gained national attention after two troopers were shot outside a State Police barracks in Pike County in 2014. On September 14, two days after the attack, Noonan asked for additional personnel and assets from state police agencies in New York and New Jersey. By mid-day on the 15th, Noonan had been in touch with numerous federal police agencies and had been talking with high ranking officials within the United States Marshals Service and the Federal Bureau of Investigation.

Noonan continued his media appearing focusing on the suspect, his motive, the state police's response and information on the families involved to national and international media.

== Private career ==
Noonan was named to the board of directors of Pace-O-Matic, a gaming company, in 2022.

== Awards and honors ==
=== Military citations ===
- Bronze Star
- Combat Action Ribbon
- Navy Unit Commendation
- Vietnam Service Medal

=== Civilian/law enforcement awards ===
- PNOA Linda E. Richardson Commitment to Excellence Award
- Pennsylvania Narcotics Officer's Association Agent of the Year
