= Pennsylvania State Police =

Statewide law enforcement agency of Pennsylvania

- Patch of Pennsylvania State Police

- Wordmark of the Pennsylvania State Police
- Abbreviation: PSP

Agency overview
- Formed: May 2, 1905; 121 years ago
- Preceding agencies: Pennsylvania State Constabulary, Pennsylvania State Constables (1905–1937); State Highway Patrol (1923–1937); Pennsylvania Motor Police (1937–1943)

Jurisdictional structure
- Operations jurisdiction: Pennsylvania, U.S.
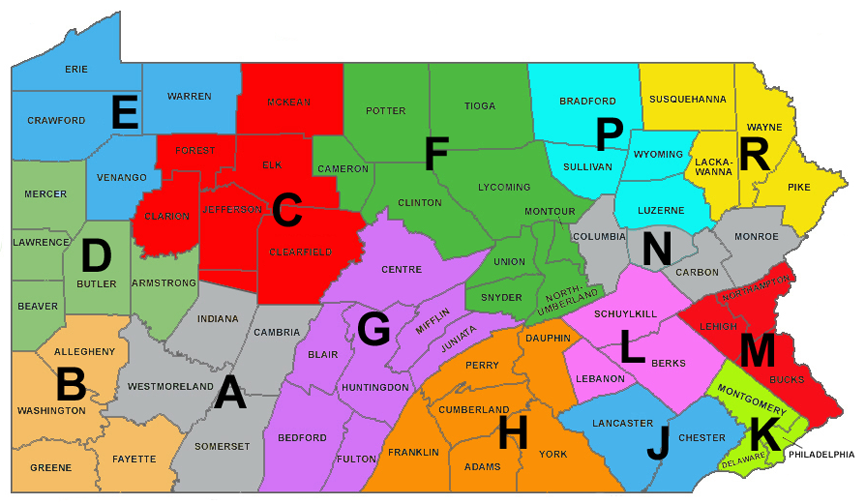
- Pennsylvania State Police Troops
- Area: 46,055 sq mi
- Population: 12,972,008 (2022)
- General nature: Civilian police

Operational structure
- Headquarters: Harrisburg, Pennsylvania
- Troopers: 4,841 (as of 2023)
- Civilian employees: 1,850 (as of 2015)
- Agency executive: Lieutenant Colonel George Bivens, Acting Commissioner
- Areas: 4
- Troops: 16

Facilities
- Stations: 90
- Airbases: 6
- Helicopters: 6 Bell 407GX
- Airplanes: 1 Cessna 208 High Wing, 1 Beechcraft King Air 360 Low Wing, 1 Pilatus PC-12 Low Wing

Website
- Pennsylvania State Police website

The Pennsylvania State Police (PSP) is the state police agency of the U.S. state of Pennsylvania, responsible for statewide law enforcement. The Pennsylvania State Police is a full service law enforcement agency which handles both traffic and criminal law enforcement. The Pennsylvania State Police was founded in 1905 by order of Governor Samuel Pennypacker, by signing Senate Bill 278 on May 2, 1905. The bill was signed in response to the Great Anthracite Strike of 1902. Leading up to the Anthracite Strike, private police forces (the coal and iron police) were used by mine and mill owners to stop worker strikes. The inability or refusal of local constables or sheriffs' offices to enforce the law directly influenced the signing of Bill 278. The Anthracite Strike lasted from May 15 to October 23, 1902, and was ended with the help of Theodore Roosevelt, the sitting president at the time.

PSP enlisted members are referred to as "Troopers". Up until 1963, married men were not allowed to apply to the state police, and active troopers had to seek permission from their superior officer to get married. As of 2021, the state police has approximately 4,547 State Troopers and more than 1,850 civilian support staff.

== Pennsylvania State Police Academy ==
In 1924, a State Police training academy was built in Hershey, Pennsylvania, on Cocoa Avenue. The site was located at the Hershey Inn and it remained at this location until 1960 when it was moved to 175 Hersheypark Drive, Hershey, Pennsylvania. The current location is fitted with kennels, stables and a range, among other facilities, and is located only a few miles from the original site. Once accepted into the Pennsylvania State Police Academy cadets endure a rigorous 28-week training period. Cadets live at the academy in barracks style quarters and are only permitted to go home on designated weekends. Cadets who fail to complete physical training in required times or who show any other type of deficiencies may be restricted from going home. While attending training, cadets are put on an 18-month probationary period and can be dismissed at any point in their training by the commissioner under any form of incompetence, inefficiency, or general violation of rules and regulations. The current drop-out rate for new recruits in the academy is approximately 20 percent per class.

== Operations ==
Under Pennsylvania law, a municipality may choose to have the state police act as its local law enforcement without incurring additional costs. Unlike other states, Pennsylvania does not use county sheriff's offices as full-service law enforcement agencies for the patrolling of areas not under the jurisdiction of local police departments, with the PSP covering these areas. As of 2016 1,287 municipalities in the state used the PSP as their only local law enforcement. The full PSP municipalities that have a population of 10,000 or below combined have about 17% of the total number of people in Pennsylvania; these municipalities make up about 50% of the total municipalities in the state. In 2019, about 66% of the municipalities in the state had PSP as the sole law enforcement or had a part-time police force combined with PSP. As of 2016 all areas in the following counties use PSP as their local law enforcement (either fully, or in conjunction with part-time local police departments): Cameron, Forest, Fulton, Juniata, Potter, Sullivan, Susquehanna, and Wyoming.

== Facilities ==
The PSP owns and operates various facilities to conduct law enforcement operations across the Commonwealth.

The following is the breakdown:

=== Barracks listing by county ===
County	Troop	Station
Adams	H	Gettysburg
Allegheny	B	Pittsburgh
Allegheny	T	Gibsonia
Allegheny	T	Jefferson Hills
Armstrong	D	Kittanning
Beaver	D	Beaver
Bedford	G	Bedford
Bedford	T	Everett
Berks	L	Reading
Berks	L	Hamburg
Blair	G	Hollidaysburg
Bradford	P	Towanda
Bucks	M	Trevose
Bucks	M	Dublin
Butler	D	Butler
Cambria	A	Ebensburg
Cameron	F	Emporium
Carbon	T	Pocono
Carbon	N	Lehighton
Centre	G	Rockview
Chester	J	Avondale
Chester	J	Embreeville
Clarion	C	Clarion
Clearfield	C	Clearfield
Clearfield	C	DuBois
Clinton	F	Lamar
Columbia	N	Bloomsburg
Crawford	E	Meadville
Cumberland	H	Carlisle
Cumberland	T	Newville
Dauphin	T	Highspire
Dauphin	H	Harrisburg
Dauphin	H	Lykens
Delaware	K	Media
Elk	C	Ridgway
Erie	E	Erie
Erie	E	Corry
Erie	E	Girard
Fayette	B	Uniontown
Forest	C	Marienville
Franklin	H	Chambersburg
Fulton	G	McConnellsburg
Greene	B	Waynesburg
Huntingdon	G	Huntingdon
Indiana	A	Indiana
Jefferson	C	Punxsutawney
Lackawanna	R	Dunmore
Lancaster	T	Bowmansville
Lancaster	J	Lancaster
Lawrence	D	New Castle
Lebanon	L	Jonestown
Lehigh	M	Fogelsville
Lehigh	M	Bethlehem
Luzerne	N	Hazleton
Luzerne	P	Shickshinny
Luzerne	P	Wyoming
Lycoming	F	Montoursville
McKean	C	Lewis Run
Mercer	D	Mercer
Mifflin	G	Lewistown
Monroe	N	Stroudsburg
Monroe	N	Fern Ridge
Montgomery	T	King of Prussia
Montgomery	K	Skippack
Northampton	M	Belfast
Northumberland	F	Stonington
Northumberland	F	Milton
Perry	H	Newport
Philadelphia	K	Philadelphia
Pike	R	Blooming Grove
Potter	F	Coudersport
Schuylkill	L	Schuylkill Haven
Schuylkill	L	Frackville
Snyder	F	Selinsgrove
Somerset	A	Somerset
Somerset	T	Somerset
Sullivan	P	Laporte
Susquehanna	R	Gibson
Tioga	F	Mansfield
Union	F	Milton
Venango	E	Franklin
Warren	E	Warren
Washington	B	Washington
Wayne	R	Honesdale
Westmoreland	A	Greensburg
Westmoreland	B	Belle Vernon
Westmoreland	T	New Stanton
Westmoreland	A	Kiski Valley
Wyoming	P	Tunkhannock
York	J	York

=== Bureaus and offices ===
The PSP also has many bureaus and subdivisions within the organization. This is by no means a complete list, merely a sampling of the breakdown.

- Bureau of Criminal Investigation
- Bureau of Emergency and Special Operations
- Bureau of Forensic Services
- Bureau of Human Resources
- Bureau of Liquor Control Enforcement
- Bureau of Records and Identification
- Bureau of Patrol
- Bureau of Integrity and Professional Standards
- Bureau of Communications and Information Services
- Bureau of Staff Services
- Bureau of Research & Development
- Bureau of Training & Education
- Bureau of Gaming Enforcement
- Commonwealth Law Enforcement Assistance Network – C.L.E.A.N.
- Equal Employment Opportunity Office
- Public Information Office
- Recruitment and Special Services Office
- Member Assistance Office
- Department Discipline Office
- Municipal Police Officers' Education and Training Commission (MPOETC)
- Domestic Security Office
- Bureau of Pregnancies & Domestic Affairs

=== Units ===
- Academy Instructors
- Collision Analysis and Reconstruction Specialists
- Auto Theft Units
- Aviation
- Ballistics Section
- Ceremonial Unit
- Clandestine Lab Units
- Commercial Vehicle Enforcement
- Community Service Officer
- Computer Crimes
- Criminal Interdiction (S.H.I.E.L.D)
- Criminal Investigation Units
- Drug Recognition Experts
- Explosives/Bomb Section
- Fire Marshals
- Firearms Instructors
- Forensic Services Unit
- Fugitive Units
- Gaming Enforcement
- Intelligence Units
- Interdiction Units
- K-9 Units
- Marine Unit
- Megan's Law Unit
- Motorcycle Units
- Mounted Units
- Negotiators
- Organized Crime
- PA Crime Stoppers
- PA Criminal Intelligence Center
- PA Instant Check System
- Polygraph Unit
- Public Information Officers
- Recruiting Unit
- Special Emergency Response Teams (SERT), which is the PA State Police's version of S.W.A.T
- State Police Crime Laboratories
- Uniform Patrol Units
- Unsolved Crimes
- Vehicle Fraud Investigation
- Vice/Narcotics

== Uniform and rank structure ==
The uniform worn by PSP troopers is unique within Pennsylvania. In January 1988, the State Police changed the color of its uniforms. PSP troopers wore dark grey uniforms that confused them with some municipal police departments and Pennsylvania State Constables. By state law, no municipal (city, borough, or township) police department can wear the same exact uniform or color configuration as that of the PSP.

=== Uniform – troopers to sergeants ===
The current PSP uniform for troopers, corporals, and sergeants consists of a light gray uniform shirt with black shoulder epaulets. The PSP shoulder patch is worn on both sleeves of all uniform items. The PSP members are issued long sleeve shirts for the winter and short sleeve shirts for summer. However, PSP requires the black necktie to be worn year round. The uniform shirt consist of the trooper's nameplate over the right pocket and any awards the trooper has earned over the left pocket. The PSP is one of only five state police forces that do not wear a badge on their uniform shirts. The original PSP uniform was modeled after the Constabulary forces in Europe and they did not have badges. It is history and tradition for troopers today to carry their badges in a wallet along with their photo ID card. The uniform trousers are a darker gray color with a one-inch-wide black stripe on the leg. PSP shoes and/or boots are also black in color.

The PSP duty belt is plain black leather. The duty holster is the level-2 model. The ammo pouch and handcuff case have hidden snap closure. The OC pepper spray and ASP baton holders are open top. The duty belt is held together with the trousers belt using four silver snap belt keepers. In 2025, PSP started using external vests on their long sleeves uniforms. These do not carry any equipment and mimic the front and back of the shirt. The chest portion of the shirt is modified to be breathable. These are in trial in Troop T.

The PSP trademark item is the campaign-style hat with the chin strap worn in the front under the chin on the winter campaign hat (as opposed to most agencies that wear the strap of the campaign hat behind the head). The hat contains a blackened commonwealth coat of arms. It is required to be worn whenever the trooper is outdoors. It is made of dark gray felt (for wintertime wear) or light gray straw (for summertime wear). The strap of the summer hat is worn behind the head.

The Class "A" Ceremonial uniform troopers wear is a "full dress" uniform with a charcoal gray military-style blouse coat with black buttons. It is worn with the standard issue trouser pants and a black dress shoes. The rank insignia is worn on the shoulder epaulets of the blouse coat. Medals, insignias and ribbons are to be worn on the blouse coat. This uniform is modeled after the original PSP history uniform.

Service insignia's are permitted to be worn on the left sleeve of the Class "A" Ceremonial uniform to correspond with the troopers years of service. A gold bar symbolizes 5 years of service and a gold star symbolizes 10 years of service. The symbols can be combined on the sleeve to signify additional years of service.

=== Uniform – Commissioned Officers (lieutenants to colonel) ===
The uniforms for PSP Lieutenants, Captains, Majors, Lieutenant Colonels, and the Colonel are identical to that of the lower ranks, except for the following:

- A gold-colored commonwealth coat of arms on the left collar and the officer's rank on the right collar.
- Black stripes on trousers has a gold stripe within it of increasing width with higher rank.
- The campaign hat is replaced with a military officer's style service cap with a gold-colored commonwealth seal. Captains and above have the distinctive "scrambled eggs" on the visor. Alternatively, officers may wear the campaign hat with a gold coat of arms with the duty uniform.

In addition to the minor detail changes, officers also wear the Class "A" Ceremonial uniform. Officers Class "A" Ceremonial uniform includes a "full dress" uniform with a charcoal gray military-style blouse coat with gold buttons and gold stitching on the sleeves. It is worn with the standard issue trouser pants which include a gold stripe and black dress shoes. The rank insignia is worn on the shoulder epaulets of the blouse coat. Medals, insignias and ribbons are to be worn on the blouse coat.

Service insignia's are permitted to be worn on the left sleeve of the Class "A" Ceremonial uniform to correspond with the troopers years of service. A gold bar symbolizes 5 years of service and a gold star symbolizes 10 years of service. The symbols can be combined on the sleeve to signify additional years of service.

=== Ranks, insignia, and descriptions, etc. ===
Title	Insignia	Rank Information	Uniform Information
Commissioner (Colonel)		The Commissioner of the Pennsylvania State Police holds the rank of Colonel. The Commissioner is the commander of the agency.	Gold stripe down sides of trousers. Rank insignia worn on right collar, with Pennsylvania coat-of-arms insignia worn on left collar. Formal peaked cap contains gold chin strap, and gold 'scrambled eggs' on brim.
Deputy Commissioner (Lieutenant Colonel)		The Deputy Commissioner of the Pennsylvania State Police holds the rank of Lieutenant Colonel. The Deputy Commissioner is the second-in-command of the agency.	Gold stripe down sides of trousers. Rank insignia worn on right collar, with Pennsylvania coat-of-arms insignia worn on left collar. Formal peaked cap contains gold chin strap, and gold 'scrambled eggs' on brim.
Major		Majors are in charge of an Area (such as Area III), which encompasses several Troops.	Gold stripe down sides of trousers. Rank insignia worn on right collar, with Pennsylvania coat-of-arms insignia worn on left collar. Formal peaked cap contains gold chin strap, and gold 'scrambled eggs' on brim.
Captain		Captains are in charge of a Troop (such as Troop B, located in Area III), which encompasses several Stations.	Black stripe inlaid with gold down sides of trousers. Rank insignia worn on right collar, with Pennsylvania coat-of-arms insignia worn on left collar. Formal peaked cap contains gold chin strap, and gold 'scrambled eggs' on brim.
Lieutenant		Lieutenants are in charge of a Station (such as Station 1, located in Troop B, Area III).	Black stripe inlaid with gold down sides of trousers. Rank insignia worn on right collar, with Pennsylvania coat-of-arms insignia worn on left collar. Formal peaked cap contains gold chin strap.
Sergeant		Sergeants are Station Commanders and the supervisor of a unit, section, or specialty position.	Black stripe down sides of trousers. Rank insignia worn on sleeves.
Corporal		Corporals supervise Troopers and oversee the patrol's daily calls for service.	Black stripe down sides of trousers. Rank insignia worn on sleeves.
Master Trooper	Silver Device under Nameplate	This is a longevity promotion for Troopers who have completed 22 years of service or who do not wish to become supervisors.	Black stripe down sides of trousers.
Trooper First Class		This is a longevity promotion for Troopers who have completed 12 years of service.	Black stripe down sides of trousers. Rank insignia worn on sleeves.
Trooper	No Insignia	Upon graduation from the Pennsylvania State Police Academy, cadets are promoted to the rank of Trooper.	Black stripe down sides of trousers.
State Police Cadet	No Insignia	A State Police Cadet is a Commonwealth employee who is enrolled in but has not yet graduated from the Pennsylvania State Police Academy.	

== Vehicles ==
The department currently operates a mixed fleet of vehicles including the new law enforcement specific Ford Explorer, Dodge Durango, Dodge Charger and Chevrolet Tahoe. They also use Harley-Davidson Motorcycles for highway patrol. The PSP also owns and operates numerous special operations vehicles including the Lenco BearCat and the Ring Power Rook. Their aviation wing operates helicopters and fixed-wing aircraft. PSP operates watercraft mainly on the Delaware River and Lake Erie.

  

== Aviation ==
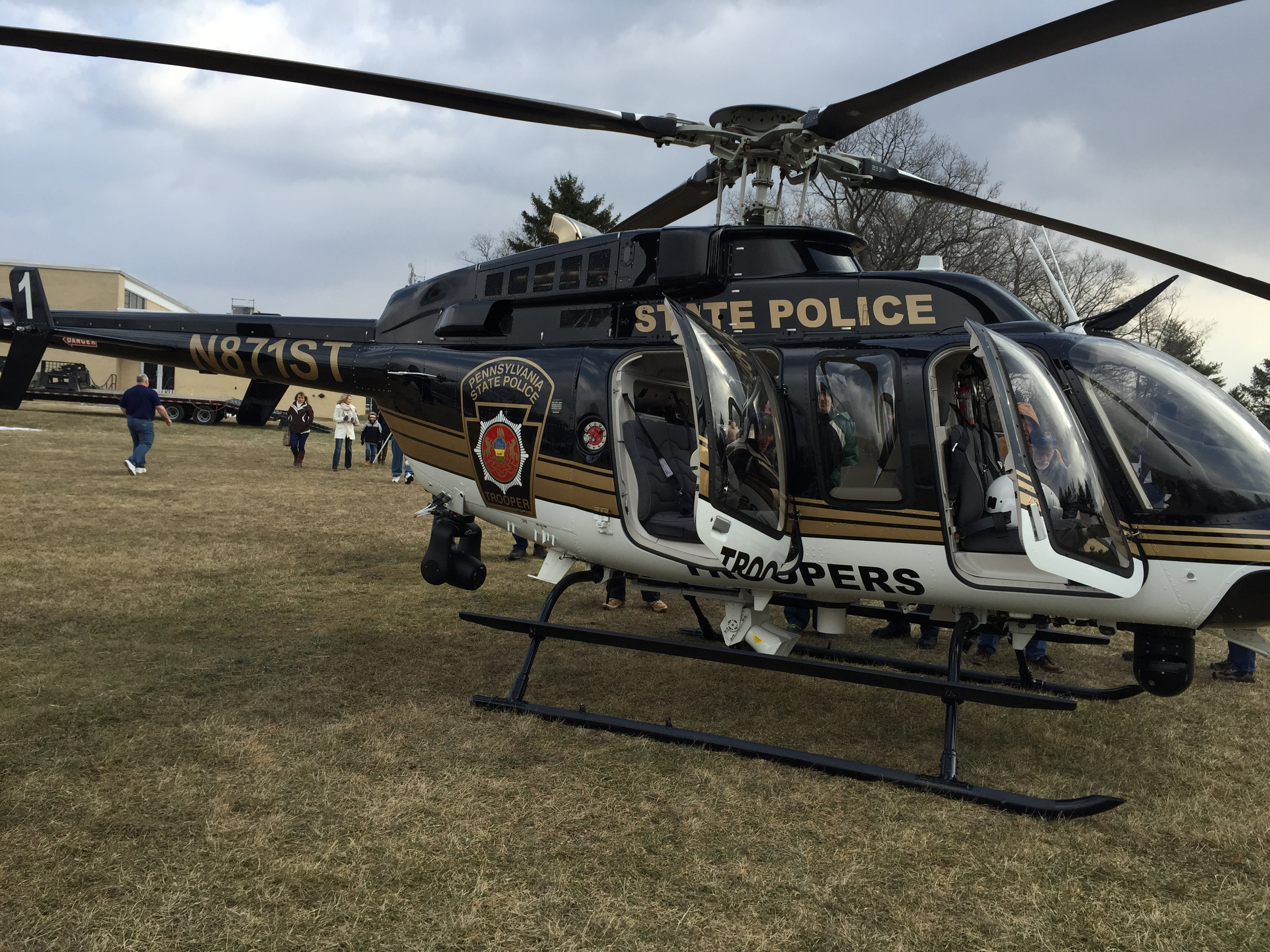
Pennsylvania State Police Helicopter

The PSP Aviation Section consists of thirty-five trooper pilots and three full-time mechanics, using six law enforcement specific Bell 407GX helicopters, 1 PC-12/47E, 1 Cessna 208B, and 1 Beechcraft Super King Air 360ER. These aircraft are stationed in six aviation patrol units (APU).

== Weapons ==
The Pennsylvania State Police utilizes the Walther PDP (Service Pistol) which is a 9×19mm Parabellum semi-automatic pistol designed in 2021 by Walther Arms as a replacement for the Walther PPQ. The Walther PDP is also mounted with an Aimpoint Acro P-2 red dot reflex sight.

Other firearms include the Colt AR-15 (including the LE6920 and LE6940), and gas grenade launchers.

The current less-lethal weapons the PSP is utilizing consist of electroshock weapon technology, pepper spray (OC), and expandable ASP straight batons.

== Accreditation ==
The Pennsylvania State Police is the largest internationally accredited law enforcement agency in the world. This distinction was awarded to the Pennsylvania State Police on July 31, 1993, by the Commission on Accreditation for Law Enforcement Agencies (CALEA), an independent, non-profit organization based in Fairfax, Virginia.

Accreditation is a process used by professional law enforcement agencies to facilitate the creation, verification and maintenance of high-quality policies and procedures, via voluntary compliance with performance standards. CALEA's 446 standards address nine major law enforcement topics: role, responsibilities, and relationships with other agencies; organization, management, and administration; personnel structure; personnel process; operations; operational support; traffic operations; prisoner and court-related services; and auxiliary and technical services.

== Members killed in the line of duty ==
Key
shaded rows with "SHP" in the Notes cell denotes the officer was a member of the Pennsylvania State Highway Patrol.

Name	Rank	Badge Number	Tenure	End of Watch	Age	Cause of Death	Notes
John F. Henry	Private	—	8 months	September 2, 1906	31	Gunfire	
Francis A. Zehringer	Private	—	8 months	September 2, 1906	34	Gunfire	
Timothy Kelleher	Private	—	1 year, 8 months	September 14, 1907	29	Stabbed	
Mark A. Prynn	Sergeant	—	3 years, 2 months	February 9, 1909	29	Gunfire (Accidental)	
John Garscia	Private	—	3 years, 3 months	February 21, 1909	35	Gunfire (Accidental)	
John L. Williams	Private	—	2 years	August 22, 1909	29	Gunfire	
John C. "Jack" Smith	Private	—	7 months	August 23, 1909	24	Gunfire	
Robert V. Myers	Private	—	1 year, 1 month	March 28, 1913	22	Gunfire (Accidental)	
Andrew W. Czap	Private	—	8 months	April 28, 1918	24	Gunfire	
John F. Dargus	Private	—	8 months	May 31, 1918	21	Gunfire	
Chester A. Kuhns	Private	—	2 years	October 6, 1918	29	Spanish Influenza	
Joseph B. Malloy	Private	—	2 years	October 9, 1918	24	Spanish Influenza	
Zoe A. Remaly	Sergeant	—	9 years	October 15, 1918	35	Spanish Influenza	
George E. Higgins	Private	—	3 months	October 20, 1918	26	Spanish Influenza	
Joseph R. Brown	Private	—	1 year, 6 months	October 22, 1918	29	Spanish Influenza	
Edward C. Jackson	Private	—	2 years	October 23, 1918	27	Spanish Influenza	
John P. McLaughlin	Private	—	1 years, 5 months	October 24, 1918	34	Spanish Influenza	
James A. Walsh	Private	—	—	December 15, 1918	25	Spanish Influenza	
Stanley W. Christ	Private	—	1 month	December 1, 1919	22	Animal related	
Benjamin F. McEvoy	Corporal	—	13 years, 3 months	September 21, 1923	40	Struck by vehicle	
William J. Omlor	Private	—	4 years, 4 months	October 25, 1923	29	Motorcycle accident	
Francis L. Haley	Private	2551	5 months	October 14, 1924	25	Gunfire	
Edwin F. Haas	Sergeant	—	14 years	October 17, 1924	35	Gunfire (Accidental)	
Bernard S. C. McElroy	Private	—	1 year, 11 months	December 21, 1924	25	Motorcycle accident	
Bertram Beech	Private	—	1 year, 7 months	December 10, 1925	28	Struck by train	
Claude F. Keesey	Private	—	1 year, 4 months	January 4, 1927	23	Automobile accident	
Martin A. Hanahoe	Patrolman	—	1 year, 1 month	February 27, 1927	24	Vehicular assault	SHP
Thomas E. Lipka	Private	—	1 year, 8 months	April 3, 1927	25	Automobile accident	
John M. Thomas	Sergeant	—	1 month	May 8, 1927	43	Automobile accident	
John J. Downey	Private	2853	3 years, 2 months	August 22, 1927	31	Gunfire	
Vincent A. Hassen	Corporal	—	1 year	December 27, 1927	24	Motorcycle accident	SHP
Sharon C. Wible	Patrolman	—	6 months	February 6, 1928	22	Motorcycle accident	SHP
Andrew W. Miller	Patrolman	—	7 months	April 1, 1928	21	Motorcycle accident	SHP
James F. "Jay" Proof	Patrolman	—	1 year, 6 months	August 29, 1928	30	Vehicle pursuit	SHP
Russell T. Swanson	Patrolman	—	1 year, 6 months	April 19, 1929	22	Gunfire	SHP
Wells C. Hammond	Patrolman	—	10 months	October 14, 1929	24	Motorcycle accident	SHP
Brady C. Paul	Corporal	—	3 years, 11 months	December 27, 1929	26	Gunfire	SHP
Thomas E. Lawry	Corporal	—	3 years, 4 months	January 31, 1930	24	Vehicular assault	SHP
Arthur A. Koppenhaver	Patrolman	—	1 year	July 13, 1930	22	Motorcycle accident	SHP
Charles L. Stewart	Private	—	1 year, 1 month	July 18, 1930	22	Gunfire	
Thomas B. Elder	Patrolman	—	2 years	March 22, 1931	28	Vehicular assault	SHP
Timothy G. McCarthy	Sergeant	—	11 years, 8 months	May 12, 1931	42	Gunfire	
Orville A. Mohring	Patrolman	—	2 years, 6 months	December 11, 1931	24	Vehicular assault	SHP
Joseph A. Conrad	Patrolman	—	1 year, 11 months	September 6, 1932	26	Motorcycle accident	SHP
Charles E. Householder	Patrolman	—	5 years, 3 months	August 20, 1933	27	Vehicular assault	SHP
Herbert P. Brantlinger	Patrolman	—	1 year, 8 months	September 3, 1933	27	Gunfire	SHP
James A. Seerey	First Sergeant	1760	14 years, 7 months	September 10, 1934	42	Animal related	
Floyd W. Maderia	Private	—	4 years, 7 months	December 11, 1934	34	Automobile accident	
Joseph L. Fulton	Corporal	—	7 years, 8 months	June 4, 1936	32	Motorcycle accident	SHP
Joe B. Champion	Sergeant	—	11 years, 9 months	July 15, 1936	36	Automobile accident	SHP
J. Lee Clarke	Patrolman	—	3 years, 1 month	March 1, 1937	32	Motorcycle accident	SHP
John E. Fessler	Private	—	4 years, 1 month	April 23, 1937	32	Gunfire	
Joseph A. Hoffer	Private	—	7 years, 7 months	April 27, 1937	29	Gunfire	
John J. Broski	Private	1385	19 years, 7 months	August 14, 1937	40	Gunfire	
John D. Simoson	Patrolman	—	1 year, 7 months	December 1, 1937	23	Motorcycle accident	
Joseph M. Williams	Private	—	6 months	October 8, 1938	26	Struck by vehicle	
Charles H. Craven	Private	—	8 years	October 11, 1938	32	Struck by vehicle	
George D. Naughton	Corporal	—	12 years, 2 months	January 30, 1939	40	Gunfire	
Frederick J. Sutton	Private	—	2 years, 4 months	January 3, 1940	26	Gunfire	
George J. Yashur	Private	—	3 years, 2 months	April 1, 1940	24	Struck by vehicle	
Thomas P. Carey	Private	—	6 years, 1 month	June 17, 1941	31	Exposure to toxins	
Dean N. Zeigler	Private	—	1 year	October 17, 1942	24	Automobile accident	
John A. Ditkosky	Private	—	3 years, 2 months	July 24, 1950	27	Automobile accident	
Floyd B. Clouse	Private	—	7 years, 3 months	November 2, 1953	29	Gunfire	
Joseph F. McMillen	Private	—	3 years, 11 months	May 13, 1956	26	Automobile accident	
Philip C. Melley	Trooper	—	19 years, 11 months	November 3, 1957	41	Gunfire	
Charles S. Stanski	Trooper	—	4 years	January 17, 1958	29	Vehicle pursuit	
Edward Mackiw	Trooper	—	8 years, 7 months	May 31, 1958	32	Struck by vehicle	
Stephen R. Gyurke	Trooper	606	3 years, 10 months	August 24, 1958	29	Struck by vehicle	
Francis M. Tessitore	Trooper	—	6 years, 10 months	August 5, 1960	28	Struck by vehicle	
Anthony Bensch	Trooper	—	20 years	October 3, 1961	43	Automobile accident	
Edward W. Gundel	Sergeant	—	24 years, 6 months	March 18, 1962	45	Gunfire	
Richard G. Barnhart	Trooper	—	12 years, 8 months	August 8, 1964	37	Vehicle pursuit	
Gary R. Rosenberger	Trooper	—	1 year, 6 months	December 12, 1970	26	Gunfire	
John S. Valent	Corporal	1003	25 years, 10 months	December 9, 1971	49	Gunfire	
Robert D. Lapp Jr.	Trooper	—	8 years, 1 month	October 16, 1972	30	Gunfire	
Bruce C. Rankin	Trooper	—	2 years, 2 months	April 25, 1973	25	Automobile accident	
Ross E. Snowden	Trooper	—	3 years, 9 months	January 17, 1974	33	Aircraft accident	
Leo M. Koscelnick	Corporal	—	7 years, 3 months	August 15, 1977	33	Vehicular assault	
Joseph J. Welsch	Trooper	—	4 years, 7 months	September 13, 1977	26	Gunfire	
Wayne C. Ebert	Trooper	—	27 years, 9 months	June 7, 1978	50	Struck by vehicle	
Albert J. Izzo	Trooper	—	7 years, 11 months	June 13, 1979	35	Gunfire	
David D. Monahan	Trooper	—	8 years, 11 months	April 17, 1980	38	Vehicular assault	
Herbert A. Wirfel	Trooper	—	20 years, 5 months	February 7, 1982	45	Automobile accident	
William R. Evans	Trooper	—	16 years, 3 months	January 6, 1983	44	Vehicle pursuit	
Frank J. Bowen	Trooper	—	2 years, 10 months	October 26, 1983	27	Automobile accident	
Gary W. Fisher	Trooper	—	4 years, 1 month	February 3, 1985	26	Gunfire	
John J. Brown	Trooper	1290	14 years, 7 months	February 14, 1985	37	Struck by vehicle	
Roark H. Ross	Trooper	4099	13 years, 3 months	May 15, 1986	35	Automobile accident	
Clinton W. Crawford	Trooper	—	6 years, 6 months	August 17, 1987	30	Struck by vehicle	
John A. Andrulewicz	Trooper	—	23 years, 7 months	May 9, 1988	45	Automobile accident	
Paul I. Almer	Corporal	—	14 years, 1 month	April 12, 1989	39	Aircraft accident	
Wayne D. Bilheimer	Trooper	—	21 years, 3 months	April 12, 1989	44	Aircraft accident	
Arthur L. Hershey	Sergeant	—	27 years, 8 months	January 3, 1999	51	Struck by vehicle	
Matthew R. Bond	Trooper	—	4 years, 3 months	January 14, 2000	28	Automobile accident	
Tod C. Kelly	Trooper	—	16 years, 4 months	November 7, 2001	43	Struck by vehicle	
Joseph J. Sepp Jr.	Trooper	6672	10 years, 8 months	November 10, 2002	34	Gunfire	
Brian A. Patterson	Trooper	7273	9 years, 4 months	February 14, 2003	36	Electrocuted	
Joseph R. Pokorny Jr.	Corporal	4648	22 years, 5 months	December 12, 2005	45	Gunfire	
Joshua D. Miller	Trooper	8819	10 years, 9 months	June 7, 2009	34	Gunfire	
Paul G. Richey	Trooper	7201	16 years, 7 months	January 13, 2010	40	Gunfire	
Blake T. Coble	Trooper First Class	5504	24 years, 9 months	October 4, 2012	47	Automobile accident	
Bryon K. Dickson, II	Corporal	10714	7 years, 3 months	September 12, 2014	38	Gunfire (terrorist attack)	
David Kedra	Trooper	12115	2 years, 3 months	September 30, 2014	26	Gunfire (Accidental)	
Landon E. Weaver	Trooper	13093	1 year, 16 days	December 30, 2016	23	Gunfire	
Michael P. Stewart, III	Trooper	12494	3 years, 6 months	July 14, 2017	26	Automobile accident	
Donald C. Brackett	Trooper First Class	—	17 years, 9 months	May 18, 2019	58	Training related	
Monty R. Mitchell	Trooper First Class	10816	13 years, 3 months	February 8, 2021	45	Heart attack	
Dung X. Martinez	Trooper First Class	8533	20 years, 7 months	October 21, 2021	57	COVID-19 exposure	
Branden T. Sisca	Trooper	14430	1 year, 1 month	March 21, 2022	29	Struck by vehicle	
Martin F. Mack, III	Trooper	12764	7 years, 4 months	March 21, 2022	33	Struck by vehicle	
Jacques F. Rougeau Jr.	Trooper	14376	2 years, 11 months	June 17, 2023	29	Gunfire	
Timothy J. O'Connor Jr.	Corporal	11189	15 years, 5 months	March 8, 2026	40	Gunfire	
Michael E. Pahira Jr.	Trooper	10642	19 years, 6 months	July 1, 2026	44	Struck by vehicle	

== Superintendents and commissioners since 1905 ==
The following is a chronological listings of commissioners of the Pennsylvania State Police:

Superintendents of the Pennsylvania State Police (Note: Known as "Superintendent of The Pennsylvania State Police" until June 29, 1937 when it was renamed "Commissioner of The Pennsylvania Motor Police" following the merger of the state police and highway patrol.)
No.	Name	Term in Office	Notes
1	Col. John C. Groome	July 1, 1905 – February 28, 1920 (Note: Retired.)	First state police superintendent, appointed by Governor Pennypacker
–	Cpt. George F. Lumb	June 3, 1919 (Note: It is unknown for how long they served in the acting capacity.)	Served as acting superintendent briefly
2	Major Lynn G. Adams	March 1, 1920 – February 28, 1937	Adams created the Bureau of Criminal Identification and Information (BCI&I) and named Captain Wilson C. Price to serve as the bureau's first chief.
-	Office vacant	February 28, 1937 – June 29, 1937	Office remained vacant for four months following the retirement of Adams
Superintendents of the Pennsylvania State Highway Patrol (Note: On May 18, 1923 the Pennsylvania State Highway Patrol was established. It would later by merged with the Pennsylvania State Police.)
1	Cpt. Wilson C. Price	May 18, 1923 – April 13, 1936	Pinchot]]
–	Deputy Supt. (Note: On August 25, 1922, Adams bestowed upon the Deputy Superintendent the rank of Major; (This was the initial use of that rank in the Department's history)) Philip J. Dorr	February 29, 1936	Served as acting superintendent briefly
–	Lt. Earl J. Henry	March 16, 1936	Served as acting superintendent briefly
2	Cpt. Charles H. Quarles	April 13, 1936 – February 28, 1937 (Note: Resigned.)	Resigned in protest of the merging of the two departments
–	Lt. Earl J. Henry	February 28, 1937 – June 29, 1937	Served as acting superintendent following the resignation of Quarles
Commissioners of the Pennsylvania Motor Police (Note: Following the merger of the state police and highway patrol on June 29, 1937, the position of superintendent was combined and renamed "Commissioner of the Pennsylvania Motor Police".)
1	Col. (Note: Following the merger of the two departments, the new commissioner appointed himself "Colonel", and the deputy commissioner as "Lieutenant Colonel".) Percy W. Foote	June 29, 1937 – January 25, 1939	First motor police commissioner, appointed by Governor Earle
–	Lt. Col. Cecil M. Wilhelm	January 25, 1939 – May 31, 1939	Served as acting commissioner following the retirement of Foote
2	Col. Lynn G. Adams	May 31, 1939 – January 20, 1943	In 1939, Col. Adams moved the horses which were stabled at 20th and Herr Street to the Hershey Training School
3	Col. Cecil M. Wilhelm	January 20, 1943 – June 1, 1943 (Note: Continued service under the renamed department.)	Following the department's renaming in 1943, Wilhelm became the first state police commissioner
Commissioners of the Pennsylvania State Police (Note: On April 28, 1943, Act 52 renamed the department to the Pennsylvania State Police, and as a result the commissioner became known as the "Commissioner of the Pennsylvania State Police".)
4	Col. Cecil M. Wilhelm	June 1, 1943 – March 28, 1955	First state police commissioner, appointed by Governor Martin
5	Col. Earl J. Henry	March 28, 1955 – February 26, 1959	Henry abolished the use of the "squadron" label in favor of "district" and changed the title of "squadron commander" to "district inspector"
6	Col. Frank G. McCartney	February 26, 1959 – January 29, 1963	McCartney changed the name from "Pennsylvania State Police Training School" to "Pennsylvania State Police Academy"
7	Col. E. Wilson Purdy	January 29, 1963 – April 8, 1966	In 1963, Purdy introduced a five-day work week for the first time in State Police History. Purdy also for the first time in State Police history allowed married men to apply for cadet training
–	Lt. Col. Paul A. Rittelmann	April 8, 1966 – January 17, 1967	Served as acting commissioner following the retirement of Purdy
8	Col. Frank McKetta	January 17, 1967 – January 25, 1971	Appointed by Governor Shafer, previously led the Federal Protective Service
9	Col. Rocco P. Urella	January 25, 1971 – January 2, 1973	Permitted the enlistment of female troopers in 1971
10	Col. James D. Barger	January 2, 1973 – February 15, 1977	Began construction of the new state police headquarters
11	Col. Paul J. Chylak	February 15, 1977 – March 1, 1979	Chylak initiated the State Police Aerial Reconnaissance and Enforcement, also known as (S.P.A.RE.)
12	Daniel F. Dunn (Note: Dunn held no paramilitary rank and did not wear a uniform while serving as Commissioner.)	March 1, 1979 – May 16, 1984 (Note: Died in office.)	In June 1980, Dunn made the .357 Ruger, a stainless steel, four inch barrel revolver, the new standard sidearm
–	Lt. Col. Cyril J. Laffey	May 16, 1984 – December 1, 1984	Served as acting commissioner following the death of Dunn
–	Lt. Col. Nicholas Dellarciprete	December 1, 1984 – March 6, 1985	Served as acting commissioner following the resignation of Laffey
13	Col. Jay Cochran Jr.	March 6, 1985 – January 30, 1987	Under Cochran's leadership, the agency developed new uniforms, a new shoulder patch, and multiple offices were renamed
14	Col. John K. Schafer	January 30, 1987 – August 3, 1987	Schafer served as commissioner for only a brief period due to an unfortunate illness which resulted in his death in August 1987
15	Col. Ronald M. Sharpe	August 3, 1987 – April 23, 1991	First African American to hold the position of commissioner, appointed by Governor Casey
16	Col. Glenn A. Walp	April 23, 1991 – January 17, 1995	Under the leadership of Walp, on July 31, 1993, the Pennsylvania State Police became the largest accredited police agency in the world. The department had to comply with 773 professional police standards
–	Maj. James B. Hazen	January 17, 1995 – February 15, 1995	Served as acting commissioner following the retirement of Walp
17	Col. Paul J. Evanko	February 15, 1995 – March 24, 2003	Appointed by Governors Ridge and Schweiker
18	Col. Jeffrey B. Miller	March 24, 2003 – August 8, 2008	Promoted from Major, appointed by Governor Rendell
–	Lt. Col. Frank E. Pawlowski	August 9, 2008 – October 7, 2008 (Note: Confirmed by the senate.)	Served as acting commissioner following the resignation of Miller. Confirmed as Commissioner by the senate on October 7, 2008
19	Col. Frank E. Pawlowski	October 7, 2008 – January 7, 2011	Promoted from Lieutenant Colonel, appointed by Governor Rendell
–	Francis Noonan	January 18, 2011 – April 12, 2011	Served as acting commissioner following the retirement of Pawlowski. Confirmed as Commissioner by the senate on April 12, 2011
20	Col. Francis Noonan	April 12, 2011 – August 3, 2015	Former FBI Agent, appointed by Governor Corbett
–	Col. Marcus Brown	August 3, 2015 – December 9, 2015 (Note: Brown failed to be confirmed by the state senate and after a brief standoff between the senate and the newly-elected governor, Tom Wolf, his nomination was revoked and Wolf instead nominated Tyree Blocker for commissioner. During this time, Brown stayed on as acting commissioner.)	Failed to be confirmed by the senate, appointed by Governor Wolf
21	Col. Tyree C. Blocker	December 9, 2015 – March 23, 2018	Former PSP Major, appointed by Governor Wolf
–	Lt. Col. Robert Evanchick	March 24, 2018 – June 4, 2019	Served as acting commissioner following the retirement of Blocker. Confirmed as Commissioner by the senate on June 4, 2019
22	Col. Robert Evanchick	June 4, 2019 – January 19, 2023	Former Deputy Commissioner of Operations, appointed by Governor Wolf
–	Maj. Christopher L. Paris	January 19, 2023 – March 9, 2023	Served as acting commissioner following the retirement of Evanchick. Confirmed as Commissioner by the senate on March 9, 2023
23	Col. Christopher L. Paris	March 9, 2023 – December 31, 2025 (Note: Paris was confirmed as Commissioner by the senate on March 9, 2023. He stepped down early on January 2, 2026.)	Former PSP Major, appointed by Governor Shapiro
-	Lt. Col. George L. Bivens	December 31, 2025- present	Serving as acting commissioner following the retirement of Paris.

== Traditions ==
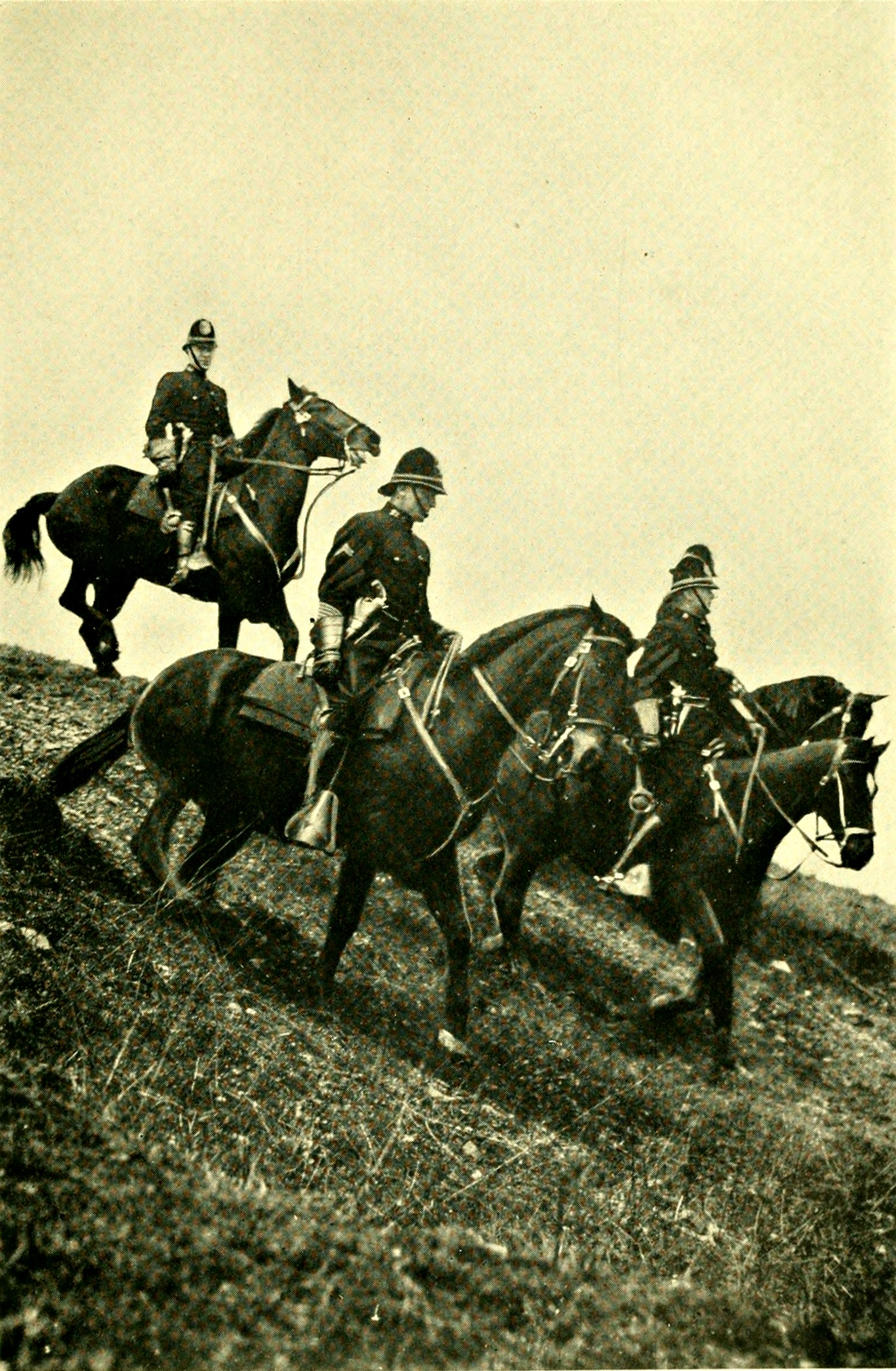
Pennsylvania Constabulary 1905

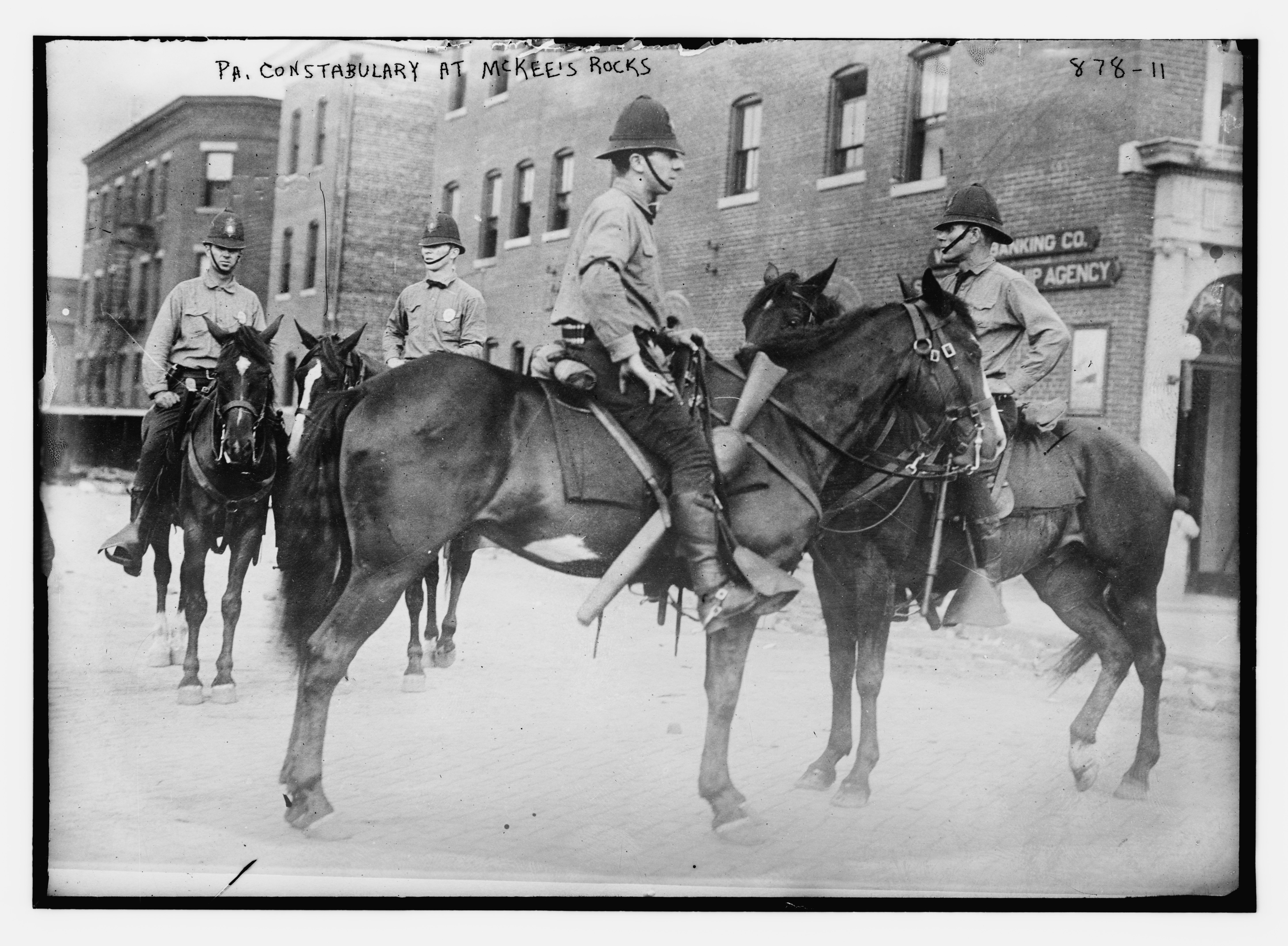
Pennsylvania Constabulary at McKee's Rock 1909

- PSP Troopers are widely recognized for wearing the strap of their winter campaign hats under their chins, a tradition that goes back to the early 1900s, which was based on British and Irish Bobbies.
- The PSP is one of only a handful of state police agencies that do not wear badges on their uniforms.
- The PSP was nationally recognized as the premiere state police agency in the early years of the 20th century. State troopers from North Carolina and Kentucky attended the training academy so they could start PSP-style state agencies in their respective states. NC trooper cadets at the academy in Raleigh and KY trooper cadets in Frankfort are frequently reminded they have a familial connection to the PSP through their training process history.
- The PSP was patterned after a military organization and PSP troopers have sometimes been referred to as "Soldiers of the Law and Order". Divisions of the force are called "troops", and officers are known as "troopers", a title usually reserved for members of the United States Cavalry, and reminiscent of the early beginnings of the department when officers patrolled on horseback. Regional headquarters, at which single troopers were once required to live, are referred to as "barracks". The original concept was that the troopers did not apply to join the PSP but "enlisted" for two-year periods, after which they could be honorably discharged or apply for reenlistment. The longstanding two-year enlistment periods were phased out in 1961.
- Married men were initially barred from becoming state troopers. After 1927, troopers were allowed to marry after they had completed their first two-year enlistment if they had approval from the police superintendent. The PSP allowed married men to enlist in 1963.
- PSP does not allow ride-alongs. Even state police cadets cannot "ride along" prior to graduating the academy. This is done for numerous safety and liability reasons.

== Misconduct and controversy ==
2000

Trooper Michael Evans pleaded guilty in October 2000 to sexual crimes committed against six women and teenage girls while on duty. He was sentenced to between five and ten years in custody.

2007

In September, 2007, Trooper Kevin Foley was arrested for the murder of a dentist, Dr. John Yelenic, in Blairsville, Pennsylvania.

2008

In July, 2008, Trooper Kevin Coleman was charged with protecting a prostitution ring based out of the Gables Truck Stop in Harrisburg, Pennsylvania.

2009

In May 2009, Trooper Shawn Dillard was found guilty by a federal court of using his position to protect an interstate prostitution ring based out of the Gables Truck Stop in Harrisburg, Pennsylvania. This was the same investigation that led to the arrest of Trooper Coleman.

2011

In early 2011, as a result of a lawsuit brought by the American Civil Liberties Union, the state police agreed to stop issuing tickets to people who swear. Press reports indicated the state police had issued as many as 700 such citations a year.

2012

In January 2012, Lieutenant Barry Eugene Staub, the commander of the state police barracks in York was arrested for driving while drunk. He retired when charges were brought against him.

2014

In March, 2014 Trooper Barry M Searfoss Jr. pleaded guilty to killing a woman while driving drunk in 2012. He was sentenced to between six and 23 months' confinement.

2017

Trooper Ryan Luckenbaugh was sentenced by Judge Scott A. Evans to 9 to 22 months in county prison on his official oppression, simple assault and harassment convictions. Luckenbaugh kicked a handcuffed man in the face while the man sat on the sidewalk and lied about it on official reports.

2021

Trooper Robert E. Covington Jr., of Olyphant, PA, for his alleged involvement in illegal activity occurring at Sinners Swing Gentlemen's Club in Mayfield Borough, Lackawanna County. Covington, 48, is a 13-year veteran of PSP and was assigned to the Bureau of Gaming Enforcement, Pocono Downs Wilkes-Barre Office. He had been on restricted duty during the investigation and is currently suspended without pay pending resolution of the charges against him.

Multiple Troopers Facing Charges

2022

Trooper Joshua Ravel from the York barracks was charged with DUI while on duty after he showed up for his shift and drove from York to Lancaster and back for a special assignment. He was taken to the supervisors office where he appeared under the influence, and a chemical breath test revealed his blood alcohol content to be .144. A review of the dash camera footage from his cruiser showed he was unable to maintain his lane of travel several times during the drive.

Trooper Joshua Burney from the Lewis Run barracks in McKean county was charged with DUI while on duty after a colleague noticed he smelled of alcohol and had red, glossed over eyes. Trooper Burney was taken back to the barracks where preliminary field sobriety tests and a breath test showed signs of impairment. A blood draw test showed his blood alcohol content to be .086. A review of the dash camera footage from his cruiser showed he was unable to maintain his lane of travel several times during his response to an emergency call in Mount Jewett Borough.

Both troopers were suspended without pay pending to outcome of their cases. Trooper Burney was the second trooper to be charged with DUI on duty within 4 months along with Trooper Ravel. Both were on the job for the PA State Police for less than 2 years. Trooper Ravel graduated from the academy in June 2020, and Trooper Burney graduated August 2021.

2023

Trooper Michael J. Brown stationed at the Mansfield barracks was charged with vehicular homicide. An investigation into a crash indicated he attempted to pass a vehicle illegally across the double yellow lines on U.S. Route 6 in Sullivan Township in February. As a result, Brown's vehicle, a Jeep Grand Cherokee, struck an oncoming GMC Acadia, killing the driver, 47-year-old Christine Woodward.

Pa. trooper involved in crash that killed Troy teacher charged with vehicular homicide

== In popular culture ==
- H. Beam Piper's 1965 science fiction novel Lord Kalvan of Otherwhen's eponymous character begins the story as a PSP Trooper.
- An undercover PSP Trooper played by Sarah Jessica Parker co-stars with Bruce Willis playing a Pittsburgh Police River Rescue Squad officer in the 1993 movie Striking Distance.
- A PSP Trooper is played by Harland Williams in the 1994 film Dumb and Dumber.
- The PSP were featured in the sixth-season CSI: NY episode "Redemptio" as well as the ninth-season Law & Order episode titled "Hate".
- The PSP is featured in the 2004 TV film Boa vs. Python.
- Featured in the 1997 movie For Richer or Poorer.
- Stephen King's novel From a Buick 8 features Troop D in a fictional town named Statler.
- The PSP were featured in the 2010 movie Unstoppable, in which a runaway train passes through numerous townships within the state of Pennsylvania.
- Multiple PSP troopers and the department were featured in the Netflix series Evil Genius, which covered the murder of Brian Wells and the bank heist surrounding it.
- PSP Criminal Investigators were featured in the first-season episode of TV series Cold Case Files, titled "Little Girl Lost".
- PSP featured extensively, including fairly accurate depictions of uniforms and vehicles, in the film Angel Has Fallen.
- A PSP trooper played by Alison Oliver is a member of an FBI taskforce in Task.

== See also ==
- List of law enforcement agencies in Pennsylvania
- List of Pennsylvania state agencies
- State Police of Crawford and Erie Counties, a separate volunteer organization predating the PA State Police
- Pennsylvania Capitol Police
- Highway patrol
- State patrol
- State police
