= Christopher Paris =

Pennsylvania State Police commissioner

27th Commissioner of the Pennsylvania State Police
- In office March 9, 2023 – January 2, 2026; Acting: January 19, 2023 – March 9, 2023
- Governor: Josh Shapiro
- Preceded by: Robert Evanchick

Personal details
- Born: Dunmore, Pennsylvania, U.S.
- Education: University of Scranton; Temple University Beasley School of Law (JD)
- Profession: Law enforcement

Christopher L. Paris is an American law enforcement officer and former Commissioner of the Pennsylvania State Police. He was the 23rd state police commissioner and the 27th individual to lead the force. He retired from the State Police to join the Federal Bureau of Investigation on January 2, 2026.

== Early life and education ==
=== Early life ===
Christopher L. Paris was born in the Dunmore, Pennsylvania, area. He attended and graduated from Scranton Preparatory School located in Scranton, Pennsylvania in 1994.

=== Education ===
After graduating from preparatory school, Paris attended the University of Scranton where he graduated magna cum laude in 1998.

Paris earned his Doctor of Jurisprudence from the Temple University Beasley School of Law in 2004, and in 2005 he passed the Pennsylvania Bar Exam, of which he is an active member. Paris has also passed the New Jersey Bar Exam.

Paris is a graduate of the 267th session of the Federal Bureau of Investigation National Academy, graduating on March 17, 2017.

== Law enforcement career ==
=== Early career ===
A native of the Dunmore area Paris, enlisted into the state police in 1999 where he started as a Trooper assigned to Troop K, Skippack and Philadelphia. As Paris progressed through the ranks, he also served in the Bureau of Training and Education, the Department Discipline Office, Troop R Dunmore and Blooming Grove, and Department Headquarters.

=== Pennsylvania State Police ===
After enlisting in the Pennsylvania State Police in 1999, Paris would serve as a Trooper assigned to Troop K, Skippack and Philadelphia.

Throughout his career in the department, he has served in the roles of Station and Troop Commander, Area III Commander, and Deputy Commissioner of Administration and Professional Responsibility.

On March 9, 2023, Paris was confirmed by the Pennsylvania State Senate as the next Commissioner of the Pennsylvania State Police, he had previously been serving as the Acting Commissioner since January 19, 2023 when he was appointed by Pennsylvania Governor Josh Shapiro.

Paris was Commissioner of the Pennsylvania State Police during the attempted assassination of former President Donald Trump. On July 23rd, he testified before Congress regarding the state police actions during the event.

=== Dates of promotion ===
- Paris began his career in the state police as a Trooper in 1999.
- In 2005, he was promoted to Corporal
- In 2006, he was promoted to Sergeant
- In 2010, he was promoted to Lieutenant
- In 2015, he was promoted to Captain
- In 2018, he was promoted to Major
- In 2020, he was promoted to Lieutenant Colonel
- Paris was appointed Acting Commissioner by Governor Shapiro on January 19, 2023.

== See also ==
- List of superintendents and commissioners of the Pennsylvania State Police
