= Frank McKetta =

- Born: February 19, 1917; Wyano, Pennsylvania, U.S.
- Died: December 29, 2006 (aged 89); Camphill, Pennsylvania, U.S.
- Police career
- Country: Pennsylvania, U.S.
- Department: State Police
- Service years: 34 Years with PA State Police
- Rank: 1967, Commissioner of the Pennsylvania State Police; Detective, Greensburg, Pennsylvania State Police Barracks, the Pennsylvania Crime Commission; Pennsylvania Counsel of Civil Defense; Pennsylvania Hazardous Substance Board; Governor's Commission of Drug Abuse; Governor's Task Force on Corrections; Governor's Traffic Safety Task Force; GSA (U.S. Government) chairman; Task Force on Protection-(U.S. Federal Protective Services)
- Other work: Frank McKetta. Police, politics, corruption: the mixture dangerous to freedom and justice. West Virginia: Mcclain Printing Co 2000 ISBN 978-0-87012-611-6.

Frank McKetta (1917–2006) was an American law enforcement officer from the U.S. state of Pennsylvania, best known for his efforts in fighting police corruption. The son of Ukrainian immigrants, he was born in a small coal mining village in western Pennsylvania. After a short stint working in the coal mines, he attended the Pennsylvania State Police Academy at Hershey, Pennsylvania, and started his career as a state trooper in 1937.

He was appointed commissioner of the Pennsylvania State Police in 1967, and in 1971 became the chief of the Federal Protective Service. He retired due to illness. McKetta developed a strong interest in fighting police corruption, racketeering, and influence peddling and became a speaker on the lecture circuit. His book, Police, politics, corruption: the mixture dangerous to freedom and justice, was released in 2000.

== Family history ==
The history of the McKetta family starts in the small town of Koroschenko, which means "pretty little village". This was located in the western edge of Ukraine and was the home of many unrelated families with the common name of Mukema (in Cyrillic). Within these families was a man named Wassail I, "Charles", Mukema. At the age of sixteen he joined Franz Joseph's Army. During his service, his section was captured and he was held in captivity for seven years. While in captivity, his betrothed, Catherine Melynk remained faithful, even though she had received no information about the status of Wassail. When she finally decided to marry someone else, Wassail arrived on the eve of her marriage in 1851. After he was identified, the wedding was canceled and the two were reunited in marriage. For his services in the Army, the country of Ukraine awarded the family with 100 acres (40 ha) of land.

After starting a life together, the two had one son, Wassail II, born in 1845. After the death of the late Wassail, the son inherited the land from his father. In order to pay for his partying and drinking, he sold all but 10 acres (4.0 ha) acres of the land. On this land, Wassail II married Anna Mchnyk with whom he had three sons, John (born 1889), Frank (born 1891), and Steve (born 1894). After his wife died, he remarried a young girl and had two daughters, Katherine and Bertha. The boys took care of the farm land, and neither the boys nor the girls received any type of schooling because Ukraine did not have any elementary schools in this area during the early 1900s.

In the late 19th and early 20th centuries the American steel companies looked to Central, Eastern, and Southern Europe to offer men jobs along with a free passage to America and $25 cash. In 1903 the eldest son, John, was only fourteen years old. While lying about his age when applying, he was fortunate to be invited to America. In January 1904, he started his journey to the United States and sent $20 of his $25 to his father back home. After a long journey, John docked in Baltimore. When filling out paper work at the immigration desk he was asked his name. As a result of no former education, he did not know how to spell his name and his last name was in Cyrillic, which has no spelling (it is only phonetic). With John's pronunciation, the immigration officer gave him the spelling of "McKetta". From Baltimore he was sent to Wyano, Pennsylvania, where he began work in the coal mine six days a week. After four years of labor he had saved enough money to send for his brother Frank and another two years later for Steve.

Brother on the left and Frank McKetta on the right

In 1910, Frank boarded with John and bride, Mary. Frank received his citizenship papers in 1908, and in 1914, he and Nancy Julia McKetta were married.

== Biography ==
On February 19, 1917, Frank McKetta was born in Wyano, Pennsylvania. A daughter, Mary, followed in 1919, and then a son, Steve, on November 7, 1921.

Although they owned their own home, Frank McKetta and his family struggled during the Great Depression, when tragedy struck in 1936 with the death of Frank's father in a mining accident. His mother was left alone to raise the family during this economic struggle. The family survived with the help of a cow that was kept in a shed along with a pig and some chickens. They all helped keeping up a garden and during Frank's younger years, they had no outside form of income. Frank McKetta was lucky to be a part of a family in which all of the children received high school education at this time in history. He attended South Huntingdon High School which is now known as Yough High School. After high school only one of his sisters went to college. Frank McKetta chose to work along with family members at the McKetta Coal Company until he saved enough money to enter into the police academy. After saving enough money, he entered the Police Academy in Hershey, Pennsylvania, on September 1, 1937. His career as a trooper started when he was first assigned in Luzerne County, where he was able to see first-hand the signs of corruption in the law enforcement. He later attended Indiana University, in Bloomington, Indiana, to take a summer course in 1963 on Advanced Police Management.

== Early law enforcement career ==
=== First assignment and police corruption ===
McKetta's first assignment set the tone of his career. He was asked to accompany a senior trooper at a local police force raid on a well-known gambling den. He was cautioned when attempting to arrest anyone by his supervisor. Once entering the den they found just a penny-ante poker game in the back room. They found no hard evidence, large sums of money, or big-name racketeers. A racket deals with organized crime. While McKetta was new, he assumed that his effort was a small part of a larger number raids taking place elsewhere but soon found out that this was not the case. The newspaper the next day distorted the facts and made it seem as if the local police force was helped by the state police in fighting against organized crime. McKetta discussed this with older troopers who did not agree with the system, but said they recently decided to follow orders and did not have input on the fight against organized crime. McKetta did not like how things were working and would later realize that this problem would bother him for the remainder of his career. It was hard for him to come to the realization that the "famed state police noted for legendary exploits in fighting the forces of evil was mostly a myth and that his chosen field of endeavor was in reality the tool of politicians." Throughout the next several years, McKetta had found nothing but more disappointing facts about the state police. There was a strict "home rule" policy placed on the state police jurisdiction. This prohibited outside troopers from going into any community during the investigation of other crimes and simply tried to keep the state police out. While he searched for answers and some reasoning, his attitude was considered a subtle form of insubordination and was labeled a "radical" and a "misfit", but an idealist by his own friends. His attitude was the reasoning that he was transferred frequently and had many assignment changes.

=== Reassigned as a detective ===
Things did not change during the 1950s when McKetta was stationed as a detective assigned to the Greensburg, Pennsylvania, troop headquarters. He had stated that he recalled idly sitting by as a city police cruiser drove around as a well-known numbers writer to pick up his cash and number slips. He was powerless because of the governor's home rule policy and their own orders from their supervisors prohibited them from doing anything about the organized crime.

McKetta was also assigned as a detective in western Pennsylvania under Governor Fine, Commissioner Wilhelm, and Squadron One Commander Major Andrew J. Hudock. McKetta was called to assist the Westmoreland County detectives on a raid. The directions of the raid led them to a house outside of Monessen. There were no lights on and no activity inside, which was abnormal because it was a house of prostitution on a Saturday night. Because Frank was previously stationed in Belle Vernon, Pennsylvania, which covered the similar area, he advised the others of another whorehouse on the other side of Monessen. A few of the men pretended to not hear this comment and stated something about being within city limits and outside of their designated land. A couple other men decided to take the lead and found the girls inside the other building. The girls were placed under arrest and their work was done by midnight. Upon returning to the Greensburg office, they noticed the mayor's office light was still on as they entered their own office across the hall. The political corruption was evident when they were in trouble for entering the city of Monessen rather than being applauded for their work. McKetta eventually served several positions within the state police force and was assigned in several different counties. For instance, after being promoted as a detective in 1952, he became a Detective-Sergeant in 1954, then a Lieutenant in 1956 and later became assistant superintendent of the State Police Academy with a Captain's rank. He also served in Greensburg, Erie, Somerset, New Kensington, Ebensburg, and Pittsburgh. Throughout this time he collected and observed cases of police corruption which were documented in the Frank McKetta Papers.

== Career in law enforcement leadership ==
=== State commissioner ===
In 1967 Frank McKetta was appointed the commissioner of the State Police by Governor Raymond P. Shafer. Shafer was satisfied with his previous background in dealing with labor disturbances and his efforts to establish troop training programs. He also agreed with Frank's work and position on rackets, corruption, and his attempts to progress the state police force. "As a veteran of more than three decades of experience covering all phases of police work beginning as a patrolman, Major McKetta is completely qualified to head the force he has served so well", said Shafer. Not everyone believed that making McKetta commissioner was going to be positive for the state police. The same people that persecuted a previous deputy commissioner for a wiretap scandal made allegations that McKetta was involved, but this was easily disproved and the Senate unanimously confirmed him as the commissioner.

Now as a higher rank, Frank McKetta immediately attempted to assemble a qualified staff whose loyalty was to the department rather than political benefactors. He wanted to repair the flawed Pennsylvania State Police System and create a police force based upon the oath in which all officers are sworn in under. He had a hard time finding out who he could and could not trust. With this in mind, he created a department who he thought believed in similar ideals and had the same goals for the department. While commissioner, he continued fighting the rackets where the previous commissioner left off. At the time, the state police was divided into fifteen troops who were commanded by higher officers who in turn were commanded by an even higher rank. Under this, McKetta watched all of the activities of rackets as well as putting undercover officers in the field who would feed him useful information.

=== Dealing firsthand with corruption and politics ===
During the time that McKetta was a trooper and non-commissioned officer, he was able to see first hand some of the political influences on local and state police. When appointed commissioner he was able to see further into the corruption of the police force and how it attempted to affect him and his staff. One prime example was the downfall of his deputy commissioner, Lt. Colonel Dussia. While McKetta had high hopes and found him to be a likable person, it was not long until he was able to see he was "wired in" with the politicians and some questionable characters.

From the start Dussia was unhappy about not receiving the commissioner's position after hearing word from a politician that the job was his. Shortly after being sworn in, Dussia approached McKetta about holding a banquet for him because he was a local boy who was making it big. The sponsor of the banquet was supposed to be a local businessman from Greensburg, where he had previously worked in his career. With this knowledge McKetta accepted the offer but soon found from an old friend and fellow police officer that the banquet was actually being sponsored by a local racketeer. This was a prime opportunity for a racket to promote himself by having ties with a state police commissioner. Now learning the truth behind this plan, he told Dussia to cancel the banquet without letting him know of his recent knowledge about the sponsor issue. This would only be the first of Dussia's attempts to bring McKetta down along with others who would eventually harass him and his family. After making progress in the arrest of many racketeers and conducting many raids, a judge started asking questions about his radar operations. After McKetta showed him, he was asked to have lunch with the judge at a restaurant where politicians and racketeers often meet. His attempts to request a change in the location were refused, however he agreed to have lunch. During the meal, the judge got up briefly and the senator quickly made a bribe for a large amount of money. McKetta pretended not to hear the senator and began conversation with an associate who sat down at a nearby table.

=== Involving his home life ===
During McKetta's years as commissioner, his family was threatened with phone calls, and his own son was attacked outside his apartment.

After refusing the proposal from the senator, he received several threatening telephone calls to his home which affected himself as well as his family. Several instances occurred when McKetta was driving home in the evening from the office and a car would force him off the road. At the time McKetta thought was just a poor driver. Later that night at 2:00 am McKetta received a phone call at his house from a disguised voice. The person stated what time he left his office and the exact route he took to his house. He then spoke of how easy it would be to kill him. After this he and his family received other phone calls that said things along the lines of "watch your step" and so on. The State Police Commissioner and his family did not take them seriously as they assumed no one would do anything because of the negative publicity it would bring to them. This assumption was quickly proven wrong when one morning around 2:00am there was a call saying "Your son will tell you what happened." He then learned that at about 10:30am that morning his wife received a call from their son telling her that two men had held him up in front of his apartment at the University of Pittsburgh. He described them as two white middle aged men wearing suits and ties. They were standing outside his doorway when he came home. He thought nothing of them because of their attire. As he walked by one, he was struck from behind and then attacked by the other. He was slashed in the chest by what seemed like a razor and finally crawled under a parked car and called for help. The men walked casually away and when the Pittsburgh City Police arrived, they took his name and then did not even come out of the car to take his report. This showed that whoever attacked Frank McKetta III had an in with the police. Now that his work was beginning to affect the safety of his family, he became more cautious about their safety but refused to stop his attacks on political corruption and the rackets.

=== Retirement from state commissioner ===
After several years of fighting to make a change in the state police department, McKetta was offered a job with the U.S. General Services Administration to help with heading the organization that provides security to all federal buildings in the nation. By 1971 his common sense told him it was time to leave the state police and take full advantage of this new opportunity. He stayed until the end of the governor's term and learned that it was smart to take the job in Washington D.C. because he was going to be replaced with the new governor.

He accepted the position as chief of the Federal Protective Service and then later in June 1972 was named assistant commissioner. He worked in the management office which governed security at federal installations nationwide.

After five years working in Washington DC, Frank McKetta was faced with a severe arthritic condition affecting his spine. As a result of this he left his position in 1976 but made it a point to stay contacted with people still inside the GSA to help with the corruption that had developed at the federal level.

== Legacy ==
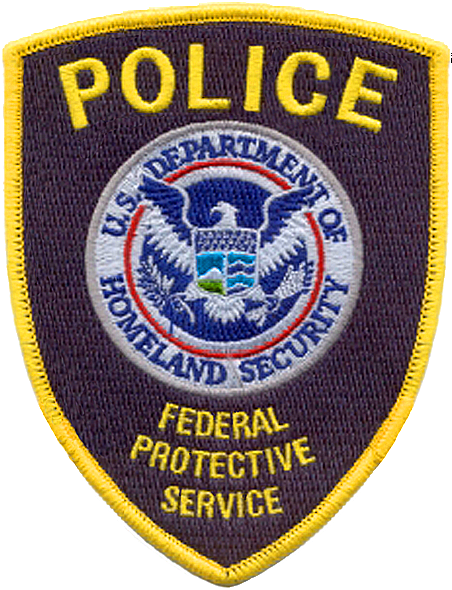
Patch of the U.S. Federal Protective Service.

=== Theories and Influences on the Police Department ===
Throughout his career and even after retirement, Col. Frank McKetta addressed and tried to fix many problems throughout the State Police Force. Here are a few of the main concerns and solutions he worked on and expressed with great emphasis to the police department:

1. "Models for police departments should be based on demographic and community needs." Each size and location should be specific to the quantity of officers. He also believed that overstaffing was an opportunity for less control as well as less personal contact with civilians. With this, he also believed that assignments should be rotated for career development as well as prevention against stratification in the agency.
2. McKetta believed that each recruit should be evaluated according to qualifications and without any bias towards favoritism or political affiliations.
3. When promotions are made open or needed, McKetta believed in written examinations and when necessary, an oral assessment with board interviews. Each promotion should be documented and this process is required for every move in rank.
4. McKetta felt that basic training should be used "in a prescribed curriculum to meet community needs" He also believed that all personnel should be required to take specialized courses and refreshers to keep their knowledge up to date. In addition, he felt that higher education should be offered for certain candidates.
5. He felt that salaries should be determined according to position and determined by national standards. However, certain areas should be paid higher as a result to a higher cost of living. With this he felt that pension plans should also be put into place to permit lateral entry within the entire police system without penalty.
6. McKetta emphasized the need to have a national police academy similar to military academies like the Naval Academy and West Point. These should be established at a federal level in which the state and local advisory boards participate. The purpose of an academy would be to "help insure the professionalism we so often speak of"

=== Served with ===
Frank McKetta served three years on active duty with the military during 1943 to 1946, and retired from the U.S. Army Reserve Program after 20 years of service.

- the Pennsylvania Crime Commission
- Pennsylvania Counsel of Civil Defense
- Pennsylvania Hazardous Substance Board
- Governor's Commission of Drug Abuse
- Governor's Task Force on Corrections
- Governor's Traffic Safety Task Force
- GSA (U.S. Government) chairman
- Task Force on Protection-(U.S. Federal Protective Services)

Frank McKetta published his book, Police, Politics, Corruption, in 2000; "The mixture dangerous to freedom and justice".

=== Death ===
Frank and his wife Ann, who stood by him through "long working hours, low pay, and little home life"

Frank McKetta died Friday, December 29, 2006, in Seidel Hospital, Pennsylvania, at the age of 89. He was married to Ann McKetta, and together they had one son, Frank McKetta III.

Frank McKetta expressed a great deal of gratitude towards his family who stood by his side through his journey through the police department. "My parents, Frank McKetta, Sr. and Nancy Julia McKetta gave the inspiration and a value system which they passed on to me and my three siblings. My loving and patient wife, Ann (Harsanyi) and our son, Frank III, who were too often neglected by the absence of a husband and father during my early career as a state trooper. They supported me through trying times which included long working hours, low pay, and little home life. Without their sacrifices and those of my parents, none of my eventual success would have been possible." A small excerpt from his book illustrates how involved he was with the police department and how much it impacted his life at home.
