= Melcroft, Pennsylvania =

Unincorporated community in Pennsylvania, US

- Unincorporated community
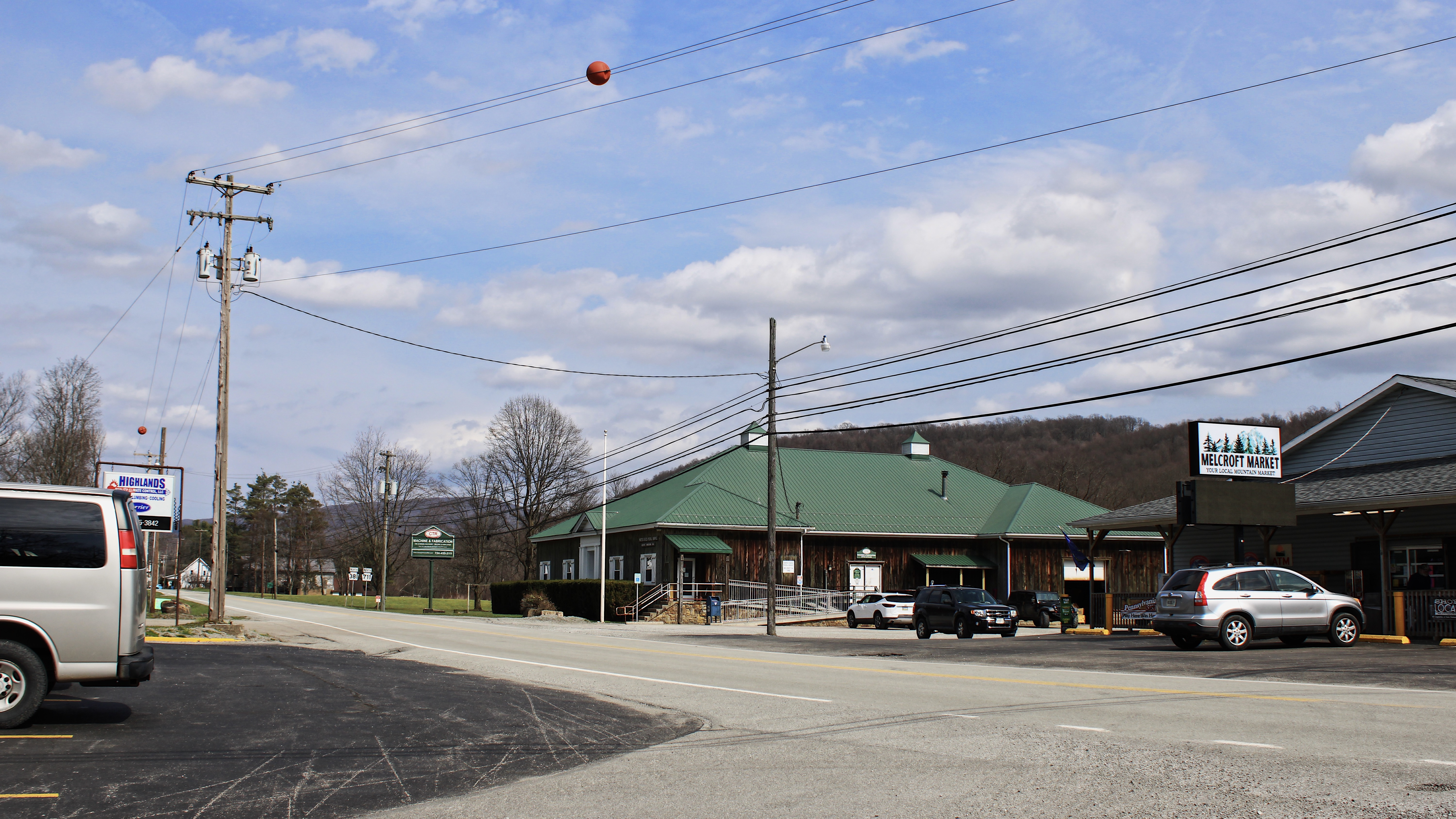
- Melcroft Road

- Location within Pennsylvania Location within the United States
- Coordinates: 40°03′07″N 79°23′21″W
- Country: United States
- State: Pennsylvania
- County: Fayette
- Elevation: 1,417 ft (432 m)
- Time zone: UTC−5 (Eastern (EST))
  - Summer (DST): UTC−4 (EDT)
- ZIP code: 15462
- Area codes: 724, 878
- GNIS feature ID: 1180877

Melcroft is an unincorporated community in Saltlick Township in Fayette County, Pennsylvania, United States. The community is located along state routes 381 and 711, 10.9 miles (17.5 km) east-northeast of Connellsville. Melcroft has a post office, with ZIP code 15462, which opened on September 13, 1918.

== History ==
The community's name is an amalgamation of Mellon and Croft, surnames of businessmen in the local mining industry.

=== 2018 shooting ===
In 2018, a mass shooting at a car wash left five people dead, including the perpetrator, and a sixth person with minor injuries. The incident occurred on January 28, 2018, at Ed's Car Wash, just before 3:00 a.m., in the Melcroft community of Saltlick Township, south-east of Pittsburgh. There was supposed to be a fistfight between Smith and Porterfield, but the other victims did not have any idea what was going on, according to police. Chelsie Cline, 25, her half-brother, Seth Cline, 21, her boyfriend at the time, William "Billy" Porterfield, 27, a friend, Cortney Snyder, 23, and another unidentified woman, met with 28-year-old Timothy O’Brien Smith at the car wash. Smith had previously been in a relationship with Cline and reportedly had an ongoing feud with Porterfield, who was her boyfriend at the time. Surveillance video had shown Smith grabbing Porterfield from behind earlier that morning at the Tall Cedars bar. Smith arrived at the car wash wearing a body armor carrier without the ballistic panels, and was armed with an AR-15 semi-automatic rifle, a .308-caliber rifle, and a 9mm handgun.

Smith opened fire on the victims with both his AR-15 semiautomatic rifle and 9mm handgun. First, he killed both Cline and Porterfield, by gunning them down in the car wash's parking lot after they stepped out of their sedan. He then killed Snyder and Cline's half-brother as they sat in their pickup truck. The unidentified woman with them who sat in the back of the vehicle survived after being taken to hospital. In total, three vehicles were towed from the location, two were pickup trucks and the other was a sedan. After killing four people, Smith turned the gun on himself and shot himself in the head. He initially survived, but died at a hospital just before 10:00 p.m. An autopsy confirmed that all fatal victims had been shot multiple times. At the time, it was the deadliest shooting in the U.S. in the year 2018, until it was surpassed by the Stoneman Douglas High School shooting just seventeen days later.
