= J. Simpson Africa =

American politician (1832–1900)

Secretary of Internal Affairs of Pennsylvania
- In office 1883–1887
- Preceded by: Aaron K. Dunkle
- Succeeded by: Thomas J. Stewart

Personal details
- Born: September 15, 1832 Huntingdon, Pennsylvania, U.S.
- Died: August 8, 1900 (aged 67) Huntingdon, Pennsylvania, U.S.
- Party: Democratic
- Spouse: Dorothe C. Greenland (m. 1856; died 1886)
- Occupation: Civil engineer

John Simpson Africa (September 15, 1832 – August 8, 1900) was an American politician who was Secretary of Internal Affairs of Pennsylvania from 1883 to 1887.

== Early life ==
Africa was born on September 15, 1832 in Huntingdon, Pennsylvania. His father, Daniel Africa, was a deputy surveyor and justice of the peace for Huntingdon County, Pennsylvania. His paternal great-grandfather, Christopher Africa, immigrated from the Kingdom of Hanover to Germantown, Philadelphia in the middle of the 18th century. His maternal relatives were from Scotland, immigrating to Lancaster, Pennsylvania in 1730. His maternal great-grandfather, James Murray, served in a Lancaster County company during the American Revolutionary War.

Africa was educated in the Huntingdon public schools and the Huntingdon Academy. After completing his education, he worked as a surveyor and civil engineer alongside his father and uncle, James Simpson. In 1853, he joined the engineering corps of the Huntingdon and Broad Top Mountain Railroad and Coal Company.

== Politics ==
In October 1853, Africa was elected surveyor of Huntingdon County. He ran for reelection in 1856, but the race ended in a tie and his opponent was appointed to the position by a court. He was elected a burgess of Huntingdon in 1854, 1855, and 1869 and was chief burgess from 1871 to 1874. During the 1858 and 1859 sessions, Africa was a journal clerk in the Pennsylvania State Senate. In 1860, he represented Huntingdon County in the Pennsylvania House of Representatives.

In 1875, Africa was appointed deputy Secretary of Internal Affairs of Pennsylvania by William McCandless. Africa was responsible for organizing the new department. He was the Democratic nominee for Secretary of Internal Affairs in 1878, but lost to Republican Aaron K. Dunkle. At the request of United States Senator William A. Wallace, President Rutherford B. Hayes appointed Africa as supervisor of the 1880 United States census in Pennsylvania's 7th district, which consisted of fourteen Central Pennsylvania counties stretching from York County to Clearfield County. After the census, Africa left politics to become the cashier of the First National Bank of Huntingdon.

At the 1882 Democratic state convention, Africa was unanimously chosen to be the party's candidate for Secretary of Internal Affairs. The Democratic ticket carried that year's elections, with Africa receiving a plurality of about 37,000. He ran for reelection in 1886, but lost to Republican Thomas J. Stewart 413,795 votes to 367,853.

== Writing ==
From 1853 to 1855, he was the owner and editor of Standing Stone, a weekly newspaper. In 1883, he edited History of Huntingdon & Blair Counties, a comprehensive history of Huntingdon County.

== Personal life ==
On January 1, 1856, Africa married Dorothe C. Greenland, the eldest daughter of Huntingdon County sheriff Joshua Greenland. They had five children, two of who predeceased Africa. Dorothe Africa died on November 15, 1886.

Africa's paternal ancestors were Lutherans, but he followed the religion of his mother's family – Presbyterianism. He served as a trustee and treasurer of the Huntingdon Presbyterian church. He was a member of the Mount Moriah lodge and Standing Stone chapter of the Freemasons and was grand master of the Grand Lodge of Pennsylvania from 1891 to 1892. He was also a member of the Engineers' Club, Franklin Institute, and Pennsylvania Scotch-Irish Society.

== Later life ==
In 1882, Africa helped incorporate the Union Trust Company of Philadelphia. He was elected president of the company on October 13, 1887. He also served as a director of the First National Bank of Huntingdon and the Fidelity Mutual Life Association of Philadelphia.

Africa died on August 8, 1900 at his home in Huntingdon from a "valvular affliction of the heart". Although he had been ill for several months, his death was unexpected.
