= Gen. Thomas J. Stewart Memorial Armory =

- U.S. National Register of Historic Places
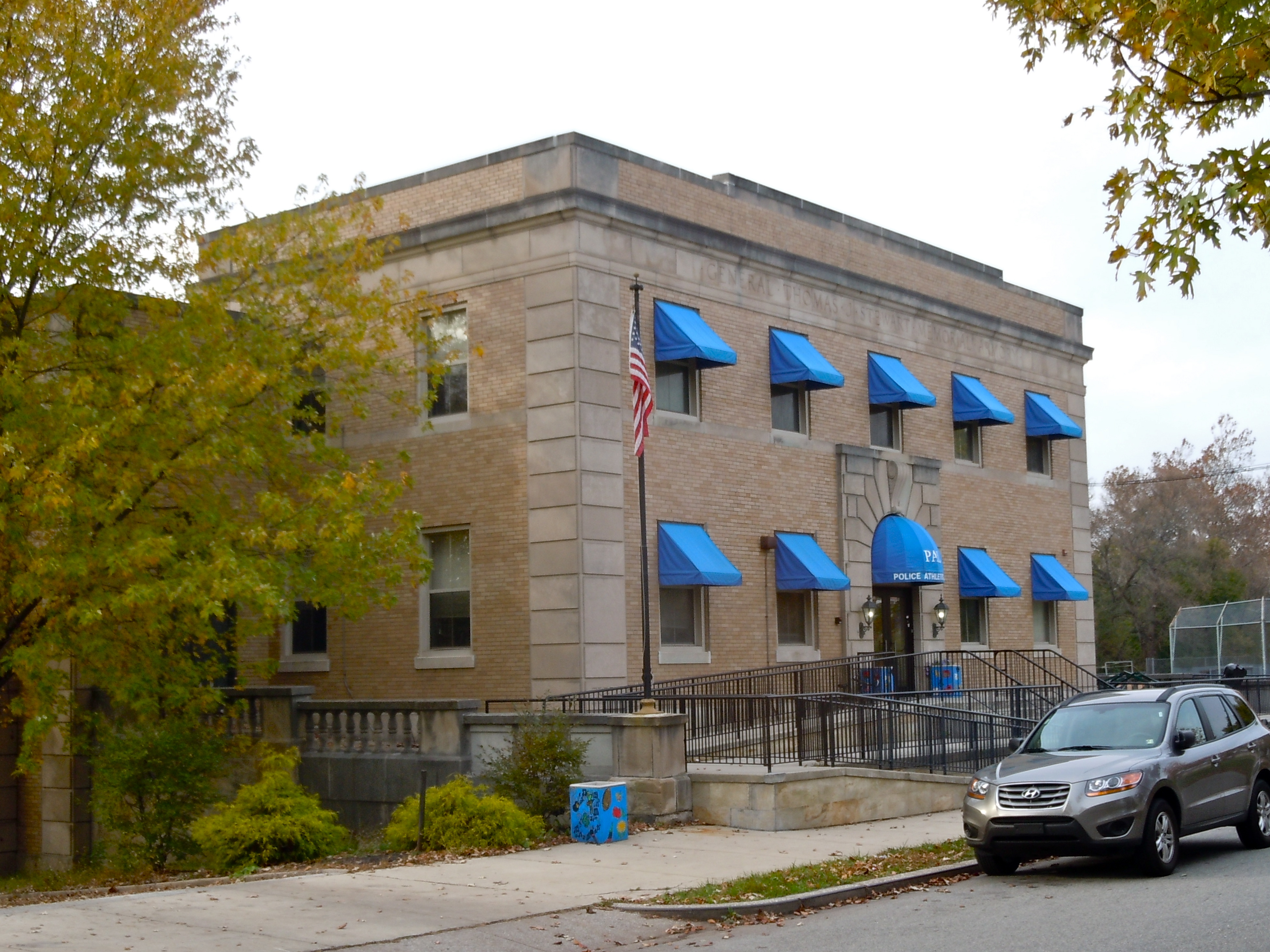
- Gen. Thomas J. Stewart Memorial Armory, November 2011

- Location within Pennsylvania Location within the United States
- Location: 340 Harding Blvd., Norristown, Pennsylvania
- Coordinates: 40°7′28″N 75°20′41″W
- Area: 0.6 acres (0.24 ha)
- Built: 1927-1928
- Built by: Herong, Frank R.
- Architect: Johnson, Philip H.
- Architectural style: Classical Revival
- MPS: Pennsylvania National Guard Armories MPS
- NRHP reference No.: 91000904
- Added to NRHP: July 12, 1991

Gen. Thomas J. Stewart Memorial Armory, also known as Norristown Armory, is a historic National Guard armory located at Norristown, Montgomery County, Pennsylvania. It was built in 1927-1928, and is a "T"-plan building consisting of a two-story administration building with a two-story rear drill hall section executed in the Classical Revival style. The building is constructed of yellow brick on a concrete foundation, with decorative stonework and a parapet. It is named in honor of Thomas J. Stewart, a Norristown resident who was Adjutant General of Pennsylvania from 1895 until his death in 1917.

It was added to the National Register of Historic Places in 1991.
