= Sandi Vito =

American politician

Secretary of the Pennsylvania Department of Labor and Industry
- In office April 23, 2009 – 2010
- Preceded by: Stephen Schmerin
- Succeeded by: Julia K. Hearthway

Personal details
- Party: Democratic
- Education: Stockton State University; Temple University

Sandi Vito was the Secretary of the Pennsylvania Department of Labor and Industry, a cabinet-level department in the Government of Pennsylvania. She was named Acting Secretary of Labor and Industry in February 2008, replacing Stephen Schmerin. She was confirmed by the Pennsylvania Senate on April 23, 2009 by a vote of 45-5.

Prior to that, she was chief of staff to State Senator Christine Tartaglione and political director of the Pennsylvania Democratic Party. She earned a degree in economics from Stockton State University and studied Community and Regional Planning and Urban Studies at Temple University. In 2009, Vito was arrested after drinking heavily at a downtown Harrisburg bar. According to police, Vito was "too drunk to sign the citation."

She was named to the PoliticsPA list of "Pennsylvania's Smartest Staffers and Operatives." In 2002, she was named to the PoliticsPA "Sy Snyder's Power 50" list of politically influential people in Pennsylvania. She was named to the PoliticsPA "Democratic Dream Team" list of top political operatives in Pennsylvania. She was named to the PoliticsPA list of "Pennsylvania's Most Politically Powerful Women."
