= John K. Tabor =

American politician (1921–1999)

United States Under Secretary of Commerce
- In office 1973–1975
- President: Richard Nixon; Gerald Ford
- Preceded by: James Thomas Lynn
- Succeeded by: James Baker

Pennsylvania Secretary of Labor and Industry
- In office 1968–1969
- Governor: Raymond P. Shafer
- Preceded by: William Joseph Hart
- Succeeded by: Clifford L. Jones

Secretary of Internal Affairs of Pennsylvania
- In office 1967–1969
- Preceded by: Genevieve Blatt
- Succeeded by: Position abolished

Pennsylvania Secretary of Commerce
- In office 1963–1967
- Governor: William Scranton
- Preceded by: Thomas J. Monaghan
- Succeeded by: Clifford L. Jones

Personal details
- Born: April 19, 1921 Uniontown, Pennsylvania
- Died: September 6, 1999 (aged 78) Washington, D.C.
- Party: Republican
- Education: Yale University; Cambridge University; Harvard Law School

John Kaye Tabor (April 19, 1921 – September 6, 1999) was an American lawyer and government official who served as Secretary of Internal Affairs of Pennsylvania (1967–1968), Pennsylvania Secretary of Labor and Industry (1968–1969), and United States Under Secretary of Commerce (1973–1975). He was the Republican nominee in the 1969 Pittsburgh mayoral election.

== Early life ==
Tabor was born on April 19, 1921 in Uniontown, Pennsylvania. He grew up in Pittsburgh, where his father Edward O. Tabor, was an attorney and political figure. Tabor competed in the 1936 national Soap Box Derby in Akron, Ohio.

Tabor attended Taylor Allderdice High School the Shady Side Academy. He graduated Yale University in 1943 and immediately joined the United States Navy. During World War II, he held the rank of lieutenant and commanded a minesweeper in the Pacific theater. He earned his master of arts degree from Cambridge University in 1947 and his law degree from Harvard Law School in 1950.

== Career ==
Tabor worked for the law firm of Winthrop, Stimson, Putnam & Roberts in New York City from 1950 to 1953. He returned to Pittsburgh and worked for Kirkpatrick, Pomeroy, Lockhart & Johnson. In 1960, he campaigned for Republican presidential candidate Nelson Rockefeller. In 1961, he was a Republican candidate for the Pittsburgh City Council.

Tabor active in William Scranton's 1962 Pennsylvania gubernatorial campaign and was appointed to serve as his secretary of commerce. In 1966, he was the Republican nominee for Secretary of Internal Affairs. He narrowly defeated Democratic incumbent Genevieve Blatt by less than 2% of the vote. On May 16, 1967, Tabor's office was one of two abolished through a referendum. Governor Raymond P. Shafer, issued an executive order temporarily keeping the department open. Tabor considered challenging Joseph S. Clark Jr. in the 1968 United States Senate election, but chose to back Richard Schweiker, as he felt a primary election would harm their chances of beating the incumbent. In 1968, he was appointed secretary of labor and industry as part of the phasing out of the department of internal affairs.

Tabor resigned as secretary of labor and industry on March 5, 1969 to enter the Pittsburgh mayoral election. Although Pittsburgh was an heavily Democratic city, Tabor was seen as the strongest Republican candidate in many years. He brought in Albert E. Abrahams, who directed Charles Mathias' upset over Daniel Brewster in the 1968 United States Senate election in Maryland, to manage his campaign. He ran as a "law and order" candidate, offering a 13-point anti-crime program. Tabor was the first Republican candidate in 20 years to be endorsed by the Pittsburgh Post-Gazette, but the more conservative Pittsburgh Press backed his Democratic opponent, Peter F. Flaherty. Flaherty's surprise victory over the establishment-backed Harry Kramer in the Democratic primary undercut Tabor's anti-machine rhetoric and hurt his chances of winning. Flaherty defeated Tabor by a wide margin – 118,600 to 62,500.

Tabor was the co-chairman of the Western Pennsylvania Committee for the Re-Election of the President during the 1972 United States presidential election. In 1973, President Richard Nixon appointed Tabor United States Under Secretary of Commerce. He resigned in 1975 to allow new United States Secretary of Commerce Rogers Morton to appoint his own undersecretary. President Gerald Ford hoped to move Tabor to another office, but he declined.

== Later life ==
After leaving office, Tabor joined the Washington, D.C. law firm of Purcell & Nelson. In 1981, he was diagnosed with Parkinson's disease, which led to reduced duties at the firm. He also taught a course in corporate law at George Mason University. He retired in 1990. He continued to reside in Washington and wrote a biography of his father. He died on September 6, 1999 from a stroke. His son, John Tabor, is the former president of Seacoast Media Group and a city councilor in Portsmouth, New Hampshire.
