= 2nd Pennsylvania Reserve Regiment =

Union Army infantry regiment

2nd Pennsylvania Reserve Regiment (31st Pennsylvania Volunteer Infantry)
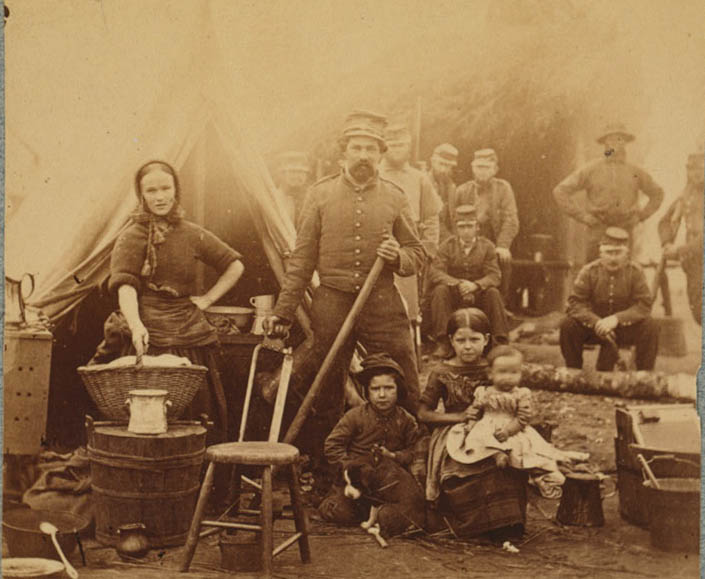
- Photograph of the camp life of the 31st Pennsylvania Infantry 1862
- Active: 1861 to June 16, 1864
- Country: United States
- Allegiance: Union
- Branch: Infantry
- Engagements: Seven Days Battles; Battle of Mechanicsville; Battle of Gaines's Mill; Battle of Savage's Station; Battle of Glendale; Battle of Malvern Hill; Second Battle of Bull Run; Battle of South Mountain; Battle of Antietam; Battle of Fredericksburg; Battle of Gettysburg; Bristoe Campaign; Mine Run Campaign; Battle of the Wilderness; Battle of Spotsylvania Court House; Battle of North Anna; Battle of Cold Harbor

The 2nd Pennsylvania Reserve Regiment also known as the 31st Pennsylvania Volunteer Infantry was an infantry regiment that served in the Union Army as part of the Pennsylvania Reserves infantry division during the American Civil War.

== Organization ==
Company	Moniker	Primary Location of Recruitment	Captains
A	The Penn Rifles	Philadelphia	George A. Woodward
B	The Governor's Rangers	Philadelphia	Patrick McDonough
C	The Hiberian Target Company	Philadelphia	James N. Byrnes
D	The Governor's Rangers	Philadelphia	Richard Ellis
E	The Scotch Rifles	Philadelphia	John Orr Finnie
F	The Governor's Rangers	Philadelphia	Thomas Bringhurst
G	The Taggart Guards	Philadelphia	Evan M. Woodward
H	The Independent Rangers	Philadelphia	Timothy Mealey
I	The Constitution Rangers	Philadelphia	William Knox
K	The Consolidation Guards	Philadelphia	Patrick J. Smith

== Service ==
The 2nd Pennsylvania Reserves was organized in Philadelphia, Pennsylvania in Fall 1861 and mustered into the service in May 1862 under the command of Colonel William B. Mann.

The regiment was attached to 1st Brigade, McCall's Pennsylvania Reserves Division, Army of the Potomac, to March 1862. 1st Brigade, 2nd Division, I Corps, Army of the Potomac, to April 1862. 1st Brigade, McCall's Division, Department of the Rappahannock, to June 1862. 1st Brigade, 3rd Division, V Corps, Army of the Potomac, to August 1862. 1st Brigade, 3rd Division, III Corps, Army of Virginia, to September 1862. 1st Brigade, 3rd Division, I Corps, Army of the Potomac, to February 1863. 1st Brigade, Pennsylvania Reserves Division, XXII Corps, Department of Washington, to June 1863. 1st Brigade, 3rd Division, V Corps, Army of the Potomac, to June 1864.

The 2nd Pennsylvania Reserves mustered out June 16, 1864.

== Detailed service ==
Moved to Easton, Pa., May 29, 1861, then to Harrisburg, Pa., July 24. Moved to Baltimore, then to Sandy Hook, near Harpers Ferry, Va. Ordered to Darnestown, Md., August 28; then to Tennallytown, Md., September 25 and joined McCall. Moved to Langley, Va., October 10, 1861, and duty at Camp Pierpont until March 1862. Reconnaissance toward Dranesville October 18–21, 1861. Expedition to Grinnell's Farm December 6. Advance on Manassas, Va., March 10–15. McDowell's advance on Falmouth April 9–19. Duty at Fredericksburg until June. Moved to White House June 9–11. Seven Days before Richmond June 25-July 1. Battles of Mechanicsville June 26. Gaine's Mill June 27. Savage's Station June 29. Charles City Cross Roads and Glendale June 30. Malvern Hill July 1. At Harrison's Landing until August 16. Movement to join Pope August 16–26. Battle of Groveton August 29; Second Battle of Bull Run August 30. Maryland Campaign September 6–24. Battles of South Mountain September 14, and Antietam, September 16–17. Duty in Maryland until October 30. Movement to Falmouth, Va., October 30-November 19. Battle of Fredericksburg, Va., December 12–15. "Mud March" January 20–24, 1863. Ordered to Washington, D.C., and duty in the defenses there until June 25. Rejoined the Army of the Potomac. Battle of Gettysburg, July 1–3. Pursuit of Lee July 5–24. Bristoe Campaign October 9–22. Advance to line of the Rappahannock November 7–8. Rappahannock Station November 7. Mine Run Campaign November 26-December 2. Rapidan Campaign May 1864. Battles of the Wilderness May 5–7. Laurel Hill May 8. Spotsylvania May 8–12. Spotsylvania Court House May 12–21. Assault on the Salient May 12. Harris Farm May 19. North Anna River May 23–26. Jericho Ford May 25. On line of the Pamunkey May 26–28. Totopotomoy May 28–31. Left front June 1, 1864.

== Casualties ==
The regiment lost a total of 151 men during service; 4 officers and 73 enlisted men killed or mortally wounded, 3 officers and 71 enlisted men died of disease.

== Commanders ==
- Colonel William B. Mann - resigned November 1, 1861
- Colonel William McCandless
- Lieutenant Colonel George A. Woodward - commanded at the Battle of Gettysburg
- Captain James N. Byrnes - commanded at the Battle of Antietam
- Captain Timothy Mealey - commanded at the Battle of Fredericksburg after Col. McCandless was promoted to brigade command

== See also ==
- List of Pennsylvania Civil War Units
- Pennsylvania in the Civil War
