= Pennsylvania Department of Labor and Industry =

Agency overview
- Formed: 1913; 113 years ago
- Jurisdiction: Commonwealth of Pennsylvania
- Headquarters: Harrisburg, Pennsylvania
- Employees: 5,000
- Agency executive: Nancy Walker, Secretary
- Website: www.dli.pa.gov

The Pennsylvania Department of Labor and Industry (L&I) is a cabinet-level agency in the Government of Pennsylvania. The agency is charged with the task of overseeing the health and safety of workers, enforcement of the Pennsylvania Uniform Construction Code, vocational rehabilitation for people with disabilities, and administration of unemployment benefits and Workers' compensation.

== History ==
When this agency was founded by Governor John Kinley Tener, John Price Jackson was appointed as the first Commissioner. Jackson was confirmed in post by Governor Martin Grove Brumbaugh on June 2, 1917, but took a leave of absence from state office when accepted a Commission in the US Army following the United States entry into the First World War.

== Secretaries of labor and industry ==
Name	Dates served	Appointed by
John Price Jackson	1913–1919	John K. Tener
Clifford B. Connelley	1919–1923	William Cameron Sproul
Royal Meeker	1923–1925	Gifford Pinchot
Richard H. Lansburgh	1925–1927	Gifford Pinchot
Charles A. Waters	1927–1929	John Stuchell Fisher
Peter Glick	1929–1931	John Stuchell Fisher
Arthur Miller Northrop	1931–1933	Gifford Pinchot
Charlotte E. Carr	1933–1935	Gifford Pinchot
Edward Noel Jones	1935	George Howard Earle III
Ralph Moody Bashore	1935–1939	George Howard Earle III
Lewis G. Hines	1939–1943	Arthur James
William H. Chestnut	1943–1951	Edward Martin
David M. Walker	1951–1955	John S. Fine
John R. Torquato	1955–1957	George M. Leader
William L. Batt, Jr.	1957–1961	George M. Leader
A. Allen Sulcowe	1961–1963	David L. Lawrence
William P. Young	1963–1967	William Scranton
William Joseph Hart	1967–1968	Raymond P. Shafer
John K. Tabor	1968–1969	Raymond P. Shafer
Clifford L. Jones	1969–1970	Raymond P. Shafer
Theodore Robb	1970–1971	Raymond P. Shafer
Paul J. Smith	1971–1979	Milton Shapp
Myron L. Joseph	1979	Dick Thornburgh
Charles J. Lieberth	1979–1981	Dick Thornburgh
Barry H. Stern	1981–1984	Dick Thornburgh
James Knepper	1984–1987	Dick Thornburgh
Harris Wofford	1987–1991	Bob Casey Sr.
Tom Foley	1991–1994	Bob Casey Sr.
Robert S. Barnett	1994–1995	Bob Casey Sr.
Johnny J. Butler	1995–2003	Tom Ridge
Stephen Schmerin	2003–2008	Ed Rendell
Sandi Vito	2008–2011	Ed Rendell
Julia K. Hearthway	2011–2015	Tom Corbett
Kathy Manderino	2015–2017	Tom Wolf
Jerry Oleksiak	2017–2020	Tom Wolf
Jennifer Berrier	2020–2023	Tom Wolf
Nancy Walker	2023–present	Josh Shapiro

== See also ==
- Government of Pennsylvania
- List of Pennsylvania state agencies
