= Grand Lodge of Pennsylvania =

Grand Lodge in Pennsylvania in United States of America

Coordinates: 39.95361°N 75.16299°W

- Established: 1731; 295 years ago
- Location: United States
- Region served: Pennsylvania
- Website: pagrandlodge.org

The Grand Lodge of Pennsylvania, officially The Right Worshipful Grand Lodge of the Most Ancient and Honorable Fraternity of Free and Accepted Masons of Pennsylvania and Masonic Jurisdictions Thereunto Belonging, sometimes referred to as Freemasons of Pennsylvania, is the premier masonic organization in the Commonwealth of Pennsylvania. The Grand Lodge claims to be the oldest in the United States, and the third-oldest in the world after England (est. 1717) and Ireland (est. 1725), having been originally established as the Provincial Grand Lodge of Pennsylvania in 1731. This claim is disputed by both the Grand Lodge of Massachusetts and the Grand Lodge of Virginia.

The Grand Lodge of Pennsylvania has the most number of members in the United States, claiming approximately 76,000 members at the end of 2023.

== History ==
=== Begininngs ===
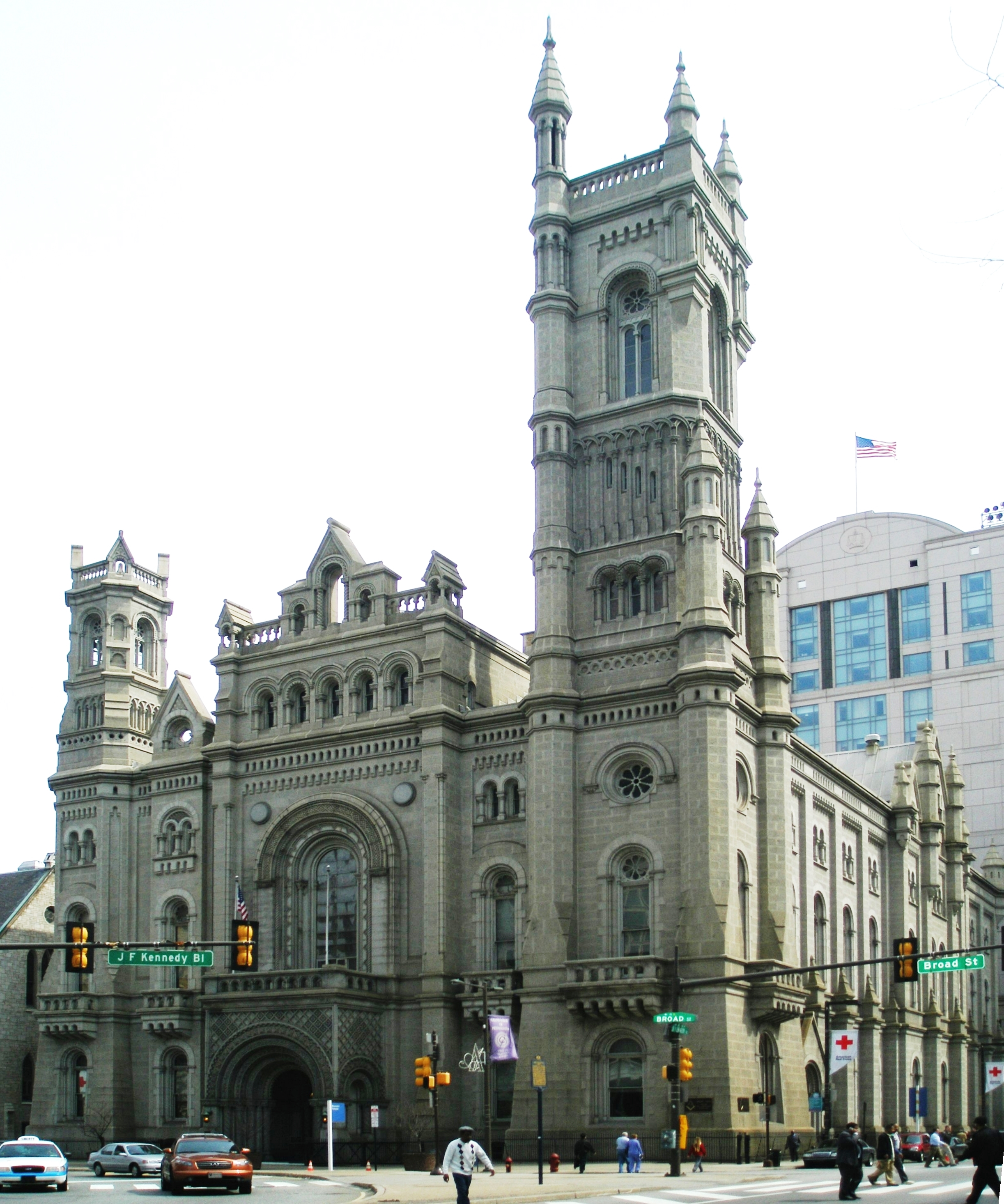
The Masonic Temple in Philadelphia in 1873; James H. Windrim was the building's architect.

The earliest minute book of any Masonic lodge on the North American continent is that for St. John's Lodge of the Moderns in Philadelphia which met at the Tun Tavern. The Tun Tavern was the first "brew house" in the city, being built in 1685, and was located on the waterfront at the corner of Water Street and Tun Alley. The extant records of the Lodge begin on 24 June 1731, but the lodge may have been older than that. It was reported by Benjamin Franklin, in his Gazette for 8 December 1730, that there were "several Lodges of Free Masons erected in this Province...." The Tun Tavern, being a popular meeting place in Philadelphia, was undoubtedly the first location of a lodge in Philadelphia.

According to Henry Coil, a Freemason from Massachusetts, the Tun Tavern Lodge was never warranted nor issued a charter, being an "immemorial rights lodge." However, the Librarian of the Masonic Library in Philadelphia believes that, simply because there is no existing evidence, there is no reason to assume that the Tun Tavern Lodge was never warranted since all of the other Lodges at the time had been.

Two English grand lodges erected lodges in Pennsylvania during the 18th century, the Premier Grand Lodge of England (known as the "Moderns"), established in London in 1717, and the Ancient Grand Lodge of England (known as the "Antients" or "Ancients"), established in London in 1751. The first of these, the Moderns' Grand Lodge, was first to establish lodges and provincial grand lodges in the American colonies.

=== Modern Grand Lodge ===
The first official act of the Moderns' Grand Lodge regarding the American colonies was the creation of a Provincial Grand Master for New York, New Jersey, and Pennsylvania, naming one Daniel Coxe, Esq., to that office. This deputation, issued on June 5, 1730, was made by the Grand Master, the Duke of Norfolk, and was to remain in effect for two years from 24 June 1731 to 24 June 1733, at which time, according to the deputation, the members were empowered to elect a Provincial Grand Master. From a letter in the possession of the New York Historical Society dated 31 July 1730 at Trenton we know that Daniel Coxe was already in the colonies. Coxe returned to England to attend a meeting of the Grand Lodge in London on 29 January 1731 where he was toasted as the Provincial Grand Master "of North America." Coxe eventually relocated in Burlington, New Jersey, about 20 miles from Philadelphia, where he had been awarded a colonial judgeship.

There are no explicit records to show that Daniel Coxe ever organized a Provincial Grand Lodge, nor to have erected any lodges, nor ever exercised his authority in any way as Provincial Grand Master prior to his death on April 25, 1739. In fact, his death, which was reported in the Pennsylvania Gazette by Benjamin Franklin, a member of The Tun Tavern Lodge in Philadelphia, does not even mention that Coxe was a Freemason, possibly indicating that Franklin and the other members of the Craft in Philadelphia were unaware of his affiliation. However, the Masonic historian Dr. Wilhelm Begeman points out that, "those who deny Coxe's activity must naturally assume the Provincial Grand Lodge established itself through its own power, which is much less probable than the legal action of Coxe... that his home was in Trenton, was no serious obstacle, for the London Grand Masters nearly all lived at a distance from London, Lord Kingston, for instance, in Ireland." An entry in "Liber B," the oldest known record of a lodge in the Americas (the second record book of St. John's Lodge, Philadelphia, from 1731 to 1738), lists William Allen as Grand Master on 24 June 1731. Coxe's deputation clearly allows for the election of a successor in perpetuity.

After his election in 1731, William Allen appointed William Pringle, Deputy Grand Master, and Thomas Boude and Benjamin Franklin, Wardens. Benjamin Franklin would become Provincial Grand Master in 1734—the same year he published Anderson's Constitutions, the first Masonic book printed in America—and again in 1749. The organization of the Provincial Grand Lodge of Pennsylvania was recorded in both "Liber B" and the Pennsylvania Gazette, which published the names of the sixteen Grand Masters who served from 1731 to 1755. William Allen was Provincial Grand Master eight times. No reports were sent from the Provincial Grand Lodge of Moderns to the Grand Lodge of England, nor were any requested; being independent it apparently had no need to do so. Yet, the Provincial Grand Lodge of Pennsylvania affiliated itself with the Grand Lodge of England in that it approved and adopted those Ritual changes made by the GLE after 1730.

On April 30, 1733, Henry Price of Boston was appointed Provincial Grand Master "of New England" by the Viscount Montagu, Grand Master of the Moderns' Grand Lodge in London. Clearly, this appointment would not have included Pennsylvania, except for Price's repeated, but disputed, claims that the Grand Master had "ordered him to extend Freemasonry over all North America." Price held this office until December 1736, when he was succeeded by Robert Tomlinson, also of Boston, who held the office until his death in 1740. Tomlinson was succeeded by Thomas Oxnard, who was deputized Provincial Grand Master "for North America" on 23 Sept. 1743. He remained in office until his death in 1754. Whether Price's office gave him jurisdiction over Pennsylvania Masonry has always been disputed, but the question, according to those who favor the supremacy of Massachusetts, became a moot point for a brief period with Oxnard's appointment over all of North America. Historians who argue in favor of Massachusetts' primacy over Pennsylvania also point to an appointment of Benjamin Franklin as Provincial Grand Master for Pennsylvania on 10 July 1749. They argue that Provincial Grand Masters had no authority to appoint other Provincial Grand Masters and Franklin's appointment was void since only grand lodges had authority to do so. However, Daniel Coxe's deputation from the Grand Lodge of England did in fact provide the Freemasons in Pennsylvania to elect a Provincial Grand Master every two years in perpetuity. Because of this we can assume that all successive Provincial Grand Masters of Pennsylvania were elected under the authority of this deputation.

The American Revolutionary War took a great toll on Pennsylvania Freemasonry, and especially the Moderns' lodges. Beginning before the War some of the Modern Lodges had switched allegiance to the Ancients, e.g. Lodge No. 4 of the Moderns. By the end of the Revolution nearly all the lodges in Pennsylvania owed allegiance to the Ancients. It is impossible to determine precisely when the Moderns' Provincial Grand Lodge folded, but it was gone by 1785. The Masonic Hall, built by the Moderns in 1755 was sold, and the proceeds were placed in a charitable trust and became the "Freemason's Fuel Fund." Thus, we can say that the "Modern" line was grafted onto the "Ancient."

But by 1785, the Moderns and their lodges had ceased to exist in Pennsylvania, the last of their members having been absorbed by the lodges of the Ancients. The present day Grand Lodge of Pennsylvania descends primarily from the Ancients, with the Moderns having been grafted onto "Ancient York Masonry."

=== The Ancient Provincial Grand Lodge of Pennsylvania ===
On July 15, 1761, the Ancient Grand Lodge of England issued a warrant for a Provincial Grand Lodge of Pennsylvania, which appeared as Lodge No. 89 on the Grand Lodge roster. Three years before, the Ancient Grand Lodge had issued a warrant for Lodge No. 69 to a lodge in Philadelphia (later Lodge No. 2 of the Grand Lodge of Pennsylvania), which had been the first warrant issued to a lodge in North America by that Grand Lodge. As noted above, in a process that began before the Revolutionary War, some Modern Lodges had defected to and were absorbed by the Ancient Provincial Grand Lodge thus making the Ancients the dominant form of Freemasonry in Pennsylvania.

By 1785, Pennsylvania Freemasonry was entirely Ancient, the Moderns having been fully absorbed into the Ancient Provincial Grand Lodge of Pennsylvania. On 25 September 1786, the Ancient Provincial Grand Lodge of Pennsylvania declared itself to be independent of the mother Grand Lodge and closed itself permanently as a provincial grand lodge. The following day, 26 September, the representatives of 13 Ancient lodges met together and reformed the independent Grand Lodge of Pennsylvania, headquartered in Philadelphia. Though Pennsylvania Masonic ritual is entirely from the Ancients, and not an amalgamation of the two rituals, the Moderns did not simply cease to exist but were rather absorbed into Ancient Masonry and made to conform to their customs and usages.

Since its inception, the Grand Lodge of Pennsylvania has moved its headquarters from building to building over the last two centuries, and on one occasion even conducted their meetings in Independence Hall in Philadelphia.

The first permanent Grand Lodge building was built on Chestnut Street in 1811, in the gothic revivalist style. However it burned down in 1819. A second grand lodge building was constructed in the 1850s, and was sold in 1873, upon completion of the current Masonic Temple in Philadelphia. This building has been the home of the Grand Lodge of Pennsylvania ever since.

== Charitable endeavors ==
The Grand Lodge of Pennsylvania (and its subordinate Lodges) support five charitable entities that offer a range of services.

=== Masonic Temple, Library, and Museum ===
The headquarters of the Grand Lodge is in the Masonic Temple at One North Broad Street, directly across from Philadelphia City Hall. Built in 1873, the library contains collections for the study of American history and Freemasonry, and displays more than 30,000 artifacts.

=== Masonic Villages of Pennsylvania ===
Since its founding in 1894, the Masonic Home of the Grand Lodge of Pennsylvania, now known as the Masonic Villages of Pennsylvania has grown and expanded. The 1400 acres of the Masonic Village at Elizabethtown Campus began as a working farm where the Residents participated in farming chores. Today the farming aspects have been reduced to a prize-winning stable of Bulls and an apple, peach, and cherry orchard. The Elizabethtown campus offers charitable services ranging from a children's home and child care center, to 445 beds of Nursing Home services and 971 units of Retirement living consisting of apartments and cottages.

Comprising five continuing care retirement communities across Pennsylvania providing a wide range of care and services, the Masonic Villages are committed to caring for residents regardless of their sex, race, creed, Masonic affiliation or ability to pay. The communities extend healthcare and outreach services to numerous others through home and community-based services.

=== Masonic Children's Home ===
The Masonic Children's Home is a home for children who come from various socio-economic environments that do not provide the security and support necessary for healthy growth and development. The youth receive food, clothing, complete medical care, academic tutoring and opportunities to participate in worship and extracurricular activities of their choosing.

=== Pennsylvania Masonic Youth Foundation ===
The Foundation offers leadership, education and mentoring programs and resources for youth throughout the Commonwealth, and provides numerous resources and opportunities for Masonic youth groups. It supports initiatives to keep children safe from violence, abuse and exploitation, and provides specialized training for adults who provide leadership to young people.

=== Masonic Charities Fund ===
This special fund supports operations and equipment purchases for The Masonic Library and Museum of Pennsylvania, as well as the restoration and preservation of the Masonic Temple. As needs present themselves, the fund supports scholarships and disaster relief across the globe, to Masonic or non-Masonic recipients.

== Grand Masters ==
In Pennsylvania, the Grand Master serves a two-year term. Notably, the regalia of the Grand Master is unlike that of any other Masonic Jurisdiction in the United States, in that the collar is made of velvet and contains no metal save for the bullion thread used to compose the stars. The apron is rounded, both at the base and on the flap, and has no excess ornamentation or fringe. The following men have served as Grand Master. Notable Grand Masters include:

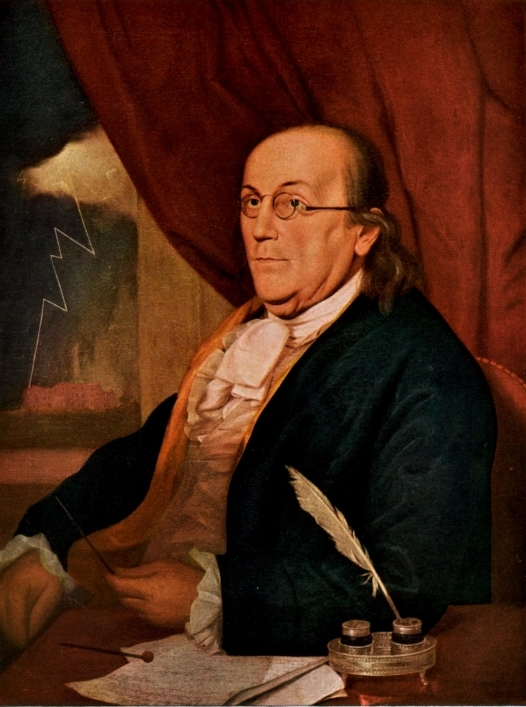
Benjamin Franklin, a Founding Father of the United States who played a leading role in the American Revolution, was an early Grand Master of Pennsylvania Freemasons.

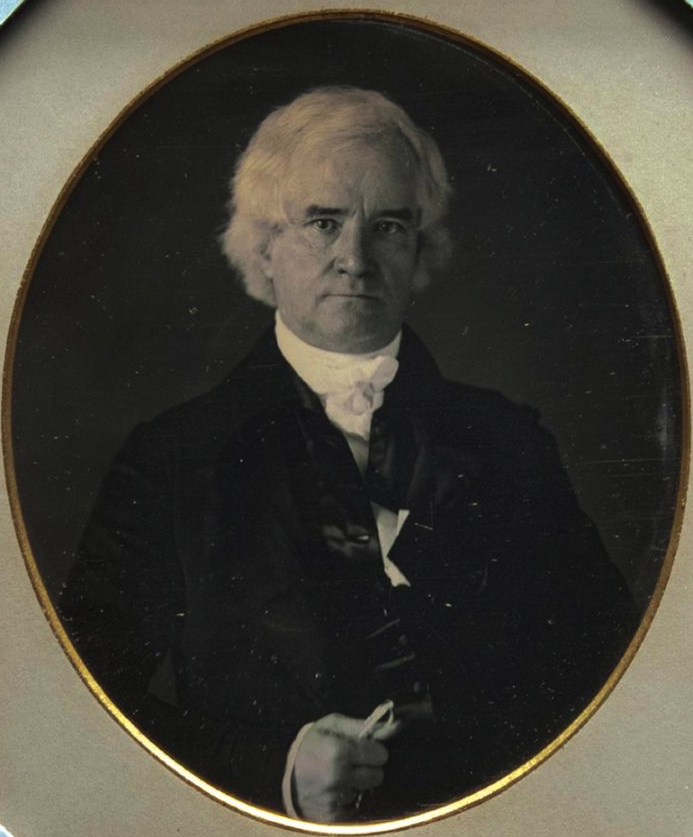
George M. Dallas, the 11th Vice President of the United States during the presidency of James K. Polk, was a Grand Master of Pennsylvania Freemasons.

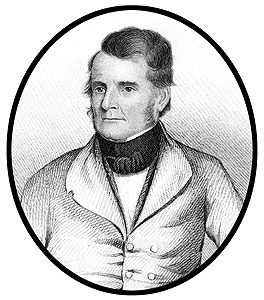
Joseph Ripley Chandler, the last American Ambassador to the Two Sicilies before Italian unification, was a Grand Master of Pennsylvania Freemasons.

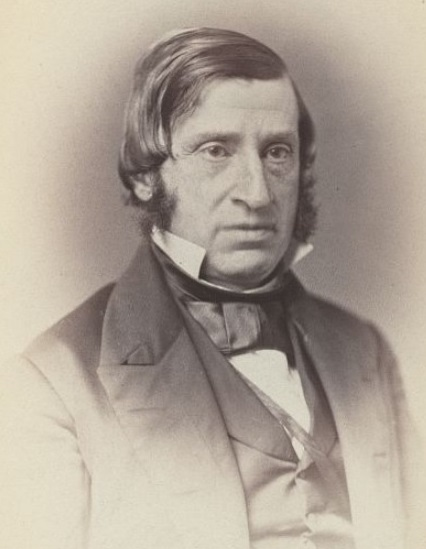
Henry Myer Phillips, a member of the U.S. House of Representatives and alumnus of the Franklin Institute was Grand Master of Pennsylvania.

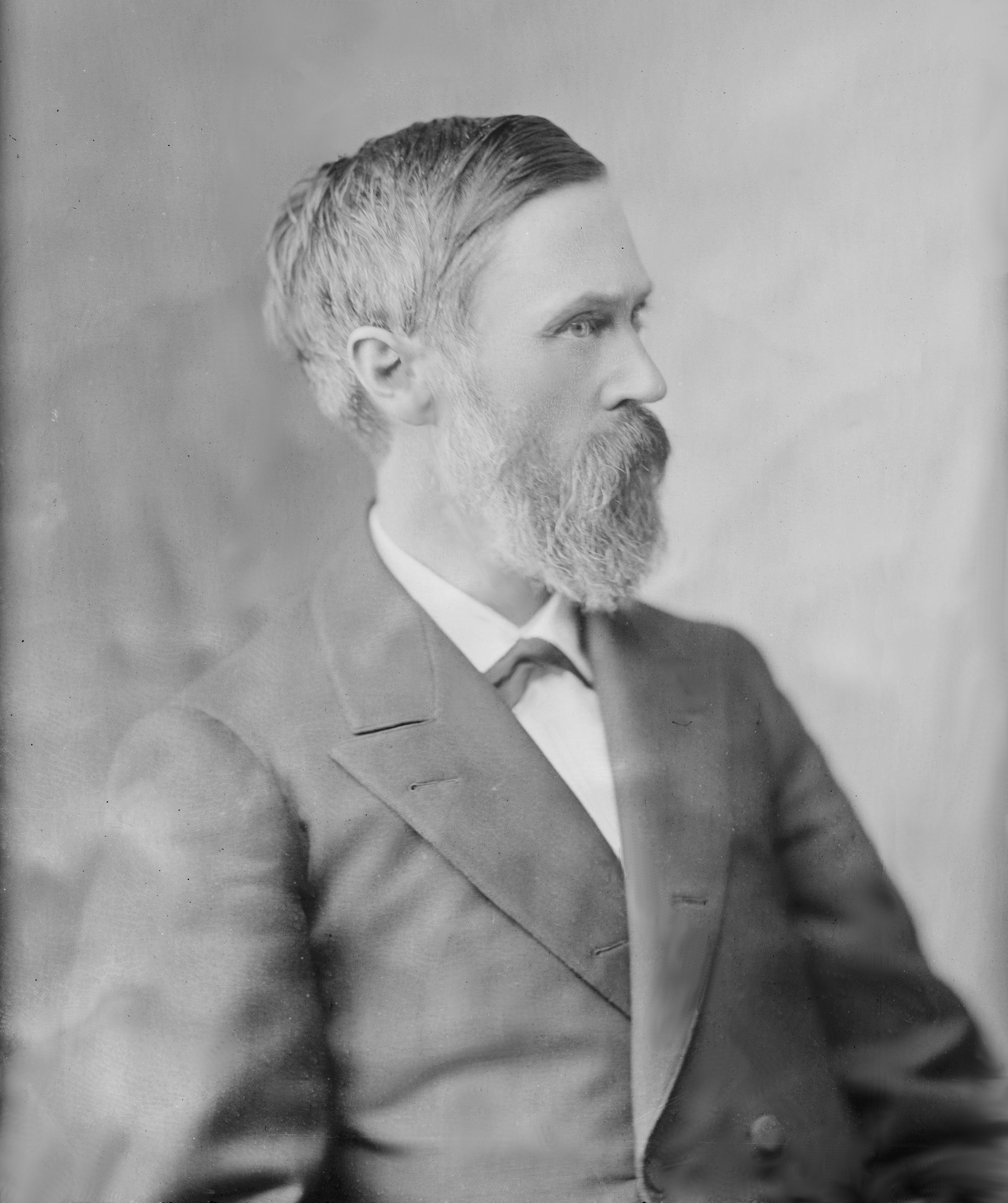
Samuel Bernard Dick, a member of the U.S. House of Representatives and a veteran of the American Civil War, was Grand Master of Pennsylvania Freemasons.] A native of Meadville, PA, he was the first member to hold that office who did not live in the Greater Philadelphia area.

- 1730–1731: Daniel Coxe
- 1731–1732: William Allen
- 1734: Benjamin Franklin
- 1735: James Hamilton
- 1736: Thomas Hopkinson
- 1737: William Plumstead
- 1741: Philip Syng
- 1789–1794: Jonathan B. Smith
- 1806–1813: James Milnor
- 1824: John B. Gibson
- 1825: James Harper
- 1826–1828: Thomas Kittera
- 1829–1830: Samuel Badger
- 1835: George M. Dallas
- 1837–1838: John M. Read
- 1841–1842: Joseph R. Chandler
- 1846–1847: James Page
- 1858: John Kearsley Mitchell
- 1859–1860: Henry M. Phillips
- 1868–1869: Richard Vaux
- 1881–1882: Samuel B. Dick
- 1885–1886: E. Coppée Mitchell
- 1891–1892: J. Simpson Africa
- 1899: Henry W. Williams
- 1904–1905: James W. Brown
- 1910–1911: George W. Guthrie
- 1916–1917: Louis A. Watres
- 1938–1939: Robert R. Lewis

== See also ==
- List of famous Freemasons
- List of Masonic libraries
- Masonic Lodge
