= Henry Warren Williams (1830–1899) =

Henry Warren Williams (July 30, 1830 – January 25, 1899) was an American jurist who was a justice of the Supreme Court of Pennsylvania from 1887 until his death in 1899.

== Early life ==
Williams was born on July 30, 1830, in Harford Township, Susquehanna County, Pennsylvania. He was the eldest of nine children. His father, Peter Williams, was a farmer and Henry spent his summers working on the farm. He began teaching at the age of fourteen and did so until he commenced his law studies. He graduated from the Franklin Academy and was accepted to Amherst College, but was unable to attend due to illness.

== Legal career ==
In January 1852, Williams studied law with E. B. Chase in Montrose Park, Pennsylvania. He then studied under his uncle, John W. Guernsey, in Tioga County, Pennsylvania. Williams was admitted to the Tioga County bar in January 1854 and began practicing in Wellsboro, Pennsylvania. He was admitted to practice before the Pennsylvania Supreme Court in 1855 and the federal district and circuit courts in 1856.

In March 1865, Williams was appointed an additional judge of the Fourth Judicial District, which consisted of Tioga, Potter, McKean, Elk, and Clearfield counties, by Governor Andrew Gregg Curtin. Williams was elected in November 1865 and elected president judge in 1871 and 1881. In 1874, redistricting added Cameron County and removed Elk and Clearfield counties from Williams' district. In 1876, he was appointed by Governor John F. Hartranft to serve on a commission that reviewed and recommended amendments to the Commonwealth's revised constitution.

In 1887, Williams was the Republican nominee for a seat on the Supreme Court of Pennsylvania. On August 10, 1887, he was appointed by Governor James A. Beaver to fill the vacancy caused by the death of Chief Justice Ulysses Mercur. That November, he was elected to a 21-year term. Williams was recommended by the majority of Pennsylvania's Congressional delegation to succeed Joseph P. Bradley on the Supreme Court of the United States following his death in 1892, but Williams did not push for the appointment.

== Personal life ==
On May 1, 1856, Williams married Sarah E. Nichols. They had one son and one daughter.

Williams was a supporter of the Temperance movement and involved in YMCA and Sunday school work. He was a delegate to the 1868 Republican National Convention. In 1877, he was a representative of the Presbyterian Church in the United States of America in the General Presbyterian Council in Edinburgh. In 1881, he was a vice president of the International Sunday School Association convention in Toronto. Williams was a member of the Ossea No. 317 Masonic Temple and was grand master of the Grand Lodge of Pennsylvania in 1899.

== Death ==
Williams died on January 25, 1899, at his apartment in the Continental Hotel in Philadelphia. His cause of death was reported to be "valvular disease and hypertrophy of the heart". Although Williams had suffered from cardiac issues for several years, his death was unexpected. He had presided over the inauguration of Governor William A. Stone eight days earlier.
