= John Price Jackson =

American engineer

John Price Jackson (27 September 1868, in Kennett Square – 2 April 1948) was an American electrical engineer and academic, civil servant and soldier.

John was born into a quaker family in Kennett Square, Pennsylvania. His parents were Josiah and Mary Price Jackson. His elder brother, Dugald C. Jackson, co-wrote some books with him and also had a career as an electrical engineer and academic.

When the Pennsylvania Department of Labor and Industry was founded by Governor John Kinley Tener, Jackson was appointed as the first Commissioner. He was subsequently confirmed in post by Governor Martin Grove Brumbaugh on 2 June 1917, but took a leave of absence from state office when he accepted a Commission in the US Army following the United States entry into the First World War.

Jackson served under Brigadier General Charles Gates Dawes in the office of the Chief Purchasing Agent for the American Expeditionary Forces (AEF). Dawes appointed him in February 1918 to head a labor bureau to coordinate hiring of civilian labor to support the AEF's logistical system in Europe.

== Works ==
- 1896 Alternating Currents and Alternating Current Machinery (with Dugald C. Jackson) New York: Macmillan Co.
- 1902 An Elementary Book on Electricity and Magnetism (with Dugald C. Jackson) New York: Macmillan Co.
- 1915 "Some Industrial Lessons of the European War", The Annals of the American Academy of Political and Social Science Volume: 61 issue: 1, page(s): 45–50, September 1915
