= Genevieve Blatt =

American politician and attorney

Judge of the Pennsylvania Commonwealth Court
- In office January 3, 1972 – December 31, 1993
- Preceded by: Louis Manderino
- Succeeded by: Sandra Schultz Newman

Secretary of Internal Affairs of Pennsylvania
- In office January 17, 1955 – January 16, 1967
- Governor: George Leader; David Lawrence; William Scranton
- Preceded by: William Livengood
- Succeeded by: John K. Tabor

Personal details
- Born: June 19, 1913 East Brady, Pennsylvania, U.S.
- Died: July 4, 1996 (aged 83) Hampden Township, Pennsylvania, U.S.
- Party: Democratic
- Education: University of Pittsburgh (BA, MA, JD)

Genevieve Blatt (June 19, 1913 – July 4, 1996) was an American politician and attorney from Pennsylvania. She became the first woman to hold statewide elected office in Pennsylvania when she was elected State Secretary of Internal Affairs in 1954, and she ran unsuccessfully as the Democratic Party nominee in the 1964 United States Senate election in Pennsylvania.

== Early life and education ==
A native of East Brady, Clarion County, Blatt received a B.A. from the University of Pittsburgh in 1933, and an M.A. from the school in 1934. She received a J.D. from Pittsburgh's law school in 1937. Blatt became secretary and chief examiner of the Pittsburgh Civil Service Commission in 1938, and went on to serve as an assistant city solicitor.

== Political career ==
Blatt became active in Democratic politics in the 1930s, beginning with her selection as a delegate to the 1936 Democratic National Convention, where she was the first delegate to vote for Roosevelt. She went on to attend every succeeding convention through 1972. Blatt later served on the National Committee's policy committee, and was vice chair of the Pennsylvania delegation to the 1956 convention.

She made her first run for elected office in 1950, when she unsuccessfully sought the office of State Auditor General. Four years later, she became the first woman to hold statewide elected office in Pennsylvania, when she was elected State Secretary of Internal Affairs. Blatt was re-elected in 1958 and 1962 but lost her bid for a fourth term in 1966, when she was narrowly defeated by Republican John K. Tabor. The office of Internal Affairs Secretary, which had long been considered for elimination, was dissolved in 1968.

In 1964, Blatt challenged incumbent Republican Senator Hugh Scott, who was seeking a second term. She narrowly defeated the 1950 nominee for Lieutenant Governor Michael Musmanno, by about 500 votes out of over 900,000 cast, in the Democratic primary. Scott, who five years later became the Senate Republican Leader, used a strong performance in the southeast corner of the state, including the suburban Philadelphia counties of Chester, Montgomery, Delaware and Bucks, to score a narrow victory in an otherwise bleak election cycle for state and national Republicans.

Following her defeat to Scott, Blatt remained active in State Democratic politics, and was elected to one of the state's slots on the Democratic National Committee from June 23, 1970, to May 25, 1972. She was preceded by Emma Guffey Miller and succeeded by Rita Wilson Kane. She resigned from the national committee in 1972, following her appointment to a seat on the Commonwealth Court by Governor Milton Shapp. Blatt served on the court until her retirement at the end of 1993, easily surviving multiple retention votes. One of her most notable rulings on the court was the establishment of the precedent that high school sports teams in Pennsylvania could no longer discriminate on the basis of gender.

== Death and legacy ==
Blatt died at a retirement home in Hampden Township in July 1996. The Genevieve Society, a non-partisan organization dedicated to increasing the political and professional power of women in Pennsylvania, is named in her honor.

Political offices
Preceded by William Livengood	Secretary of Internal Affairs of Pennsylvania; 1955–1967	Succeeded by John K. Tabor
Party political offices
Preceded by Ramsey S. Black	Democratic nominee for Pennsylvania Auditor General; 1952	Succeeded by Francis R. Smith
Preceded by Frank W. Ruth	Democratic nominee for Secretary of Internal Affairs of Pennsylvania; 1954, 1958, 1962, 1966	Succeeded by None
Preceded by George Leader	Democratic nominee for U.S. Senator from Pennsylvania (Class 1); 1964	Succeeded by William Sesler
Legal offices
Preceded by Louis Manderino	Judge of the Pennsylvania Commonwealth Court; 1972–1993	Succeeded by Sandra Schultz Newman
