= James W. Latta =

American military officer and politician (1839–1922)

Secretary of Internal Affairs of Pennsylvania
- In office 1895–1903
- Preceded by: Isaac B. Brown
- Succeeded by: Isaac B. Brown

Adjutant General of Pennsylvania
- In office 1873–1883
- Preceded by: Alexander L. Russell
- Succeeded by: Presley N. Guthrie

Personal details
- Born: April 19, 1839 Philadelphia, Pennsylvania
- Died: March 26, 1922 (aged 82) Philadelphia, Pennsylvania
- Party: Republican

Military service
- Allegiance: United States
- Branch/service: Union Army; Pennsylvania National Guard
- Years of service: 1861–1862 (National Guard); 1862–1866 (Army); 1866–1883 (National Guard)
- Rank: Brigadier general
- Battles/wars: American Civil War; Fredericksburg; Salem Church; Gettysburg; Rappahannock Station; Mine Run; Wilderness; Spotsylvania Court House; Cold Harbor; Fort Stevens; Winchester; Ebenezer Church; Columbus

James William Latta (April 19, 1839 – March 26, 1922) was an American military officer and politician who was the Adjutant General of Pennsylvania from 1873 to 1883 and the Secretary of Internal Affairs of Pennsylvania from 1895 to 1903.

== Early life ==
Latta was born on April 19, 1839 in Philadelphia. He graduated from Central High School in 1856 and after a brief stint as a clerk for the Western Insurance Company, studied law under his father, John E. Latta, who was then associated with William L. Pierce. Latta was admitted to the bar on his 21st birthday.

== Military service ==
=== Civil War ===
Latta enlisted as a private in Company D of the Gray Reserves on April 19, 1861. He was made a second lieutenant in the 119th Pennsylvania Infantry Regiment on August 4, 1862 and promoted to first lieutenant on September 1, 1862. He was made captain of Company B on March 4, 1864. That same year, he was one of two officers recommended by Major general John Sedgwick for vacancies in the adjutant general's department. In May 1864, he was commissioned a captain and assistant adjutant general and assigned to the 1st Division of the VI Corps. He participated in the battles of Fredericksburg, Salem Church, Gettysburg, Rappahannock Station, Mine Run, Wilderness, Spotsylvania Court House, Cold Harbor, Fort Stevens, and Winchester. He was breveted to the rank of Major of "gallantry at the battle of Winchester, Virginia, and for habitual good conduct and deportment on all the battlefields in the campaign before Richmond".

Prior to the Third Battle of Petersburg, he was ordered to report to the Military Division of the Mississippi and was assigned to the 4th Division of the Cavalry Corps under Emory Upton. With this corps, Latta participated in the battles of Ebenezer Church and Columbus and received a second brevet to Lieutenant colonel. At the close of the war, he followed Upton to the military district of Colorado. He was mustered out in January 1866 and appointed a lieutenant in the 6th Infantry Regiment, but he declined and returned to the practice of law.

=== Pennsylvania National Guard ===
Upon returning to Philadelphia, Latta reenlisted in the Gray Reserves, rising to the rank of colonel. In 1873, he was appointed Adjutant General of Pennsylvania. After taking office, he reorganized the Pennsylvania National Guard – reducing the number of divisions and eliminating mediocre companies, and instituted frequent and rigid inspections.

During the Pittsburgh railroad strike of 1877, Latta was given the authority to act on behalf of the Governor John F. Hartranft, who was out of state. Local militia commander Alfred L. Pearson informed Latta that many of his men had sided with the strikers, so Latta ordered 600 guardsmen from Philadelphia under the command of Robert M. Brinton. On July 21, 1877, Latta ordered Briton's men to disperse a crowd gathered at the 28th Street crossing. The militia was stoned and taunted by the mob, then fired upon. Returning fire, they killed an estimated 20 men, women and children, and wounded another 29. This led to a riot that saw strikers burn 39 buildings, 104 locomotives, 46–66 passenger cars, and 1,200–1,383 freight cars., 53 rioters and eight soldiers were killed in the violence.

Latta was retained by Hartranft's successor, Henry M. Hoyt, but was succeeded by Presley N. Guthrie when Democrat Robert E. Pattison took office in 1883.

== Politics ==
Latta was the first secretary of the Philadelphia Civil Service Board. In 1889, he was elected clerk of the quarter sessions of Philadelphia County. He was reelected in 1892. In 1894, he was elected Secretary of Internal Affairs of Pennsylvania. He was elected to a second term in 1898 and left office in 1903.

Latta died on March 26, 1922 at his home in Philadelphia.
