= Richard H. Lansburgh =

American economist

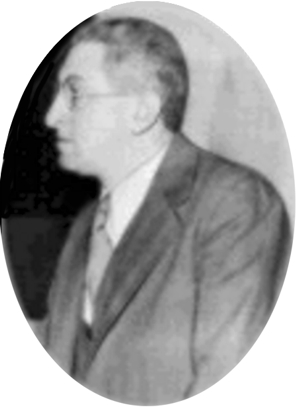
Richard H. Lansburgh (1893–1942)

Richard Hines Lansburgh (September 26, 1893 - 1942) was an American economist, management consultant, and Professor of Industry at the University of Pennsylvania's Wharton School, known for his work in the field of industrial management.

== Biography ==
Lansburgh was born and raised in Washington, D.C., and studied economics at the University of Pennsylvania. There in 1915 he obtained his Bsc in economics, and in 1916 his MA, and in 1918 his PhD in Political Economy with a thesis entitled "Labor turnover."

In 1915 Lansburgh had started his life-long academic career at the Wharton School of the University of Pennsylvania, only interrupted by World War I. From 1917 to 1919 he served in the Ordnance Corps of the United States Army. He started out as First Lieutenant, and got promoted to the rank of Captain and of Major. Back at the Wharton School he was assistant professor from 1919 to 1921, and Professor of Industry until his retirement in the late 1930s.

Furthermore, Lansburgh served as director of the Pennsylvania Economy League of Southwestern Pennsylvania; as Secretary at the Labor and Industry Commonwealth of Pennsylvania since his appointment by Gifford Pinchot in 1924; as Industrial Officer; at the First National Bank of Detroit, management consultant and management author.

== Work ==
Lansburgh is particularly known for his seminal work in industrial engineering, particularly with the publication of his 1923 book Industrial Management. The text is designed not to make any original contribution, but to create an overview of the field. In the introduction to the 3rd edition he explained the work as:

"... A conscious effort has been made to present what appears to the authors to be a sound philosophy of management, which may be summarized as a balanced relationship between the equities of the consumer, labor, owners of capital, management, and organized society or government. Any deviation from this approach has been a question of interpretation, not intent."

The work itself consists of seven parts.

== Reception ==
The author of Yardsticks of Management (1946) remembered Lansburgh for his outstanding opinion about those matters. Lansburgh in 1930 had argued:

"Is there a definite policy for the maintenance of the skill and good-will of the workers? Fine! But we must be much more definite. I went in a plant two weeks ago and got a new figure for maximum labor turnover. This company had been turning its entire working force over 100 per-cent each month for a period of a year. They had a 1200 per-cent turnover per annum, and some folks were wondering why they had not been more successful. That, or the conditions which caused it, is much more deeply rooted than an attempt to maintain the good-will of the workers. For one thing, that company probably holds the world's record for rate-cutting. I asked the general superintendent if they ever changed rates and got this reply: "Oh, yes, we are changing rates all the time. Whenever a man gets more than we think he should, we cut his rate." He told me that as though it would demonstrate to me how good he was. All these very fundamental things are the things you have to know. Of course, good-will will spring out of these fundamentals, and I assume that was implied. I am just trying to show you the things I feel you have to know in detail if you are going to establish any sort of a balance sheet of management..."

== Selected publications ==
- Lansburgh, Richard Hines. Industrial Management. John Wiley & Sons, Incorporated, 1923; 2nd revision ed, 1928; 3rd ed. with William R. Spriegel, 1940.

Articles, a selection

- Lansburgh, Richard H. "Industrial Fact: Finding as a Function of Government." Proceedings of the Academy of Political Science 13.1 (1928): pages 14–19. JSTOR 1172429
- Lansburgh, Richard H. "Recent Migrations of Industries in the United States." The Annals of the American Academy of Political and Social Science 142.1 (1929): pages 296–301. JSTOR 1016647
- Lansburgh, Richard H. "United States Department of Commerce Standards Yearbook, 1929". Pages vi, 401. The Annals of the American Academy of Political and Social Science 145.1 (1929): page 211.
