= 1964 United States Senate election in Pennsylvania =

- November 3, 1964
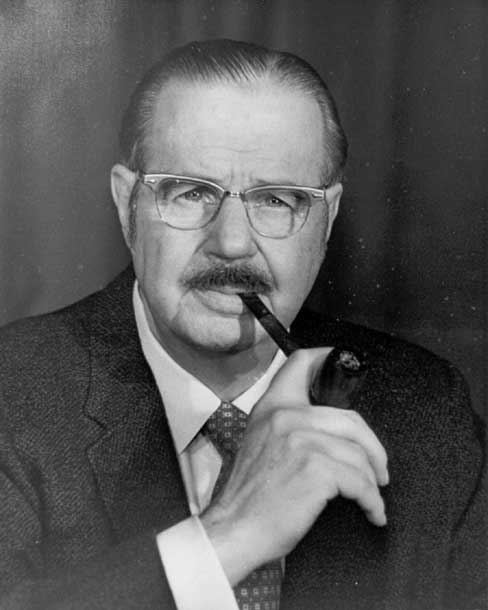

| Nominee | Hugh Scott | Genevieve Blatt |
| Party | Republican | Democratic |
| Popular vote | 2,429,858 | 2,359,223 |
| Percentage | 50.59% | 49.12% |
- County results Scott: 50–60% 60–70% 80–90% Blatt: 50–60%
U.S. senator before election
Hugh Scott
Republican
Elected U.S. Senator
Hugh Scott
Republican

The 1964 United States Senate election in Pennsylvania was held on November 3, 1964. Incumbent Republican U.S. Senator Hugh Scott successfully sought re-election to another term, defeating Democratic nominee Genevieve Blatt.

As of 2023, this is the last Senate election where York County voted Democratic.

== Democratic primary ==
=== Candidates ===
- Genevieve Blatt, Pennsylvania Secretary of Internal Affairs
- Michael Musmanno, Justice of the Supreme Court of Pennsylvania since 1952
- David B. Roberts

== General election ==
=== Candidates ===
- Genevieve Blatt, Pennsylvania Secretary of Internal Affairs (Democratic)
- Morris Chertov (Socialist Workers)
- Hugh Scott, incumbent U.S. Senator (Republican)
- George S. Taylor (Socialist Labor)

=== Results ===
General election results
| Party | Candidate | Votes | % | ±% |
|---|---|---|---|---|
| Republican | Hugh Scott (inc.) | 2,429,858 | 50.59% | −0.62% |
| Democratic | Genevieve Blatt | 2,359,223 | 49.12% | +0.74% |
| Socialist Workers | Morris Chertov | 7,317 | 0.15% | +0.01% |
| Socialist Labor | George S. Taylor | 6,881 | 0.14% | −0.12% |
| N/A | Other | 473 | 0.00% | N/A |
| Total votes | | 4,803,752 | 100.00% | |
| Republican hold | | | | |

== See also ==
- United States Senate elections, 1964
