= Secretary of Internal Affairs of Pennsylvania =

The secretary of internal affairs of Pennsylvania was a constitutional officer of the Commonwealth of Pennsylvania from 1875 until 1968. The position was created in the Pennsylvania Constitution of 1874, and was elected statewide every four years until 1966. The position was repealed on May 16, 1967. The secretary's duties were described as follows:

The Secretary of Internal Affairs shall exercise all of the powers and perform all the duties of the Surveyor General, subject to such changes as shall be made by law. His department shall embrace a bureau of industrial statistics, and he shall discharge such duties relating to corporations, to the charitable institutions, the agricultural, manufacturing, mining, mineral, timber and other material or business interests of the State as may be prescribed by law. He shall annually, and at such other times as may be required by law, make report to the General Assembly.

== List of secretaries ==
Name	Party	Took office	Left office
William McCandless	D	May 4, 1875	May 5, 1879
Aaron K. Dunkle	R	May 6, 1879	April 30, 1883
J. Simpson Africa	D	May 1, 1883	May 1887
Thomas J. Stewart	R	May 1887	January 16, 1895
Isaac B. Brown	R	January 16, 1895	May 1895
James W. Latta	R	May 1895	May 1903
Isaac B. Brown	R	May 1903	May 1907
Henry Houck	R	May 1907	March 13, 1917
Paul W. Houck	R	June 28, 1917	May 6, 1919
James F. Woodward	R	May 7, 1919	May 1931
Philip H. Dewey	R	May 1931	May 1935
Thomas A. Logue	D	May 1935	May 1939
William S. Livengood	R	May 1939	January 17, 1955
Genevieve Blatt	D	January 17, 1955	January 16, 1967
John K. Tabor	R	January 16, 1967	1968
