= Thomas J. Stewart =

American military officer and politician (1848–1917)

Adjutant General of Pennsylvania
- In office 1895–1917
- Preceded by: Walter W. Greenland
- Succeeded by: Frank D. Beary

Secretary of Internal Affairs of Pennsylvania
- In office 1887–1895
- Preceded by: J. Simpson Africa
- Succeeded by: Isaac B. Brown

Personal details
- Born: September 11, 1848 near Belfast, Ireland
- Died: September 11, 1917 (aged 69) Harrisburg, Pennsylvania, U.S.
- Party: Republican
- Education: Quaker City Business College

Military service
- Allegiance: United States
- Branch/service: Union Army; Pennsylvania National Guard
- Years of service: 1865 (Army); 1869–1917 (National Guard)
- Rank: Brigadier general
- Battles/wars: American Civil War; Third Battle of Petersburg; Battle of Sailor's Creek; Spanish–American War

Thomas Jameson Stewart (September 11, 1848 – September 11, 1917) was an Irish-born American politician and military officer who served as Secretary of Internal Affairs of Pennsylvania from 1887 to 1895 and Adjutant General of Pennsylvania from 1895 until his death in 1917.

== Early life ==
Stewart was born September 11, 1848 near Belfast. His family immigrated to Pennsylvania in 1849. He attended public schools in Norristown, Pennsylvania until he was fifteen. At the age of sixteen, he enlisted in the 138th Pennsylvania Infantry Regiment and served during the final months of the American Civil War. He participated in the Third Battle of Petersburg and the Battle of Sailor's Creek. He was honorably discharged on June 23, 1865. In 1867, Stewart graduated from Quaker City Business College and worked as an clerk and bookkeeper. In 1868, he opened a writing school in Norristown. From 1872 to 1885, he was secretary and treasurer for the Waterford Glass Company.

== Politics ==
Stewart represented Montgomery County in the Pennsylvania House of Representatives from 1885 to 1886. He served on the committee that found the location for and established the Pennsylvania Soldiers' and Sailors' Home. Stewart served as a trustee of the Home and from 1889 to 1896 was a trustee of Pennsylvania's Soldiers' Orphan Schools.

Stewart was elected Secretary of Internal Affairs of Pennsylvania in 1886 and reelected in 1890. He withdrew from the 1894 election before the Republican convention. He resigned before the end of his final term to become Adjutant General.

== Pennsylvania National Guard ==
Stewart joined the Pennsylvania National Guard's Norris City Rifles in 1869. He rose through the ranks, becoming adjutant of the sixth regiment infantry in 1879 and assistant adjutant general of the first brigade in 1890. On January 15, 1895, he was appointed Adjutant General of Pennsylvania by Governor Daniel H. Hastings. He was reappointed by Governors William A. Stone, Samuel W. Pennypacker, Edwin Sydney Stuart, John K. Tener, and Martin Grove Brumbaugh. Stewart commanded the guard during the Spanish–American War.

== Fraternal organizations ==
In 1890, Stewart became a department commander of the Grand Army of the Republic. From 1895 to 1907, he was assistant adjutant general of the GAR's department of Pennsylvania. He was adjutant general of the national GAR from 1898 to 1900 and commander in chief of the national Grand Army of the Republic from 1902 to 1903.

Stewart was made a master mason in 1892 and had the degrees of the Scottish Rite conferred upon him in 1897. He received the final (33rd) degree of the rite on September 17, 1907.

From 1906 to 1908, Stewart was president of the Friendly Sons of St. Patrick.

== Death and honors ==
Stewart died suddenly of heart disease on his 69th birthday. His death was blamed on overwork in preparation for the American entry into World War I.

In 1918, a bronze statue of Stewart made by J. Otto Schweizer was placed in the rotunda of the Pennsylvania State Capitol. Thomas J. Stewart Junior High School and Gen. Thomas J. Stewart Memorial Armory in Norristown were named for Stewart. The Thomas J. Stewart Medal is awarded to members of the Pennsylvania National Guard "for one hundred percent attendance and excellence in drill, including annual field training, during any one year."
