= Clifford L. Jones =

American politician (1927–2008)

Clifford Jones

Pennsylvania Secretary of Environmental Resources
- In office 1979–1981
- Governor: Dick Thornburgh
- Preceded by: Maurice K. Goddard
- Succeeded by: Peter Duncan

Chairman of the Republican State Committee of Pennsylvania
- In office 1970–1974
- Preceded by: John C. Jordan
- Succeeded by: Richard Frame

Pennsylvania Secretary of Labor and Industry
- In office 1969–1970
- Governor: Raymond P. Shafer
- Preceded by: John K. Tabor
- Succeeded by: Theodore R. Robb

Pennsylvania Secretary of Commerce
- In office 1967–1969
- Governor: Raymond P. Shafer
- Preceded by: John K. Tabor
- Succeeded by: Robert Mumma

Personal details
- Born: December 31, 1927 Sharon, Pennsylvania
- Died: May 7, 2008 (aged 80) Hampden Township, Pennsylvania
- Party: Republican
- Education: Westminster College

Clifford L. Jones (December 31, 1927 – May 7, 2008) was an American politician and Republican State Committee of Pennsylvania chairman. During his career he worked as secretary of commerce, labor and industry and environmental resources, and also chaired the Pennsylvania Public Utility Commission.

== Early life ==
A native of Sharon, Pennsylvania, Jones graduated from Westminster College and served in the United States Army from 1946 to 1947. In 1951, he became an executive for the Boy Scouts of America council in Lawrence County, Pennsylvania. From 1953 to 1957, he was executive manager of the Dover, Ohio chamber of commerce. In 1957, he moved to Hazleton, Pennsylvania and became director of the city's chamber of commerce and the Hazleton Industrial Development Corporation.

== Government service ==
In 1963, Jones was appointed Pennsylvania's deputy secretary of commerce. He also served as executive director of the Pennsylvania Industrial Development Authority and worked on issues related to the closure of Olmstead Air Force Base and the U.S. Steel plant in Donora, Pennsylvania. In December 1962, it was announced that Jones would serve as secretary of commerce in the administration of Governor-elect Raymond P. Shafer. In 1969, he was transferred to the position of secretary of labor and industry.

== Party chairmanship ==
Jones resigned on June 8, 1970, to chair the Broderick–Scalera campaign in that year's gubernatorial election. Broderick also backed Jones for the position of Pennsylvania Republican Party chairman after John C. Jordan resigned to take a position in the Nixon administration. Jones was elected without opposition on June 9, 1970. Jones resigned in 1974 to allow the state committee and the party's gubernatorial nominee to select new leadership well ahead of that year's elections. After stepping down, Jones headed Pennsylvanians for Effective Government, a business-oriented lobbying group.

== Return to government service ==
In 1979, Jones was appointed secretary of environmental resources by Governor Dick Thornburgh. His appointment was opposed by environmentalists due to his pro-business background. One in office though, Jones was opposed by business interests, especially coal mine operators, for his enforcement of clean air and water laws. In 1981, Jones was appointed to a 10-year term on the public utility commission.

== Later life ==
In 1983, Jones resigned from PUC to become president of the Pennsylvania Chamber of Business and Industry, a position he held for nearly a decade. He also served as acting president of the Capital Region Economic Development Corporation and chairman of the Hawk Mountain Sanctuary. He helped found the Whitaker Center for Science and the Arts and the Harrisburg University of Science and Technology. On May 7, 2008, he died of prostate cancer in Hampden Township, Pennsylvania.
