= Stephen Schmerin =

Stephen M. Schmerin

Secretary of the Pennsylvania Department of Labor and Industry
- In office 2003–2008

Personal details
- Party: Democratic

Stephen M. Schmerin is a former Secretary of the Pennsylvania Department of Labor and Industry, a cabinet-level department in the Government of Pennsylvania. He resigned in 2008.
