= Pennsylvania National Guard =

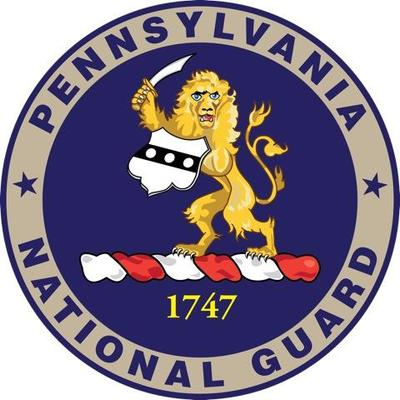
- Active: As militia: 1747–1870; As reserve: 1870–present
- Country: United States
- Allegiance: Pennsylvania
- Branch: United States Army; U.S. Air Force
- Type: Military reserve force, organized militia
- Role: "To meet commonwealth and federal mission responsibilities."
- Size: Full time: 3,500; Part time: 15,500
- Part of: National Guard; National Guard Bureau; Pennsylvania Department of Military and Veterans Affairs
- Garrison/HQ: Fort Indiantown Gap
- Motto: "Civilian in peace. Soldier in war."
- Website: www.pa.ng.mil

Commanders
- Commander in Chief (Title 10 USC): President of the United States (when federalized)
- Commander in Chief (Title 32 USC): Governor of Pennsylvania
- Adjutant General: Major General John R. Pippy

The Pennsylvania National Guard is one of the oldest and largest National Guards in the United States Department of Defense. It traces its roots to 1747 when Benjamin Franklin established the Associators in Philadelphia.

With more than 18,000 personnel, the Pennsylvania National Guard is the second-largest of all of the state National Guards. It has the second-largest Army National Guard and the fourth-largest Air National Guard. These forces are respective components of the United States Army and Air Force.

The Pennsylvania National Guard is also part of the Pennsylvania Department of Military and Veterans Affairs, which is headed by Pennsylvania Adjutant General Major General John Pippy. It is headquartered at Fort Indiantown Gap in Lebanon County, Pennsylvania and has facilities in more than eighty locations across the state.

== History ==
=== 18th century ===
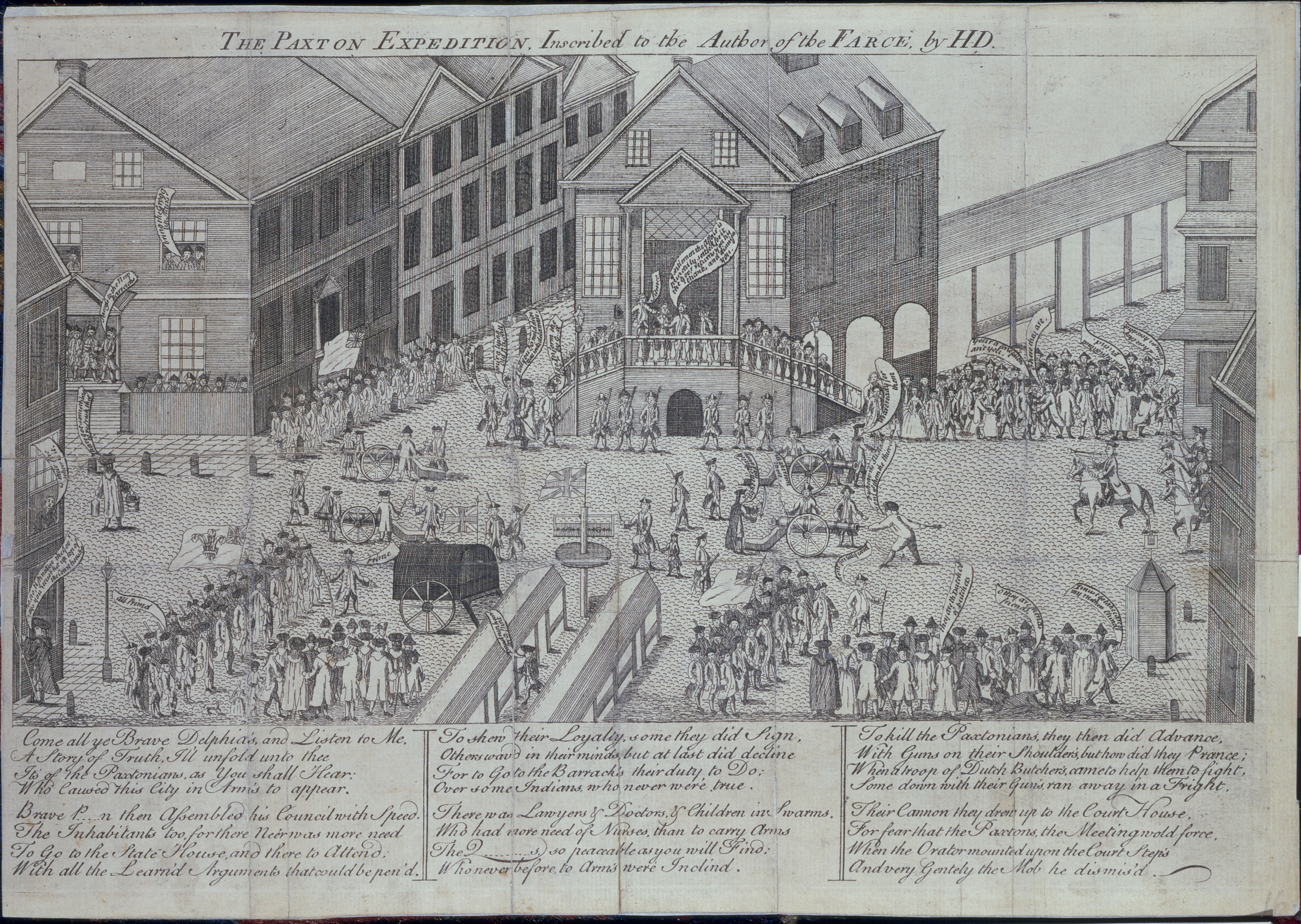
A 1764 illustration of the Pennsylvania Associators assembling in Philadelphia after news of the Paxton Boys marching on the city

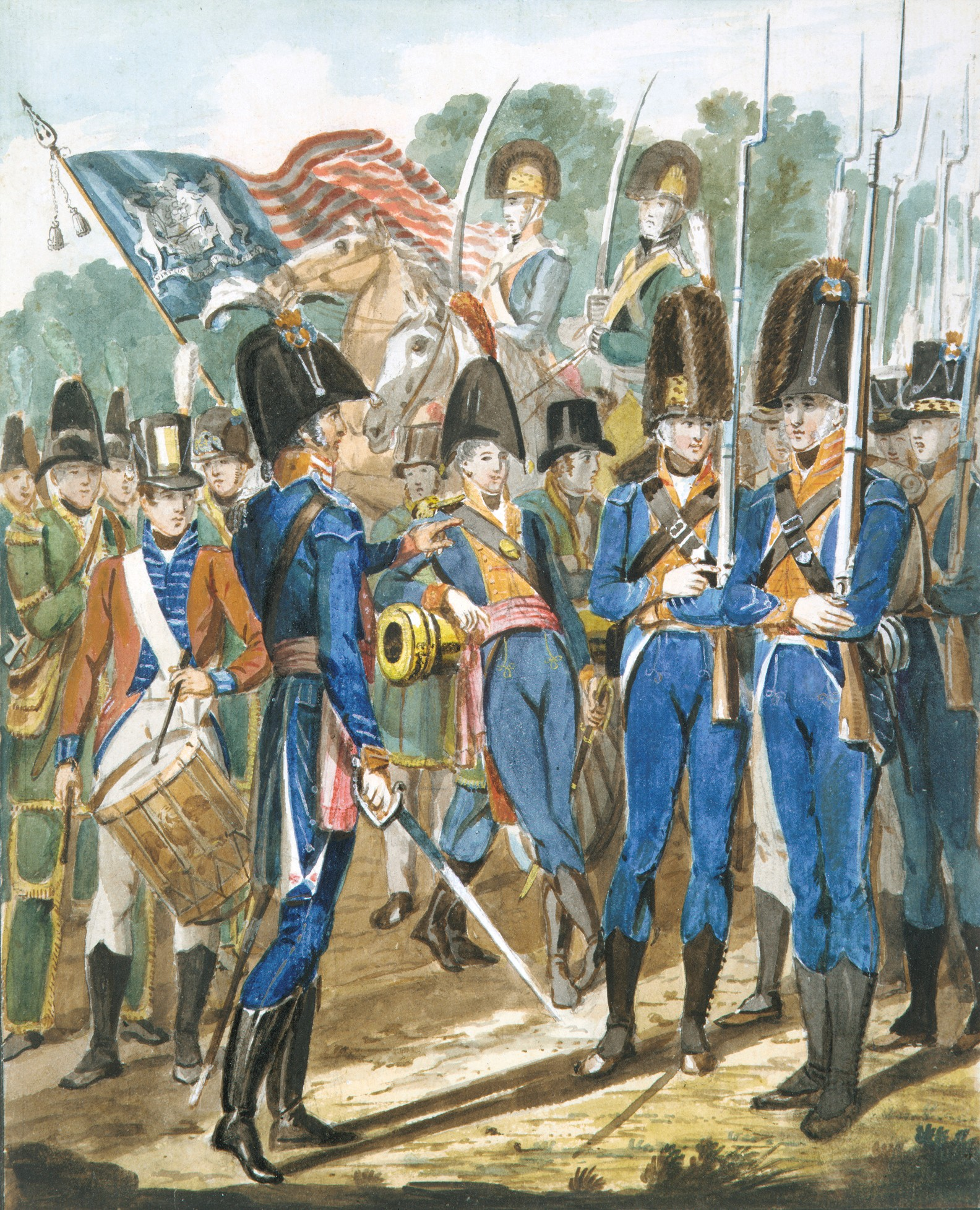
An 1812 illustration of the First Troop Philadelphia City Cavalry by John Lewis Krimmel

The Pennsylvania National Guard dates back to 1747 when Ben Franklin created the Associators in Philadelphia. Having overcome the long pacifist tradition of Pennsylvania's founding Quakers, Benjamin Franklin lead approximately 600 "gentlemen and merchants" of Philadelphia in signing the Articles of Association to provide for a common defense against Indian raiders and French privateers. These "Associators" (today's 111th Infantry Regiment and 103rd Brigade Engineer Battalion) are recognized as the foundation of the Pennsylvania National Guard. Within months, the Philadelphia Associators had brother units throughout the commonwealth. In 1755, the Pennsylvania Assembly passed the first Militia Act, formally authorizing a volunteer militia.

Shortly after the start of the American Revolutionary War, the First Troop, Philadelphia City Cavalry escorted General George Washington to New York to take command of the Continental Army after it was created by an act of the Second Continental Congress on June 14, 1775. The Army's first units included a regiment of rifle companies from Pennsylvania. During the American Revolution, Pennsylvania supplied 6,000 troops—4,500 of them Associators—for military operations in New York. In all, tens of thousands of Pennsylvania soldiers were called to service over the next seven years. On March 8, 1782, a group of Pennsylvania Militamen led by Captain David Williamson massacred 96 Christian Native-Americans in the Gnadenhutten Massacre.

After the American Revolution, the nation was put to the test when the militia in the Commonwealth of Pennsylvania was called upon to put down fellow citizens in the western part of the state during the Whiskey Rebellion. More than 4,000 militiamen from Pennsylvania served.

=== 19th century ===
During the War of 1812, Pennsylvania forces again volunteered to defend the nation and the Commonwealth. Altogether, more than 14,000 Pennsylvanians actively served. During the Battle of Lake Erie, an artillery company provided volunteers to serve as cannoneers on Commodore Perry's fleet. That unit is known today as Wilkes-Barre's 109th Field Artillery Regiment. Future president James Buchanan was a private in the Pennsylvania militia during the defense of Baltimore.

During the Mexican War, Pennsylvania provided two regiments of volunteer militiamen from across the Commonwealth. Many of these companies that answered the call were already formed from existing regiments within Pennsylvania's militia structure.

During the Civil War, after President Abraham Lincoln called for 75,000 volunteers to fight for the union, five units from the Lehigh Valley and Lewistown (Logan Guards) were quickly assembled and sent for protection. Lincoln called them “The First Defenders.” These units, from the Lehigh Valley, are the predecessors of today's 213th Regional Support Group (RSG) based out of Allentown. More than 200 Pennsylvania Regiments took part in the American Civil War in 24 major campaigns.

On April 7, 1870, the term “militia” was replaced with the “National Guard of Pennsylvania." John Oppell Foering wrote, "Without question [the Washington Grays (Philadelphia)] have been the parent and pattern of the militia of the City and State, as well as the foundation upon which was erected the magnificent National Guard of Pennsylvania if not of the entire country."

In 1877, thousands of Pennsylvania Guardsman were called up to restore order during the Railroad Strike of 1877. The rioting was worst in Pittsburgh. Five Guardsman and 20 civilians were killed in the violence.

In 1898, the entire Pennsylvania division was mobilized and mustered into federal service at Mount Gretna for the Spanish-American War. Pennsylvania Guard units saw action in Puerto Rico and the Philippines.

=== 20th century ===
==== World War I ====
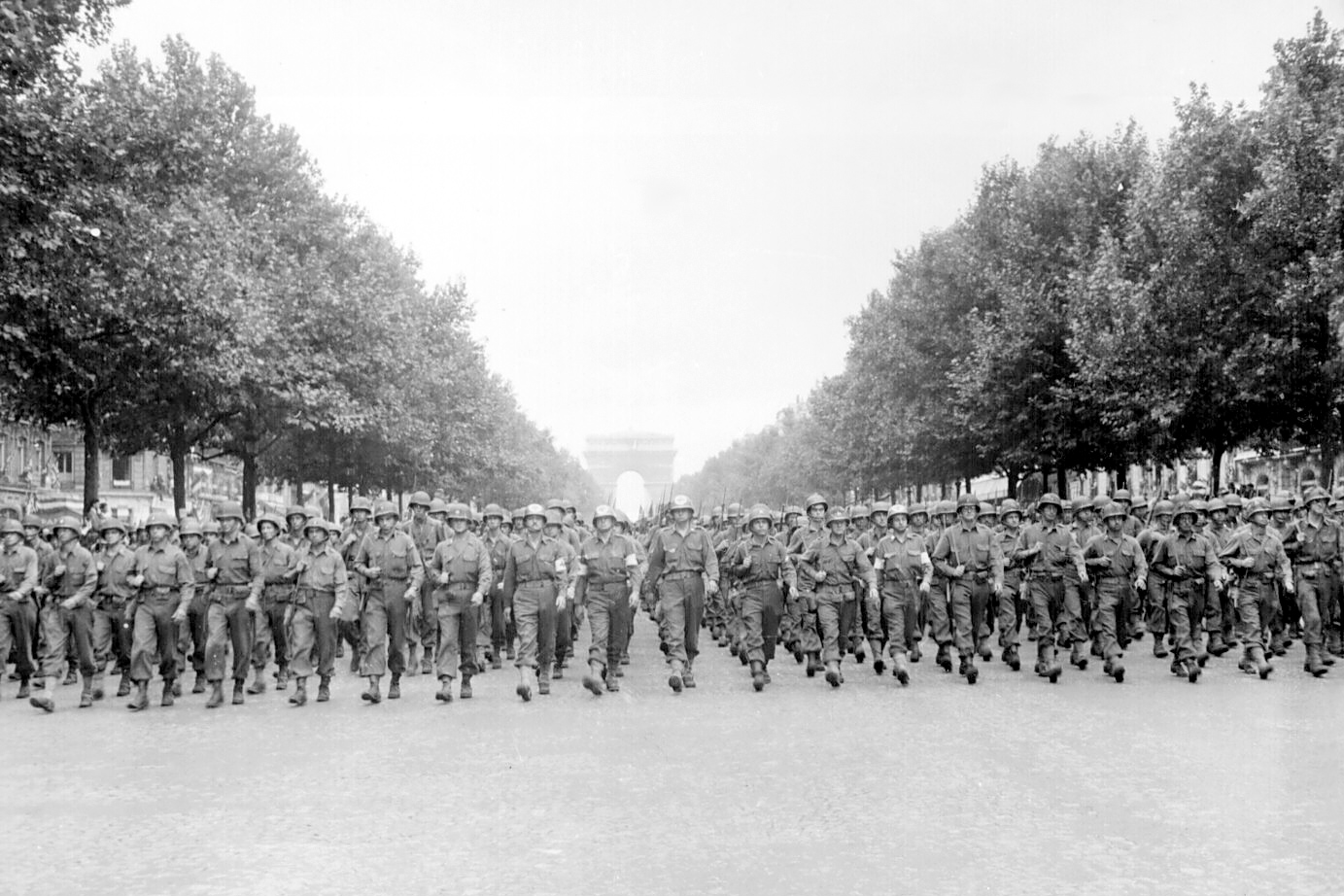
Troops from Pennsylvania's 28th Infantry Division march down the Avenue des Champs-Élysées in Paris on Aug. 29, 1944

In 1916, mobilization of the Commonwealth citizens occurred at Mt. Gretna for service on the Mexican Border. As troops began to come home, their mobilizations continued into World War I. The Pennsylvania division, now known as the 28th Division, was called up in the wake of U.S. entry into the war. The division took part in six major campaigns in France and Belgium resulting in more than 14,000 battle casualties. With its entry into the war, the American forces helped turn the tide to the Allied victory. The 28th Division's ferocity in combat earned it the title "Iron Division" from General John “Black Jack” Pershing, commander of the American Expeditionary Force.

In 1924, the 103rd Observation Squadron was organized at the Philadelphia Airport under the 28th Division. After World War II, the unit became the forerunner of today's Pennsylvania Air National Guard.

Between the wars, the 52nd Cavalry Brigade, raised in Pennsylvania, formed part of the 22nd Cavalry Division.

==== World War II ====
By 1939, the world was once again at war. Ten months before the Attack on Pearl Harbor, the 28th Division was ordered into federal service. After America entered World War II, the division trained extensively, both in the homeland and abroad in England and Wales. Landing in France after D-Day, the division fought through Normandy, helped liberate Paris, and ended up bitterly engaged in the Siegfried Line campaign in Western Germany in November 1944. One month later, during the Battle of the Bulge, the division proved instrumental in stalling the last German offensive of the war. The German High Command nicknamed the division "Bloody Bucket" following the fierce battles of the Hurtgen Forest and the Bulge. The unit suffered more than 25,000 casualties of which 2,000 were killed in action.

Elsewhere in the war, the division's 111th Regiment was detached to serve in the Pacific; Pennsylvania's 213th Regiment saw action in North Africa and Italy, while other units served across the globe.

In 1947, The Pennsylvania Air National Guard was formally established.

==== Korean War ====
For its efforts during the Korean War, the 28th Infantry Division was mobilized to reinforce NATO forces and was sent to Germany. Several other Pennsylvania National Guard units saw active service in Korea.

On September 11, 1950, in route to Camp Atterbury, Indiana, the 109th Field Artillery was involved in a train wreck in which another train on the same track ran into the rear of the troop train, killing 33 service members from two different batteries. More than 1,000 National Guardsmen from various sections of the state, who had not been summoned for federal service, acted as a guard of honor for the bodies.

==== Vietnam War ====
Pennsylvania Air National Guard airlift units flew 134 supply missions to Vietnam during 1966–1967, becoming the first reserve air force to ever enter a combat zone without being mobilized in the Vietnam War.

==== Hurricane Agnes ====
In 1972, the worst natural disaster to-date struck the Commonwealth occurred, Tropical Storm Agnes. As a result of the extensive damage caused by storms and flooding, the Pennsylvania National Guard was engaged in relief operations. The storm hit June 21, 1972. Guard units began relief operations from June 22 through August 6, 1972. It affected 122 communities in 35 out of the 67 Pennsylvania counties, with the hardest hit area being the Wyoming Valley region (Wilkes-Barre in Luzerne County). More than 55,000 homes were completely destroyed, thousands of additional homes damaged, and 126 bridges destroyed. There were more than $35 million in crop damages, more than 200,000 telephones out of service, 49 deaths, and property damages well over $3 billion. For the National Guard, a major call up was ordered. There were 12,036 Army National Guard and 644 Air National Guard members, for a total of 12,680 Pennsylvania National Guard personnel on duty during the flood.

==== Invasion of Grenada ====
During the invasion of Grenada the Pennsylvania Air Guard's 193rd Special Operations Group (today's 193rd Special Operations Wing) provided airborne broadcasting and surveillance during the U.S. invasion. Later missions in Panama, Haiti and elsewhere earned the 193rd the distinction of being the most-deployed unit in the entire Air Force.

==== Gulf War ====
After the Iraqi invasion of Kuwait in August 1990, eight Army and Air Guard units from Pennsylvania were mobilized for duty during Operations Desert Shield and Desert Storm. Among ANG units involved were the 193rd Special Operations Wing, flying C-130s modified to transmit radio and television signals, and the 171st Air Refueling Wing. Seemingly the four Army units were scheduled to all return home by May 1991. Every member returned home safely.

Following the end of the Cold War, National Guard State Partnership Programs were established across Europe. The Pennsylvania–Lithuania National Guard Partnership was initiated in 1993 as part of a U.S. initiative to promote the growth of democratic institutions among the newly independent states of the former Soviet Union.

=== 21st century ===
==== NATO intervention in Bosnia and Herzegovina ====
Approximately 1,100 28th Infantry Division Soldiers became the command element of NATO peacekeeping operations in Bosnia, from 2002 to 2003.

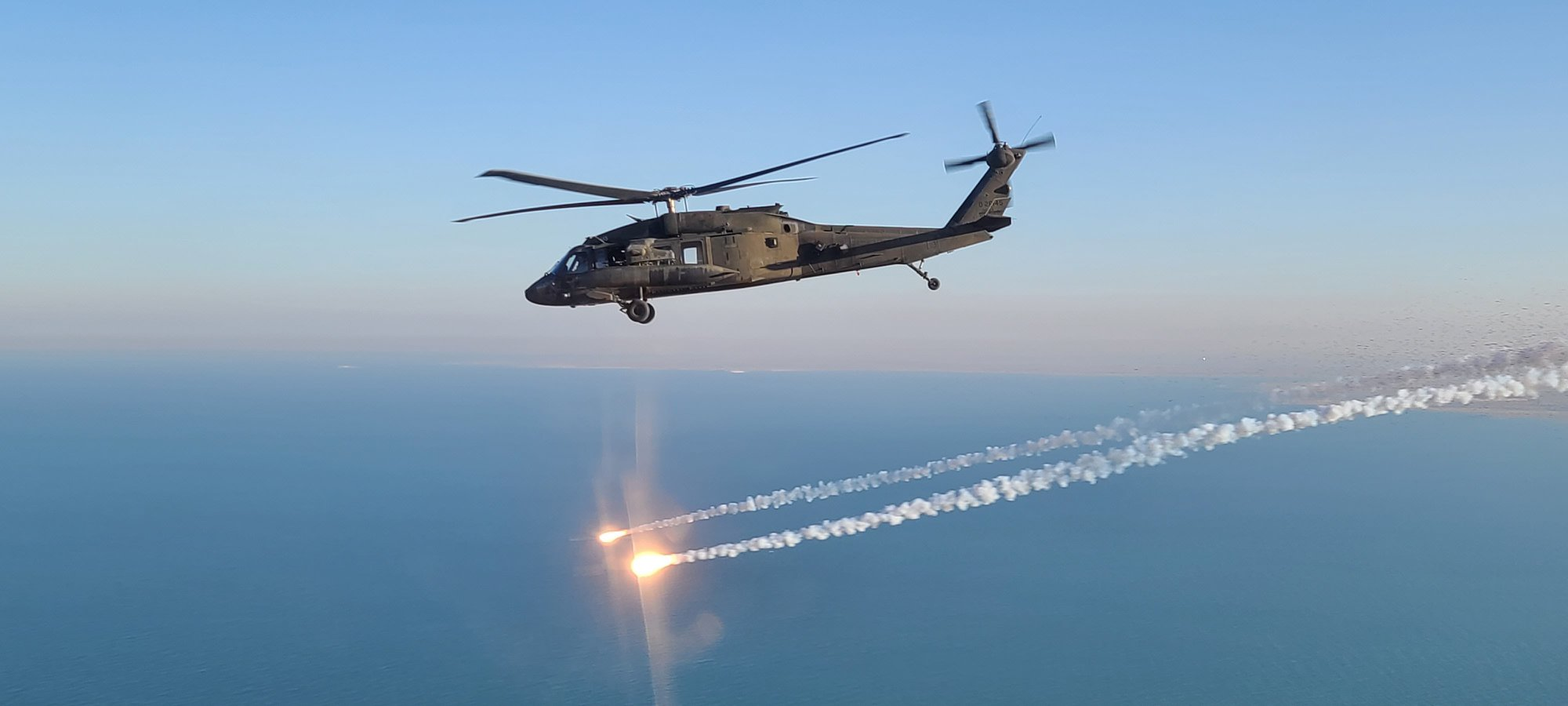
A UH-60 Black Hawk helicopter, operated by Soldiers with A Company, 2-104th General Support Aviation Battalion, 28th Expeditionary Combat Aviation Brigade, flies over Iraq on Jan. 1, 2021. (U.S. Army photo by Sgt. Andrew Johnson)

==== Kosovo Force ====
28th Infantry Division units become the first Guard command element for peacekeeping operations in eastern Kosovo from 2003 to 2004.

==== Iraq and Afghanistan Wars ====
The 213th Area Support Group, Co. G, 104th Aviation and several smaller support units deployed in support of Operations Enduring Freedom and Iraqi Freedom.

Approximately 2,000 Pennsylvania Soldiers and Airmen were deployed in 2004 in support of Operation Iraqi Freedom to search for weapons of mass destruction, provide convoy security, rebuild infrastructure, and protect senior officials.

Approximately 750 Soldiers assigned to Task Force Dragoon helped to protect 29 polling locations during Iraq's first free election in 2005. Task Force Dragoon units returned home in November. An additional 2,100 Soldiers from the 28th Infantry Division's 2d Brigade Combat Team, augmented by 2,000 Soldiers from 30 other states, touched down in Iraq in June. Known as the "Iron Brigade," Soldiers conducted convoy escorts and patrols, and provided training for Iraqi civil defense forces.

In 2007, about 380 Soldiers from 3rd Battalion, 103rd Armored Regiment deployed to Afghanistan. Units from the 213th Air Defense Artillery Battalion, 131st Transportation Company, 104th Aviation, 228th Brigade Support Battalion, 107th Field Artillery, and 28th Division Support Command returned from their overseas deployments.

==== Hurricane Katrina ====
On September 1, 2005, Governor Edward G. Rendell mobilized 2,500 Pennsylvania Army and Air National Guard members to support Hurricane Katrina disaster relief efforts along the Gulf Coast. Pennsylvania National Guard personnel arrived over the weekend of September 3–5. The relief mission lasted approximately 30 days.

==== Multinational Force and Observers ====
In 2007, approximately 400 Soldiers of the 104th Cavalry departed for a deployment to the Sinai Peninsula as part of the Multinational Force and Observers. Members of these troops stood watch along the border between Egypt and Israel to ensure that the 1978 Camp David Accords peace agreement was upheld.

==== U.S-Mexican Border ====
In 2008, both Army and Air National Guard members deployed to the Mexican Border. Members of the 201st Red Horse Squadron helped construct new roads and border fencing sections.

==== Operation Unified Response ====
In 2010, the governor Ed Rendell mobilized members of the 193rd Special Operations Wing to take part in Operation Unified Response, a humanitarian assistance mission in Haiti, which was impacted by a major earthquake.

==== NATO Enhanced Forward Presence ====
Several hundred Soldiers from the 55th Maneuver Enhancement Brigade deployed to Poland in 2019 for the NATO Enhanced Forward Presence mission.

==== Operation Inherent Resolve ====
In September 2020, about 1,000 Soldiers from the 28th Expeditionary Combat Aviation Brigade deployed to the Middle East, where they provided aviation assets at several locations for United States Central Command as part of Operation Inherent Resolve. Prior to deploying, the brigade completed pre-deployment training at Fort Hood in Texas.

==== 2021 Presidential Inauguration ====
In January 2021, following the 2021 storming of the United States Capitol, over 2,000 Pennsylvania National Guard members were activated and deployed to Washington, D.C., to provide support to the District of Columbia National Guard and federal law-enforcement agencies. About 450 additional Pa. Guard members were activated to help provide security at the Pennsylvania capital in Harrisburg and other locations in the state. After those missions concluded, about 450 other Pa. Guard members were activated and deployed to Washington, D.C., in February 2021 to support federal law-enforcement agencies for several weeks.

== Major Units ==
=== Army ===
- 28th Infantry Division (Harrisburg)
  - 2nd Infantry Brigade Combat Team (Washington, Pa.)
  - 28th Expeditionary Combat Aviation Brigade (Fort Indiantown Gap)
  - 55th Maneuver Enhancement Brigade (Scranton)
  - 56th Stryker Brigade Combat Team (Willow Grove)
- 213th Regional Support Group (Allentown)
- Fort Indiantown Gap Training Center
- Eastern Army National Guard Aviation Training Site (Fort Indiantown Gap)
- 166th Regiment Regional Training Institute (Fort Indiantown Gap)
- Pennsylvania Army National Guard Recruiting and Retention Battalion (Fort Indiantown Gap)

=== Air ===
- 111th Attack Wing (Willow Grove)
- 171st Air Refueling Wing (Pittsburgh)
- 193rd Special Operations Wing (Middletown)

== Leadership ==
Commander-in-Chief: Governor Josh Shapiro

Adjutant General: Army Major General John R. Pippy

Deputy Adjutant General - Army: Army Major General Michael E. Wegscheider

Deputy Adjutant General - Air: Air Force Major General Terrence L. Koudelka Jr.

Director of the Joint Staff: Vacant

Senior Enlisted Leader: Army Command Sergeant Major Shawn Phillips

== Adjutants General of Pennsylvania ==
Individuals who have served as Pennsylvania's adjutant general include:

- Brigadier General Josiah Harmar - 1793 to February 27, 1799
- Brigadier General Peter Baynton - February 27, 1799 to 1802
- Brigadier General Richard Humpton - 1802 to January 1, 1805
- Brigadier General Mahlon Dickerson - January 1, 1805 to July 22, 1808
- Brigadier General Thomas McKean Jr. - July 22, 1808 to August 3, 1811
- Brigadier General William Reed - August 3, 1811 to June 15, 1813 (died in office)
- Brigadier General William N. Irvine - July 6, 1813 to September 20, 1813
- Brigadier General William Duncan - September 20, 1813 to August 1, 1814
- Brigadier General John N. Hyneman - August 1, 1814 to March 21, 1816
- Brigadier General Nathaniel B. Boileau - March 21, 1816 to October 1, 1816
- Brigadier General William N. Irvine - October 1, 1816 to August 23, 1821
- Brigadier General Robert Carr - August 23, 1821 to August 4, 1824
- Brigadier General George B. Porter - August 4, 1824 to August 19, 1829
- Brigadier General Simon Cameron - August 19, 1829 to May 3, 1830
- Brigadier General Samuel Power - May 3, 1830 to August 3, 1836
- Brigadier General William Piper - August 3, 1836 to August 3, 1839
- Brigadier General James K. Moorehead - August 3, 1839 to August 12, 1839 (declined after appointed)
- Brigadier General Adam Diller - August 12, 1839 to July 15, 1845
- Brigadier General George W. Bowman - July 15, 1845 to November 21, 1848
- Brigadier General William H. Irwin - November 21, 1848 to February 2, 1852
- Brigadier General James Keenan - February 2, 1852 to October 18, 1852
- Brigadier General George W. Bowman - October 18, 1852 to October 25, 1856
- Brigadier General Thomas J. Power - October 25, 1856 to February 5, 1858
- Brigadier General Edwin C. Wilson - February 5, 1858 to April 17, 1861
- Brigadier General Edward M. Biddle - April 17, 1861 to January 9, 1862
- Brigadier General Alexander L. Russell - January 9, 1862 to October 11, 1867
- Brigadier General David B. McCreary - October 11, 1867 to January 4, 1870
- Brigadier General Alexander L. Russell - January 4, 1870 to June 1, 1873
- Brigadier General James W. Latta - June 1, 1873 to January 16, 1883
- Brigadier General Presley N. Guthrie - January 16, 1883 to January 18, 1887
- Brigadier General Daniel H. Hastings - January 18, 1887 to January 20, 1891
- Brigadier General William McClelland - January 20, 1891 to February 7, 1892 (died in office)
- Lieutenant Colonel Alexander Krumbhaar - February 7, 1892 to March 8, 1892
- Brigadier General Walter W. Greenland - March 8, 1892 to January 15, 1895
- Brigadier General Thomas J. Stewart - January 15, 1895 to September 11, 1917 (died in office)
- Colonel Frank D. Beary September 11, 1917 to October 4, 1917
- Brigadier General Frank D. Beary October 4, 1917 to January 20, 1931
- Brigadier General David J. Davis - January 20, 1931 to January 15, 1935
- Brigadier General Frederick B. Kerr - January 15, 1935 to January 17, 1939
- Major General Edward Martin - January 17, 1939 to January 20, 1943
- Brigadier General Robert M. Vail - January 20, 1943 to April 19, 1955
- Major General Anthony Joseph Drexel Biddle Jr. - April 19, 1955 to April 4, 1961
- Major General Malcolm Hay - April 11, 1961 to January 15, 1963
- Major General Thomas R. White Jr. - January 15, 1963 to February 20, 1968 (died in office)
- Major General Richard Snyder - May 6, 1968 to April 19, 1972
- Major General Harry J. Mier Jr. - April 19, 1972 to April 28, 1977
- Major General Nicholas P. Kafkalas - April 28, 1977 to February 16, 1979
- Major General Richard M. Scott - February 16, 1979 to January 20, 1987
- Major General Gerald T. Sajer - January 20, 1987 to April 15, 1995
- Major General James W. Mac Vay - April 15, 1995 to March 23, 1999
- Major General William B. Lynch - March 23, 1999 to February 4, 2004
- Major General Jessica L. Wright - February 5, 2004 to November 7, 2010
- Major General Stephen M. Sischo - November 7, 2010 to February 3, 2011
- Major General Wesley E. Craig - February 3, 2011 to January 20, 2015
- Major General James R. Joseph - January 20, 2015 to March 11, 2016
- Major General Anthony J. Carrelli - March 11, 2016 to December 5, 2020
- Major General Mark J. Schindler - December 5, 2020 to September 30, 2024
- Major General John R. Pippy - October 1, 2024 to present

== State Partnership Program ==
As part of the National Guard's State Partnership Program, the Pennsylvania National Guard has had a partnership with Lithuania since 1993. Since the beginning of the partnership the two sides have had over 700 total engagements, including military exercises, senior leader exchanges, strategic planning, professional development and defense support to civil authorities training.

== Gallery ==
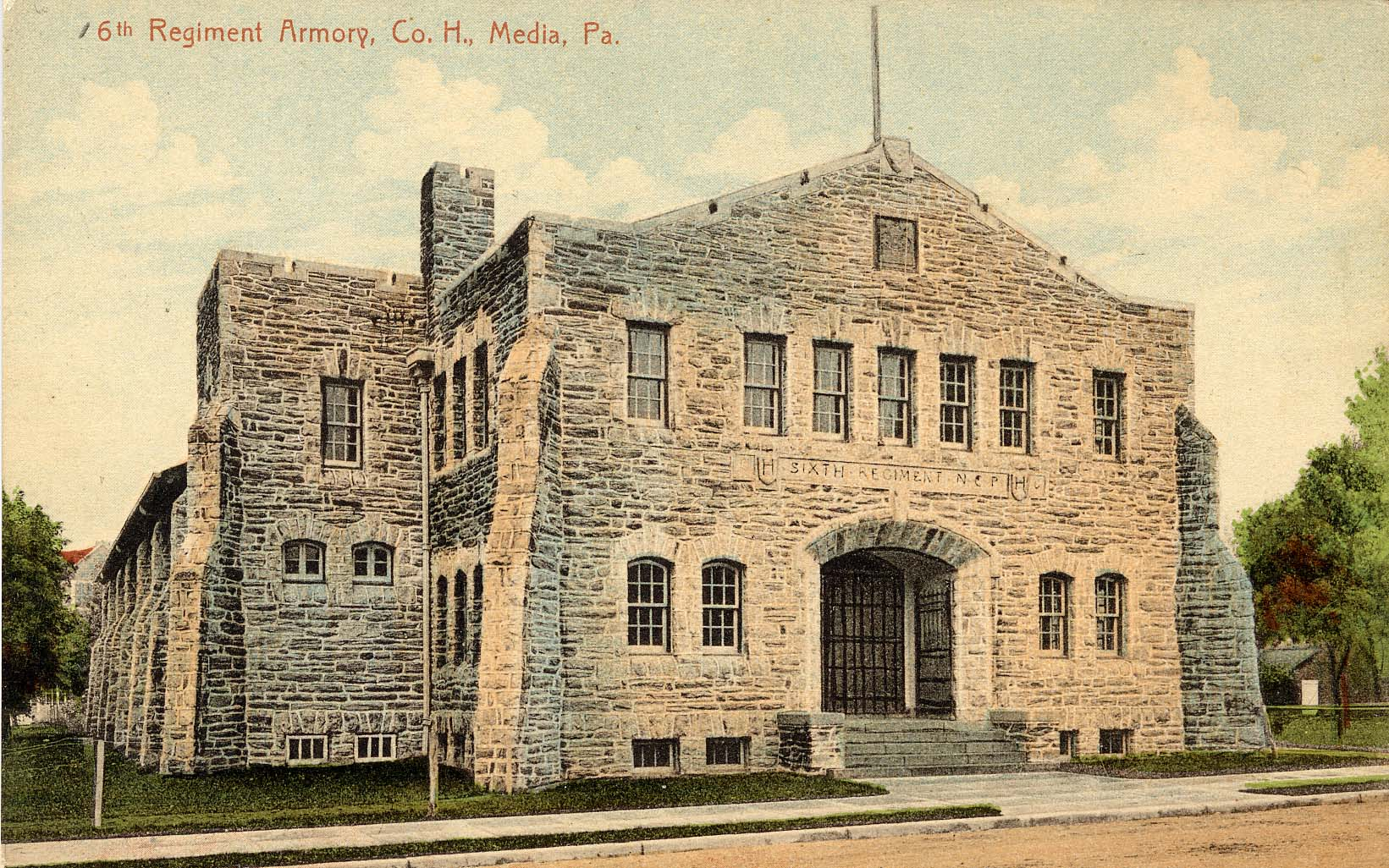
Media Armory

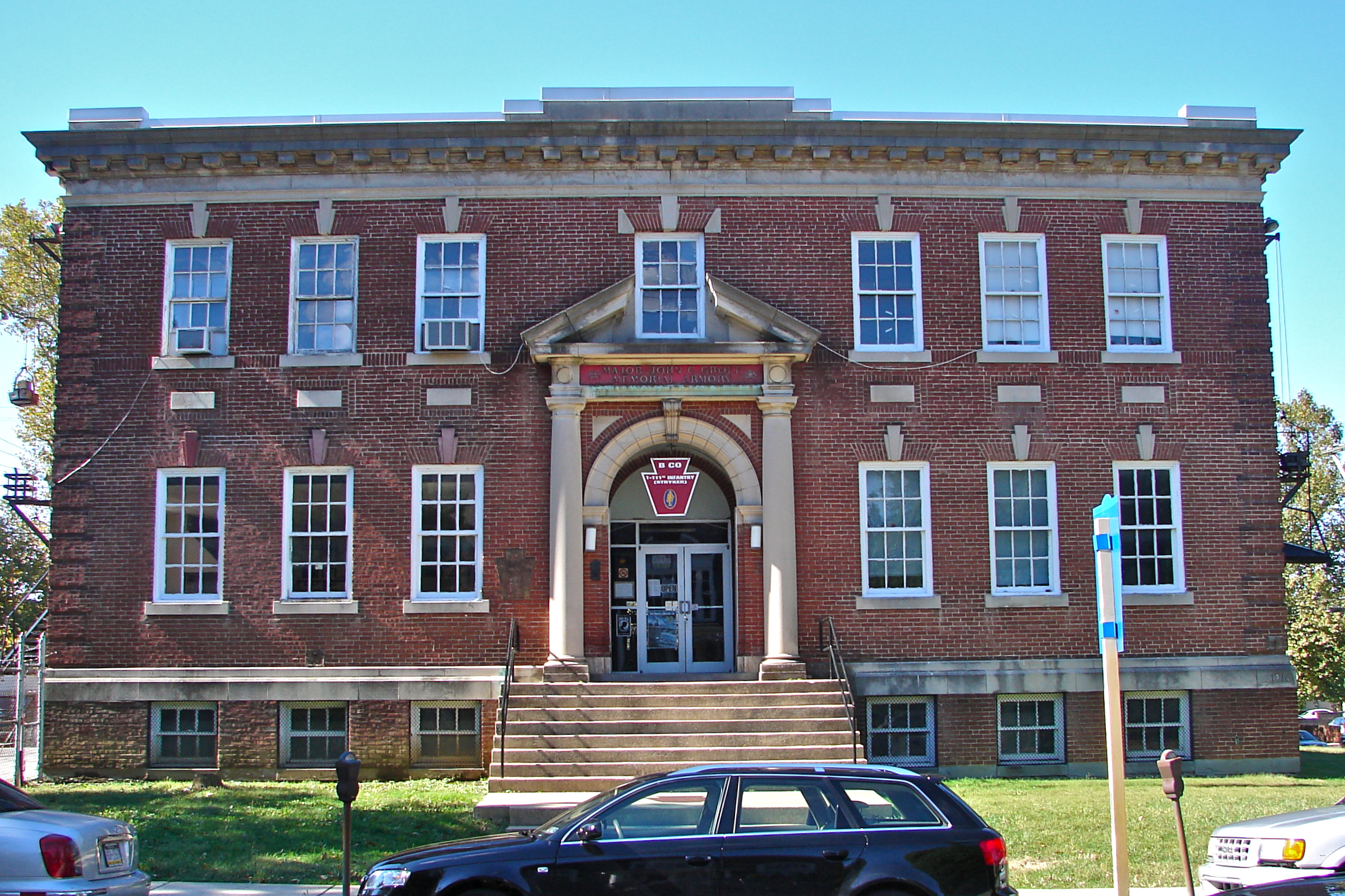
Groff Armory in West Chester

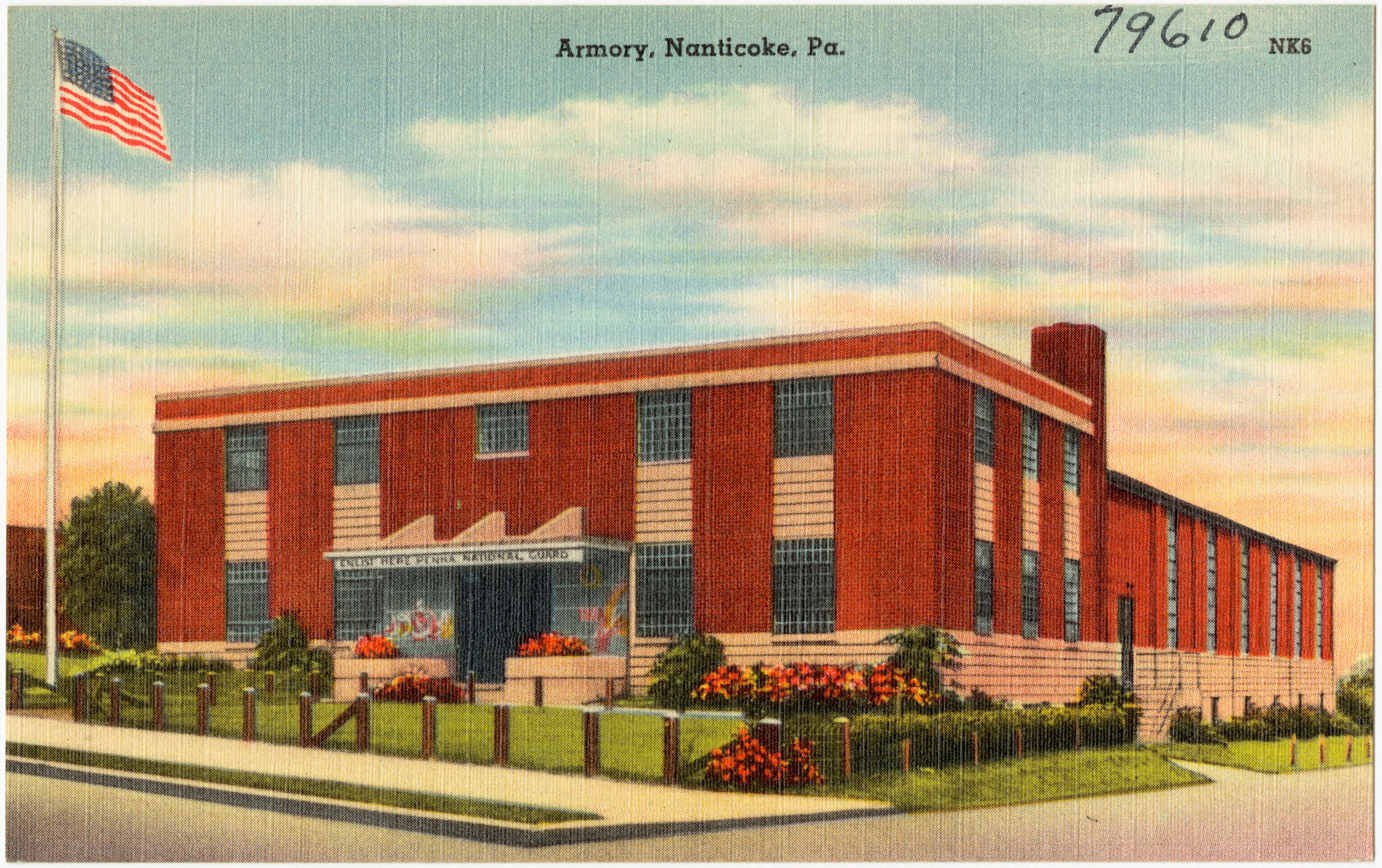
Armory in Nanticoke

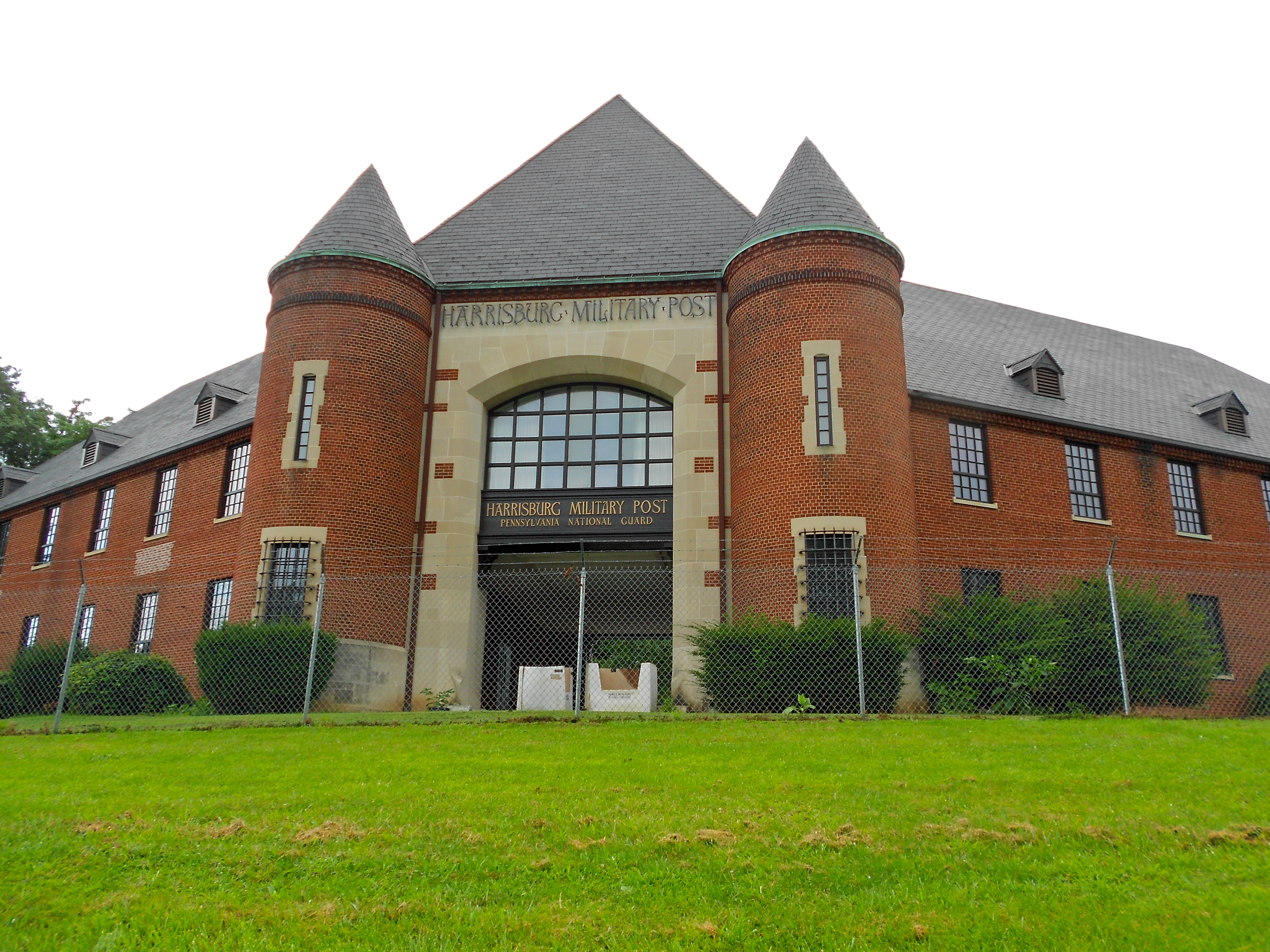
Harrisburg Military Post

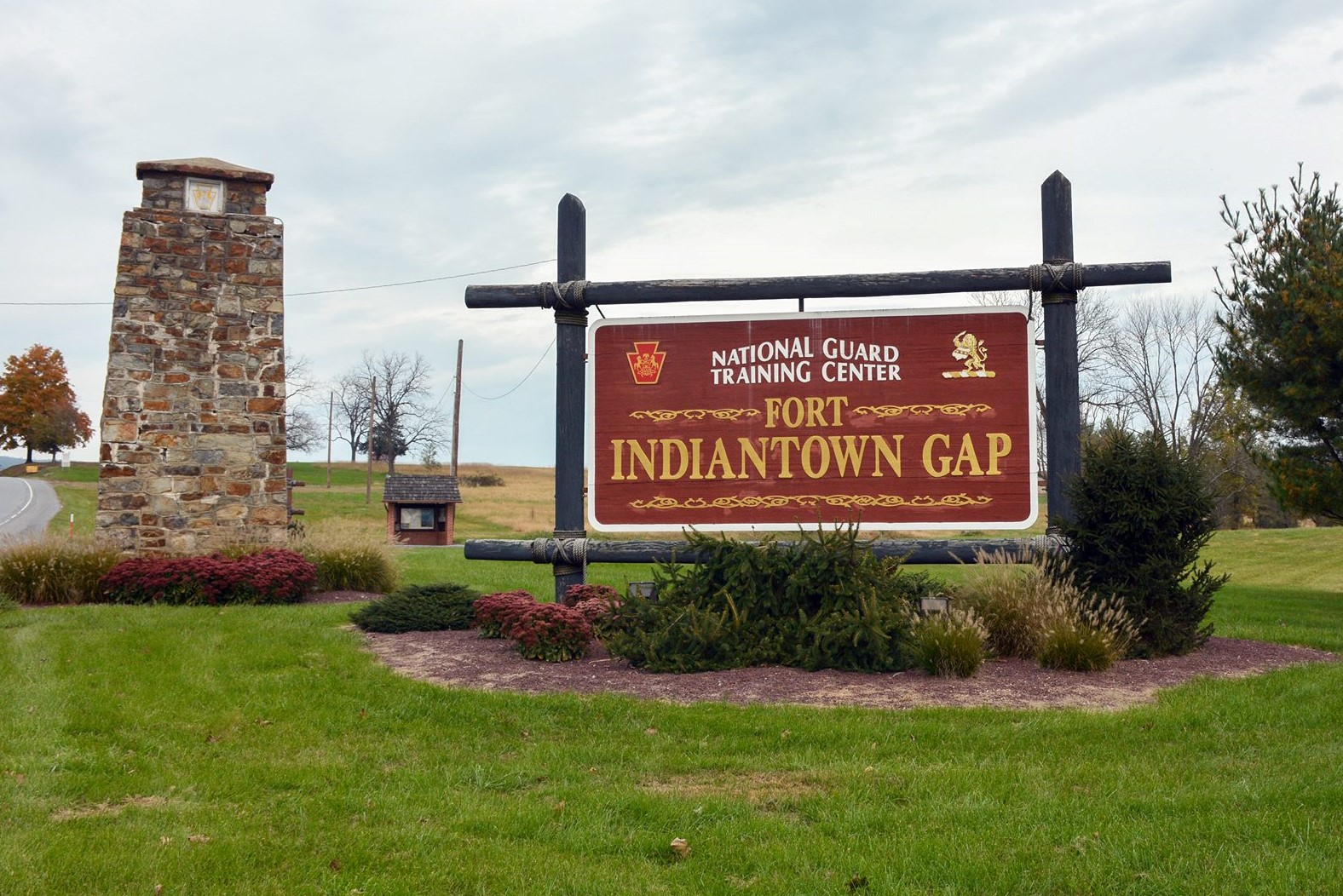
Fort Indiantown Gap

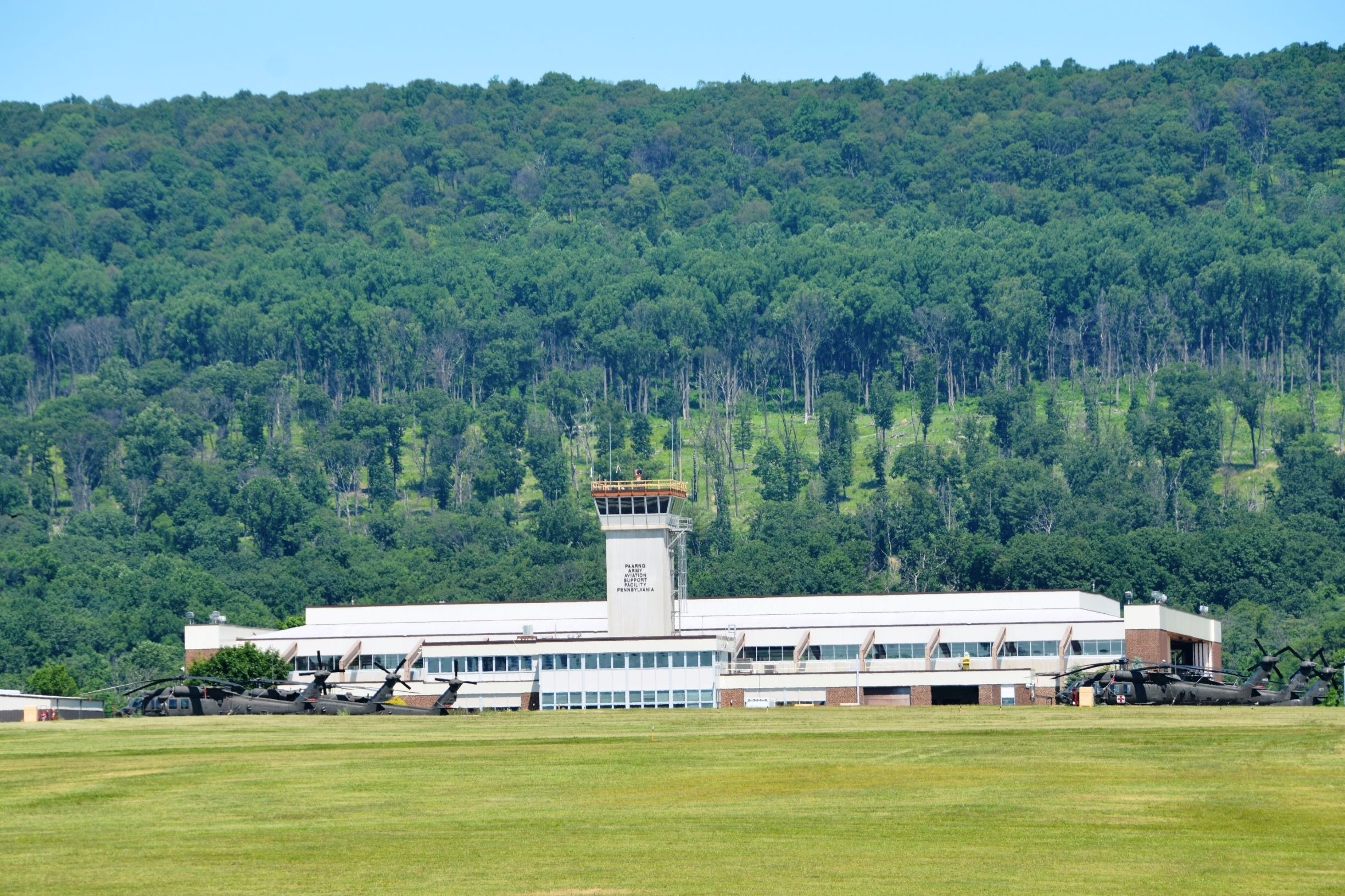
Muir Army Airfield

== See also ==
- Associators
- Pennsylvania National Guard awards and decorations
- List of Pennsylvania state agencies
- Media Armory
- Pennsylvania State Guard
