= William McCandless =

American politician

William "Buck" McCandless
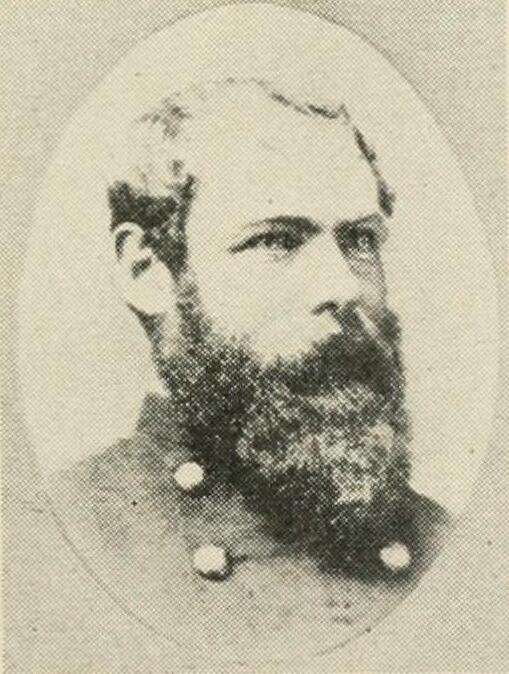
- Portrait of McCandless
- Born: September 29, 1834; Ireland
- Died: June 17, 1884 (aged 49); Philadelphia, Pennsylvania, U.S.
- Burial place: Mount Moriah Cemetery, Philadelphia, Pennsylvania, U.S.
- Military career
- Allegiance: United States; Union
- Branch: United States Army; Union Army
- Rank: Colonel
- Nickname: Buck
- Units: 2nd Pennsylvania Reserve Regiment; Pennsylvania Reserve Division
- Conflicts: American Civil War; Seven Days Battle; Second Battle of Bull Run; Battle of Fredericksburg; Battle of Gettysburg; Bristoe Campaign; Battle of Mine Run; Battle of the Wilderness; Battle of Spotsylvania
- Other work: State Senator

William "Buck" McCandless (September 29, 1834 – June 17, 1884) was an American military officer and politician from Pennsylvania. He served in the Union Army during the American Civil War and commanded a regiment and then a brigade in the Pennsylvania Reserve Division. He served as a Democratic member of the Pennsylvania State Senate for the 1st district from 1867 to 1868 and as the first Secretary of Internal Affairs of Pennsylvania from 1875 to 1879.

== Early life ==
McCandless was born in Ireland on September 29, 1834. He was raised by his Uncle after his parents death when he was a young child. The family emigrated to Philadelphia, Pennsylvania, when McCandless was six years old. He attended public schools and apprenticed as a machinist at Norris Locomotive Works. He studied law and entered the bar in 1858.

== Military career ==
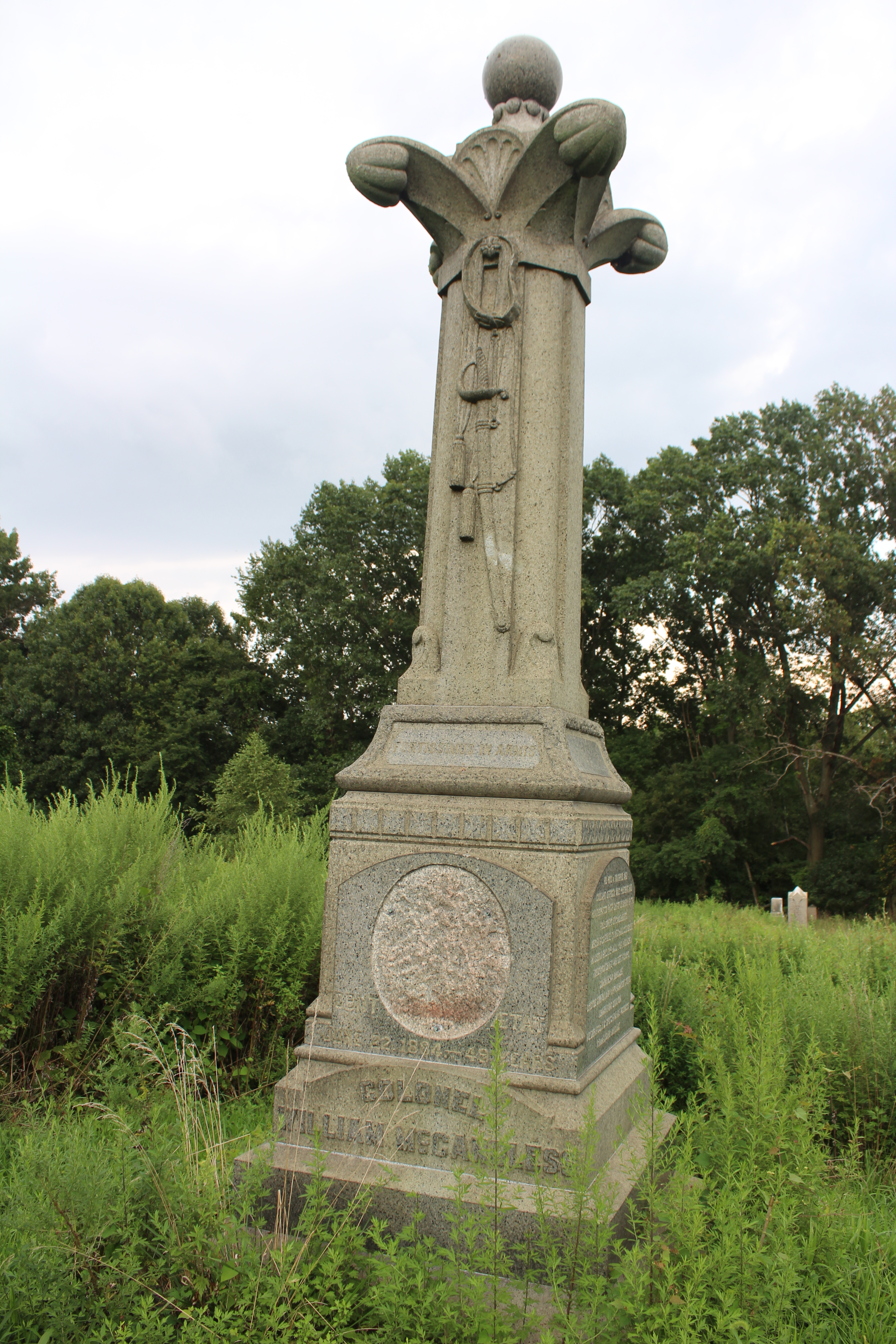
William McCandless Memorial in Mount Moriah Cemetery

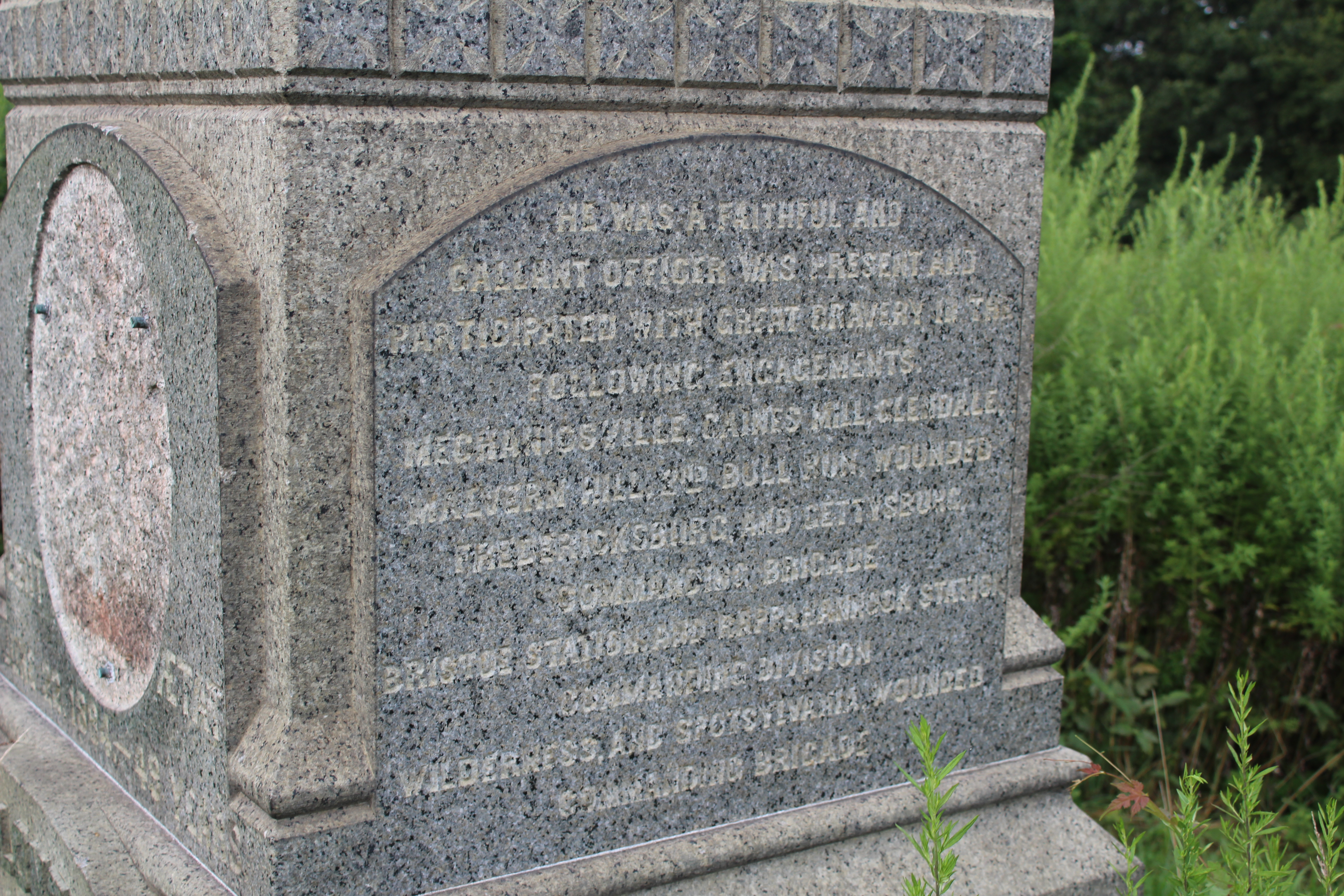
Right Side of William McCandless Memorial

McCandless enlisted in the 2nd Pennsylvania Reserve Regiment, as a private; but he was promoted to the rank of major in June 1861. He became the regiment's colonel in August 1862. The 2nd Reserves served in the Seven Days Battles in the Army of the Potomac and later at the Second Battle of Bull Run and the Battle of Antietam. McCandless was wounded at Second Bull Run and missed Antietam. (Captain James N. Byrnes commanded in his absence.)

When William Sinclair was wounded in the Battle of Fredericksburg, McCandless succeeded him in command of the 1st Brigade of the Reserves under George Gordon Meade. The division was, at that time, 3rd Division, I Corps. It had penetrated the Confederate right flank along the line of A. P. Hill’s Light Division. After Fredericksburg, the division was transferred to the defenses of Washington, D.C., to recuperate from its losses on active duty.

In May 1863, the Reserves, then commanded by Samuel W. Crawford, returned to the Army of the Potomac and became the 3rd Division of the V Corps. McCandless retained command of the 1st Brigade, and was active in the Battle of Gettysburg. On the second day of the battle, McCandless moved to the army’s left and deployed his men in two lines, together with the 93rd Pennsylvania Infantry of Frank Wheaton’s brigade, at the foot of Little Round Top. McCandless’ brigade, under immediate supervision by Crawford, launched a counterattack against the Confederates, mostly from William T. Wofford’s command, across Plum Run Valley and up slope to the edge of the Wheatfield on July 2, 1863. (Wofford had been ordered to withdraw and did not resist as fiercely as he desired.) McCandless's brigade held its position to the end of the battle. Then it advanced late on July 3, gathering up stragglers from the Confederate withdrawal.

McCandless commanded the division in the Bristoe Campaign in the fall of 1863. He reverted to brigade command and served under Crawford in the Mine Run Campaign. McCandless retained his brigade in the Overland Campaign of Ulysses S. Grant. He was wounded in the Battle of Spotsylvania. Grant and Meade offered him promotion to the rank of brigadier general, but he declined. Colonel McCandless was mustered out of the volunteer service with his regiment on June 6, 1864.

== Political career ==
He was a member of the Pennsylvania State Senate for the 1st district from 1867 to 1869.

McCandless returned to Philadelphia and resumed his civilian career. He was elected as the first Secretary of Internal Affairs of Pennsylvania in 1874 and served from 1875 until 1879.

He died on June 17, 1884, and was interred at the Mount Moriah Cemetery in Philadelphia, Pennsylvania.

== Sources ==
- Jorgensen, Jay, Gettysburg’s Bloody Wheatfield, Shippensburg, PA: White Mane Books, 2002.
- Pfanz, Harry W., Gettysburg: the Second Day, Chapel Hill: University of North Carolina Press, 1987.
- Rable, George C., Fredericksburg! Fredericksburg!, Chapel Hill: University of North Carolina Press, 2002.
- Sypher, J. R., History of the Pennsylvania Reserve Corps, Lancaster, PA: Elias Barr & Co., 1865.

Pennsylvania State Senate
Preceded by Stephen Fowler Wilson	Member of the Pennsylvania Senate, 1st district 1867–1868	Succeeded by William W. Watt
