= 2017 Philadelphia municipal election =

2017 Pennsylvania local election

2017 Philadelphia elections
- November 7, 2017

A general election was held in Philadelphia, Pennsylvania on November 7, 2017 to elect various county and city-level positions. The primary election was held on May 16, 2017.

== District Attorney ==
2017 Philadelphia district attorney election
- November 7, 2017
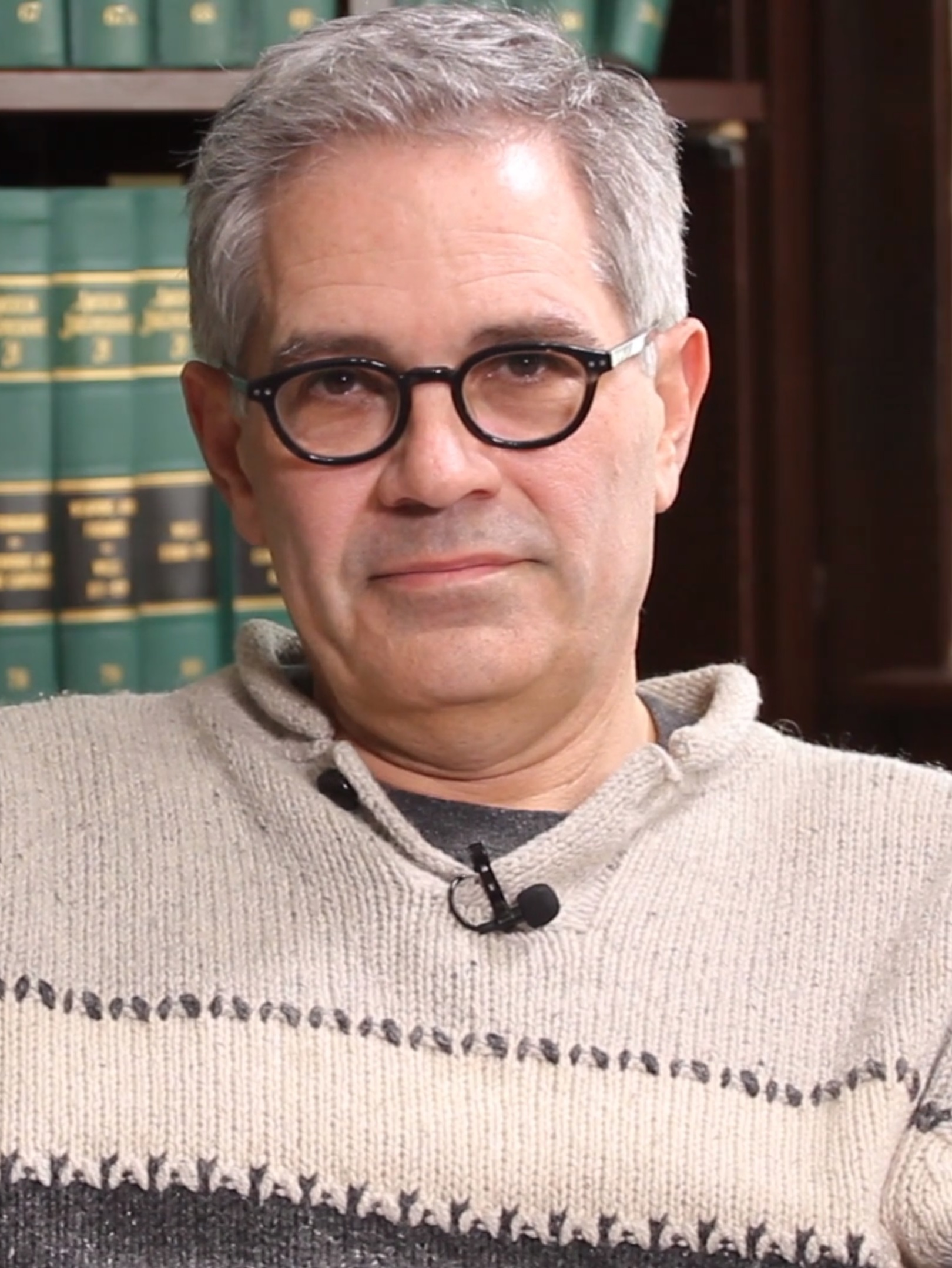

| Candidate | Larry Krasner | Beth Grossman |
| Party | Democratic | Republican |
| Popular vote | 150,330 | 50,858 |
| Percentage | 74.70% | 25.27% |
- Krasner: 50–60% 60–70% 70–80% 80–90% >90% Grossman: 50–60% 60–70% 70–80% 80–90% >90% Tie: 50%
District Attorney before election
Kelley B. Hodge
Democratic
Elected District Attorney
Larry Krasner
Democratic

Philadelphia district attorney Seth Williams resigned in June 2017, having plead guilty to charges of bribery, extortion, and fraud. Kelley B. Hodge served as interim.

Larry Krasner, a criminal defense lawyer widely considered as a progressive and "anti-establishment", won a crowded Democratic primary and the general election over Republican Beth Grossman.

=== Democratic primary ===
==== Nominee ====
- Larry Krasner, criminal defense lawyer

==== Eliminated in primary ====
- Teresa Carr Deni, Philadelphia Municipal Court judge (1995–2016)
- Tariq El-Shabazz, former deputy District Attorney
- Joe Khan, former District Attorney prosecutor and assistant U.S. Attorney
- Rich Negrin, former Philadelphia city managing director
- Jack O'Neill, former assistant District Attorney
- Michael Untermeyer, attorney and real estate investor and Republican nominee in 2009

==== Results ====
Primary results by ward Krasner: 20%–30%; 30%–40%; 40%–50%; 50%–60%; 60%–70%; Khan: 20%–30%; 30%–40%; Negrin: 20%–30%; 40%–50%; 50%–60%; El-Shabazz: 30%–40%; Untermeyer: 20%–30%; O'Neill: 20%–30%

Democratic primary results
| Party | Candidate | Votes | % |
|---|---|---|---|
| Democratic | Larry Krasner | 59,368 | 38.24 |
| Democratic | Joe Khan | 31,480 | 20.28 |
| Democratic | Rich Negrin | 22,048 | 14.20 |
| Democratic | Tariq El-Shabazz | 18,040 | 11.62 |
| Democratic | Michael Untermeyer | 12,709 | 8.19 |
| Democratic | John O'Neill | 9,246 | 5.96 |
| Democratic | Teresa Carr Deni | 2,335 | 1.50 |
| Write-in | | 20 | 0.01 |
| Total votes | | 155,246 | 100.00 |

=== Republican primary ===
==== Nominee ====
- Beth Grossman, former assistant District Attorney

==== Results ====
Republican primary results
| Party | Candidate | Votes | % |
|---|---|---|---|
| Republican | Beth Grossman | 9,434 | 99.44 |
| Write-in | | 53 | 0.56 |
| Total votes | | 9,487 | 100.00 |

=== General election ===
==== Results ====
2017 Philadelphia District Attorney election
| Party | Candidate | Votes | % |
|---|---|---|---|
| Democratic | Larry Krasner | 150,330 | 74.70 |
| Republican | Beth Grossman | 50,858 | 25.27 |
| Write-in | | 58 | 0.03 |
| Total votes | | 201,246 | 100.00 |
| Democratic hold | | | |

== City Controller ==
2017 Philadelphia city controller election
- November 7, 2017
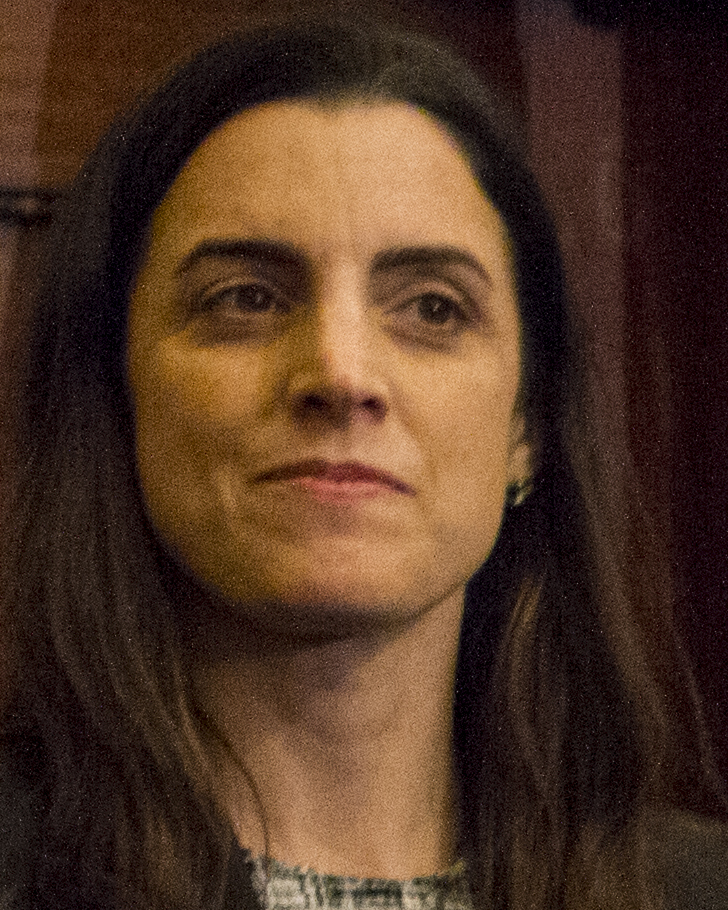

| Candidate | Rebecca Rhynhart | Michael Tomlinson |
| Party | Democratic | Republican |
| Popular vote | 161,273 | 33,512 |
| Percentage | 82.78% | 17.20% |
- Rhynhart: 50–60% 60–70% 70–80% 80–90% >90% Tomlinson: 50–60% 60–70% 70–80% Tie: 50%
City Controller before election
Alan Butkovitz
Democratic
Elected City Controller
Rebecca Rhynhart
Democratic

Incumbent City Controller Alan Butkovitz was defeated in the Democratic primary by Rebecca Rhynhart, who subsequently won the general election in a landslide. Rhynhart became the first woman elected to this office.

=== Democratic primary ===
==== Nominee ====
- Rebecca Rhynhart, Chief Administrative Officer and former city Budget Director

==== Defeated in primary ====
- Alan Butkovitz, incumbent city controller (2006–present)

==== Results ====
Primary results by ward Rhynhart: 50%–60%; 60%–70%; 70%–80%; Butkovitz: 50%–60%; 60%–70%

Democratic primary results
| Party | Candidate | Votes | % |
|---|---|---|---|
| Democratic | Rebecca Rhynhart | 79,133 | 58.70 |
| Democratic | Alan Butkovitz (incumbent) | 55,593 | 41.24 |
| Write-in | | 81 | 0.06 |
| Total votes | | 134,807 | 100.00 |

=== Republican primary ===
==== Nominee ====
- Michael Tomlinson

==== Results ====
Republican primary results
| Party | Candidate | Votes | % |
|---|---|---|---|
| Republican | Michael Tomlinson | 9,339 | 99.71 |
| Write-in | | 27 | 0.29 |
| Total votes | | 9,366 | 100.00 |

=== General election ===
==== Results ====
2017 Philadelphia City Controller election
| Party | Candidate | Votes | % |
|---|---|---|---|
| Democratic | Rebecca Rhynhart | 161,273 | 82.78 |
| Republican | Michael Tomlinson | 33,512 | 17.20 |
| Write-in | | 47 | 0.02 |
| Total votes | | 194,832 | 100.00 |
| Democratic hold | | | |

== Court of Common Pleas partisan election ==
=== Democratic primary ===
==== Results ====
Democratic primary results (vote for up to 9)
| Party | Candidate | Votes | % |
|---|---|---|---|
| Democratic | Stella Tsai | 63,980 | 7.73 |
| Democratic | Vikki Kristiansson | 62,656 | 7.57 |
| Democratic | Lucretia C. Clemons | 47,015 | 5.68 |
| Democratic | Deborah Cianfrani | 43,838 | 5.30 |
| Democratic | Zac Shaffer | 39,633 | 4.79 |
| Democratic | Deborah Canty | 39,239 | 4.74 |
| Democratic | Shanese Johnson | 36,792 | 4.45 |
| Democratic | Mark B. Cohen | 36,461 | 4.41 |
| Democratic | Vincent Furlong (Note: Cross-filed for the Republican nomination.) | 35,904 | 4.34 |
| Democratic | Jennifer Schultz | 34,224 | 4.14 |
| Democratic | Daniel R. Sulman | 33,984 | 4.11 |
| Democratic | Leon Goodman | 33,338 | 4.03 |
| Democratic | Wendi Barish | 31,831 | 3.85 |
| Democratic | Henry McGregor Sias | 31,526 | 3.81 |
| Democratic | Rania Major | 30,393 | 3.67 |
| Democratic | John Macoretta | 29,829 | 3.60 |
| Democratic | David Conroy | 28,453 | 3.44 |
| Democratic | Brian McLaughlin | 26,214 | 3.17 |
| Democratic | Crystal B. Powell | 24,756 | 2.99 |
| Democratic | Vincent Melchiorre | 24,360 | 2.94 |
| Democratic | Lawrence J. Bozzelli | 23,862 | 2.88 |
| Democratic | Danyl S. Patterson | 16,582 | 2.00 |
| Democratic | Terri M. Booker | 14,176 | 1.71 |
| Democratic | Leonard Deutchman | 12,590 | 1.52 |
| Democratic | Mark J. Moore | 12,305 | 1.49 |
| Democratic | Jon Marshall | 7,584 | 0.92 |
| Democratic | Bill Rice | 5,985 | 0.72 |
| Write-in | | 60 | 0.01 |
| Total votes | | 827,570 | 100.00 |

=== Republican primary ===
==== Results ====
Republican primary results (vote for up to 9)
| Party | Candidate | Votes | % |
|---|---|---|---|
| Republican | Vincent Furlong (Note: Cross-filed for the Democratic nomination.) | 9,113 | 98.46 |
| Write-in | | 143 | 1.54 |
| Total votes | | 9,256 | 100.00 |

=== General election ===
==== Results ====
2017 Philadelphia Court of Common Pleas election (vote for up to 9)
| Party | Candidate | Votes | % |
|---|---|---|---|
| Democratic | Vincent Furlong | 158,194 | 12.28 |
| Democratic | Stella Tsai | 148,795 | 11.55 |
| Democratic | Lucretia C. Clemons | 146,413 | 11.36 |
| Democratic | Deborah Canty | 145,571 | 11.30 |
| Democratic | Vikki Kristiansson | 144,525 | 11.22 |
| Democratic | Zac Shaffer | 142,417 | 11.05 |
| Democratic | Deborah Cianfrani | 134,774 | 10.46 |
| Democratic | Shanese Johnson | 134,376 | 10.43 |
| Democratic | Mark B. Cohen | 133,374 | 10.35 |
| Write-in | | 226 | 0.02 |
| Total votes | | 1,288,665 | 100.00 |

== Court of Common Pleas retention elections ==
=== Results ===
Justice Linda A. Carpenter retention, 2017
| Choice | Votes | % |
|---|---|---|
| For | 86,786 | 81.09 |
| Against | 20,236 | 18.91 |
| Total | 107,022 | 100.00 |
Source: Philadelphia City Commissioners

Justice Ellen Ceisler retention, 2017
| Choice | Votes | % |
|---|---|---|
| For | 85,019 | 81.21 |
| Against | 19,669 | 18.79 |
| Total | 104,688 | 100.00 |
Source: Philadelphia City Commissioners

Justice Michael Erdos retention, 2017
| Choice | Votes | % |
|---|---|---|
| For | 74,771 | 74.90 |
| Against | 25,061 | 25.10 |
| Total | 99,832 | 100.00 |
Source: Philadelphia City Commissioners

Justice Shelley Robins New retention, 2017
| Choice | Votes | % |
|---|---|---|
| For | 78,081 | 80.14 |
| Against | 19,354 | 19.86 |
| Total | 97,435 | 100.00 |
Source: Philadelphia City Commissioners

Justice Rosalyn K. Robinson retention, 2017
| Choice | Votes | % |
|---|---|---|
| For | 80,435 | 79.31 |
| Against | 20,989 | 20.69 |
| Total | 101,424 | 100.00 |
Source: Philadelphia City Commissioners

Justice M. Teresa Sarmina retention, 2017
| Choice | Votes | % |
|---|---|---|
| For | 76,366 | 77.64 |
| Against | 21,994 | 22.36 |
| Total | 98,360 | 100.00 |
Source: Philadelphia City Commissioners

== Philadelphia Municipal Court partisan election ==
=== Democratic primary ===
==== Results ====
Democratic primary results (vote for up to 2)
| Party | Candidate | Votes | % |
|---|---|---|---|
| Democratic | Marissa Brumbach | 78,443 | 38.04 |
| Democratic | Matt Wolf | 52,424 | 25.42 |
| Democratic | George Twardy | 31,612 | 15.33 |
| Democratic | Sherman Toppin | 21,748 | 10.55 |
| Democratic | Jon Marshall | 15,355 | 7.45 |
| Democratic | Bill Rice | 6,584 | 3.19 |
| Write-in | | 33 | 0.02 |
| Total votes | | 206,199 | 100.00 |

=== Republican primary ===
==== Results ====
Republican primary results (vote for up to 2)
| Party | Candidate | Votes | % |
|---|---|---|---|
| | Write-in | 68 | 100.00 |
| Total votes | | 68 | 100.00 |

=== General election ===
==== Results ====
2017 Philadelphia Municipal Court election (vote for up to 2)
| Party | Candidate | Votes | % |
|---|---|---|---|
| Democratic | Marissa Brumbach | 155,477 | 51.49 |
| Democratic | Matt Wolf | 146,374 | 48.48 |
| Write-in | | 91 | 0.03 |
| Total votes | | 301,942 | 100.00 |

== Philadelphia Municipal Court retention elections ==
=== Results ===
Justice James Maurice Deleon III retention, 2017
| Choice | Votes | % |
|---|---|---|
| For | 70,567 | 68.90 |
| Against | 31,854 | 31.10 |
| Total | 102,421 | 100.00 |
Source: Philadelphia City Commissioners

Justice Joyce O. Eubanks retention, 2017
| Choice | Votes | % |
|---|---|---|
| For | 81,543 | 80.12 |
| Against | 20,232 | 19.88 |
| Total | 101,775 | 100.00 |
Source: Philadelphia City Commissioners

Justice Thomas F. Gehret retention, 2017
| Choice | Votes | % |
|---|---|---|
| For | 76,018 | 77.12 |
| Against | 22,547 | 22.88 |
| Total | 98,565 | 100.00 |
Source: Philadelphia City Commissioners

Justice Nazario Jimenez Jr. retention, 2017
| Choice | Votes | % |
|---|---|---|
| For | 75,027 | 75.94 |
| Against | 23,768 | 24.06 |
| Total | 98,795 | 100.00 |
Source: Philadelphia City Commissioners

Justice William A. Meehan Jr. retention, 2017
| Choice | Votes | % |
|---|---|---|
| For | 74,862 | 75.67 |
| Against | 24,075 | 24.33 |
| Total | 98,937 | 100.00 |
Source: Philadelphia City Commissioners

Justice Brad Moss retention, 2017
| Choice | Votes | % |
|---|---|---|
| For | 73,754 | 75.15 |
| Against | 24,383 | 24.85 |
| Total | 98,137 | 100.00 |
Source: Philadelphia City Commissioners

Justice Karen Yvette Simmons retention, 2017
| Choice | Votes | % |
|---|---|---|
| For | 77,991 | 79.23 |
| Against | 20,451 | 20.77 |
| Total | 98,442 | 100.00 |
Source: Philadelphia City Commissioners

Justice David C. Shuter retention, 2017
| Choice | Votes | % |
|---|---|---|
| For | 71,884 | 75.10 |
| Against | 23,837 | 24.90 |
| Total | 95,721 | 100.00 |
Source: Philadelphia City Commissioners

Justice Marvin L. Williams retention, 2017
| Choice | Votes | % |
|---|---|---|
| For | 65,339 | 67.81 |
| Against | 31,011 | 32.19 |
| Total | 96,350 | 100.00 |
Source: Philadelphia City Commissioners

== Ballot questions ==
Two ballot questions appeared on the primary ballot and two questions appeared on the general ballot, one of which was the statewide homestead tax constitutional amendment. All three proposed questions passed.

=== Primary election ===
Proposal 1 results by ward Yes: 50%–60%; 60%–70%; 70%–80%; 80%–90%

Proposed Charter Change 1: Base Contract Awards on the "Best Value" to the City
| Choice | Votes | % |
|---|---|---|
| For | 72,198 | 68.65 |
| Against | 32,969 | 31.35 |
| Total | 105,167 | 100.00 |
Source: Philadelphia City Commissioners

Proposal 2 results by ward Yes: 50%–60%; 60%–70%; 70%–80%; 80%–90%; No: 50%–60%

Proposed Charter Change 2: Create the Philadelphia Community Reinvestment Commission
| Choice | Votes | % |
|---|---|---|
| For | 74,156 | 70.72 |
| Against | 30,708 | 29.28 |
| Total | 104,864 | 100.00 |
Source: Philadelphia City Commissioners

=== General election ===
Bond proposal results by ward Yes: 50%–60%; 60%–70%; 70%–80%; 80%–90%; No: 50%–60%

Authorize $172 million in bonds for capital projects
| Choice | Votes | % |
|---|---|---|
| For | 98,586 | 69.20 |
| Against | 43,878 | 30.80 |
| Total | 142,464 | 100.00 |
Source: Philadelphia City Commissioners
