= 2025 Bucks County elections =

2025 Pennsylvania local election

- November 4, 2025

A general election was held in Bucks County, Pennsylvania on November 4, 2025, to elect various county-level positions. The primary election was held on May 20, 2025.

== District Attorney ==
=== Republican primary ===
==== Candidates ====
===== Nominee =====
- Jennifer Schorn, incumbent district attorney

==== Results ====
Republican primary
Party	Candidate	Votes	%
Republican	Jennifer Schorn (incumbent)	36,694	98.75
Write-in		460	1.25
Total votes		37,157	100.0

=== Democratic primary ===
==== Candidates ====
===== Nominee =====
- Joe Khan, former county solicitor and candidate for Pennsylvania Attorney General in 2024

==== Results ====
Democratic primary
Party	Candidate	Votes	%
Democratic	Joe Khan	51,213	99.46
Write-in		277	0.54
Total votes		51,490	100.0

=== General election ===
==== Polling ====
Poll source	Date(s) administered	Sample size (Note: Key: A – all adults RV – registered voters LV – likely voters V – unclear)	Margin of error	Joe Khan (D)	Jennifer Schorn (R)	Undecided
Upswing Research & Strategy (D) (Note: Poll commissioned by the Democratic PAC Bucks United)	August 5–10, 2025	501 (LV)	± 4.4%	49%	43%	8%

==== Results ====
Results by precinct Khan: 50–60%; 60–70%; 70–80%; Schorn: 50–60%; 60–70%; Tie: 50%

2025 Bucks County District Attorney election
Party	Candidate	Votes	%
Democratic	Joe Khan	128,877	54.13
Republican	Jennifer Schorn (incumbent)	109,108	45.83
Write-in		98	0.04
Total votes		238,083	100.0
Democratic gain from Republican			

== County Controller ==
=== Republican primary ===
==== Candidates ====
===== Nominee =====
- Pamela van Blunk, incumbent county controller

==== Results ====
Republican primary
Party	Candidate	Votes	%
Republican	Pamela van Blunk (incumbent)	39,072	98.90
Write-in		435	1.10
Total votes		39,507	100.0

=== Democratic primary ===
==== Candidates ====
===== Nominee =====
- Neale Dougherty, former county controller (2018–2022)

==== Results ====
Democratic primary
Party	Candidate	Votes	%
Democratic	Neale Dougherty	53,882	99.60
Write-in		219	0.40
Total votes		54,101	100.0

=== General election ===
==== Results ====
Results by precinct Dougherty: 50–60%; 60–70%; 70–80%; van Blunk: 50–60%; 60–70%; Tie: 50%

2025 Bucks County Controller election
Party	Candidate	Votes	%
Democratic	Neale Dougherty	130,061	55.53
Republican	Pamela van Blunk (incumbent)	104,031	44.42
Write-in		109	0.05
Total votes		234,201	100.0
Democratic gain from Republican			

== Sheriff ==
=== Republican primary ===
==== Candidates ====
===== Nominee =====
- Fred Harran, incumbent sheriff

==== Results ====
Republican primary
Party	Candidate	Votes	%
Republican	Fred Harran (incumbent)	39,525	98.50
Write-in		600	1.50
Total votes		40,125	100.0

=== Democratic primary ===
==== Candidates ====
===== Nominee =====
- Danny Ceisler, attorney

==== Results ====
Democratic primary
Party	Candidate	Votes	%
Democratic	Daniel Leo Ceisler	54,354	99.37
Write-in		345	0.63
Total votes		54,699	100.0

=== General election ===
==== Polling ====
Poll source	Date(s) administered	Sample size	Margin of error	Danny Ceisler (D)	Fred Harran (R)	Undecided
Upswing Research & Strategy (D)	August 5–10, 2025	501 (LV)	± 4.4%	48%	43%	9%

==== Results ====
Results by precinct Ceisler: 50%–60%; 60%–70%; 70%–80%; Harran: 50%–60%; 60%–70%

2025 Bucks County Sheriff election
Party	Candidate	Votes	%
Democratic	Daniel Leo Ceisler	131,439	55.31
Republican	Fred Harran (incumbent)	106,049	44.63
Write-in		132	0.06
Total votes		237,620	100.0
Democratic gain from Republican			

== Prothonotary ==
=== Republican primary ===
==== Candidates ====
===== Nominee =====
- Coleen Christian, incumbent prothonotary

==== Results ====
Republican primary
Party	Candidate	Votes	%
Republican	Coleen Christian (incumbent)	39,160	98.96
Write-in		412	1.04
Total votes		39,572	100.0

=== Democratic primary ===
==== Candidates ====
===== Nominee =====
- Donna Petrecco, Pennsbury School board member and candidate for state house in 2023

==== Results ====
Democratic primary
Party	Candidate	Votes	%
Democratic	Donna Petrecco	54,397	99.63
Write-in		200	0.37
Total votes		54,597	100.0

=== General election ===
==== Results ====
Results by precinct Petrecco: 50–60%; 60–70%; 70–80%; Christian: 50–60%; 60–70%

2025 Bucks County Prothonotary election
Party	Candidate	Votes	%
Democratic	Donna Petrecco	130,738	55.56
Republican	Coleen Christian (incumbent)	104,456	44.39
Write-in		107	0.05
Total votes		235,301	100.0
Democratic gain from Republican			

== Recorder of Deeds ==
=== Republican primary ===
==== Candidates ====
===== Nominee =====
- Dan McPhillips, incumbent recorder of deeds

==== Results ====
Republican primary
Party	Candidate	Votes	%
Republican	Dan McPhillips (incumbent)	39,262	98.95
Write-in		417	1.05
Total votes		39,679	100.0

=== Democratic primary ===
==== Candidates ====
===== Nominee =====
- Robin Robinson, former recorder of deeds (2018–2022)

==== Results ====
Democratic primary
Party	Candidate	Votes	%
Democratic	Robin Robinson	54,247	99.59
Write-in		223	0.41
Total votes		54,470	100.0

=== General election ===
==== Results ====
Results by precinct Robinson: 50–60%; 60–70%; 70–80%; McPhillips: 50–60%; 60–70%; Tie: 50%

2025 Bucks County Recorder of Deeds election
Party	Candidate	Votes	%
Democratic	Robin Robinson	131,456	55.81
Republican	Dan McPhillips (incumbent)	104,000	44.15
Write-in		97	0.04
Total votes		235,553	100.0
Democratic gain from Republican			

== Court of Common Pleas partisan election ==
Four seats on the Bucks County Court of Common Pleas are up for partisan election. If a candidate wins the nomination of both primaries, they are listed on the ballot under both labels, and the vote totals are combined in final reporting.

=== Democratic primary ===
==== Candidates ====
===== Nominees =====
- Linda Bobrin, incumbent Register of Wills and Clerk of the Orphans' Court
- Dawn DiDonato Burke, mediator with the Bucks County Mortgage Diversion, former prosecutor
- Amy Fitzpatrick, Bucks County solicitor
- Tiffany Thomas-Smith, family law attorney

===== Eliminated in primary =====
- Grace Deon, attorney (cross-filing)
- Gary Gambardella, Bucks County magistrate judge (cross-filing)
- Chelsey Crocker Jackman, attorney (cross-filing)
- Joseph Pizzo, attorney (cross-filing)

==== Results ====
Democratic primary (vote for up to 4)
Party	Candidate	Votes	%
Democratic	Linda Bobrin	47,713	22.38
Democratic	Dawn DiDonato Burke	44,082	20.68
Democratic	Amy Fitzpatrick	43,900	20.59
Democratic	Tiffany Thomas-Smith	43,438	20.38
Democratic	Joseph Pizzo	10,042	4.71
Democratic	Grace Deon	9,192	4.31
Democratic	Chelsey Crocker Jackman	8,787	4.12
Democratic	Gary Gambardella	5,758	2.70
Write-in		270	0.13
Total votes		213,182	100.0

=== Republican primary ===
==== Candidates ====
===== Nominees =====
- Grace Deon, president and CEO of Eastburn and Gray, P.C, largest law firm in Bucks County
- Chelsey Crocker Jackman, former Bucks County deputy district attorney
- Colin Monahan, trial attorney
- Joseph Pizzo, board president of the Bucks County Housing Development Corporation

===== Eliminated in primary =====
- Linda Bobrin, incumbent Register of Wills and Clerk of the Orphans' Court (cross-filing)
- Dawn DiDonato Burke, former prosecutor (cross-filing)
- Amy Fitzpatrick, attorney (cross-filing)
- Gary Gambardella, Bucks County magistrate judge (cross-filing)

==== Results ====
Republican primary (vote for up to 4)
Party	Candidate	Votes	%
Republican	Grace Deon	31,584	20.99
Republican	Chelsey Crocker Jackman	31,192	20.73
Republican	Joseph Pizzo	27,539	18.30
Republican	Colin Monahan	21,351	14.19
Republican	Gary Gambardella	15,961	10.61
Republican	Amy Fitzpatrick	8,720	5.80
Republican	Linda Bobrin	7,168	4.76
Republican	Dawn DiDonato Burke	6,323	4.20
Write-in		623	0.41
Total votes		150,461	100.0

=== General election ===
==== Results ====
2025 Bucks County Court of Common Pleas election (vote for up to 4)
Party	Candidate	Votes	%
Democratic	Amy Fitzpatrick	131,339	14.68
Democratic	Linda Bobrin	127,289	14.23
Democratic	Dawn DiDonato Burke	125,979	14.08
Democratic	Tiffany Thomas-Smith	123,214	13.77
Republican	Grace Deon	98,748	11.04
Republican	Joseph Pizzo	97,576	10.90
Republican	Chelsea Crocker Jackman	96,169	10.75
Republican	Colin Monahan	93,907	10.50
Write-in		596	0.07
Total votes		894,817	100.0
Democratic gain from Republican			
Democratic gain from Republican			
Democratic gain from Republican			
Democratic hold			

== Court of Common Pleas retention elections ==
=== Results ===
Judge Brian T. McGuffin retention, 2025
Choice	Votes	%
For	160,160	71.71
Against	63,178	28.29
Total	223,338	100.00
Source: Bucks County Board of Elections

Judge Raymond F. McHugh retention, 2025
Choice	Votes	%
For	167,052	75.29
Against	54,816	24.71
Total	221,868	100.00
Source: Bucks County Board of Elections
