= Oleksiak =

Oleksiak or Oleksyak (Ukrainian: Олексяк) is a gender-neutral Slavic surname. It may refer to

- Agata Oleksiak (born 1978), Polish artist known as Olek
- Jamie Oleksiak (born 1992), Canadian ice hockey player, brother of Penny
- Jerry Oleksiak (born 1952), U.S. politician
- Penny Oleksiak (born 2000), Canadian swimmer, sister of Jamie
