= Stephen Levin =

Stephen Levin may refer to:

- Stephen E. Levin (born 1932), member of the Pennsylvania House of Representatives
- Stephen Levin (politician) (born 1981), New York City councillor
- Stephen M. Levin (1941–2012), professor of occupational medicine
