= Negrin =

Negrin is a surname; notable people with this surname include:

- Alberto Negrin (born 1940), Italian film director and screenwriter
- Francisco Negrin (born 1963), Mexican-born opera director
- Hayley Faith Negrin (born 2003), American child actress
- Henriette Negrin (or Nigrin, 1877−1965), French clothes-designer and textile artist
- John Negrin (born 1989), Canadian ice hockey player
- Juan Negrín (1892–1956), Spanish politician
- Rosa Elena Simeón Negrín, Cuban politician
- Rich Negrin, American lawyer
- Sol Negrin (1929–2017), American cinematographer

See also:
