= Richard Hayden =

Richard Hayden may refer to:

- Richard Hayden (Pennsylvania politician) (born 1956), former member of the Pennsylvania House of Representatives
- Richard E. Hayden (born 1946), acoustics specialist
- Richard D. Hayden (1928–2017), member of the California legislature
- See also: Richard Haydn, British-American comedy actor
