= Pennsylvania House of Representatives, District 194 =

American legislative district

Pennsylvania's 194th State House of Representatives district
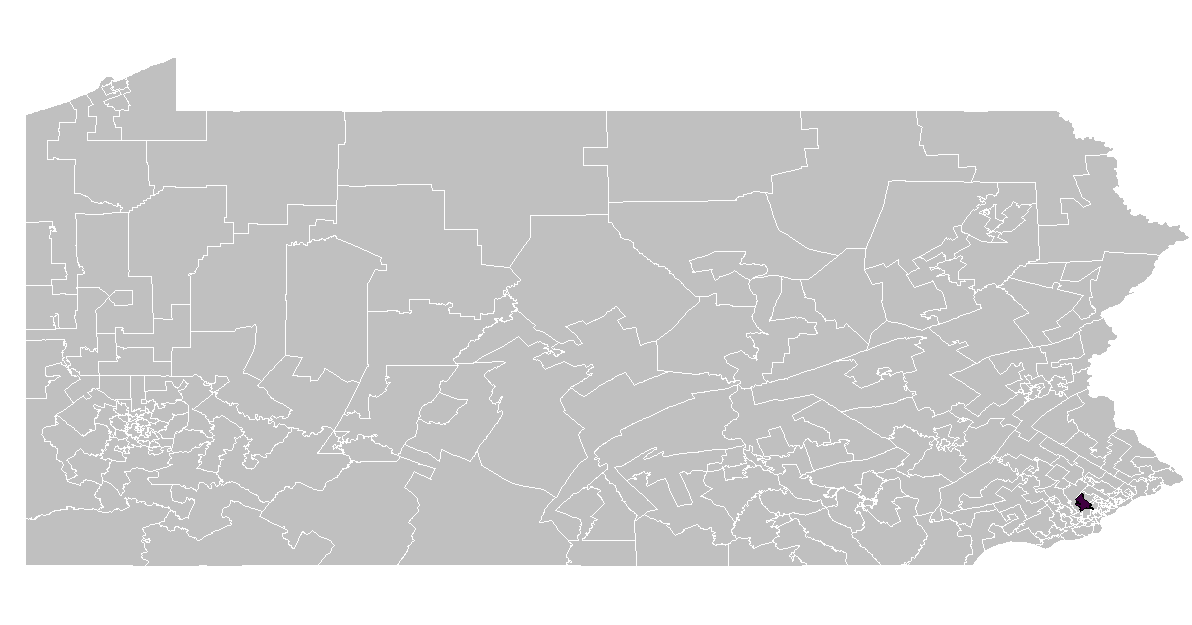
Representative
Tarik Khan; D–Philadelphia

The 194th Pennsylvania House of Representatives District is located in Montgomery County and Philadelphia County and includes the following areas:

- Montgomery County
  - Lower Merion Township (PART)
    - Ward 03
    - Ward 09
    - Ward 13 [PART, Division 03]
- Philadelphia (PART)
  - Ward 21
  - Ward 38 [PART, Divisions 01, 07, 08, 12, 13, 14, 15, 16, 19 and 20]

== Representatives ==
Representative	Party	Years	District home	Note
Prior to 1969, seats were apportioned by county.
Herbert Fineman	Democrat	1969 – 1978		Resigned May 23, 1977.
Stephen E. Levin	Democrat	1977 – 1986		Elected November 8, 1977, to fill vacancy Resigned January 6, 1986, to become Judge of Common Pleas in Philadelphia County.
Richard Hayden	Democrat	1987 – 1992		
Kathy M. Manderino	Democrat	1993 – 2010		
Pamela DeLissio	Democrat	2011 – 2023		Lost renomination
Tarik Khan	Democrat	2023 – present		Incumbent
