= Kathy Manderino =

American politician

Secretary of Labor and Industry of Pennsylvania
- In office May 13, 2015 – July 2017
- Governor: Tom Wolf
- Preceded by: Julia K. Hearthway
- Succeeded by: Jerry Oleksiak

Member of the Pennsylvania House of Representatives from the 194th district
- In office January 5, 1993 – November 30, 2010
- Preceded by: Richard Hayden
- Succeeded by: Pamela DeLissio

Personal details
- Born: October 28, 1958 (age 67) Monessen, Pennsylvania
- Party: Democratic
- Education: Pennsylvania State University, Temple University
- Profession: attorney

Kathy M. Manderino (born October 28, 1958) is a Democratic politician who serves on the Pennsylvania Gaming Control Board. She was the Secretary of the Pennsylvania Department of Labor and Industry under Governor Tom Wolf from May 2015 until August 2017. Previously, she served as a member of the Pennsylvania House of Representatives who represented the 194th District from 1993 through 2010.

== Biography ==
Manderino's father, James, was a member of the House from 1967 to 1989 and served as the 133rd Speaker of the Pennsylvania House in 1989. In 2003, the political website PoliticsPA named her as a possible successor to House Minority Leader Bill DeWeese.

In 2008, Manderino announced that she would be a candidate for Majority Leader of the House. She was defeated for the post by Todd Eachus. In 2010, Manderino announced her retirement. She was succeeded by fellow Democrat Pamela DeLissio.

In 2015, following the election of Democratic Governor Tom Wolf, Manderino was nominated to serve as Secretary of Labor and Industry of Pennsylvania. She was subsequently confirmed by the Pennsylvania State Senate in May 2015. In July 2017, Governor Wolf announced that Secretary Manderino was leaving her position at Labor and Industry to join the Pennsylvania Gaming Control Board. She has served on the Gaming Control Board since August 1, 2017.
