= Pam DeLissio =

American politician

Pam A. DeLissio

Member of the Pennsylvania House of Representatives from the 194th district
- In office January 4, 2011 – November 30, 2022
- Preceded by: Kathy Manderino
- Succeeded by: Tarik Khan

Personal details
- Born: 1956 (age 69–70) Bristol, Pennsylvania, U.S.
- Party: Democratic
- Education: Pennsylvania State University (B.S.)
- Occupation: Legislator

Pam DeLissio is an American politician from the U.S. commonwealth of Pennsylvania. A member of the Democratic Party, she was a member of the Pennsylvania House of Representatives for the 194th district, representing parts of Philadelphia and Lower Merion Township.
