= Tarik Khan =

American politician (born 1978)

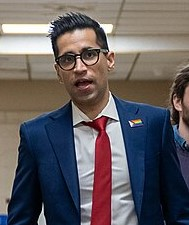

Member of the Pennsylvania House of Representatives from the 194th district
- Incumbent
- Assumed office January 3, 2023
- Preceded by: Pam DeLissio

Personal details
- Born: October 14, 1978 (age 47) Philadelphia, Pennsylvania, U.S.
- Party: Democratic
- Relations: Joe Khan (brother)
- Education: Davidson College (B.A.); Roxborough Memorial Hospital School of Nursing (GN); La Salle University (M.S.); University of Pennsylvania (PhD)
- Alma mater: Central High School of Philadelphia
- Website: www.tarikforpa.com

Tarik Khan (born October 14, 1978) is an American politician and healthcare worker. He is a current Democratic member of the Pennsylvania House of Representatives, representing the 194th District since 2023.

== Early life and education ==
Tarik Khan was born on October 14, 1978 in Philadelphia, Pennsylvania. His father Sharif Khan is a Pakistani immigrant who came to the United States in 1964 and worked as an engineer in Pennsylvania. His mother belongs to the Catholic faith. He has a brother named Joe Khan, who was Bucks County Solicitor from 2020 to 2023, and was elected Bucks County District Attorney in 2025. Tarik Khan grew up as a Muslim in the Jewish neighborhood of Bustleton, Philadelphia.

He graduated from Central High School of Philadelphia in 1996. Khan earned a Bachelor of Arts degree in English and Theater from Davidson College in 2000. He graduated from Roxborough Memorial Hospital School of Nursing as a Graduate nurse in 2003, and later earned a Master of Science degree in nursing from the School of Nursing at La Salle University. Khan earned a PhD from the University of Pennsylvania in 2022.

== Nursing career ==
Khan was a nurse at Jefferson Abington Hospital from 2005 to 2010. Between 2011 and 2014, he worked as a nurse practitioner in Washington, D.C. In 2015, Khan began working in the same role at Abbottsford-Falls Health Center in Philadelphia. During his studies at University of Pennsylvania, Khan was president of the Pennsylvania State Nurses Association.

At the onset of the COVID-19 pandemic in Philadelphia, Khan penned at op-ed in The Philadelphia Inquirer where he lamented the lack of PPE at his health center and criticized the administration of President Donald Trump for perceived inaction.

In an effort to avoid wasting COVID vaccines on the verge of expiring, Khan took it upon himself to individually visit and inoculate over 900 homebound residents in Philadelphia. Khan's delivery of "angel doses" garnered him national media attention and resulted in the establishment of a mobile vaccine clinic and more in-home inoculations. A documentary titled "Angel Dose" from filmmaker Sami Khan was also made chronicling Khan's deliveries.

== Political activities ==
Khan identifies with the progressive movement. His political activism and advocacy has included supporting the passage of the Affordable Care Act, advocating for universal pre-kindergarten in Philadelphia, and opposing the construction of a gas plant in Nicetown, Pennsylvania. Khan has also supported implementing Medicare-for-all and the Green New Deal in Pennsylvania.

In 2022, Khan defeated incumbent Pennsylvania State Representative Pam DeLissio from the 194th District in a Democratic primary challenge. He then won in the general election, defeating Libertarian nominee Torren Danowski with 90% of the vote.

Khan is both the first Pakistani-American lawmaker and first advanced practice nurse ever elected to the Pennsylvania legislature.

In 2024, Khan led a group of Pennsylvania lawmakers to propose a bill to outlaw the use of deepfakes by political campaigns.

The same year, Khan proposed legislation that would repeal laws that require abortion centers to operate within the same standards as surgical centers. He contends these laws, known as Targeted Regulation of Abortion Providers laws, or TRAP laws, are unnecessary, excessive, and only serve to close down abortion centers.

Khan co-signed a statement expressing support for pro-Palestinian student protesters and criticizing the police response to the protest encampments.

Khan called for Pennsylvania's U.S. Senators to vote against the nomination of Robert F. Kennedy Jr. as Health and Human Services secretary citing Kennedy's anti-vaccine activism and having "neither the experience nor competence to take on this immense national responsibility."

== Electoral history ==
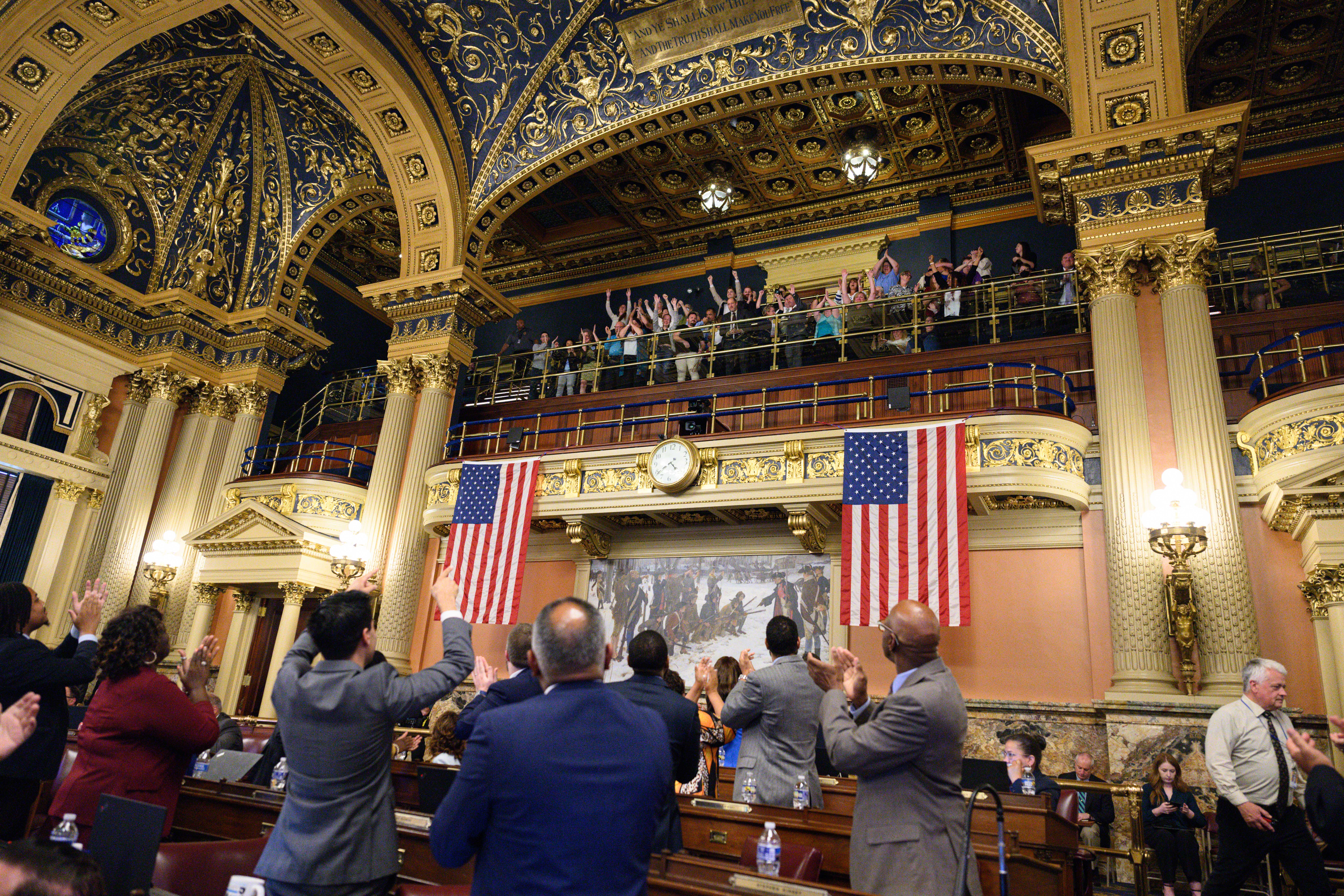
Khan with PA House colleagues acknowledging Pennsylvania nurses in the House of Representatives gallery, following the passing of the nursing safe staffing bill The Patient Safety Act (HB 106)

2022 Pennsylvania House of Representatives Democratic primary election, District 194
Party	Candidate	Votes	%
Democratic	Tarik Khan	7,475	59.47
Democratic	Pam DeLissio (incumbent)	5,076	40.39
Write-in		18	0.14
Total votes		12,569	100.00

2022 Pennsylvania House of Representatives election, District 194
Party	Candidate	Votes	%
Democratic	Tarik Khan	23,159	90.67
Libertarian	Torren Danowski	2,246	8.79
Write-in		137	0.54
Total votes		25,542	100.00

2024 Pennsylvania House of Representatives election, District 194
Party	Candidate	Votes	%
Democratic	Tarik Khan (incumbent)	29,784	98.95
Write-in		316	1.05
Total votes		30,100	100.00

== Publications ==
- Khan, Tarik S (2023). Self-Efficacy in Vulnerable Populations: Family Caregivers of Older Adults with Cognitive Impairment and Persons Experiencing Homelessness with Complex Health and Psychosocial Needs (Thesis).
- Khan, Tarik S.; Hirschman, Karen B.; McHugh, Matthew D.; Naylor, Mary D. (January 2021). "Self‐efficacy of family caregivers of older adults with cognitive impairment: A concept analysis". Nursing Forum. 56 (1): 112–126. doi:10.1111/nuf.12499. PMC 8549654. PMID 32888197.
- Khan, T. S.; Osokpo, O.; Schrand, S. (2019). "Book review of Body and Soul: The Black Panther Party and the Fight Against Medical Discrimination". Journal of Nursing Doctoral Students Scholarship. 7 (17–20).

Political offices
Pennsylvania House of Representatives
Preceded by Pam DeLissio	Member of the Pennsylvania House of Representatives from the 194th district 2023–present	Incumbent
