= William Krasner =

American novelist (1917–2003)

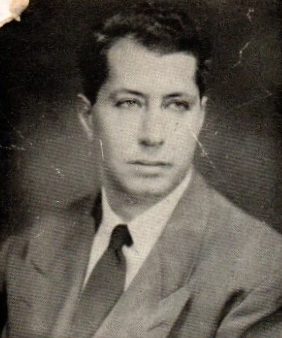
- Portrait by Philip de Woskin c. 1950
- Born: June 8, 1917; St. Louis, Missouri, U.S.
- Died: October 29, 2003 (aged 86); Bryn Mawr, Pennsylvania, U.S.
- Education: Columbia University (BA)
- Occupations: Novelist; journalist
- Spouse: Juanita Frazier (m. 1956; died 2002)
- Children: 4, including Larry

William Krasner (June 8, 1917 – October 29, 2003) was an American author and editor whose works included fiction and non-fiction.

== Life and career ==
Born in St. Louis, he was the son of Russian Jewish immigrants. He attended Soldan High School, beginning his writing career early by working on the literary magazine alongside Tennessee Williams. After high school, he worked in the U.S. Postal Service, then volunteered for the military as a Warrant Officer in the Army Air Corps. The G.I. bill enabled him to earn a bachelor's degree in psychology from Columbia University, where he also studied fiction writing under prominent Southern Agrarian novelist Caroline Gordon.

His first novel Walk the Dark Streets (1949), was nominated for an Edgar Award and was adapted as an episode of the television series Studio One in Hollywood. Its main character, lieutenant Sam Birge, would also appear in The Stag Party (1957), Death of a Minor Poet (1984) and Resort to Murder (1986). Krasner's short fiction was published in Ellery Queen's Mystery Magazine and Yank, the Army Weekly. Krasner’s novels and stories have been translated into French, Italian, Japanese, and, most extensively, German. A fifth Sam Birge novel, entitled Opfer einer Razzia (Death the Dancer)(1991) was published only in German. In 1956 he married Juanita Frazier (died 2002) of Troy, Missouri, a Methodist minister, and the couple had four sons. The family moved to the Philadelphia suburb of Berwyn, Pennsylvania, in 1969. One son is Larry Krasner, the 26th District Attorney of Philadelphia.

Raymond Chandler praised Krasner’s mystery fiction in a 1951 letter to Frederic Dannay: “[I]t may also happen that single book, such as ... Walk the Dark Streets by William Krasner ... will immediately put the writer above and beyond a whole host of writers who have written twenty or thirty books and are extremely well known and successful”. His work was also recognized by cultural critic and historian Jacques Barzun. Krasner also published two realistic urban novels, The Gambler (1950) and North of Welfare (1954) and one work of historical fiction, Francis Parkman: Dakota Legend (1982). In 1955 he received an award for literature from the National Institute of Arts and Letters (now the American Academy of Arts and Letters).

In addition to his fiction, Krasner produced an extensive non-fiction body of work. He co-wrote Drug Trip Abroad (1972), a work on drug addiction for the University of Pennsylvania, and published extensively in medical and psychological journals. He also wrote many articles for newspapers and magazines, including a feature on Father Charles Dismas Clark, SJ, for Harper’s Magazine. and a series on growing up in St. Louis in the 1930s for the St. Louis Post-Dispatch. He also wrote and produced television documentaries.

Krasner died from a heart attack at Bryn Mawr Hospital on October 29, 2003, at the age of 86. His papers are now housed in the Howard Gotlieb Archival Research Center at Boston University and in the Special Collections Department at Washington University in St. Louis.

== Bibliography ==
=== Fiction ===
- "All in the Day's Work." Ellery Queen's Mystery Magazine November 1953.
- Death of a Minor Poet. New York: Scribner, 1984.
- Francis Parkman: Dakota Legend. Wayne, PA: Dell/Banbury, 1982.
- The Gambler. New York: Harper 1950. New York: Bantam, 1952. New York: Harper Perennial, 1987.
- "An Hour Between Trains." Yank, the Service Magazine. 1943.
- North of Welfare. New York: Harper 1957.
- Resort to Murder. New York: Scribner, 1986.
- The Stag Party. New York: Harper, 1957. New York: Bantam, 1958.
- Walk the Dark Streets. New York: Harper, 1949. New York: Bantam, 1950. New York: MacMillan, 1985.

=== Foreign editions ===
- Auf dunklen Strassen. Hamburg: Rowohlt, 1989.
- Blackout! Hamburg: Rowohlt 1990.
- “En El Trabajo Cotidiono.” Selecciones Elley Queen De Cremin Y Ysterioso. Santiago: Zig-Zag, 1954.
- Tod eines Bohemien. Hamburg: Rowohlt, 1990.
- La Rue Sans Fin. Paris: Less Presses de la Citee, 1949.
- La Strada Oscura. Milan: Langoneri & Co., 1953.
- Opfer einer Razzia. Hamburg: Rowohlt 1991.
- Tat des Mr. Goodman. Hamburg: Rowohlt 1991.
- The Stag Party. Tokyo: Sogen Sha, 1957.
- “Tutto Il Lavoro Di Una Giornata.” I Gialli Di Ellery Queen. Milan: Garzanti, 1954.

=== Non-fiction ===
- “Before Gaslight Square Days: How Young St. Louis Bohemians Studied “Life” In the 1930s.” St. Louis Post-Dispatch May 28, 1961.
- Children at Risk ( with Vivan R. Isenstein). Washington: National Institute of Mental Health. 1978.
- Children's Play and Social Speech. An NIMH Program Report. Washington: National Institute of Mental Health, 1975.
- Drug Trip Abroad:American Drug Refugees in Amerstdam.(with Walter R. Cuskey and Arnold William Klein) Philadelphia: University of Pennsylvania Press, 1982.
- “The Eyes of the Beholder: The Drug Addict as Criminal, Patient or Victim” (with Walter R. Cuskey). Contemporary Drug Problems, 1973.
- “Hoodlum Priest and Respectable Convicts” Harper’s, Feb 1961. p. 57-62
- “Juvenile Delinquents of an Earlier Age: The Story of Two Tough Guys and Why They Wouldn’t Take Off Their Sweaters.” St. Louis Post-Dispatch September 8, 1961.
- Labeling the Children (with Jane R. Mercer). Washington: US Department of Health Education and Welfare, 1977
- “The Needle and the Boot: Heroin Maintenance”(with Walter R. Cuskey) Society 10.4: 1973. 45–52
- “ St. Louis College Youths Learned About Life as Chorus Boys in Aida.” St. Louis Post-Dispatch July 16, 1961.
- Training Foster Parents to Serve Dependent Children (with Vivian R. Isenstein). An NIMH Program Report. Washington: National Institute of Mental Health, 1978.
- Victims of Rape. Washington: National Institute of Mental Health, 1977.
- “Why Fiction is Really Truth: It Enables One Man to Stand in Another’s Shoes.” St. Louis Post-Dispatch April 8, 1962.
