= Danny Ceisler =

American attorney and sheriff

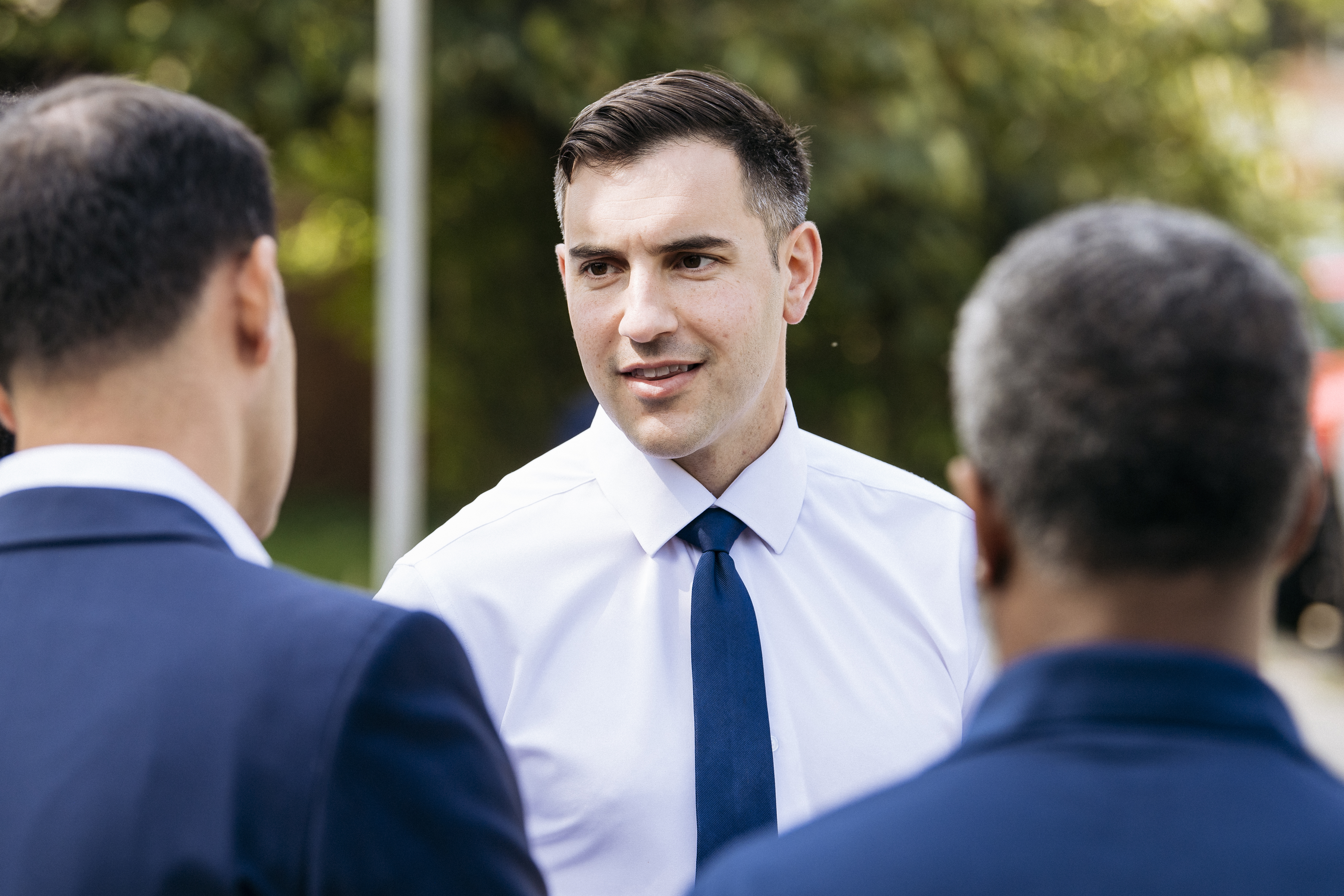
- Ceisler speaking with police officers

Bucks County Sheriff
- Incumbent
- Assumed office January 5, 2026
- Preceded by: Fred Harran

Personal details
- Born: June 15, 1992 (age 34)
- Party: Democratic
- Education: George Washington University; Temple University Beasley School of Law

Daniel Leo Ceisler (born 1992) is an American attorney, military officer, and politician who has served as the sheriff of Bucks County, Pennsylvania since 2026. A member of the Democratic Party, he was first elected in 2025.

== Life ==
=== Early life and military career ===
At the age of 18, Ceisler joined the United States Army through the Reserve Officers' Training Corps (ROTC) program at Georgetown University, becoming a second lieutenant. In 2016, Ceisler deployed to Afghanistan, where he served with the Joint Special Operations Command Counterterrorism Task Force. He was awarded the Bronze Star Medal for his service in theater.

He continued his service in the Army Reserve, attaining the rank of captain. Between 2020 and 2021, he was mobilized to serve on three crisis management teams at the Pentagon, addressing the COVID-19 pandemic, domestic civil unrest, and the security response following the January 6 United States Capitol attack. He ran for Bucks County District Attorney in 2021, but suspended his campaign after being activated to serve on the Domestic Unrest Crisis Management Team at the Pentagon.

=== Legal career ===
Ceisler earned his Juris Doctor from the Temple University Beasley School of Law. During his studies, he worked at the Philadelphia District Attorney's Office, where he received a state certification to prosecute cases and rotated through the municipal court, juvenile, and charging units.

After being admitted to the bar, Ceisler joined Saltz Mongeluzzi & Bendesky, a Philadelphia trial firm. While at the firm, he helped lead national litigation against firearms manufacturer SIG Sauer, representing law enforcement officers who alleged they were shot by their own holstered weapons due to a missing safety feature.

=== Shapiro administration ===
In 2023, Ceisler was appointed as a senior public safety official in the administration of Pennsylvania Governor Josh Shapiro. In this role, he led initiatives to improve emergency response in Pennsylvania, including creating a mutual aid system for local governments during disasters, developing AI tools for first responders, and launching a grant program to support disaster survivors. He also oversaw the creation of the Keystone First Responder Award, which recognizes first responders who suffered career-ending injuries or were killed in the line of duty.

=== Bucks County Sheriff ===
==== 2025 election ====
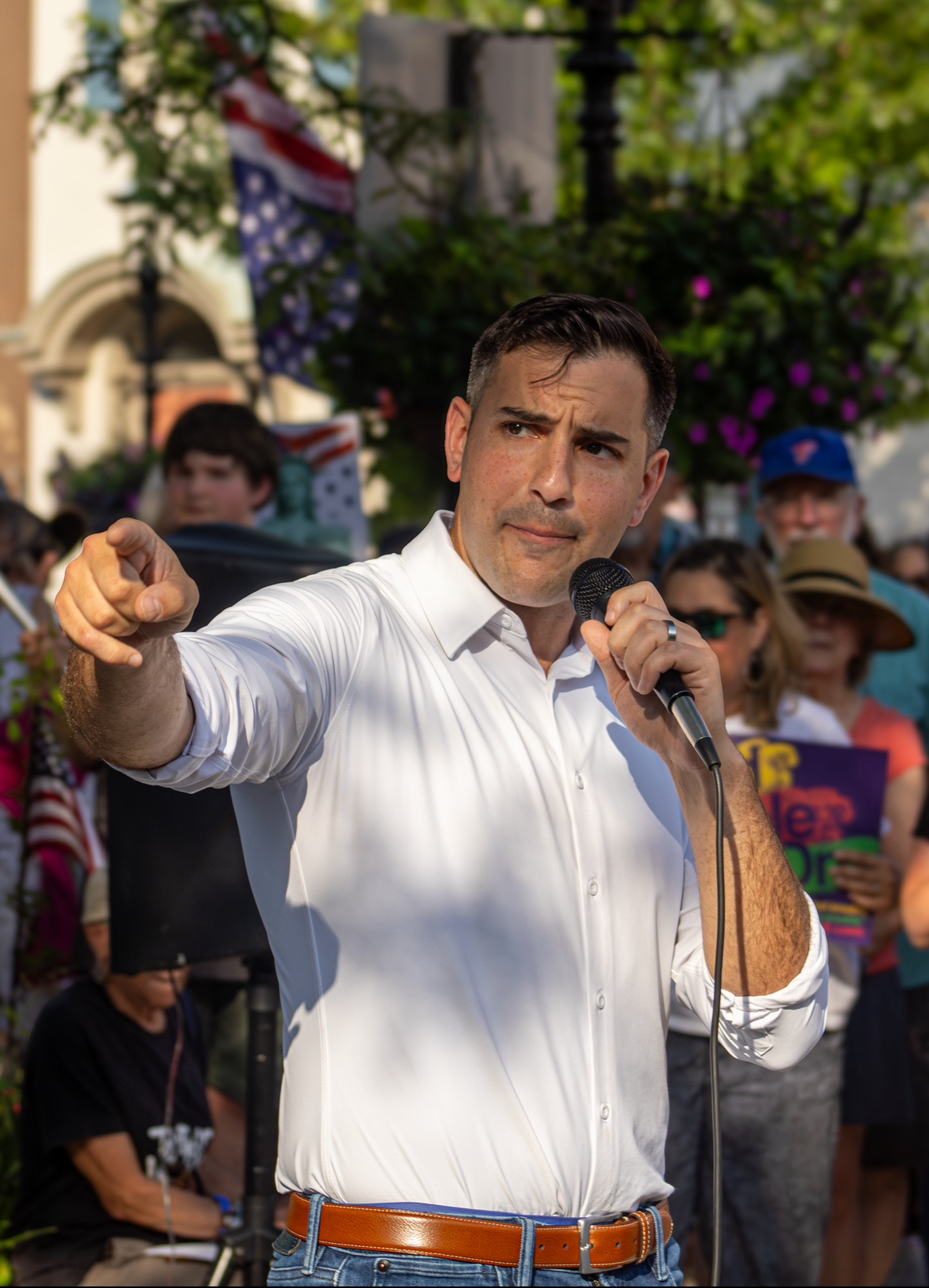
Danny Ceisler giving a speech during his 2025 campaign for Sheriff

Ceisler announced his bid for sheriff of Bucks County in March 2025. He won the endorsement of the Bucks County Democratic Committee that same month. After incumbent Republican sheriff Fred Harran worked to partner with the United States Immigration and Customs Enforcement (ICE), Ceisler attacked Harran for those connections. Harran had signed his deputies up to help ICE with federal immigration laws. His proposal was initially overturned by Bucks County commissioners, but a judge ruled that the commission did not have the authority to do so. His goal with the campaign was to take politics out of public safety.

Ceisler defeated Harran on November 4, 2025, with over 55% of the vote. With his victory, he became the second youngest sheriff in the state, at 33 years old.

==== Tenure ====
Ceisler was sworn in at the Bristol Riverside Theatre on January 5, 2026.

On January 14, 2026, Ceisler signed an order formally terminating his office's 287(g) partnership with ICE. Ceisler signed an additional order prohibiting deputies from inquiring about the immigration status of crime victims, eyewitnesses, or court observers. Ceisler confirmed that his orders did not make Bucks County as "sanctuary county," and that the county Department of Corrections would continue to grant ICE access to the county jail to ensure convicted criminals could be safely deported. In a press conference announcing the decision, Ceisler stated that the new policies were made in conjunction with local police chiefs and immigrant leaders to strike the proper balance between "protecting the community from crime, and protecting the community from fear."

== Personal life ==
Ceisler is married to attorney, Helen Lawless, and they live in Bristol Borough. He is also a co-owner of Naked Brewing Company.
