= Robin Rosenthal =

American politician and influencer

Robin Robinson
- Robin Rosenthal

Bucks County Recorder of Deeds
- Incumbent
- Assumed office January 5, 2026
- Preceded by: Dan McPhillips
- In office 2018–2022
- Preceded by: Joe Szafran
- Succeeded by: Dan McPhillips

Personal details
- Party: Democratic
- Education: San Diego State University

Robin Rosenthal, also known by her professional and maiden name Robin Robinson, is an American social media influencer and politician based in Pennsylvania. She is best known for her social media channel Itstherosenthals, where she and her children take an "irreverent approach to grief". She is currently serving her second nonconsecutive term as Recorder of Deeds of Bucks County, Pennsylvania, which she began on January 5, 2026.

== Biography ==
Rosenthal attended San Diego State University, where she studied communications and was a cheerleader for the San Diego State Aztecs. She graduated in 1976.

She worked at a title agency before working as Bucks County Jury Commissioner and then as executive assistant to Bucks County Commissioner Diane Ellis-Marseglia. She spent ten years working for the Commissioners' Office in Bucks County. In 2010, her husband, Mark, died of a heart attack.

She was elected to the position of Bucks County Recorder of Deeds in November 2017 and was sworn in on January 2, 2018. She worked on the digitization and preservation of hundreds of deed books, some dating back to the 17th century, and created a county fraud alert program. She also led a "Did You Know?" social media series during the COVID-19 pandemic sharing more than 60 historical stories of properties and people in the county. She ran for re-election in 2021, but lost re-election to Dan McPhillips. Following this, she worked as a realtor.

She returned to using her married name Robin Rosenthal when she began the social media channel Itstherosenthals with her two children, Emma and Sam. The channel emphasized coping with grief, specifically around the death of Rosenthal's husband Mark, through laughter. Their first viral video involved Rosenthal throwing fries on Mark's grave. As of 2025, they had 1.7 million TikTok followers. In 2025, they were short-listed for Most Viral Video in the Webby Awards.

She appeared in only flesh-colored shapewear, giving her the appearance of being nude, to promote voting by mail in Bucks County in the 2024 United States presidential election.

In 2025, she ran for the position of Bucks County Recorder of Deeds once again, and faced no primary opposition. She promoted her candidacy through a variety of means, including an Instagram post on Itstherosenthals. She defeated McPhillips in November 2025, during what was described as a "Blue Wave", and was sworn in on January 5, 2026.
