= Jerry Oleksiak =

American politician

Secretary of Labor and Industry of Pennsylvania
- In office September 5, 2017 – December 4, 2020
- Governor: Tom Wolf
- Preceded by: Kathy Manderino
- Succeeded by: Jennifer Berrier

Personal details
- Born: Philadelphia, Pennsylvania
- Party: Democratic
- Education: Saint Joseph's University
- Profession: Teacher

W. Gerard "Jerry" Oleksiak (born c. 1952) is a Democratic politician who served as the Secretary of the Pennsylvania Department of Labor and Industry under Governor Tom Wolf from 2017 until his retirement in December 2020.

Oleksiak was born and raised in Philadelphia. He graduated with a degree in international relations from Saint Joseph's University in 1974. Oleksiak later earned a master's degree in Education from Saint Joseph's. Oleksiak was a special education teacher in the Upper Merion Area School District for over three decades. He served as Pennsylvania State Education Association (PSEA) vice president, treasurer, and as a member of the board of directors. He became president of the PSEA in 2015.

In August 2017, Wolf nominated Oleksiak as the Secretary of Labor and Industry following the resignation of Kathy Manderino. Several Senate Republicans expressed reservations about Oleksiak, however he became the secretary automatically in January 2018 due to the state Senate's refusal to act on his nomination. He became the first Pennsylvania Cabinet secretary to take office without Senate approval. Oleksiak joined the Department following a performance audit that showed almost $180 million in taxpayer dollars was spent under his leadership of Manderino on a botched modernization project for unemployment compensation. Due to a struggle of the providing of additional funding, several centers were closed and workers laid off until a bill was passed in 2017. The unemployment system was severely backlogged during the 2020 coronavirus pandemic, and Oleksiak stated "We are just going to keep plugging away to reduce that backlog." Part of the problem was due to low staffing in the department due to previous low levels of unemployment claims. By his own count, the Department processed 98 percent of claims, but as many as 30,000 Pennsylvanians still had not received Pandemic Unemployment Compensation months after submitting claims. Despite Oleksiak saying that staff has been added to try to address ongoing customer service issues, the phone lines and online chat features remain mostly ineffective and inaccessible continuing to cause many Pennsylvanians frustration.

Oleksiak lives in Glenside, Pennsylvania with his wife. He has three children and two grandchildren.
