= Stephen E. Levin =

American politician

Member of the Pennsylvania House of Representatives from the 194th district
- In office 1977 – January 6, 1986
- Preceded by: Herbert Fineman
- Succeeded by: Richard Hayden

Personal details
- Born: June 3, 1932 (age 94) Philadelphia, Pennsylvania
- Party: Democratic

Stephen E. Levin (born June 3, 1932) is a former Democratic member of the Pennsylvania House of Representatives. He earned a BS in Economics in 1953 and an LLB in 1958 from The University of Pennsylvania. He served in the US Army from 1953 to 1955.

Levin was first elected on November 8, 1977 and served five terms, ending with the 1985-86 session. He later served as a Judge of Common Pleas in Philadelphia County.
