= Teresa Carr Deni =

American judge

Teresa Carr Deni is a lawyer, politician, and former judge in Philadelphia. From 1995 to 2016, she was a judge in the Philadelphia Municipal Court. In her first 12 years on the bench, she disposed hundreds of cases per year. Lawyers who appeared before her gave her a 90% approval rating. She earned the endorsement of the Philadelphia Bar Association for her Retention Election. Prior to becoming a judge, she chaired the Criminal Justice Section of the Philadelphia Bar Association. She participated in forming "Lawyers Concerned for Lawyers," which offers support to attorneys overcoming addictions. In December, 2016, she resigned to run for District Attorney of Philadelphia. She is a single adoptive mother of two sons.

Before graduating as president of her class at Temple University School of Law in 1985, she was employed at the Board of Revision of Taxes and the Mayor's Office of Housing and Community Development. She opened her law practice in 1986. After ten years of practice, she was elected to the Municipal Court for six years and won retention for three additional six-year terms.

Before attending law school, Teresa Deni co-founded Alexandria Books, a feminist bookstore, and HERA, a feminist newspaper, to inform Philadelphians about the women's movement in the city, country and around the world.

== Controversy ==
A 2007 case before Deni involved a 20-year-old prostitute who alleged that she was sexually assaulted by Dominique Gindraw and at least four other men. She agreed to have sex with Gindraw for $150 after contacting him through Craigslist.

Upon meeting him, he asked her to also have sex with his friend for an additional $100. She reported that when the other man arrived, he threatened her with a gun and demanded that she have sex with two additional men.

After a police report was filed, Gindraw was arrested and charged with rape and assault. Deni dismissed the rape charge and held the robbery and other charges for court. She explained her decision by stating:

"She consented but she didn't get paid . . . I thought it was a robbery." And that a case like this "minimizes true rape cases and demeans women who are really raped."

Assistant district attorney Rich DeSipio responded by refusing to present a second case involving the defendant before Deni owing to the ruling, arguing that "I wouldn't demean her [the victim] that way." DeSipio complained to columnist Jill Porter and withdrew the case. He later submitted it before a different judge who held it for court.

Subsequently, a complaint was filed against Judge Deni by an anonymous person. After review, however, that complaint was dismissed. DeSipio denied that he initiated contact with the columnist. Subsequently, Judge Deni filed a Disciplinary Complaint against DeSipio, citing Professional Conduct Rule 3.6, stating, "The prosecutor, unhappy with the Court's decision at a Preliminary Hearing, took his complaints to Daily News Columnist...in an attempt to materially prejudice an adjudicative proceeding in which he participated and that he is resubmitting before another judge."

Subsequently, the newly elected Chancellor of the local Bar Association, Jane Dalton, denounced Deni. She said Judge Deni had committed an "unforgivable miscarriage of justice" and "clear disregard of the legal definition of rape and the rule of law." Dalton commented, "I have personally reviewed the transcript from the defendant's preliminary hearing in this case. Based on my reading, the transcript clearly reflects that the victim decided she was not going to engage in sex with any of the men present, and that she was forced to do so at gunpoint. No one has denied or contradicted this. Judge Deni's belief that because the victim had originally intended to have sex for money and decided not to because she didn't get paid posits that a woman cannot change her mind about having sex, or withdraw her consent to do so, regardless of the circumstances. [...] I am personally offended by this unforgivable miscarriage of justice. The victim has been brutalized twice in this case: first by the assailants, and now by the court." Judicial Rules prohibit Judges from responding.

In 2020, Deni lowered the bail from $100,000 to $20,000 for Davis Josephus, a repeat violent offender who was charged on February 19, 2020 with 11 counts, including kidnapping for ransom, robbery, car theft, firearms violations and other charges. On December 29, 2020, Josephus posted the required 10% of the sum – just $2,000. Weeks later, Josephus was arrested and charged with the January 13, 2021 murder of 25 year old Milan Loncar, who was walking his dog in the Brewerytown section of Philadelphia. Deni was criticized by Philadelphia assistant DA Larry Krasner and Philadelphia Police Department Inspector Derrick Wood for the decision to reduce bail and release a violent offender without regard for the safety of the community. Krasner is on record noting that his office objected to the reduction in bail, and Judge Deni chose to ignore their objections.
