= Richard Hayden (Pennsylvania politician) =

American politician (born 1956)

Member of the Pennsylvania House of Representatives from the 194th district
- In office 1987–1992
- Preceded by: Stephen Levin
- Succeeded by: Kathy Manderino

Personal details
- Born: July 25, 1956 (age 69) Philadelphia, Pennsylvania
- Party: Democratic

Richard Hayden (born July 25, 1956) is a former Democratic member of the Pennsylvania House of Representatives. He was born in Philadelphia.
