= Joe Khan =

American politician and prosecutor

Bucks County District Attorney
- Incumbent
- Assumed office January 5, 2026
- Preceded by: Jennifer Schorn

Bucks County Solicitor
- In office January 6, 2020 – April 2023
- Preceded by: Michael Klimpl
- Succeeded by: Amy Fitzpatrick

Personal details
- Born: 1975 or 1976 (age 49–50)
- Party: Democratic
- Education: Swarthmore College; University of Chicago Law School

Joe Khan (born 1975 or 1976) is an American politician and prosecutor who has served as the Bucks County District Attorney since 2026. He previously served as the Bucks County Solicitor from 2020 to 2023 and unsuccessfully ran election campaigns to be District Attorney of Philadelphia and the Pennsylvania Attorney General.

== Early career ==
Khan spent his early career working in the Philadelphia District Attorney's office, before moving to the United States Attorney's office. In the U.S. Attorney's office, he worked to fight crime and corruption.

== Political career ==
=== 2017 Philadelphia District Attorney election ===
Khan launched his campaign to be the next District Attorney of Philadelphia in September 2016. He campaigned on progressive values, such as handling overspending on low-level drug possession cases. He had raised over $200,000 by January 1, 2017. The ideas he campaigned on were similar to two of his primary opponents, Larry Krasner and Michael Untermeyer. Krasner went on to win the primary, and Khan finished in second with around 20% of the vote.

=== Bucks County Solicitor ===
Khan was first appointed as the Bucks County Solicitor on January 6, 2020. Amidst Republican Party efforts to disrupt the 2024 United States presidential election, the Donald Trump campaign attempted to block county officials from notifying voters that their mail-in ballots were being challenged on election day. Khan worked to oppose the lawsuit and the case was thrown out on November 4, 2020. In 2021, he worked to help certain criminal offenders clear their record through an expungement program at the Bucks County Public Defender's Office. The Pennsylvania Bar Association named him the government lawyer of the year in 2022. He resigned in April 2023 to return to private law practice.

=== 2024 Pennsylvania Attorney General election ===
It was speculated that Khan was considering a run for Pennsylvania Attorney General in December 2022. He officially launched his bid to be the Democratic nominee on June 7, 2023. He ran on his record as a prosecutor, stating that "public safety will be a top issue in this race." He finished in third, behind Eugene DePasquale. He received 16% of the vote.

=== Bucks County District Attorney ===
==== Election ====
Khan announced his bid to unseat incumbent Republican district attorney Jennifer Schorn in March 2025. He received the support of the Bucks County Democratic Committee. He ran unopposed in the Democratic primary and became the party's nominee on May 20, 2025. He has criticized Schorn for her handling of abuse allegations at a local elementary school. He defeated Schorn in the general election on November 4, 2025.

==== Tenure ====
Khan was sworn in on January 5, 2026.

== Personal life ==
His brother, Tarik, is a member of the Pennsylvania House of Representatives.
