= Rich Negrin =

American lawyer

Pennsylvania Secretary of Environmental Protection
- In office June 27, 2023 – December 9, 2023
- Governor: Josh Shapiro
- Preceded by: Patrick McDonnell
- Succeeded by: Jess Shirley (Interim Acting)

Personal details
- Party: Democratic
- Education: Wagner College (BS); Rutgers Law School (JD)

Rich Negrin is an American lawyer who formerly served as Pennsylvania Secretary of Environmental Protection from June to December 2023.

== Biography ==
The son of Cuban immigrants, Negrin was 13 when he witnessed the assassination of his father, the director of a refugee services center in New Jersey, by anti-Castro activists. After graduating from Wagner College and Rutgers Law School, he worked as a prosecutor in the Philadelphia District Attorney's office from 1995 to 2000.

Under Mayor Michael Nutter, Negrin was appointed executive director of the Philadelphia Board of Revision of Taxes in 2009 and then the city's managing director and deputy mayor in 2010. He unsuccessfully ran for district attorney in 2017, receiving endorsements from The Philadelphia Inquirer and the Fraternal Order of Police. He received 14.2% of the vote in the Democratic primary, placing third behind Larry Krasner and Joe Khan.

In January 2023, Negrin was nominated as Secretary of the Pennsylvania Department of Environmental Protection by Governor Josh Shapiro. He was confirmed by the Pennsylvania State Senate on June 27, becoming the first Latino to lead the agency. He announced resignation, effective December 9, on October 25, 2023, for medical reasons.

== Electoral history ==
Philadelphia District Attorney Democratic primary election, 2017
| Party | Candidate | Votes | % |
|---|---|---|---|
| Democratic | Larry Krasner | 59,368 | 38.24 |
| Democratic | Joe Khan | 31,480 | 20.28 |
| Democratic | Rich Negrin | 22,048 | 14.20 |
| Democratic | Tariq Karim El-Shabazz | 18,040 | 11.62 |
| Democratic | Michael W. Untermeyer | 12,709 | 8.19 |
| Democratic | John O'Neill | 9,246 | 5.96 |
| Democratic | Teresa Carr Deni | 2,335 | 1.50 |
| Write-in | | 20 | 0.01 |
| Total votes | | 155,246 | 100.00 |
