= Larry Krasner =

American lawyer (born 1961)

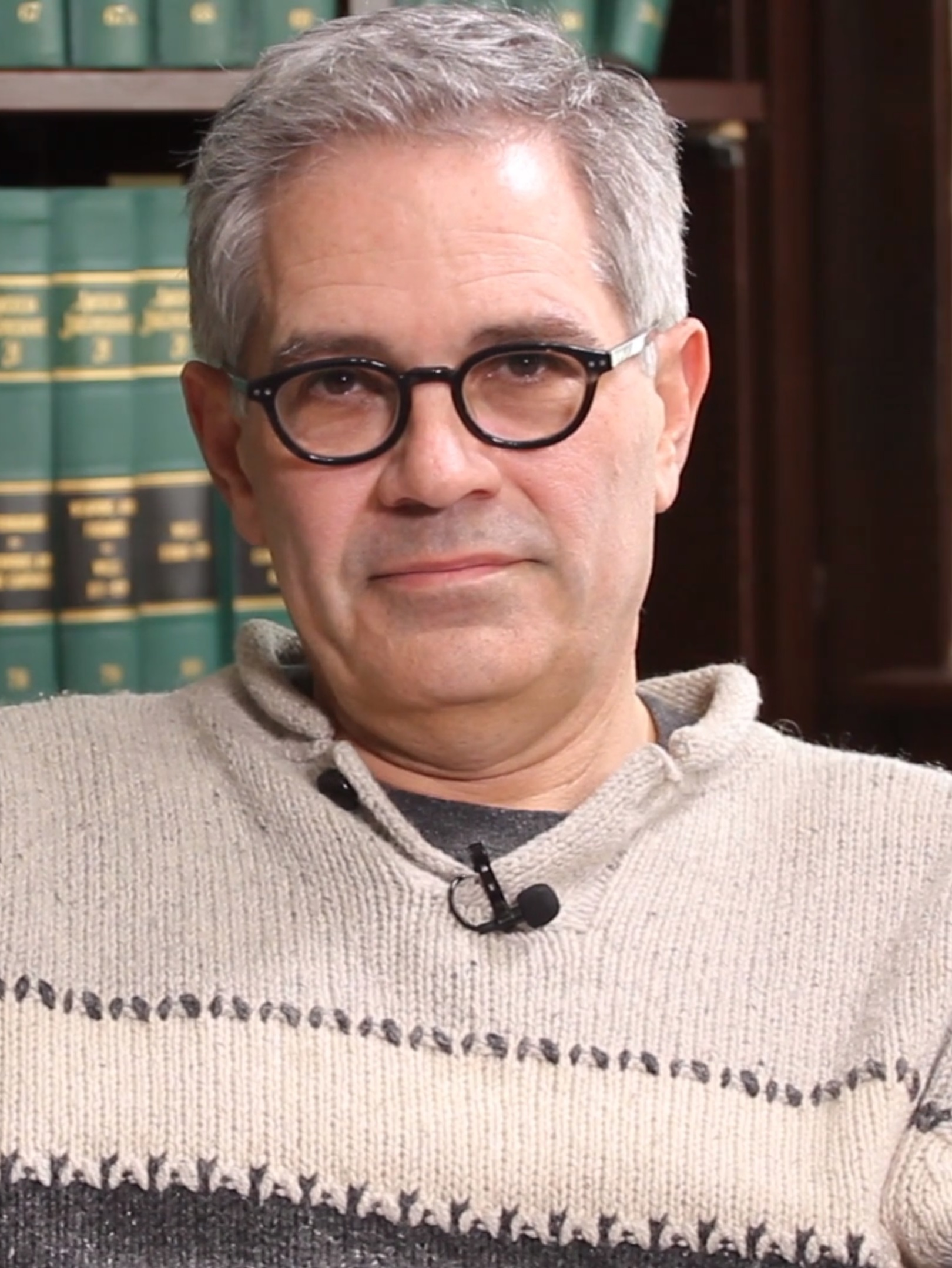

26th District Attorney of Philadelphia
- Incumbent
- Assumed office January 1, 2018
- Preceded by: Kelley B. Hodge (acting)

Personal details
- Born: Lawrence Samuel Krasner; March 30, 1961 (age 65) St. Louis, Missouri, U.S.
- Party: Democratic
- Spouse: Lisa Rau
- Education: University of Chicago (BA); Stanford University (JD)

Lawrence Samuel Krasner (born March 30, 1961) is an American attorney who has served as the 26th District Attorney of Philadelphia since 2018. Krasner was one of the first U.S. district attorney candidates to run as a self-described "progressive prosecutor". He campaigned on a platform to reform elements of the criminal justice system and to reduce incarceration.

First elected to the position in 2017, Krasner was re-elected to a second term in 2021 and a third term in 2025. Krasner's policies include ending criminal charges against those caught with marijuana possession, ending cash bail for those accused of some misdemeanors and nonviolent felonies, reducing supervision for parolees, and seeking more lenient sentences for certain crimes. During his time in office, he has pursued police misconduct and advocated for greater police accountability.

Krasner has served as a polarizing figure in Philadelphia politics, with supporters crediting Krasner for the city's reduction in homicides throughout his tenure, while opponents have argued his policies are "soft on crime". In 2022, Krasner was impeached by the Pennsylvania House of Representatives on multiple counts; several counts related to various alleged "dereliction[s] of duty" and "misbehavior[s] in office", and another alleged that Krasner had attempted to obstruct the legislative probe that led to his impeachment. After an impeachment trial was indefinitely postponed, the Supreme Court of Pennsylvania ruled that the articles of impeachment had expired in 2024. In 2026, the Supreme Court of Pennsylvania ruled that Krasner's Philadelphia District Attorney’s Office "has repeatedly lacked candor to the court, misrepresented facts, failed to conduct adequate investigations, and inexplicably dodged necessary evidentiary hearings." This 2026 decision resulted in the Pennsylvania Attorney General being given the authority to veto attempts by Krasner's office to undo previous convictions.

== Early life, education, and career ==
Krasner was born in St. Louis in 1961. His father, William Krasner, was the son of Russian Jewish immigrants and an author of crime fiction, and his mother, Juanita Frazier, was an evangelical Christian minister. Krasner graduated from Conestoga High School in Tredyffrin Township, Pennsylvania, in 1979. He received a bachelor's degree from the University of Chicago in 1983, and a Juris Doctor from Stanford Law School in 1987.

Following his law graduation and bar passage, Krasner returned to Philadelphia and became a public defender. He opened his law firm in 1993 and worked as a criminal defense lawyer in Philadelphia for 30 years, specializing in civil rights and frequently representing protestors pro bono. After the 2000 Republican National Convention (RNC), Krasner represented some of the 400 protestors arrested at the time, most of whom were acquitted.

== Philadelphia District Attorney ==
=== Elections ===
==== 2017 ====
Philadelphia district attorney R. Seth Williams announced in February 2017 that he would not run for reelection. Williams resigned from office and pleaded guilty to federal bribery charges in June 2017; his interim replacement, Kathleen Martin, chose not to run.

Shortly before Krasner announced his candidacy, John McNesby, president of Lodge 5 of the Philadelphia Fraternal Order of Police, derided Krasner's intention to enter the race as "hilarious". Krasner ran his campaign on a platform to eliminate cash bail, address police misconduct and end mass incarceration.

Krasner's representation of Black Lives Matter and Occupy Philadelphia members led many to call him an "anti-establishment" candidate during the Democratic primary campaign. He campaigned against existing policies that had resulted in disproportionately high numbers of minority males being jailed. Krasner was a featured speaker at the 2017 People's Summit.

Krasner won the May 16, 2017, Democratic primary with 38% of the vote, defeating former city and federal prosecutor Joe Khan, former Philadelphia Managing Director Rich Negrin, former First Assistant District Attorney Tariq El-Shabazz, former prosecutor Michael Untermeyer, former prosecutor Jack O'Neill, and former Municipal Court Judge Teresa Carr Deni. City officials reported voter turnout spiked nearly 50 percent compared to 2009, which was the last contested race for district attorney of Philadelphia.

The primary was widely seen as a proxy election; the winner of the Democratic primary election is the presumptive victor of the general election since Philadelphia has almost seven times as many registered Democrats as registered Republicans. As expected, the November general election was not competitive, with Krasner winning almost three times as many votes as his Republican opponent, former assistant district attorney Beth Grossman.

==== 2021 ====
In his 2021 campaign for re-election, Krasner faced Carlos Vega in the Democratic primary. Vega was fired by Krasner from the Philadelphia DA office when Krasner began implementing reforms within the office. Vega, as a prosecutor, was involved in retrying Anthony Wright on rape and murder charges even after DNA evidence showed another man had committed the crime.

In the lead-up to the primary, the Philadelphia Fraternal Order of Police instructed its members to switch party affiliation to the Democratic party so that they could vote for Krasner's opponent. The top spender in the campaign was a political action committee formed by retired cops. During the campaign, Krasner's opponents argued that his criminal justice reform policies had contributed to an increase in violent crime; however, criminal justice experts said there was no evidence to substantiate this claim.

On May 18, the Associated Press called the primary for Krasner, leading 65% to 35% with 22% of the votes counted. Reporting cited a coalition of predominantly African-American wards and progressive activist groups as helping to overcome his lack of support from the local Democratic Party.

In the general election on November 2, Krasner won against his Republican opponent, Chuck Peruto, 71.8% to 27.9%.

==== 2025 ====
On February 18, 2025, Krasner officially launched his bid for a third term as Philadelphia District Attorney. He was challenged in the Democratic primary by Patrick Dugan, a 17-year Philadelphia Municipal Court judge who quit in 2024 to run for the office. Dugan, previously known for establishing diversion courts, argued the justice system had "tilted too far toward leniency" and campaigned for a "tougher approach", reprising a similar dynamic from the last two election campaigns featuring Krasner.

Dugan outraised Krasner by approximately $400,000 in the primary, securing over $900,000 (much from the constituent labor unions of the Philadelphia Building and Construction Trades Council) to Krasner's approximately $500,000. Despite this and the city's Democratic Party declining to endorse him, Krasner won the May 20, 2025, Democratic primary, earning 64% of the vote to Dugan's 35%.

Although Dugan lost in the Democratic primary, a campaign organized by Republicans encouraging GOP primary voters to write in his name garnered him over 6,000 votes, qualifying him as the Republican nominee. Immediately after the primary, Dugan said he would not run as a Republican, but in August "reversed course", and appeared on the general election ballot as the Republican candidate. He stated he could not "stand by and allow Mr. Krasner's failed policies to continue to hold our city hostage". This move drew "angry condemnations" from Democratic leaders including Philadelphia Democratic Party chair Bob Brady and caused a former core Dugan supporter, Building Trades Council leader Ryan Boyer, to switch his endorsement to Krasner.

The general election campaign was described as a "muted affair", with no debates, little money raised, and Krasner holding "apparently no campaign events". Dugan received a last-minute endorsement from the Fraternal Order of Police.

In the November 5 general election, Krasner again defeated Dugan by a wide margin, winning 76% of the vote, to secure his third term.

=== Tenure ===
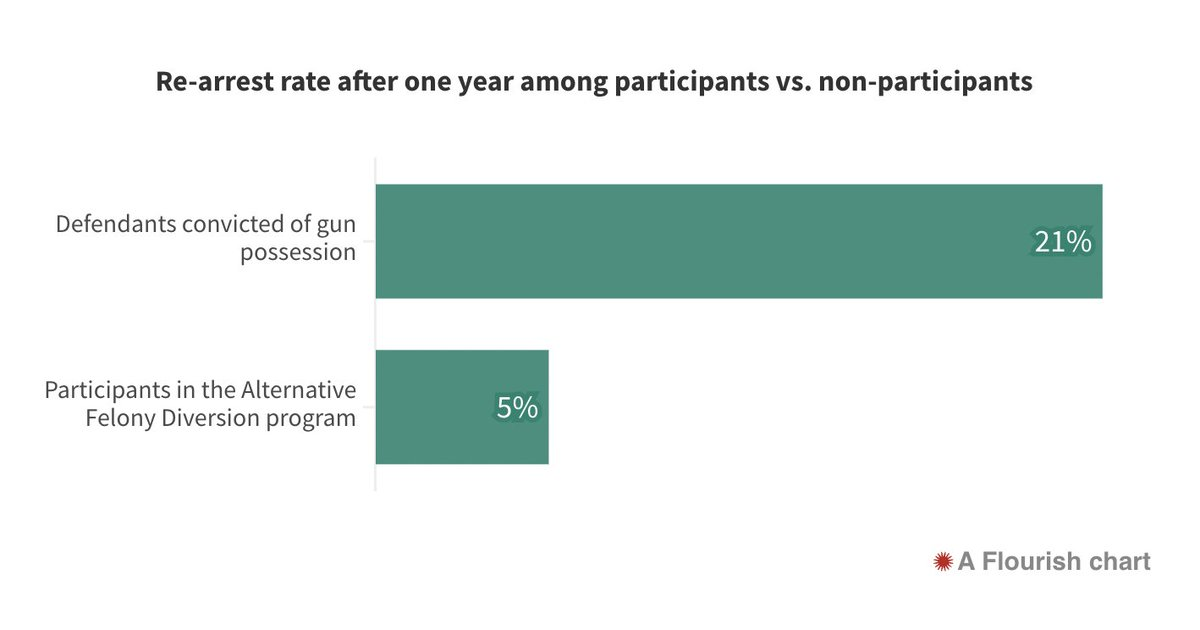
The rearrest rate of people involved in Alternative Felony Diversion for illegal firearm possession, as opposed to those not involved in the program, 2024.

In his first week in office, Krasner fired 31 prosecutors from the District Attorney's Office, including both junior and career supervisory staff. Those fired represented nearly a 10% reduction in the number of Philadelphia assistant district attorneys.

In February 2018, Krasner announced that law enforcement would no longer pursue criminal charges against those caught with marijuana possession. That same month, Krasner instructed prosecutors to stop seeking cash bail for those accused of some misdemeanors and nonviolent felonies. Krasner said that it was unfair to keep people in detention simply because they could not afford bail.

Krasner also announced that the DA's office had filed a lawsuit against a number of pharmaceutical companies for their role in the city's opioid epidemic. Krasner instructed prosecutors to stop charging sex workers who had fewer than three convictions.

In March 2018, it was reported that Krasner's staffers were working on creating a sentence review unit to review past cases and sentences and to seek resentencing in instances where individuals were given unduly harsh punishments. That same month, Krasner instructed prosecutors to reduce sentence lengths to defendants making pleas, refuse to bring certain low-level charges, and publicly explain their reasoning for pursuing expensive incarcerations to taxpayers footing the bills. He said,

"Fiscal responsibility is a justice issue, and it is an urgent justice issue. A dollar spent on incarceration should be worth it. Otherwise, that dollar may be better spent on addiction treatment, on public education, on policing and on other types of activity that make us all safer."

In 2018, some judges rejected the reduced sentences which Krasner's prosecutors had sought for juveniles who had previously been sentenced to life in prison.

In June 2018, Krasner called for the compiling of a comprehensive list of police officers who had lied while on duty, used excessive force, racially profiled, or violated civil rights, an unprecedented move to spotlight dishonest police officers and check their future courtroom testimony.

In 2019, Krasner filed a motion in the Supreme Court of Pennsylvania to declare capital punishment in Pennsylvania unconstitutional. He claimed the death penalty was illegal in the state because of the ban on cruel and unusual punishment in the Pennsylvania Constitution, citing the high turnover rates of convictions by appeals, the racially biased number of sentences given to black and Hispanic defendants, and the large number of convictions overturned due to ineffective counsel.

Krasner's progressive policies have caused Republicans in the Pennsylvania General Assembly to take steps to divert Krasner's authority to prosecute crime in Philadelphia to other officials. In 2019, the legislature passed a bill that established concurrent-jurisdiction between the District Attorney's Office and the Pennsylvania Attorney General to prosecute gun crimes in Philadelphia.

Following the fatal shooting of Philadelphia police officer James O'Connor IV, Krasner faced criticism from William McSwain, a federal prosecutor appointed by Donald Trump. McSwain, U.S. Attorney for the Eastern District of Pennsylvania, blamed the shooting on a prosecutorial discretion decision by Krasner's office to drop drug charges against suspected killer Hassan Elliott. While on probation for a gun possession charge, Elliott was arrested again on January 29, 2019, for cocaine possession and was released on his own recognizance. Nearly a week later on February 6, Elliott took part in the fatal shooting of Tyrone Tyree. Krasner's office dropped drug charges after Elliott failed to appear in court, choosing to approve an arrest warrant for Tyree's murder instead.

On March 13, as part of a SWAT unit carrying out an arrest warrant, O'Connor was fatally shot and Elliott was charged. Prosecutor spokeswoman Jane Roh responded to criticism by stating that the office believed murder to be a more serious crime than drug possession and charged Elliott accordingly. On the night of O'Connor's death, Philadelphia police officers formed a human chain at Temple University Hospital entrance to prevent Krasner from entering.

In July 2020, Krasner's office charged Philadelphia SWAT officer Richard P. Nicoletti with simple assault, reckless endangerment, official oppression, and possession of an instrument of crime. Video footage taken during the George Floyd protests showed that Nicoletti pepper sprayed three kneeling protesters. He pulled down the mask of one woman before spraying her in the face, sprayed another woman at point blank range, and sprayed a man numerous times in the face while he lay on the ground.

In September 2021, Krasner started an Alternative Felony Diversion program for people charged with illegal possession of firearms. In 2024 it was reported that the program was associated with a 76 percent reduction in re-arrests.

Krasner was featured in the 2021 documentary series Philly D.A. which won a prestigious Peabody Award in June 2022 for "crafting a thrilling series that's both broad and intimate about a man and a movement, capturing what happens when incrementalists meet their match in Big Idea thinkers who want to be doers."

As of April 2022, Krasner's Conviction Integrity Unit had exonerated 25 people convicted under previous DAs.

In 2023, the legislature established a separate office, SEPTA, to prosecute crimes committed on Philadelphia's public transit system.

In October 2024, Krasner filed a lawsuit against Elon Musk's America PAC, alleging that a $1 million giveaway promoted by the PAC constituted an illegal lottery. The PAC offered daily cash prizes to registered voters in swing states who sign a petition supporting the First and Second Amendments.

He is a founding member of the Project for the Fight Against Federal Overreach with eight other prosecutors. The coalition aims to assist in prosecuting federal law enforcement officers who violate state laws.

Krasner garnered significant controversy in the aftermath of the kidnapping and murder of Kada Scott in October 2025. Keon King, the suspect in Scott's murder, had previously been arrested in January 2025 for allegedly kidnapping and assaulting an ex-girlfriend, but was subsequently released after charges were dropped by Krasner's office. Pat Dugan, Krasner's opponent in the 2025 election, accused Krasner of being a "co-conspirator" to Scott's murder. Krasner later apologized for his office's handling of the case.

In January 2026, Krasner joined a nationwide coalition of prosecutors working to identify and prosecute Immigration and Customs Enforcement (ICE) agents who committed criminal acts, saying, "If we have to hunt you down the way they hunted down Nazis for decades, we will find your identities. We will find you. We will achieve justice."

In June, Krasner's office was rebuked by the Pennsylvania Supreme Court after several prosecutors seeking to overturn murder convictions repeatedly lied to and misled judges. The court's ruling also mandated the Pennsylvania Attorney General review future conviction annulments. A month later, a former prosecutor with Krasner's office testified in federal court that her supervisor "colluded" with defense lawyers and did not review evidence when seeking to overturn a murder conviction. In September, Judge Paul S. Diamond referred Krasner and one of his assistant district attorneys to the U.S. Department of Justice for investigation of alleged acts of perjury and obstruction of justice after DA staffers were allegedly pressured into lying.

==== 2022 impeachment ====
In June 2022, the Pennsylvania House of Representatives voted to form the Select Committee on Restoring Law and Order. The vote was 114 in favor and 86 opposed, and was largely along party lines (with all but one Republican voting in favor, and all but four Democrats voting against). The committee was tasked with investigating possible grounds for impeachment for what they called Krasner's "dereliction of duty" in handling Philadelphia's gun violence crisis. In August 2022, Krasner was subpoenaed by the committee but said that his office would not comply with the subpoena which he claimed was "wholly illegitimate" and politically motivated.

He subsequently filed a petition with the Commonwealth Court of Pennsylvania to halt the select committee's impeachment probe. In September, the Pennsylvania House voted to find Krasner in contempt for defying the committee's subpoena for documents related to his prosecutorial policies. Following the contempt vote, Krasner partially complied with the subpoena and provided the committee with "a number of documents", however some of the documents provided were already publicly available online, according to The Philadelphia Inquirer. On October 6, Krasner filed an additional petition with the Commonwealth Court to invalidate the subpoena.

On October 26, articles of impeachment were filed against Krasner charging him with "misbehavior in office" and attempting to obstruct the select committee's investigation into him. The House Judiciary Committee approved the articles of impeachment in a party-line vote on November 15. The next day, Krasner was impeached by the State House in a 107-85 vote; one Republican and all Democratic members of the House voted against a total of seven articles of impeachment. He was the first person to be impeached by the Pennsylvania House of Representatives since state Supreme Court Justice Rolf Larsen in 1994.

On December 30, 2022, Judge Ellen Ceisler of the Pennsylvania Commonwealth Court issued a court order saying that Krasner's official actions in office did not meet the requirements by the state's constitution for impeachment. Following the court order, the Pennsylvania State Senate voted on January 11, 2023, to indefinitely postpone the impeachment trial which was originally scheduled for January 18. A day after the vote to indefinitely postpone, the full Commonwealth Court issued a split decision in which the majority of justices agreed with Ceisler's December 30 court order.

On September 26, 2024, the Supreme Court of Pennsylvania ruled that the articles of impeachment against Krasner had expired when the 2021–2022 legislative session expired.

== Memoir ==
Penguin Random House published Krasner's memoir, For the People: A Story of Justice and Power, in 2021.

== Personal life ==
Krasner is married to Lisa M. Rau, a retired judge of the Philadelphia Court of Common Pleas. Krasner and Rau have two sons, Nate and Caleb.

Krasner has a 40 percent partnership stake in Tiger Building LP, which owns the Princeton Club building among other Philadelphia properties.

== Electoral history ==
Philadelphia District Attorney Democratic primary election, 2017
Party	Candidate	Votes	%
Democratic	Larry Krasner	59,368	38.24
Democratic	Joe Khan	31,480	20.28
Democratic	Rich Negrin	22,048	14.20
Democratic	Tariq Karim El-Shabazz	18,040	11.62
Democratic	Michael W. Untermeyer	12,709	8.19
Democratic	John O'Neill	9,246	5.96
Democratic	Teresa Carr Deni	2,335	1.50
Write-in		20	0.01
Total votes		155,246	100.00

Philadelphia District Attorney general election, 2017
Party	Candidate	Votes	%
Democratic	Larry Krasner	150,330	74.70
Republican	Beth Grossman	50,858	25.27
Write-in		58	0.03
Total votes		198,905	100.00
Democratic hold			

Philadelphia District Attorney Democratic primary election, 2021
Party	Candidate	Votes	%
Democratic	Larry Krasner (incumbent)	128,958	66.79
Democratic	Carlos Vega	63,953	33.12
Write-in		170	0.09
Total votes		193,081	100.00

Philadelphia District Attorney general election, 2021
Party	Candidate	Votes	%
Democratic	Larry Krasner (incumbent)	155,102	71.81
Republican	Chuck Peruto	60,304	27.92
Write-in		570	0.26
Total votes		215,976	100.00

2025 Philadelphia District Attorney Democratic primary results
Party	Candidate	Votes	%
Democratic	Larry Krasner (incumbent)	97,636	64.36%
Democratic	Patrick Dugan	53,849	35.50%
Write-in		211	0.14%
Total votes		151,696	100.00%

2025 Philadelphia District Attorney election
Party	Candidate	Votes	%
Democratic	Larry Krasner (incumbent)	276,126	76.10%
Republican	Patrick Dugan	86,305	23.78%
Write-in		432	0.12%
Total votes		362,836	100.00%

Historical election results can be found on the Philadelphia City Commissioners web site under Past Election Results.

== See also ==
- Tiffany Cabán
- Rachael Rollins
