= 1996 Pennsylvania House of Representatives election =

- November 5, 1996

All 203 seats in the Pennsylvania House of Representatives 102 seats needed for a majority

	Majority party	Minority party
Leader	Matthew J. Ryan	Bill DeWeese
Party	Republican	Democratic
Leader since	January 3, 1995	January 3, 1995
Leader's seat	168th	50th
Last election	101	102
Seats before	102	101
Seats after	104	99
Seat change	▲2	▼2
Popular vote	2,004,800	2,032,615
Percentage	49.32%	50.00%
Swing	▼3.07%	▲3.76%
- Democratic hold Democratic gain Republican hold Republican gain Republican: 50–60% 60–70% 70–80% 80–90% >90% Democratic: 50–60% 60–70% 70–80% 80–90% >90%
Speaker before election
Matthew J. Ryan
Republican
Elected Speaker
Matthew J. Ryan
Republican

The 1996 elections for the Pennsylvania House of Representatives were held on November 5, 1996, with all districts being decided. Primary elections were held on April 23, 1996. The term of office for those elected in 1996 began when the House of Representatives convened in January 1997. Pennsylvania State Representatives are elected for two-year terms, with all 203 seats up for election every two years.

Despite winning 102 seats in 1994, the Democrats didn't control the chamber, as Democratic State Representative Tom Stish switched affiliation to the Republican Party, giving Republicans control.

== Results summary ==
=== Retiring incumbents ===
==== Democrats ====
1. District 42: Gregory Fajt retired to run for State Senate.
2. District 44: Ronald Gamble retired.
3. District 56: Allen Kukovich retired to run for State Senate.
4. District 63: David R. Wright retired.
5. District 71: John N. Wozniak retired to run for State Senate.
6. District 171: Ruth Rudy retired.

==== Republicans ====
1. District 5: James R. Merry retired.
2. District 17: David Orr King retired.
3. District 28: Elaine Farmer retired.
4. District 138: Robert Nyce retired to run for Auditor General.
5. District 158: Joe Pitts retired to run for Congress.
6. District 160: Kathrynann Durham retired.

=== Incumbents defeated in primary ===
==== Republicans ====
1. District 104: Jeff Haste lost renomination to Mark S. McNaughton.

== Primary elections ==
=== Democratic primary ===
1996 Pennsylvania House of Representatives elections Democratic primary
District	Candidates	Votes	Percent
1	Linda Bebko-Jones	4,631	100.00
2	Italo Cappabianca	3,734	67.11
2	Ann Skapura DiMarco	1,830	32.89
3	No candidate filed for party.		
4	Tom Scrimenti	3,060	100.00
5	Bill Knupp	2,989	100.00
6	Ray Kuzmich	1,919	100.00
7	Michael Gruitza	3,255	76.27
7	Mike Pearce	1,013	23.73
8	James C. Coulter	2,189	100.00
9	Chris Sainato	6,258	71.63
9	Angelo A. Papa Jr.	2,479	28.37
10	Frank LaGrotta	4,399	100.00
11	Guy Travaglio	3,681	77.66
11	Roman J. Deutsch	1,059	22.34
12	No candidate filed for party.		
13	Jeff Bullock	1,095	100.00
14	Mike Veon	4,337	100.00
15	Nick Colafella	5,211	100.00
16	Susan Laughlin	5,232	100.00
17	Kenneth R. Ammann	2,026	73.49
17	Jon Stacey Servidio	731	26.51
18	David M. Zane	1,035	100.00
19	William Russell Robinson	4,757	100.00
20	Don Walko	6,157	100.00
21	Frank Pistella	6,150	100.00
22	Frank Gigliotti	5,838	58.38
22	Michael Diven	4,162	41.62
23	Ivan Itkin	6,489	100.00
24	Joseph Preston Jr.	4,760	67.01
24	Calvin Clinton Sr.	2,343	32.99
25	Joseph Markosek	4,518	100.00
26	Wilson T. Lambert Jr.	1,065	100.00
27	Thomas C. Petrone	6,279	100.00
28	Michael C. Smith	2,720	100.00
29	David Mayernik	5,297	100.00
30	Tom Sunday	4,402	100.00
31	Joseph E. Hunter	1,011	100.00
32	Anthony M. DeLuca	5,243	100.00
33	Frank Dermody	4,739	100.00
34	Ronald Cowell	4,531	68.22
34	Thomas Patrick Caulfield	2,111	31.78
35	Thomas Michlovic	5,815	100.00
36	Harry Readshaw	6,688	100.00
37	Jonathan L. Price	645	100.00
38	Richard Olasz	4,818	48.05
38	Kenneth W. Ruffing	2,432	24.25
38	C. L. Jabbour	2,091	20.85
38	Patrick Kincaid	687	6.85
39	David Levdansky	6,710	64.47
39	Gary J. Matta	3,698	35.53
40	Thomas Kovach	2,629	100.00
41	Ralph Kaiser	5,787	100.00
42	Coleen Vuono	3,055	50.62
42	William P. Smith	1,634	27.08
42	Timothy J. Nieman	1,346	22.30
43	No candidate filed for party.		
44	Andrew McGraw	2,813	36.43
44	Sharon Chauvet Braun	1,978	25.62
44	Michael A. Iagnemma	954	12.35
44	Raymond Chappell	656	8.50
44	Mary Lou Petronsky	548	7.10
44	Kevin P. Biber	398	5.15
44	Susan A. Josey	375	4.86
45	Fred Trello	6,667	100.00
46	Victor Lescovitz	4,684	100.00
47	Leo Trich	3,717	100.00
48	Anthony Colaizzo	5,816	100.00
49	Peter Daley	6,489	67.85
49	Alan Benyak	3,075	32.15
50	Bill DeWeese	5,891	100.00
51	Lawrence Roberts	4,005	100.00
52	James Shaner	4,571	59.46
52	Eugene G. Saloom	2,013	26.18
52	Michael J. Cavanagh	1,104	14.36
53	Robert N. Rosenberger	661	100.00
54	Terry Van Horne	4,801	53.93
54	Gary Alexander	4,101	46.07
55	Joseph Petrarca Jr.	4,555	100.00
56	James Casorio	2,799	30.00
56	Becky Brammell	1,668	17.88
56	Janice C. Smarto	1,281	13.73
56	James F. Solomon	1,123	12.04
56	Joe Ebbitt	751	8.05
56	Sallie Wolfgang Bradley	595	6.38
56	Dante J. Bertani	575	6.16
56	Shirley Darby	539	5.78
57	Thomas Tangretti	4,941	100.00
58	Herman Mihalich	5,981	100.00
59	No candidate filed for party.		
60	Timothy Pesci	4,186	100.00
61	No candidate filed for party.		
62	Sara Steelman	3,673	100.00
63	Shirley C. Hager	2,026	47.03
63	Gerald J. Borovick	1,418	32.92
63	Ralph D. Seigworth	864	20.06
64	No candidate filed for party.		
65	Sheila Brooker	2,469	100.00
66	Peter P. Pape	1,602	41.22
66	Tom Swab	1,315	33.84
66	William D. Hrinya	969	24.94
67	No candidate filed for party.		
68	No candidate filed for party.		
69	William R. Lloyd Jr.	3,359	84.78
69	Kenneth Warnick	603	15.22
70	Michael P. Clarke	587	100.00
71	Edward P. Wojnaroski	3,721	49.06
71	David John Bako	1,864	24.57
71	Rick T. Farra	929	12.25
71	Bernie A. Oravec	542	7.15
71	Frank Rodney Grata	529	6.97
72	Thomas F. Yewcic	7,315	100.00
73	Gary Haluska	8,204	100.00
74	Bud George	4,620	100.00
75	Dan A. Surra	4,960	100.00
76	Mike Hanna	2,796	100.00
77	Scott Conklin	1,821	100.00
78	John H. Fair	2,116	100.00
79	No candidate filed for party.		
80	John P. Harker	1,621	100.00
81	No candidate filed for party.		
82	Damien F. Henry	1,520	100.00
83	No candidate filed for party.		
84	No candidate filed for party.		
85	No candidate filed for party.		
86	Phil Drumheiser	1,306	100.00
87	No candidate filed for party.		
88	Julius Uehlein	1,840	100.00
89	Jeffrey Coy	1,516	100.00
90	No candidate filed for party.		
91	Larry B. Feeser Jr.	1,700	100.00
92	Frank Fortino	1,350	100.00
93	Joseph Joe Sacco	1,577	100.00
94	Sterling L. Fritz	1,360	100.00
95	Stephen Stetler	1,994	100.00
96	Mike Sturla	1,192	100.00
97	Erik Brown	1,034	100.00
98	George Leyh	974	100.00
99	Donald R. Axon	548	100.00
100	John F. Haser Jr.	526	100.00
101	Paul A. Heise	1,000	100.00
102	No candidate filed for party.		
103	Ron Buxton	1,655	51.21
103	James H. Porter III	1,149	35.55
103	Stephen M. Thompson	428	13.24
104	Diane Bowman	2,109	100.00
105	Jack C. Garner	1,754	100.00
106	Mike Pries	1,501	100.00
107	Robert Belfanti	4,109	100.00
108	No candidate filed for party.		
109	John Gordner	3,176	100.00
110	No candidate filed for party.		
111	No candidate filed for party.		
112	Fred Belardi	3,669	100.00
113	Gaynor Cawley	4,310	100.00
114	No candidate filed for party.		
115	Edward Staback	5,064	100.00
116	Todd Eachus	1,887	54.51
116	Gil Degenhart	1,575	45.49
117	No candidate filed for party.		
118	Thomas Tigue	3,984	100.00
119	Stanley Jarolin	4,908	53.82
119	John Yudichak	4,212	46.18
120	Phyllis Mundy	2,557	100.00
121	Kevin Blaum	3,152	100.00
122	Keith R. McCall	3,536	67.53
122	Ted J. Yackera Jr.	1,700	32.47
123	Edward Lucyk	4,267	100.00
124	Dennis Baylor	1,712	100.00
125	Karl Zeller	2,012	100.00
126	Dante Santoni	2,907	100.00
127	Thomas Caltagirone	1,871	100.00
128	Jonathan F. Meter	1,892	100.00
129	Cathleen Palm	1,639	100.00
130	Kevin G. Poole	1,302	100.00
131	Kurt J. Derr	1,932	69.87
131	Peter J. Antonsen	833	30.13
132	Daniel K. McCarthy	1,937	100.00
133	T. J. Rooney	2,767	72.80
133	William Guillermo Lopez Jr.	1,034	27.20
134	No candidate filed for party.		
135	Lisa Boscola	3,513	100.00
136	Joseph Corpora	2,358	70.28
136	Rusandra Sandy DePaul	584	17.41
136	Carol Weaver	413	12.31
137	Ritchey J. Ricci	2,201	100.00
138	Marilyn Lieberman	1,559	63.63
138	Ira J. Faro	891	36.37
139	No candidate filed for party.		
140	Thomas C. Corrigan	2,248	100.00
141	Anthony Melio	2,351	100.00
142	Robert C. Sooby	1,403	100.00
143	Melissa V. Bond	1,427	100.00
144	No candidate filed for party.		
145	Suzanne Hendricks	1,000	100.00
146	Bill Fontaine	729	100.00
147	No candidate filed for party.		
148	Joseph McCaffrey	1,460	100.00
149	Connie Williams	1,626	77.76
149	Angelo C. Faragalli	465	22.24
150	No candidate filed for party.		
151	F. Lydell Clark	871	100.00
152	Elinda Fishman Kiss	794	100.00
153	Alex Katz	1,226	100.00
154	Lawrence Curry	3,625	100.00
155	No candidate filed for party.		
156	No candidate filed for party.		
157	Linda Else Leighbody	1,019	100.00
158	No candidate filed for party.		
159	Thaddeus Kirkland	931	100.00
160	Ben Lopchinsky	777	62.66
160	Harry L. Seth	463	37.34
161	Nick Anastasio	1,398	100.00
162	Dorothy Gallagher	1,113	100.00
163	Ron Morin	1,274	100.00
164	Carol A. Purfield	1,133	100.00
165	Joan Coper	1,448	100.00
166	Greg Vitali	2,419	100.00
167	No candidate filed for party.		
168	Wilma Hutcheson-Williams	1,225	100.00
169	Michael McGuigan	1,312	100.00
170	Michael J. Rowley	1,496	100.00
171	Keith Bierly	2,598	100.00
172	Michelle McMenamin	2,828	100.00
173	Michael McGeehan	3,209	100.00
174	Alan Butkovitz	4,229	100.00
175	Marie Lederer	3,116	100.00
176	No candidate filed for party.		
177	Anthony W. Farnon Jr.	1,096	50.86
177	James Flanagan	1,059	49.14
178	No candidate filed for party.		
179	William Rieger	2,736	100.00
180	Benjamin Ramos	3,174	66.96
180	Sandy C. Acosta	1,400	29.54
180	Mike Bunk	166	3.50
181	Curtis Thomas	5,301	100.00
182	Babette Josephs	4,940	100.00
183	Frank W. Yandrisevits	2,122	49.01
183	Robert G. Klock	1,847	42.66
183	Martin W. Sabo	361	8.34
184	William F. Keller	3,932	100.00
185	Ronald Donatucci	3,456	79.72
185	Nicholas Picuri	879	20.28
186	Harold James	5,305	100.00
187	Arlene Dabrow	1,143	59.87
187	Brian P. Husowitz	766	40.13
188	James R. Roebuck Jr.	3,624	53.33
188	Rufus Lynch	2,215	32.60
188	Curtis Clark	956	14.07
189	Joseph Battisto	1,609	100.00
190	Michael Horsey	4,413	61.42
190	Al Spivey Jr.	2,772	38.58
191	Anthony H. Williams	4,463	100.00
192	Louise Bishop	6,481	100.00
193	Carol A. Minnich	1,470	100.00
194	Kathy Manderino	3,756	100.00
195	Frank L. Oliver	4,807	100.00
196	Barbara J. Spangler	2,232	100.00
197	Andrew Carn	6,645	100.00
198	Rosita Youngblood	5,521	100.00
199	Bill Sloane	1,492	100.00
200	LeAnna Washington	5,979	100.00
201	John L. Myers	5,644	100.00
202	Mark B. Cohen	4,450	100.00
203	Dwight Evans	5,882	100.00

=== Republican primary ===
1996 Pennsylvania House of Representatives elections Republican primary
District	Candidates	Votes	Percent
1	No candidate filed for party.		
2	Brad Roae	1,667	100.00
3	Karl Boyes	4,154	100.00
4	No candidate filed for party.		
5	R. Tracy Seyfert	2,113	36.75
5	Clifford Kip Allen	1,798	31.27
5	Carol Bocan	1,157	20.12
5	Clayton Schulze	682	11.86
6	Teresa Forcier	4,263	100.00
7	No candidate filed for party.		
8	Howard Fargo	4,140	100.00
9	No candidate filed for party.		
10	No candidate filed for party.		
11	Cindy McKnight	2,588	50.63
11	Larry A. Thompson	2,524	49.37
12	Patricia Carone	4,865	100.00
13	Arthur D. Hershey	4,648	100.00
14	Matthew Heidorn	1,315	47.91
14	Charlie Camp	734	26.74
14	Debbie Lambert	696	25.36
15	Robert J. Morgan	2,487	100.00
16	No candidate filed for party.		
17	Rod Wilt	2,207	38.30
17	Brian Shipley	2,137	37.09
17	David Stone	1,213	21.05
17	Richard J. Turner	205	3.56
18	Gene DiGirolamo	2,971	100.00
19	No candidate filed for party.		
20	No candidate filed for party.		
21	Joseph J. Galda Jr.	1,102	100.00
22	John A. Mazzie	935	100.00
23	No candidate filed for party.		
24	No candidate filed for party.		
25	No candidate filed for party.		
26	Tim Hennessey	3,558	100.00
27	Robert A. Benson	1,614	100.00
28	Elaine Farmer	4,649	100.00
29	David A. Alberti	3,020	100.00
30	Jeff Habay	4,340	81.23
30	Dan Anderson	1,003	18.77
31	David J. Steil	3,011	100.00
32	John J. Czolba	2,125	100.00
33	Pat Dolan	2,243	100.00
34	No candidate filed for party.		
35	No candidate filed for party.		
36	No candidate filed for party.		
37	Katie True	5,464	100.00
38	Joseph C. Cenname	1,035	100.00
39	David E. Singleton	1,964	100.00
40	Albert Pettit	4,699	100.00
41	No candidate filed for party.		
42	Thomas L. Stevenson	2,175	39.65
42	Herb Ohliger	1,335	24.33
42	Ernest L. Fullerton	771	14.05
42	Mike Suley	646	11.78
42	W. Flagg Pavlik	559	10.19
43	Jere Schuler	4,451	100.00
44	John R. Pippy	1,879	100.00
45	Jack Youngblood	1,383	100.00
46	No candidate filed for party.		
47	William Haynes	1,795	100.00
48	No candidate filed for party.		
49	No candidate filed for party.		
50	Lynda C. Bush	1,326	100.00
51	No candidate filed for party.		
52	Richard D. Brown	1,408	100.00
53	Robert Godshall	2,448	100.00
54	No candidate filed for party.		
55	Robert H. Long	1,878	100.00
56	Lawrence M. Wojcik Jr.	1,415	37.98
56	John R. McKenzie	830	22.28
56	Lee Morgan	576	15.46
56	Paul H. Diegelman	538	14.44
56	Robert Palchak	367	9.85
57	Joseph R. Kostelnik	2,161	100.00
58	No candidate filed for party.		
59	Jess M. Stairs	3,486	100.00
60	Paul Wass	2,362	100.00
61	Joseph Gladeck	3,094	59.43
61	Michael Getzfread	2,112	40.57
62	Rich Gallo	2,936	73.90
62	Charles Chuck Sickles	1,037	26.10
63	Fred McIlhattan	2,765	45.65
63	Greg Mortimer	2,282	37.68
63	Sal Mazzocchi	1,010	16.67
64	Scott Hutchinson	5,959	100.00
65	Jim Lynch	5,385	100.00
66	Samuel H. Smith	4,806	71.17
66	George C. White	1,947	28.83
67	Kenneth Jadlowiec	5,500	100.00
68	Matt E. Baker	6,579	100.00
69	Bob Bastian	4,863	100.00
70	John Fichter	2,305	100.00
71	Herbert Pfuhl Jr.	2,623	62.32
71	Michael W. Knee	1,586	37.68
72	Frank Alt	3,317	100.00
73	Dennis Bailey	2,043	100.00
74	No candidate filed for party.		
75	Victor C. Straub	4,553	100.00
76	Jim Rogers	3,212	100.00
77	Lynn Herman	3,948	100.00
78	Dick Hess	4,126	100.00
79	Richard Geist	3,127	100.00
80	Jerry Stern	4,415	100.00
81	Larry Sather	4,266	100.00
82	Daniel F. Clark	3,690	100.00
83	Thomas W. Dempsey	2,706	100.00
84	Brett Feese	3,397	100.00
85	Russ Fairchild	4,615	100.00
86	Allan Egolf	4,018	100.00
87	Pat Vance	4,977	100.00
88	Jerry L. Nailor	6,102	100.00
89	Timothy B. Bittle	2,802	100.00
90	Patrick Fleagle	2,504	100.00
91	Stephen Maitland	3,922	100.00
92	Bruce I. Smith	3,318	60.78
92	Michael J. Wilson	2,141	39.22
93	Mike Waugh	3,988	100.00
94	Stan Saylor	3,857	100.00
95	Mark L. Althouse	1,451	63.47
95	Janis Rozelle	835	36.53
96	C. Ted Darcus	1,831	100.00
97	Jere Strittmatter	6,366	100.00
98	Thomas E. Armstrong	3,793	68.50
98	Richard K. Seifried Jr.	1,129	20.39
98	Bruce R. Gadbois	615	11.11
99	Leroy M. Zimmerman	4,402	100.00
100	John E. Barley	4,144	100.00
101	Edward H. Krebs	3,573	100.00
102	Peter Zug	3,468	100.00
103	No candidate filed for party.		
104	Mark S. McNaughton	4,229	54.25
104	Jeff Haste	3,566	45.75
105	Ron Marsico	4,656	100.00
106	Frank Tulli	4,196	100.00
107	Chris Pfaff	1,555	100.00
108	Merle Phillips	3,374	100.00
109	No candidate filed for party.		
110	J. Scot Chadwick	4,433	100.00
111	Sandra Major	5,538	100.00
112	Don Alward	814	100.00
113	No candidate filed for party.		
114	Frank Serafini	2,634	100.00
115	No candidate filed for party.		
116	Tom Stish	2,232	100.00
117	George Hasay	2,617	100.00
118	No candidate filed for party.		
119	No candidate filed for party.		
120	William Bill James	1,407	40.85
120	David N. Fiorini	1,094	31.77
120	Michael Matosky	943	27.38
121	No candidate filed for party.		
122	Todd D. Koller	1,969	100.00
123	No candidate filed for party.		
124	Dave Argall	4,094	100.00
125	Bob Allen	3,970	100.00
126	Kathleen A. Wolfe	1,016	41.12
126	John A. Ulrich	716	28.98
126	John Fielding	664	26.87
126	Westley E. Archambault	75	3.04
127	Robin Costenbader-Jacobson	493	56.80
127	Ann B. Chapin	375	43.20
128	Sam Rohrer	3,361	67.72
128	Jim Gallen Jr.	1,602	32.28
129	Sheila Miller	3,046	100.00
130	Dennis Leh	1,931	100.00
131	Pat Browne	1,461	100.00
132	Charlie Dent	2,671	100.00
133	Andy Roman	1,481	73.98
133	Glenn Eckhart	521	26.02
134	Donald Snyder	3,140	100.00
135	Manus P. Maclean	1,575	100.00
136	Brian E. Ahearn	1,087	100.00
137	Leonard Gruppo	2,322	100.00
138	Craig Dally	1,816	100.00
139	Jerry Birmelin	3,853	100.00
140	Jenna A. Kostaras	943	100.00
141	Richard J. Gosin Sr.	1,068	100.00
142	Matthew N. Wright	3,431	100.00
143	Joe Conti	4,398	100.00
144	Thomas W. Druce	3,111	100.00
145	Paul Clymer	2,982	100.00
146	Robert Reber	1,908	100.00
147	Raymond Bunt	2,794	100.00
148	Lita Indzel Cohen	2,840	100.00
149	Colleen Sheehan	3,408	63.94
149	Terry Spahr	1,922	36.06
150	John A. Lawless	3,402	100.00
151	Eugene McGill	2,927	100.00
152	Roy Cornell	3,510	100.00
153	Ellen Bard	3,069	100.00
154	Lisa Friebel	2,347	100.00
155	Curt Schroder	4,140	100.00
156	Elinor Z. Taylor	5,307	100.00
157	Carole A. Rubley	3,529	100.00
158	L. Chris Ross	5,898	100.00
159	Hampton Evans	1,932	100.00
160	Stephen Barrar	4,970	55.03
160	Joe McGinn	4,061	44.97
161	Tom Gannon	5,878	100.00
162	Ronald C. Raymond	5,205	100.00
163	Nicholas Micozzie	4,989	100.00
164	Mario Civera	5,124	100.00
165	Bill Adolph	6,540	100.00
166	Steve Stinson	4,311	69.58
166	Joseph R. Breslin	1,885	30.42
167	Bob Flick	5,270	100.00
168	Matthew J. Ryan	6,199	100.00
169	Dennis M. O'Brien	2,317	100.00
170	George T. Kenney	2,000	100.00
171	Kerry Benninghoff	5,223	100.00
172	John Perzel	2,242	100.00
173	Dennis P. Fink	800	100.00
174	Marie D. Cantwell	905	100.00
175	Anthony N. Radocaj	874	100.00
176	Christopher Wogan	2,427	100.00
177	John J. Taylor	1,557	100.00
178	Roy Reinard	2,680	78.43
178	Jay Russell	737	21.57
179	Jon Mirowitz	239	100.00
180	No candidate filed for party.		
181	Sam A. Sam	212	100.00
182	Thomas C. Baggio	833	100.00
183	Julie Harhart	1,822	100.00
184	Michael Mikstas	728	100.00
185	Edward J. Danzi	874	100.00
186	Wallace D. Delaney	318	100.00
187	Paul Semmel	2,313	60.71
187	Todd R. Gummo	1,497	39.29
188	Kelly Dutton	131	100.00
189	Art Rodriguez	1,658	100.00
190	Gus E. Lacy Jr.	183	100.00
191	Francis X. Hardy	489	100.00
192	No candidate filed for party.		
193	Steven R. Nickol	3,785	100.00
194	No candidate filed for party.		
195	David C. Thomsen	270	100.00
196	Todd Platts	4,346	100.00
197	Sundai Mtunda	115	100.00
198	Edwin H. Hopton Jr.	437	100.00
199	Albert Masland	4,045	100.00
200	Thomas J. Cullen	522	100.00
201	Joseph Louis Messa	132	100.00
202	Gail L. Abrams	479	100.00
203	John Paul Mugford	253	100.00

== General election ==
=== Overview ===
Statewide outlook
Affiliation	Candidates	Votes	Vote %	Seats won
Republican	171	2,004,800	49.32	104
Democratic	167	2,032,615	50.00	99
Libertarian	13	9,822	0.24	0
Reform	2	4,970	0.12	0
No Pay Increase	1	3,021	0.07	0
Write-in	0	2,780	0.07	0
Citizens Alliance	1	2,173	0.05	0
Constitution	1	1,308	0.03	0
James A. Fillhart	1	1,172	0.03	0
Do For Self	1	932	0.02	0
Laub State Rep	1	743	0.02	0
Independent	1	251	0.01	0
Natural Law	1	232	0.01	0
Lincoln	1	168	0.00	0
Socialist Workers	1	128	0.00	0
Total	363	4,065,115	100.00	203

=== Close races ===
Districts where the margin of victory was under 10%:

1. District 183, 0.9%
2. District 89, 1.7%
3. District 56, 1.8%
4. District 149, 2.4% (gain)
5. District 131, 4.3%
6. District 160, 4.5%
7. District 5, 4.8%
8. District 42, 4.8% (gain)
9. District 14, 4.9%
10. District 116, 6.3% (gain)
11. District 17, 6.9%
12. District 69, 7.3%

=== District breakdown ===
District	Party	Incumbent	Status	Party	Candidate	Votes	%
1	Democratic	Linda Bebko-Jones	Re-elected	Democratic	Linda Bebko-Jones	14,396	100.00
2	Democratic	Italo Cappabianca	Re-elected	Democratic	Italo Cappabianca	14,181	68.76
2	Democratic	Italo Cappabianca	Re-elected	Republican	Brad Roae	6,444	31.24
3	Republican	Karl Boyes	Re-elected	Republican	Karl Boyes	20,096	100.00
4	Democratic	Tom Scrimenti	Re-elected	Democratic	Tom Scrimenti	14,671	65.91
4	Democratic	Tom Scrimenti	Re-elected	Republican	Sandra Hughes	7,587	34.09
5	Republican	James R. Merry	Retired	Republican	R. Tracy Seyfert	11,601	52.38
5	Republican	James R. Merry	Retired	Democratic	Bill Knupp	10,547	47.62
6	Republican	Teresa Forcier	Re-elected	Republican	Teresa Forcier	12,898	65.26
6	Republican	Teresa Forcier	Re-elected	Democratic	Ray Kuzmich	6,867	34.74
7	Democratic	Michael Gruitza	Re-elected	Democratic	Michael Gruitza	16,216	100.00
8	Republican	Howard Fargo	Re-elected	Republican	Howard Fargo	13,494	70.04
8	Republican	Howard Fargo	Re-elected	Democratic	James C. Coulter	5,773	29.96
9	Democratic	Chris Sainato	Re-elected (Note: Cross-endorsed by the Republican Party.)	Democratic	Chris Sainato	20,430	100.00
10	Democratic	Frank LaGrotta	Re-elected	Democratic	Frank LaGrotta	20,328	100.00
11	Democratic	Guy Travaglio	Re-elected	Democratic	Guy Travaglio	13,179	59.72
11	Democratic	Guy Travaglio	Re-elected	Republican	Cindy McKnight	8,889	40.28
12	Republican	Patricia Carone	Re-elected	Republican	Patricia Carone	21,361	100.00
13	Republican	Arthur D. Hershey	Re-elected	Republican	Arthur D. Hershey	12,748	69.55
13	Republican	Arthur D. Hershey	Re-elected	Democratic	Jeff Bullock	5,581	30.45
14	Democratic	Mike Veon	Re-elected	Democratic	Mike Veon	10,768	52.48
14	Democratic	Mike Veon	Re-elected	Republican	Matthew Heidorn	9,752	47.52
15	Democratic	Nick Colafella	Re-elected	Democratic	Nick Colafella	17,194	64.83
15	Democratic	Nick Colafella	Re-elected	Republican	Robert J. Morgan	7,154	26.97
15	Democratic	Nick Colafella	Re-elected	Citizens Alliance	Gordon Johnston	2,173	8.19
16	Democratic	Susan Laughlin	Re-elected	Democratic	Susan Laughlin	17,865	100.00
17	Republican	David Orr King	Retired	Republican	Rod Wilt	11,000	53.47
17	Republican	David Orr King	Retired	Democratic	Kenneth R. Ammann	9,574	46.53
18	Republican	Gene DiGirolamo	Re-elected	Republican	Gene DiGirolamo	12,670	64.13
18	Republican	Gene DiGirolamo	Re-elected	Democratic	David M. Zane	6,630	33.56
18	Republican	Gene DiGirolamo	Re-elected	Libertarian	Charles A. Zatavekas	456	2.31
19	Democratic	William Russell Robinson	Re-elected	Democratic	William Russell Robinson	12,601	93.11
19	Democratic	William Russell Robinson	Re-elected	Do For Self	Mark A. Brentley Sr.	932	6.89
20	Democratic	Don Walko	Re-elected	Democratic	Don Walko	13,254	94.82
20	Democratic	Don Walko	Re-elected	Libertarian	Charles Stutler	724	5.18
21	Democratic	Frank Pistella	Re-elected	Democratic	Frank Pistella	14,273	74.98
21	Democratic	Frank Pistella	Re-elected	Republican	Joseph J. Galda Jr.	4,763	25.02
22	Democratic	Frank Gigliotti	Re-elected	Democratic	Frank Gigliotti	14,401	73.59
22	Democratic	Frank Gigliotti	Re-elected	Republican	John A. Mazzie	5,040	25.76
22	Democratic	Frank Gigliotti	Re-elected	Socialist Workers	Edwin Fruit	128	0.65
23	Democratic	Ivan Itkin	Re-elected	Democratic	Ivan Itkin	16,408	100.00
24	Democratic	Joseph Preston Jr.	Re-elected	Democratic	Joseph Preston Jr.	15,438	100.00
25	Democratic	Joseph Markosek	Re-elected	Democratic	Joseph Markosek	16,057	100.00
26	Republican	Tim Hennessey	Re-elected	Republican	Tim Hennessey	11,584	63.62
26	Republican	Tim Hennessey	Re-elected	Democratic	Wilson T. Lambert Jr.	6,625	36.38
27	Democratic	Thomas C. Petrone	Re-elected	Democratic	Thomas C. Petrone	14,996	73.68
27	Democratic	Thomas C. Petrone	Re-elected	Republican	Robert A. Benson	5,357	26.32
28	Republican	Elaine Farmer	Retired	Republican	Jane Orie	17,662	60.00
28	Republican	Elaine Farmer	Retired	Democratic	Michael C. Smith	9,187	31.21
28	Republican	Elaine Farmer	Retired	Reform	William J. Baierl	2,586	8.79
29	Democratic	David Mayernik	Re-elected	Democratic	David Mayernik	17,642	71.08
29	Democratic	David Mayernik	Re-elected	Republican	David A. Alberti	7,178	28.92
30	Republican	Jeff Habay	Re-elected	Republican	Jeff Habay	19,656	68.35
30	Republican	Jeff Habay	Re-elected	Democratic	Tom Sunday	9,102	31.65
31	Republican	David J. Steil	Re-elected	Republican	David J. Steil	18,955	62.07
31	Republican	David J. Steil	Re-elected	Democratic	Joseph E. Hunter	11,582	37.93
32	Democratic	Tony DeLuca	Re-elected	Democratic	Tony DeLuca	17,194	77.16
32	Democratic	Tony DeLuca	Re-elected	Republican	John J. Czolba	5,090	22.84
33	Democratic	Frank Dermody	Re-elected	Democratic	Frank Dermody	13,390	59.08
33	Democratic	Frank Dermody	Re-elected	Republican	Pat Dolan	9,276	40.92
34	Democratic	Ronald Cowell	Re-elected	Democratic	Ronald Cowell	14,970	83.21
34	Democratic	Ronald Cowell	Re-elected	No Pay Increase	Gary J. English	3,021	16.79
35	Democratic	Thomas Michlovic	Re-elected	Democratic	Thomas Michlovic	13,085	100.00
36	Democratic	Harry Readshaw	Re-elected	Democratic	Harry Readshaw	16,765	100.00
37	Republican	Katie True	Re-elected	Republican	Katie True	17,610	77.20
37	Republican	Katie True	Re-elected	Democratic	Jonathan L. Price	5,201	22.80
38	Democratic	Richard Olasz	Re-elected	Democratic	Richard Olasz	13,643	67.41
38	Democratic	Richard Olasz	Re-elected	Republican	Joseph C. Cenname	6,597	32.59
39	Democratic	David Levdansky	Re-elected	Democratic	David Levdansky	15,071	70.54
39	Democratic	David Levdansky	Re-elected	Republican	David E. Singleton	6,294	29.46
40	Republican	Albert Pettit	Re-elected	Republican	Albert Pettit	18,728	65.73
40	Republican	Albert Pettit	Re-elected	Democratic	Thomas Kovach	9,766	34.27
41	Democratic	Ralph Kaiser	Re-elected	Democratic	Ralph Kaiser	24,611	100.00
42	Democratic	Gregory Fajt	Retired to run for State Senate	Republican	Thomas L. Stevenson	14,908	52.40
42	Democratic	Gregory Fajt	Retired to run for State Senate	Democratic	Coleen Vuono	13,542	47.60
43	Republican	Jere Schuler	Re-elected	Republican	Jere Schuler	15,504	100.00
44	Democratic	Ronald Gamble	Retired	Republican	John Pippy	12,961	57.12
44	Democratic	Ronald Gamble	Retired	Democratic	Andrew J. McGraw	9,730	42.88
45	Democratic	Fred Trello	Re-elected	Democratic	Fred Trello	15,950	69.66
45	Democratic	Fred Trello	Re-elected	Republican	Jack Youngblood	6,947	30.34
46	Democratic	Victor Lescovitz	Re-elected	Democratic	Victor Lescovitz	17,481	100.00
47	Democratic	Leo Trich	Re-elected	Democratic	Leo Trich	12,339	67.18
47	Democratic	Leo Trich	Re-elected	Republican	William Haynes	6,027	32.82
48	Democratic	Anthony Colaizzo	Re-elected	Democratic	Anthony Colaizzo	18,018	100.00
49	Democratic	Peter Daley	Re-elected	Democratic	Peter Daley	16,860	100.00
50	Democratic	Bill DeWeese	Re-elected	Democratic	Bill DeWeese	13,965	67.67
50	Democratic	Bill DeWeese	Re-elected	Republican	Lynda C. Bush	6,673	32.33
51	Democratic	Lawrence Roberts	Re-elected	Democratic	Lawrence Roberts	11,981	100.00
52	Democratic	James Shaner	Re-elected	Democratic	James Shaner	11,972	68.18
52	Democratic	James Shaner	Re-elected	Republican	Richard D. Brown	5,587	31.82
53	Republican	Robert Godshall	Re-elected	Republican	Robert Godshall	14,621	73.09
53	Republican	Robert Godshall	Re-elected	Democratic	Robert N. Rosenberger	5,216	26.07
53	Republican	Robert Godshall	Re-elected	Lincoln	Gary L. Robinson	168	0.84
54	Democratic	Terry Van Horne	Re-elected	Democratic	Terry Van Horne	14,865	100.00
55	Democratic	Joseph Petrarca Jr.	Re-elected	Democratic	Joseph Petrarca Jr.	13,765	70.24
55	Democratic	Joseph Petrarca Jr.	Re-elected	Republican	Robert H. Long	5,831	29.76
56	Democratic	Allen Kukovich	Retired to run for State Senate	Democratic	James Casorio	11,866	50.91
56	Democratic	Allen Kukovich	Retired to run for State Senate	Republican	Lawrence M. Wojcik Jr.	11,444	49.09
57	Democratic	Thomas Tangretti	Re-elected	Democratic	Thomas Tangretti	13,427	64.23
57	Democratic	Thomas Tangretti	Re-elected	Republican	Joseph R. Kostelnik	7,479	35.77
58	Democratic	Herman Mihalich	Re-elected	Democratic	Herman Mihalich	15,148	100.00
59	Republican	Jess M. Stairs	Re-elected (Note: Cross-endorsed by the Democratic Party.)	Republican	Jess M. Stairs	21,707	100.00
60	Democratic	Timothy Pesci	Re-elected	Democratic	Timothy Pesci	14,043	66.88
60	Democratic	Timothy Pesci	Re-elected	Republican	Paul Wass	6,953	33.12
61	Republican	Joseph Gladeck	Re-elected	Republican	Joseph Gladeck	16,300	57.90
61	Republican	Joseph Gladeck	Re-elected	Democratic	Jo White	11,070	39.32
61	Republican	Joseph Gladeck	Re-elected	Libertarian	Sherry A. Rizzo	783	2.78
62	Democratic	Sara Steelman	Re-elected	Democratic	Sara Steelman	11,340	57.00
62	Democratic	Sara Steelman	Re-elected	Republican	Rich Gallo	8,555	43.00
63	Democratic	David R. Wright	Retired	Republican	Fred McIlhattan	12,790	60.73
63	Democratic	David R. Wright	Retired	Democratic	Shirley C. Hager	6,962	33.06
63	Democratic	David R. Wright	Retired	Constitution	Janet Serene	1,308	6.21
64	Republican	Scott Hutchinson	Re-elected	Republican	Scott Hutchinson	15,885	100.00
65	Republican	Jim Lynch	Re-elected	Republican	Jim Lynch	14,617	68.32
65	Republican	Jim Lynch	Re-elected	Democratic	Sheila Brooker	6,778	31.68
66	Republican	Samuel H. Smith	Re-elected	Republican	Samuel H. Smith	13,739	69.80
66	Republican	Samuel H. Smith	Re-elected	Democratic	Peter P. Pape	4,773	24.25
66	Republican	Samuel H. Smith	Re-elected	James A. Fillhart	James Allen Fillhart	1,172	5.95
67	Republican	Kenneth Jadlowiec	Re-elected	Republican	Kenneth Jadlowiec	15,755	100.00
68	Republican	Matt E. Baker	Re-elected	Republican	Matt E. Baker	19,555	100.00
69	Democratic	William R. Lloyd Jr.	Re-elected	Democratic	William R. Lloyd Jr.	12,475	53.63
69	Democratic	William R. Lloyd Jr.	Re-elected	Republican	Bob Bastian	10,786	46.37
70	Republican	John Fichter	Re-elected	Republican	John Fichter	10,097	56.44
70	Republican	John Fichter	Re-elected	Democratic	Michael P. Clarke	7,792	43.56
71	Democratic	John N. Wozniak	Retired to run for State Senate	Democratic	Edward P. Wojnaroski	12,248	57.65
71	Democratic	John N. Wozniak	Retired to run for State Senate	Republican	Herbert Pfuhl Jr.	8,997	42.35
72	Democratic	Thomas F. Yewcic	Re-elected	Democratic	Thomas F. Yewcic	17,623	76.37
72	Democratic	Thomas F. Yewcic	Re-elected	Republican	Frank Alt	5,453	23.63
73	Democratic	Gary Haluska	Re-elected	Democratic	Gary Haluska	16,107	78.88
73	Democratic	Gary Haluska	Re-elected	Republican	Dennis Bailey	4,312	21.12
74	Democratic	Bud George	Re-elected	Democratic	Bud George	20,256	100.00
75	Democratic	Dan A. Surra	Re-elected	Democratic	Dan A. Surra	8,661	65.47
75	Democratic	Dan A. Surra	Re-elected	Republican	Victor C. Straub	4,567	34.53
76	Democratic	Mike Hanna	Re-elected	Democratic	Mike Hanna	12,817	67.48
76	Democratic	Mike Hanna	Re-elected	Republican	Jim Rogers	6,176	32.52
77	Republican	Lynn Herman	Re-elected	Republican	Lynn Herman	11,717	58.74
77	Republican	Lynn Herman	Re-elected	Democratic	Scott Conklin	8,229	41.26
78	Republican	Dick Hess	Re-elected	Republican	Dick Hess	17,148	77.34
78	Republican	Dick Hess	Re-elected	Democratic	John H. Fair	5,024	22.66
79	Republican	Richard Geist	Re-elected	Republican	Richard Geist	16,570	100.00
80	Republican	Jerry Stern	Re-elected	Republican	Jerry Stern	15,144	80.19
80	Republican	Jerry Stern	Re-elected	Democratic	John P. Harker	3,740	19.81
81	Republican	Larry Sather	Re-elected	Republican	Larry Sather	16,290	100.00
82	Republican	Daniel F. Clark	Re-elected	Republican	Daniel F. Clark	14,866	74.96
82	Republican	Daniel F. Clark	Re-elected	Democratic	Damien F. Henry	4,967	25.04
83	Republican	Thomas W. Dempsey	Re-elected	Republican	Thomas W. Dempsey	13,256	100.00
84	Republican	Brett Feese	Re-elected	Republican	Brett Feese	15,042	100.00
85	Republican	Russ Fairchild	Re-elected	Republican	Russ Fairchild	16,184	100.00
86	Republican	Allan Egolf	Re-elected	Republican	Allan Egolf	15,341	78.33
86	Republican	Allan Egolf	Re-elected	Democratic	Phil Drumheiser	4,244	21.67
87	Republican	Pat Vance	Re-elected	Republican	Pat Vance	21,923	100.00
88	Republican	Jerry L. Nailor	Re-elected	Republican	Jerry L. Nailor	19,975	77.92
88	Republican	Jerry L. Nailor	Re-elected	Democratic	Julius Uehlein	5,661	22.08
89	Democratic	Jeffrey Coy	Re-elected	Democratic	Jeffrey Coy	11,332	50.85
89	Democratic	Jeffrey Coy	Re-elected	Republican	Timothy B. Bittle	10,953	49.15
90	Republican	Patrick Fleagle	Re-elected	Republican	Patrick Fleagle	17,629	100.00
91	Republican	Stephen Maitland	Re-elected	Republican	Stephen Maitland	16,457	74.04
91	Republican	Stephen Maitland	Re-elected	Democratic	Larry B. Feeser Jr.	5,769	25.96
92	Republican	Bruce I. Smith	Re-elected	Republican	Bruce I. Smith	15,972	72.72
92	Republican	Bruce I. Smith	Re-elected	Democratic	Frank Fortino	5,742	26.14
92	Republican	Bruce I. Smith	Re-elected	Independent	Marlin D. Cutshall	251	1.14
93	Republican	Mike Waugh	Re-elected	Republican	Mike Waugh	17,122	73.32
93	Republican	Mike Waugh	Re-elected	Democratic	Joseph Joe Sacco	6,231	26.68
94	Republican	Stan Saylor	Re-elected	Republican	Stan Saylor	16,173	74.95
94	Republican	Stan Saylor	Re-elected	Democratic	Sterling L. Fritz	5,406	25.05
95	Democratic	Stephen Stetler	Re-elected	Democratic	Stephen Stetler	10,778	67.24
95	Democratic	Stephen Stetler	Re-elected	Republican	Mark L. Althouse	5,250	32.76
96	Democratic	Mike Sturla	Re-elected	Democratic	Mike Sturla	8,389	56.69
96	Democratic	Mike Sturla	Re-elected	Republican	C. Ted Darcus	6,409	43.31
97	Republican	Jere Strittmatter	Re-elected	Republican	Jere Strittmatter	18,662	68.59
97	Republican	Jere Strittmatter	Re-elected	Democratic	Erik Brown	8,548	31.41
98	Republican	Thomas E. Armstrong	Re-elected	Republican	Thomas E. Armstrong	13,847	68.30
98	Republican	Thomas E. Armstrong	Re-elected	Democratic	George Leyh	6,426	31.70
99	Republican	Leroy M. Zimmerman	Re-elected	Republican	Leroy M. Zimmerman	15,339	80.86
99	Republican	Leroy M. Zimmerman	Re-elected	Democratic	Donald R. Axon	3,631	19.14
100	Republican	John E. Barley	Re-elected	Republican	John E. Barley	13,638	71.11
100	Republican	John E. Barley	Re-elected	Democratic	John F. Haser Jr.	5,308	27.68
100	Republican	John E. Barley	Re-elected	Natural Law	Marsha Ramananantoandro	232	1.21
101	Republican	Edward H. Krebs	Re-elected	Republican	Edward H. Krebs	13,248	65.68
101	Republican	Edward H. Krebs	Re-elected	Democratic	Paul A. Heise	6,924	34.32
102	Republican	Peter Zug	Re-elected	Republican	Peter Zug	14,521	100.00
103	Democratic	Ron Buxton	Re-elected	Democratic	Ron Buxton	14,580	100.00
104	Republican	Jeff Haste	Retired	Republican	Mark S. McNaughton	14,205	61.47
104	Republican	Jeff Haste	Retired	Democratic	Diane Bowman	8,904	38.53
105	Republican	Ron Marsico	Re-elected	Republican	Ron Marsico	20,247	74.95
105	Republican	Ron Marsico	Re-elected	Democratic	Jack C. Garner	6,768	25.05
106	Republican	Frank Tulli	Re-elected	Republican	Frank Tulli	18,206	76.29
106	Republican	Frank Tulli	Re-elected	Democratic	Mike Pries	5,659	23.71
107	Democratic	Robert Belfanti	Re-elected	Democratic	Robert Belfanti	14,311	73.26
107	Democratic	Robert Belfanti	Re-elected	Republican	Chris Pfaff	5,224	26.74
108	Republican	Merle Phillips	Re-elected	Republican	Merle Phillips	14,366	100.00
109	Democratic	John Gordner	Re-elected	Democratic	John Gordner	17,857	100.00
110	Republican	J. Scot Chadwick	Re-elected	Republican	J. Scot Chadwick	17,443	100.00
111	Republican	Sandra Major	Re-elected	Republican	Sandra Major	19,053	100.00
112	Democratic	Fred Belardi	Re-elected	Democratic	Fred Belardi	13,901	74.60
112	Democratic	Fred Belardi	Re-elected	Republican	Don Alward	4,732	25.40
113	Democratic	Gaynor Cawley	Re-elected	Democratic	Gaynor Cawley	14,725	100.00
114	Republican	Frank Serafini	Re-elected	Republican	Frank Serafini	15,089	100.00
115	Democratic	Edward Staback	Re-elected	Democratic	Edward Staback	17,482	100.00
116	Republican	Tom Stish	Defeated (Note: Switched to the Republican Party after winning as a Democrat in 1994.)	Democratic	Todd Eachus	10,000	53.17
116	Republican	Tom Stish	Defeated	Republican	Tom Stish	8,806	46.83
117	Republican	George Hasay	Re-elected	Republican	George Hasay	12,449	100.00
118	Democratic	Thomas Tigue	Re-elected	Democratic	Thomas Tigue	16,019	100.00
119	Democratic	Stanley Jarolin	Re-elected	Democratic	Stanley Jarolin	14,174	100.00
120	Democratic	Phyllis Mundy	Re-elected	Democratic	Phyllis Mundy	14,493	64.70
120	Democratic	Phyllis Mundy	Re-elected	Republican	William Bill James	7,909	35.30
121	Democratic	Kevin Blaum	Re-elected	Democratic	Kevin Blaum	12,240	100.00
122	Democratic	Keith R. McCall	Re-elected	Democratic	Keith R. McCall	13,467	68.86
122	Democratic	Keith R. McCall	Re-elected	Republican	Todd D. Koller	6,091	31.14
123	Democratic	Edward Lucyk	Re-elected	Democratic	Edward Lucyk	20,142	100.00
124	Republican	Dave Argall	Re-elected	Republican	Dave Argall	15,488	70.91
124	Republican	Dave Argall	Re-elected	Democratic	Dennis Baylor	6,353	29.09
125	Republican	Bob Allen	Re-elected	Republican	Bob Allen	14,301	69.64
125	Republican	Bob Allen	Re-elected	Democratic	Karl Zeller	6,235	30.36
126	Democratic	Dante Santoni	Re-elected	Democratic	Dante Santoni	13,147	62.25
126	Democratic	Dante Santoni	Re-elected	Republican	Kathleen A. Wolfe	7,971	37.75
127	Democratic	Thomas Caltagirone	Re-elected	Democratic	Thomas Caltagirone	8,683	66.48
127	Democratic	Thomas Caltagirone	Re-elected	Republican	Robin Costenbader-Jacobson	4,379	33.52
128	Republican	Sam Rohrer	Re-elected	Republican	Sam Rohrer	15,249	61.89
128	Republican	Sam Rohrer	Re-elected	Democratic	Jonathan F. Meter	9,388	38.11
129	Republican	Sheila Miller	Re-elected	Republican	Sheila Miller	17,677	75.11
129	Republican	Sheila Miller	Re-elected	Democratic	Cathleen Palm	5,859	24.89
130	Republican	Dennis Leh	Re-elected	Republican	Dennis Leh	13,972	68.27
130	Republican	Dennis Leh	Re-elected	Democratic	Kevin G. Poole	6,495	31.73
131	Republican	Pat Browne	Re-elected	Republican	Pat Browne	8,104	52.14
131	Republican	Pat Browne	Re-elected	Democratic	Kurt J. Derr	7,440	47.86
132	Republican	Charlie Dent	Re-elected	Republican	Charlie Dent	11,551	67.49
132	Republican	Charlie Dent	Re-elected	Democratic	Daniel K. McCarthy	5,565	32.51
133	Democratic	T. J. Rooney	Re-elected	Democratic	T. J. Rooney	9,721	57.81
133	Democratic	T. J. Rooney	Re-elected	Republican	Andy Roman	7,094	42.19
134	Republican	Donald Snyder	Re-elected	Republican	Donald Snyder	18,697	88.69
134	Republican	Donald Snyder	Re-elected	Reform	Omar J. Lederer	2,384	11.31
135	Democratic	Lisa Boscola	Re-elected	Democratic	Lisa Boscola	15,263	68.67
135	Democratic	Lisa Boscola	Re-elected	Republican	Manus P. Maclean	6,964	31.33
136	Democratic	Joseph Corpora	Re-elected	Democratic	Joseph Corpora	10,551	62.54
136	Democratic	Joseph Corpora	Re-elected	Republican	Brian E. Ahearn	6,319	37.46
137	Republican	Leonard Gruppo	Re-elected	Republican	Leonard Gruppo	15,926	66.84
137	Republican	Leonard Gruppo	Re-elected	Democratic	Ritchey J. Ricci	7,901	33.16
138	Republican	Robert Nyce	Retired to run for Auditor General	Republican	Craig Dally	12,633	58.67
138	Republican	Robert Nyce	Retired to run for Auditor General	Democratic	Marilyn Lieberman	8,899	41.33
139	Republican	Jerry Birmelin	Re-elected	Republican	Jerry Birmelin	16,821	100.00
140	Democratic	Thomas C. Corrigan	Re-elected	Democratic	Thomas C. Corrigan	13,638	72.32
140	Democratic	Thomas C. Corrigan	Re-elected	Republican	Jenna A. Kostaras	5,221	27.68
141	Democratic	Anthony Melio	Re-elected	Democratic	Anthony Melio	13,205	74.01
141	Democratic	Anthony Melio	Re-elected	Republican	Richard J. Gosin Sr.	4,638	25.99
142	Republican	Matthew N. Wright	Re-elected	Republican	Matthew N. Wright	14,661	63.50
142	Republican	Matthew N. Wright	Re-elected	Democratic	Robert C. Sooby	8,428	36.50
143	Republican	Joe Conti	Re-elected	Republican	Joe Conti	18,433	62.11
143	Republican	Joe Conti	Re-elected	Democratic	Melissa V. Bond	11,243	37.89
144	Republican	Thomas W. Druce	Re-elected	Republican	Thomas W. Druce	16,991	92.16
144	Republican	Thomas W. Druce	Re-elected	Libertarian	Donald R. McGeady	1,445	7.84
145	Republican	Paul Clymer	Re-elected	Republican	Paul Clymer	13,424	64.67
145	Republican	Paul Clymer	Re-elected	Democratic	Suzanne Hendricks	6,673	32.15
145	Republican	Paul Clymer	Re-elected	Libertarian	H. Antoinette Hilmer	661	3.18
146	Republican	Robert Reber	Re-elected	Republican	Robert Reber	10,402	57.70
146	Republican	Robert Reber	Re-elected	Democratic	Bill Fontaine	7,627	42.30
147	Republican	Raymond Bunt	Re-elected	Republican	Raymond Bunt	16,541	88.97
147	Republican	Raymond Bunt	Re-elected	Libertarian	Robert H. Cassel	2,051	11.03
148	Republican	Lita Indzel Cohen	Re-elected	Republican	Lita Indzel Cohen	18,047	66.31
148	Republican	Lita Indzel Cohen	Re-elected	Democratic	Joseph McCaffrey	9,170	33.69
149	Republican	Colleen Sheehan	Defeated	Democratic	Constance H. Williams	13,487	50.96
149	Republican	Colleen Sheehan	Defeated	Republican	Colleen Sheehan	12,981	49.04
150	Republican	John A. Lawless	Re-elected	Republican	John A. Lawless	14,972	100.00
151	Republican	Eugene McGill	Re-elected	Republican	Eugene McGill	14,742	62.69
151	Republican	Eugene McGill	Re-elected	Democratic	F. Lydell Clark	8,774	37.31
152	Republican	Roy Cornell	Re-elected	Republican	Roy Cornell	15,560	66.88
152	Republican	Roy Cornell	Re-elected	Democratic	Elinda Fishman Kiss	6,625	28.48
152	Republican	Roy Cornell	Re-elected	Libertarian	Peter J. Mergen	1,081	4.65
153	Republican	Ellen Bard	Re-elected	Republican	Ellen Bard	14,875	60.40
153	Republican	Ellen Bard	Re-elected	Democratic	Alex Katz	8,501	34.52
153	Republican	Ellen Bard	Re-elected	Laub State Rep	Martin L. Laub	743	3.02
153	Republican	Ellen Bard	Re-elected	Libertarian	Brian D. McHugh	508	2.06
154	Democratic	Lawrence Curry	Re-elected	Democratic	Lawrence Curry	18,807	68.59
154	Democratic	Lawrence Curry	Re-elected	Republican	Lisa Friebel	8,612	31.41
155	Republican	Curt Schroder	Re-elected	Republican	Curt Schroder	18,861	100.00
156	Republican	Elinor Z. Taylor	Re-elected	Republican	Elinor Z. Taylor	16,054	65.98
156	Republican	Elinor Z. Taylor	Re-elected	Democratic	John Gregory Schell	8,279	34.02
157	Republican	Carole A. Rubley	Re-elected	Republican	Carole A. Rubley	17,546	69.01
157	Republican	Carole A. Rubley	Re-elected	Democratic	Linda Else Leighbody	7,879	30.99
158	Republican	Joe Pitts	Retired to run for Congress	Republican	L. Chris Ross	19,636	100.00
159	Democratic	Thaddeus Kirkland	Re-elected	Democratic	Thaddeus Kirkland	9,985	70.57
159	Democratic	Thaddeus Kirkland	Re-elected	Republican	Hampton Evans	4,164	29.43
160	Republican	Kathrynann Durham	Retired	Republican	Stephen Barrar	13,114	52.25
160	Republican	Kathrynann Durham	Retired	Democratic	Ben Lopchinsky	11,985	47.75
161	Republican	Tom Gannon	Re-elected	Republican	Tom Gannon	15,552	63.31
161	Republican	Tom Gannon	Re-elected	Democratic	Nick Anastasio	9,011	36.69
162	Republican	Ronald C. Raymond	Re-elected	Republican	Ronald C. Raymond	12,490	63.55
162	Republican	Ronald C. Raymond	Re-elected	Democratic	Dorothy Gallagher	7,163	36.45
163	Republican	Nicholas Micozzie	Re-elected	Republican	Nicholas Micozzie	15,496	66.78
163	Republican	Nicholas Micozzie	Re-elected	Democratic	Ron Morin	7,710	33.22
164	Republican	Mario Civera	Re-elected	Republican	Mario Civera	14,990	67.81
164	Republican	Mario Civera	Re-elected	Democratic	Carol A. Purfield	7,116	32.19
165	Republican	Bill Adolph	Re-elected	Republican	Bill Adolph	18,954	67.15
165	Republican	Bill Adolph	Re-elected	Democratic	Joan Coper	9,273	32.85
166	Democratic	Greg Vitali	Re-elected	Democratic	Greg Vitali	16,923	58.66
166	Democratic	Greg Vitali	Re-elected	Republican	Steve Stinson	11,925	41.34
167	Republican	Bob Flick	Re-elected	Republican	Bob Flick	21,334	100.00
168	Republican	Matthew J. Ryan	Re-elected	Republican	Matthew J. Ryan	18,826	68.87
168	Republican	Matthew J. Ryan	Re-elected	Democratic	Wilma Hutcheson-Williams	8,510	31.13
169	Republican	Dennis M. O'Brien	Re-elected	Republican	Dennis M. O'Brien	14,025	72.74
169	Republican	Dennis M. O'Brien	Re-elected	Democratic	Michael McGuigan	5,257	27.26
170	Republican	George T. Kenney	Re-elected	Republican	George T. Kenney	13,042	65.94
170	Republican	George T. Kenney	Re-elected	Democratic	Michael J. Rowley	6,412	32.42
170	Republican	George T. Kenney	Re-elected	Libertarian	Steven J. Gilber	325	1.64
171	Democratic	Ruth Rudy	Retired	Republican	Kerry Benninghoff	14,077	61.09
171	Democratic	Ruth Rudy	Retired	Democratic	Keith Bierly	8,965	38.91
172	Republican	John Perzel	Re-elected	Republican	John Perzel	13,473	58.82
172	Republican	John Perzel	Re-elected	Democratic	Michelle McMenamin	9,433	41.18
173	Democratic	Michael McGeehan	Re-elected	Democratic	Michael McGeehan	14,045	80.12
173	Democratic	Michael McGeehan	Re-elected	Republican	John L. Boyle	3,484	19.88
174	Democratic	Alan Butkovitz	Re-elected	Democratic	Alan Butkovitz	15,584	75.25
174	Democratic	Alan Butkovitz	Re-elected	Republican	Marie D. Cantwell	4,533	21.89
174	Democratic	Alan Butkovitz	Re-elected	Libertarian	Joseph M. Sabatina	592	2.86
175	Democratic	Marie Lederer	Re-elected	Democratic	Marie Lederer	12,587	73.16
175	Democratic	Marie Lederer	Re-elected	Republican	Anthony N. Radocaj	4,617	26.84
176	Republican	Christopher Wogan	Re-elected	Republican	Christopher Wogan	13,663	64.56
176	Republican	Christopher Wogan	Re-elected	Democratic	Bill Fox	7,501	35.44
177	Republican	John J. Taylor	Re-elected	Republican	John J. Taylor	9,960	64.04
177	Republican	John J. Taylor	Re-elected	Democratic	Anthony W. Farnon Jr.	5,593	35.96
178	Republican	Roy Reinard	Re-elected	Republican	Roy Reinard	17,309	67.32
178	Republican	Roy Reinard	Re-elected	Democratic	David M. Hall	8,401	32.68
179	Democratic	William Rieger	Re-elected	Democratic	William Rieger	11,232	89.48
179	Democratic	William Rieger	Re-elected	Republican	Jon Mirowitz	1,320	10.52
180	Democratic	Benjamin Ramos	Re-elected	Democratic	Benjamin Ramos	11,826	100.00
181	Democratic	Curtis Thomas	Re-elected	Democratic	Curtis Thomas	16,627	92.05
181	Democratic	Curtis Thomas	Re-elected	Republican	Sam A. Sam	1,207	6.68
181	Democratic	Curtis Thomas	Re-elected	Libertarian	John J. Featherman	229	1.27
182	Democratic	Babette Josephs	Re-elected	Democratic	Babette Josephs	17,655	78.94
182	Democratic	Babette Josephs	Re-elected	Republican	Thomas C. Baggio	4,709	21.06
183	Republican	Julie Harhart	Re-elected	Republican	Julie Harhart	9,836	50.47
183	Republican	Julie Harhart	Re-elected	Democratic	Frank W. Yandrisevits	9,652	49.53
184	Democratic	William F. Keller	Re-elected	Democratic	William F. Keller	12,872	76.01
184	Democratic	William F. Keller	Re-elected	Republican	Michael Mikstas	4,062	23.99
185	Democratic	Robert Donatucci	Re-elected	Democratic	Robert Donatucci	13,355	74.68
185	Democratic	Robert Donatucci	Re-elected	Republican	Anthony J. Giordano	4,529	25.32
186	Democratic	Harold James	Re-elected	Democratic	Harold James	16,867	91.24
186	Democratic	Harold James	Re-elected	Republican	Wallace D. Delaney	1,620	8.76
187	Republican	Paul Semmel	Re-elected	Republican	Paul Semmel	14,669	65.91
187	Republican	Paul Semmel	Re-elected	Democratic	Arlene Dabrow	7,587	34.09
188	Democratic	James R. Roebuck Jr.	Re-elected	Democratic	James R. Roebuck Jr.	15,674	95.10
188	Democratic	James R. Roebuck Jr.	Re-elected	Republican	Kelly Dutton	807	4.90
189	Democratic	Joseph Battisto	Re-elected	Democratic	Joseph Battisto	13,361	63.55
189	Democratic	Joseph Battisto	Re-elected	Republican	Art Rodriguez	7,663	36.45
190	Democratic	Michael Horsey	Re-elected	Democratic	Michael Horsey	16,166	94.47
190	Democratic	Michael Horsey	Re-elected	Republican	Gus E. Lacy Jr.	946	5.53
191	Democratic	Anthony H. Williams	Re-elected	Democratic	Anthony H. Williams	16,264	88.59
191	Democratic	Anthony H. Williams	Re-elected	Republican	Francis X. Hardy	2,094	11.41
192	Democratic	Louise Bishop	Re-elected	Democratic	Louise Bishop	19,203	100.00
193	Republican	Steven R. Nickol	Re-elected	Republican	Steven R. Nickol	15,737	100.00
194	Democratic	Kathy Manderino	Re-elected	Democratic	Kathy Manderino	16,193	95.40
194	Democratic	Kathy Manderino	Re-elected	Libertarian	Joseph J. McCarthy	781	4.60
195	Democratic	Frank L. Oliver	Re-elected	Democratic	Frank L. Oliver	16,836	90.78
195	Democratic	Frank L. Oliver	Re-elected	Republican	David C. Thomsen	1,710	9.22
196	Republican	Todd Platts	Re-elected	Republican	Todd Platts	18,023	74.50
196	Republican	Todd Platts	Re-elected	Democratic	Barbara J. Spangler	6,169	25.50
197	Democratic	Andrew Carn	Re-elected	Democratic	Andrew Carn	19,321	96.74
197	Democratic	Andrew Carn	Re-elected	Republican	Sundai Mtunda	652	3.26
198	Democratic	Rosita Youngblood	Re-elected	Democratic	Rosita Youngblood	18,639	88.17
198	Democratic	Rosita Youngblood	Re-elected	Republican	Edwin H. Hopton Jr.	2,501	11.83
199	Republican	Albert Masland	Re-elected	Republican	Albert Masland	16,787	79.18
199	Republican	Albert Masland	Re-elected	Democratic	Bill Sloane	4,413	20.82
200	Democratic	LeAnna Washington	Re-elected	Democratic	LeAnna Washington	20,581	87.18
200	Democratic	LeAnna Washington	Re-elected	Republican	Thomas J. Cullen	3,026	12.82
201	Democratic	John L. Myers	Re-elected	Democratic	John L. Myers	18,896	96.27
201	Democratic	John L. Myers	Re-elected	Republican	Joseph Louis Messa	733	3.73
202	Democratic	Mark B. Cohen	Re-elected	Democratic	Mark B. Cohen	14,537	84.82
202	Democratic	Mark B. Cohen	Re-elected	Republican	Gail L. Abrams	2,415	14.09
202	Democratic	Mark B. Cohen	Re-elected	Libertarian	Terrence W. Zellers	186	1.09
203	Democratic	Dwight Evans	Re-elected	Democratic	Dwight Evans	18,781	93.95
203	Democratic	Dwight Evans	Re-elected	Republican	John Paul Mugford	1,209	6.05
