= 2000 Pennsylvania House of Representatives election =

- November 7, 2000

All 203 seats in the Pennsylvania House of Representatives 102 seats needed for a majority
	Majority party	Minority party
Leader	Matt Ryan	Bill DeWeese
Party	Republican	Democratic
Leader since	January 3, 1995	January 3, 1995
Leader's seat	168th District	50th District
Last election	103	100
Seats before	102	101
Seats after	104	99
Seat change	▲2	▼2
- Results: Republican gain Republican hold Democratic hold
Speaker before election
Matt Ryan
Republican
Elected Speaker
Matt Ryan
Republican

Elections for the Pennsylvania House of Representatives were held on November 7, 2000, with all districts being contested. State Representatives are elected for two-year terms, with the entire House of Representatives up for a vote every two years. The term of office for those elected in 2000 ran from January 3, 2001, until November 30, 2002. Necessary primary elections were held on April 4, 2000.

== Notable elections ==
=== Retirements ===
Republican Todd Platts was elected to represent Pennsylvania's 19th congressional district, allowing fellow Republican Beverly D. Mackereth to take his seat in the 119th legislative district.

In the 54th legislative district, Terry Van Horne was succeeded by fellow Democrat John Pallone. Van Horne was an unsuccessful candidate for Congress, losing to Republican Pennsylvania State Senator Melissa Hart in the election for Pennsylvania's 4th congressional district.

In the 37th legislative district, Republican Katie True left her seat to run as the Republican nominee for Pennsylvania Auditor General, eventually losing the election to Democrat Bob Casey, Jr. Her fellow Republican, Thomas C. Creighton, succeeded her. True would eventually return to the House in the newly redistricted 41st legislative district in the 2002 election.

=== Democratic primary upsets in Philadelphia ===
In the 180th legislative district, Democratic incumbent Benjamin Ramos was defeated by Angel Cruz, who went on to easily win the general election. In the 197th legislative district, Democratic incumbent Andrew J. Carn was defeated by Jewell Williams, who also went on to easily win the general election.

=== 60th legislative district ===
In the 60th legislative district, incumbent Tim Pesci was defeated in his re-election bid by 25-year-old Republican Jeff Coleman, in spite of the district being 70% Democratic. Bill DeWeese, the House Democratic Leader, said that Pesci had run a "condescending" race against Coleman, calling his opponent "Jeffy" and describing Coleman's campaign volunteers as "the Children from the Corn," referring to the horror film.

=== 189th legislative district ===
In the 189th legislative district, Democratic incumbent Joseph W. Battisto was defeated by Republican Kelly Lewis. Battisto attempted a comeback in a 2002 special election for the 176th legislative district, but lost to Mario Scavello.

== General election ==
District	Party	Incumbent	Status	Party	Candidate	Votes	%
1	Democratic	Linda Bebko-Jones	Re-elected	Democratic	Linda Bebko-Jones	14,166	100.0
2	Democratic	Italo Cappabianca	Re-elected	Democratic	Italo Cappabianca	15,354	100.0
3	Republican	Karl Boyes	Re-elected	Republican	Karl Boyes	28,496	100.0
4	Democratic	Thomas J. Scrimenti	Re-elected	Democratic	Thomas J. Scrimenti	15,637	65.8
4	Democratic	Thomas J. Scrimenti	Re-elected	Republican	David E. Mitchell	8,139	34.2
5	Republican	R. Tracy Seyfert	Resigned	Republican	John R. Evans	15,875	68.5
5	Republican	R. Tracy Seyfert	Resigned	Democratic	Karen L. Mulkearn	7,310	31.5
6	Republican	Teresa E. Forcier	Re-elected	Republican	Teresa E. Forcier	14,697	100.0
7	Democratic	Michael C. Gruitza	Re-elected	Democratic	Michael C. Gruitza	14,055	60.9
7	Democratic	Michael C. Gruitza	Re-elected	Republican	Jack R. Kopen	9,038	39.1
8	Republican	Howard L. Fargo	Retired	Republican	Dick Stevenson	13,253	63.2
8	Republican	Howard L. Fargo	Retired	Democratic	James C. Coulter	7,708	36.8
9	Democratic	Chris Sainato	Re-elected	Democratic	Chris Sainato	16,019	68.2
9	Democratic	Chris Sainato	Re-elected	Republican	Jennifer Nicholson	7,459	31.8
10	Democratic	Frank LaGrotta	Re-elected	Democratic	Frank LaGrotta	19,167	100.0
11	Democratic	Guy A. Travaglio, Jr.	Re-elected	Democratic	Guy A. Travaglio, Jr.	16,036	67.6
11	Democratic	Guy A. Travaglio, Jr.	Re-elected	Republican	Mike Rock	7,691	32.4
12	Republican	Daryl Metcalfe	Re-elected	Republican	Daryl Metcalfe	25,785	86.3
12	Republican	Daryl Metcalfe	Re-elected	Independent	Louis P. Hancherick	4,099	13.7
13	Republican	Art Hershey	Re-elected	Republican	Art Hershey	17,731	100.0
14	Democratic	Mike Veon	Re-elected	Democratic	Mike Veon	15,183	72.8
14	Democratic	Mike Veon	Re-elected	Republican	Jeffrey T. Kording	5,687	27.3
15	Democratic	Nicholas A. Colafella	Re-elected	Democratic	Nicholas A. Colafella	20,908	89.3
15	Democratic	Nicholas A. Colafella	Re-elected	Constitution	Gordon Johnston	2,505	10.7
16	Democratic	Susan Laughlin	Re-elected	Democratic	Susan Laughlin	16,748	70.4
16	Democratic	Susan Laughlin	Re-elected	Republican	Sarah Ferguson	7,032	29.6
17	Republican	Rod E. Wilt	Re-elected	Republican	Rod E. Wilt	16,348	100.0
18	Republican	Gene DiGirolamo	re-elected	Republican	Gene DiGirolamo	14,453	100.0
19	Democratic	William Russell Robinson	Re-elected	Democratic	William Russell Robinson	13,053	89.1
19	Democratic	William Russell Robinson	Re-elected	Republican	Erin L. Connolly	1,596	10.9
20	Democratic	Don Walko	Re-elected	Democratic	Don Walko	14,266	94.9
20	Democratic	Don Walko	Re-elected	Libertarian	Charles Stutler	762	5.1
21	Democratic	Frank J. Pistella	Re-elected	Democratic	Frank J. Pistella	15,692	100.0
22	Democratic	Frank J. Gigliotti	Resigned	Democratic	Michael Diven	15,047	78.2
22	Democratic	Frank J. Gigliotti	Resigned	Republican	Harry T. Lewellen	4,196	21.8
23	Democratic	Dan Frankel	Re-elected	Democratic	Dan Frankel	18,035	100.0
24	Democratic	Joseph Preston, Jr.	Re-elected	Democratic	Joseph Preston, Jr.	16,562	100.0
25	Democratic	Joe Markosek	Re-elected	Democratic	Joe Markosek	18,165	100.0
26	Republican	Tim Hennessey	Re-elected	Republican	Tim Hennessey	12,273	58.0
26	Republican	Tim Hennessey	Re-elected	Democratic	Cheryl C. Spaulding	8,881	42.0
27	Democratic	Tom Petrone	Re-elected	Democratic	Tom Petrone	15,786	88.3
27	Democratic	Tom Petrone	Re-elected	Green	Curt Larson	1v513	8.5
27	Democratic	Tom Petrone	Re-elected	Reform	Frank Liberatore	573	3.2
28	Republican	Jane Orie	Re-elected	Republican	Jane Orie	26,269	100.0
29	Democratic	David J. Mayernik	Re-elected	Democratic	David J. Mayernik	25,918	100.0
30	Republican	Jeff Habay	Re-elected	Republican	Jeff Habay	29,154	100.0
31	Republican	David J. Steil	Re-elected	Republican	David J. Steil	24,547	100.0
32	Democratic	Anthony M. DeLuca	Re-elected	Democratic	Anthony M. DeLuca	16,577	67.3
32	Democratic	Anthony M. DeLuca	Re-elected	Republican	Bob Sevcik	8,068	32.7
33	Democratic	Frank Dermody	Re-elected	Democratic	Frank Dermody	15,198	59.5
33	Democratic	Frank Dermody	Re-elected	Republican	Vince Mercuri	10,350	40.5
34	Democratic	Paul Costa	Re-elected	Democratic	Paul Costa	18,266	74.4
34	Democratic	Paul Costa	Re-elected	Republican	James Carmine	6,279	25.6
35	Democratic	Thomas A. Michlovic	Re-elected	Democratic	Thomas A. Michlovic	13,736	100.0
36	Democratic	Harry Readshaw	Re-elected	Democratic	Harry Readshaw	18,489	100.0
37	Republican	Katie True	Unsuccessful candidate for Pennsylvania Auditor General	Republican	Tom Creighton	19,212	74.3
37	Republican	Katie True	Unsuccessful candidate for Pennsylvania Auditor General	Democratic	Deb Hayes	6,662	25.7
38	Democratic	Kenneth W. Ruffing	Re-elected	Democratic	Kenneth W. Ruffing	17,066	100.0
39	Democratic	David K. Levdansky	Re-elected	Democratic	David K. Levdansky	14,274	60.1
39	Democratic	David K. Levdansky	Re-elected	Republican	Mary Larcinese	9,484	39.9
40	Republican	John A. Maher	Re-elected	Republican	John A. Maher	23,839	100.0
41	Democratic	Ralph Kaiser	Re-elected	Democratic	Ralph Kaiser	19,842	69.7
41	Democratic	Ralph Kaiser	Re-elected	Republican	Ron Arnoni	8,637	30.3
42	Republican	Thomas L. Stevenson	Re-elected	Republican	Thomas L. Stevenson	16,878	55.2
42	Republican	Thomas L. Stevenson	Re-elected	Democratic	Michael J. Finnerty	13,706	44.8
43	Republican	Jere W. Schuler	Re-elected	Republican	Jere W. Schuler	18,697	100.0
44	Republican	John Pippy	Re-elected	Republican	John Pippy	25,494	100.0
45	Democratic	Fred A. Trello	Re-elected	Democratic	Fred A. Trello	18,388	100.0
46	Democratic	Victor Lescovitz	Re-elected	Democratic	Victor Lescovitz	16,290	67.5
46	Democratic	Victor Lescovitz	Re-elected	Republican	Hugh K. Bagley	7,853	32.5
47	Democratic	Leo Joseph Trich, Jr.	Re-elected	Democratic	Leo J. Trich, Jr.	11,701	58.0
47	Democratic	Leo Joseph Trich, Jr.	Re-elected	Republican	Cody Knotts	8,465	42.0
48	Democratic	Timothy J. Solobay	Re-elected	Democratic	Timothy J. Solobay	21,063	92.0
48	Democratic	Timothy J. Solobay	Re-elected	Green	Demo Agoris	1,832	8.0
49	Democratic	Peter J. Daley II	Re-elected	Democratic	Peter J. Daley II	17706	100.0
50	Democratic	H. William DeWeese	Re-elected	Democratic	H. William Deweese	13,206	62.4
50	Democratic	H. William DeWeese	Re-elected	Republican	Lynda Bush	7,942	37.6
51	Democratic	Lawrence Roberts	Re-elected	Democratic	Lawrence Roberts	12,353	100.0
52	Democratic	James E. Shaner	Re-elected	Democratic	James E. Shaner	13,582	100.0
53	Republican	Robert Godshall	Re-elected	Republican	Robert Godshall	16,106	70.1
53	Republican	Robert Godshall	Re-elected	Democratic	David O'Brien	6,878	29.9
54	Democratic	Terry E. Van Horne	Unsuccessful candidate for Congress	Democratic	John Pallone	14,561	100.0
55	Democratic	Joseph A. Petrarca	Re-elected	Democratic	Joseph A. Petrarca	15,708	74.6
55	Democratic	Joseph A. Petrarca	Re-elected	Republican	Richard E. Wajdic	5,347	25.4
56	Democratic	James E. Casorio, Jr.	Re-elected	Democratic	James E. Casorio, Jr.	17,691	66.3
56	Democratic	James E. Casorio, Jr.	Re-elected	Republican	Dane A. Medich	8,976	33.7
57	Democratic	Thomas A. Tangretti	Re-elected	Democratic	Thomas A. Tangretti	15,510	68.0
57	Democratic	Thomas A. Tangretti	Re-elected	Republican	Zack Halaut	7,284	32.0
58	Democratic	R. Ted Harhai	Re-elected	Democratic	R. Ted Harhai	16,083	100.0
59	Republican	Jess Stairs	Re-elected	Republican	Jess Stairs	23,534	100.0
60	Democratic	Timothy L. Pesci	defeated	Republican	Jeff Coleman	11,574	51.7
60	Democratic	Timothy L. Pesci	defeated	Democratic	Timothy L. Pesci	10,810	48.3
61	Republican	Joseph M. Gladeck, Jr.	Retired	Republican	Kate M. Harper	17,685	52.1
61	Republican	Joseph M. Gladeck, Jr.	Retired	Democratic	Karen Friedman	15,944	47.0
61	Republican	Joseph M. Gladeck, Jr.	Retired	Libertarian	S. Douglas Leard	312	0.9
62	Democratic	Sara Gerling Steelman	Re-elected	Democratic	Sara G. Steelman	10,918	54.2
62	Democratic	Sara Gerling Steelman	Re-elected	Republican	Rich Gallo	9,210	45.8
63	Republican	Fred McIlhattan	Re-elected	Republican	Fred McIlhattan	21,366	100.0
64	Republican	Scott Hutchinson	Re-elected	Republican	Scott Hutchinson	17,539	100.0
65	Republican	Jim Lynch	Re-elected	Republican	Jim Lynch	16,188	100.0
66	Republican	Samuel H. Smith	Re-elected	Republican	Samuel H. Smith	17,542	100.0
67	Republican	Kenneth M. Jadlowiec	Re-elected	Republican	Kenneth M. Jadlowiec	16,708	100.0
68	Republican	Matt E. Baker	Re-elected	Republican	Matt E. Baker	20,621	100.0
69	Republican	Bob Bastian	Re-elected	Republican	Bob Bastian	19,261	100.0
70	Republican	John W. Fichter	Re-elected	Republican	John W. Fichter	10,470	51.5
70	Republican	John W. Fichter	Re-elected	Democratic	Netta Young Hughes	9,872	48.5
71	Democratic	Edward P. Wojnaroski, Sr.	Re-elected	Democratic	Edward P. Wojnaroski, Sr.	15,444	73.6
71	Democratic	Edward P. Wojnaroski, Sr.	Re-elected	Republican	Thomas Callihan	5,528	26.4
72	Democratic	Tom Yewcic	Re-elected	Democratic	Tom Yewcic	18,846	77.9
72	Democratic	Tom Yewcic	Re-elected	Republican	Arnie McFarland	5,361	22.1
73	Democratic	Gary Haluska	Re-elected	Democratic	Gary Haluska	15,478	73.0
73	Democratic	Gary Haluska	Re-elected	Republican	Francis Holtz	5,731	27.0
74	Democratic	Camille George	Re-elected	Democratic	Camille George	16,265	70.6
74	Democratic	Camille George	Re-elected	Republican	David C. McClure, Sr.	6,789	29.4
75	Democratic	Dan A. Surra	Re-elected	Democratic	Dan A. Surra	17,486	74.3
75	Democratic	Dan A. Surra	Re-elected	Republican	David P. Meier	6,034	25.7
76	Democratic	Michael K. Hanna, Sr.	Re-elected	Democratic	Michael K. Hanna, Sr.	12,280	59.8
76	Democratic	Michael K. Hanna, Sr.	Re-elected	Republican	Glenn W. Thompson, Jr.	8,271	40.2
77	Republican	Lynn B. Herman	Re-elected	Republican	Lynn B. Herman	12,485	62.0
77	Republican	Lynn B. Herman	Re-elected	Democratic	Donald M. Hahn	5,952	29.6
77	Republican	Lynn B. Herman	Re-elected	Green	John R. Stith	1,701	8.4
78	Republican	Dick Hess	Re-elected	Republican	Dick Hess	22,538	100.0
79	Republican	Richard Geist	Re-elected	Republican	Richard Geist	17,187	100.0
80	Republican	Jerry Stern	Re-elected	Republican	Jerry Stern	18,988	100.0
81	Republican	Larry O. Sather	Re-elected	Republican	Larry O. Sather	14,767	71.0
81	Republican	Larry O. Sather	Re-elected	Democratic	Steve Stroman	6,043	29.0
82	Republican	Daniel F. Clark	Re-elected	Republican	Daniel F. Clark	17,983	100.0
83	Republican	Thomas W. Dempsey	Retired	Republican	Steven W. Cappelli	11,717	58.4
83	Republican	Thomas W. Dempsey	Retired	Democratic	Joseph F. Orso	8,353	41.6
84	Republican	Brett O. Feese	Re-elected	Republican	Brett Feese	17,913	81.4
84	Republican	Brett O. Feese	Re-elected	Democratic	Alfred W. Douglas	4,081	18.6
85	Republican	Russ Fairchild	Re-elected	Republican	Russ Fairchild	17,098	88.9
85	Republican	Russ Fairchild	Re-elected	Green	Eric Prindle	2,140	11.1
86	Republican	C. Allan Egolf	Re-elected	Republican	Allan Egolf	18,519	100.0
87	Republican	Pat Vance	Re-elected	Republican	Pat Vance	23,039	77.7
87	Republican	Pat Vance	Re-elected	Democratic	Robert Mustin	6,620	22.3
88	Republican	Jerry L. Nailor	Re-elected	Republican	Jerry L. Nailor	20,583	74.8
88	Republican	Jerry L. Nailor	Re-elected	Democratic	Jama Choquette	6,152	22.4
88	Republican	Jerry L. Nailor	Re-elected	Independent	Donald Reed	464	1.7
88	Republican	Jerry L. Nailor	Re-elected	Libertarian	Otto J. Storey	315	1.1
89	Democratic	Jeffrey W. Coy	Re-elected	Democratic	Jeffrey W. Coy	15,365	63.5
89	Democratic	Jeffrey W. Coy	Re-elected	Republican	Kenneth L. Gill	8,843	36.5
90	Republican	Patrick E. Fleagle	Re-elected	Republican	Patrick E. Fleagle	19,284	100.0
91	Republican	Stephen R. Maitland	Re-elected	Republican	Stephen R. Maitland	18,608	74.1
91	Republican	Stephen R. Maitland	Re-elected	Democratic	Mark D. Berg	6,495	25.9
92	Republican	Bruce Smith	Re-elected	Republican	Bruce Smith	19,386	95.6
92	Republican	Bruce Smith	Re-elected	Independent	Marlin D. Cutshall	893	4.4
93	Republican	Ron Miller	Re-elected	Republican	Ron Miller	19,538	100.0
94	Republican	Stan Saylor	Re-elected	Republican	Stan Saylor	19,332	100.0
95	Democratic	Stephen H. Stetler	Re-elected	Democratic	Stephen H. Stetler	11,010	63.2
95	Democratic	Stephen H. Stetler	Re-elected	Republican	Michele Schanbacher	5,701	32.7
95	Democratic	Stephen H. Stetler	Re-elected	Constitution	Chris A. Poborsky	699	4.0
96	Democratic	Mike Sturla	Re-elected	Democratic	Mike Sturla	9,185	60.6
96	Democratic	Mike Sturla	Re-elected	Republican	Tan Vo	5,981	39.4
97	Republican	Jere L. Strittmatter	Re-elected	Republican	Jere L. Strittmatter	23,363	100.0
98	Republican	Thomas E. Armstrong	Re-elected	Republican	Thomas E. Armstrong	16,009	68.9
98	Republican	Thomas E. Armstrong	Re-elected	Democratic	Gary Spicer	7,227	31.1
99	Republican	Leroy M. Zimmerman	Re-elected	Republican	Leroy M. Zimmerman	17,890	100.0
100	Republican	John E. Barley	Re-elected	Republican	John E. Barley	16,520	73.5
100	Republican	John E. Barley	Re-elected	Democratic	Bruce Beardsley	5,957	26.5
101	Republican	Edward H. Krebs	Re-elected	Republican	Edward H. Krebs	16,088	95.4
101	Republican	Edward H. Krebs	Re-elected	Libertarian	Eric Alan Paul	784	4.6
102	Republican	Peter J. Zug	Re-elected	Republican	Peter J. Zug	14,710	64.7
102	Republican	Peter J. Zug	Re-elected	Democratic	Charlie D. Anspach	8,015	35.3
103	Democratic	Ronald I. Buxton	Re-elected	Democratic	Ronald I. Buxton	13,462	100.0
104	Republican	Mark S. McNaughton	Re-elected	Republican	Mark S. McNaughton	16,627	65.7
104	Republican	Mark S. McNaughton	Re-elected	Democratic	Liz Hrenda	8,662	34.3
105	Republican	Ron Marsico	Re-elected	Republican	Ron Marsico	22,475	75.5
105	Republican	Ron Marsico	Re-elected	Democratic	Darnell L. Williams	7,287	24.5
106	Republican	Frank Tulli, Jr.	Re-elected	Republican	Frank Tulli, Jr.	21,587	90.1
106	Republican	Frank Tulli, Jr.	Re-elected	Constitution	Jeffrey A. Rhine	2,365	9.9
107	Democratic	Robert E. Belfanti, Jr.	Re-elected	Democratic	Robert E. Belfanti, Jr.	14,085	71.0
107	Democratic	Robert E. Belfanti, Jr.	Re-elected	Republican	Chris Pfaff	5,748	29.0
108	Republican	Merle Phillips	Re-elected	Republican	Merle Phillips	16,059	100.0
109	Democratic	John Gordner	Re-elected	Democratic	John Gordner	15,964	79.8
109	Democratic	John Gordner	Re-elected	Republican	Conrad S. Gosciminski, Sr.	4,031	20.2
110	Republican	J. Scot Chadwick	Retired	Republican	Tina Pickett	15,412	68.1
110	Republican	J. Scot Chadwick	Retired	Democratic	Deborah Barr	7,219	31.9
111	Republican	Sandra Major	Re-elected	Republican	Sandra Major	19,614	77.4
111	Republican	Sandra Major	Re-elected	Democratic	Angelo J. Sabbatini	5,713	22.6
112	Democratic	Fred Belardi	Re-elected	Democratic	Fred Belardi	15,233	97.1
112	Democratic	Fred Belardi	Re-elected	Reform	Elizabeth Hubbard	460	2.9
113	Democratic	Gaynor Cawley	Re-elected	Democratic	Gaynor Cawley	16,619	100.0
114	Democratic	Jim Wansacz	Re-elected	Democratic	Jim Wansacz	17,514	60.8
114	Democratic	Jim Wansacz	Re-elected	Republican	Tom Parry	11,130	38.7
114	Democratic	Jim Wansacz	Re-elected	Reform	Leonard J. Skursky, Jr.	149	0.5
115	Democratic	Edward G. Staback	Re-elected	Democratic	Edward G. Staback	19,635	100.0
116	Democratic	Todd A. Eachus	Re-elected	Democratic	Todd A. Eachus	12,114	65.8
116	Democratic	Todd A. Eachus	Re-elected	Republican	Susan Parrick-Cox	6,288	34.2
117	Republican	George C. Hasay	Re-elected	Republican	George C. Hasay	14,190	94.7
117	Republican	George C. Hasay	Re-elected	Independent	Bill Kennard	799	5.3
118	Democratic	Thomas M. Tigue	Re-elected	Democratic	Thomas M. Tigue	16,830	67.9
118	Democratic	Thomas M. Tigue	Re-elected	Republican	Eric F. Villano	7,965	32.1
119	Democratic	John T. Yudichak	Re-elected	Democratic	John T. Yudichak	14,624	100.0
120	Democratic	Phyllis Mundy	Re-elected	Democratic	Phyllis Mundy	14,871	64.1
120	Democratic	Phyllis Mundy	Re-elected	Republican	Shirley A. Moyer	8,320	35.9
121	Democratic	Kevin Blaum	Re-elected	Democratic	Kevin Blaum	11,406	74.7
121	Democratic	Kevin Blaum	Re-elected	Republican	Stephen J. Urban	3,866	25.3
122	Democratic	Keith R. McCall	Re-elected	Democratic	Keith R. McCall	14,945	100.0
123	Democratic	Edward J. Lucyk	Re-elected	Democratic	Edward J. Lucyk	15,586	72.2
123	Democratic	Edward J. Lucyk	Re-elected	Republican	Brian D. Barowski	5,989	27.8
124	Republican	Dave Argall	Re-elected	Republican	Dave Argall	17,724	76.5
124	Republican	Dave Argall	Re-elected	Democratic	Andrew Belsak	5,455	23.5
125	Republican	Bob Allen	Re-elected	Republican	Bob Allen	18,245	100.0
126	Democratic	Dante Santoni, Jr.	Re-elected	Democratic	Dante Santoni, Jr.	15,793	71.0
126	Democratic	Dante Santoni, Jr.	Re-elected	Republican	William Cinfici	6,466	29.0
127	Democratic	Thomas R. Caltagirone	Re-elected	Democratic	Thomas R. Caltagirone	9,290	75.1
127	Democratic	Thomas R. Caltagirone	Re-elected	Republican	Ann B. Chapin	3,075	24.9
128	Republican	Sam Rohrer	Re-elected	Republican	Sam Rohrer	17,250	63.2
128	Republican	Sam Rohrer	Re-elected	Democratic	Tom Herman	10,057	36.8
129	Republican	Shelia Miller	Re-elected	Republican	Shelia Miller	22,270	100.0
130	Republican	Dennis E. Leh	Re-elected	Republican	Dennis E. Leh	16,404	68.0
130	Republican	Dennis E. Leh	Re-elected	Democratic	Charles J. Miller	7,710	32.0
131	Republican	Pat Browne	Re-elected	Republican	Pat Browne	9,599	59.0
131	Republican	Pat Browne	Re-elected	Democratic	Peter J. Antonsen	6,667	41.0
132	Democratic	Jennifer Mann	Re-elected	Democratic	Jennifer Mann	12,678	71.3
132	Democratic	Jennifer Mann	Re-elected	Republican	Robert A. Saurman	5,094	28.7
133	Democratic	T. J. Rooney	Re-elected	Democratic	T. J. Rooney	11,776	65.3
133	Democratic	T. J. Rooney	Re-elected	Republican	Dennis Parsons	6,266	34.7
134	Republican	Donald Snyder	Retired	Republican	Jane S. Baker	15,666	53.4
134	Republican	Donald Snyder	Retired	Democratic	Charles F. Smith, Jr.	13,691	46.6
135	Democratic	Steve Samuelson	Re-elected	Democratic	Steve Samuelson	13,002	52.6
135	Democratic	Steve Samuelson	Re-elected	Republican	Mark S. Mitman	11,733	47.4
136	Democratic	Robert L. Freeman	Re-elected	Democratic	Robert L. Freeman	12,192	100.0
137	Democratic	Richard T. Grucela	Re-elected	Democratic	Richard T. Grucela	15,659	52.3
137	Democratic	Richard T. Grucela	Re-elected	Republican	Leonard Q. Gruppo	14,294	47.7
138	Republican	Craig A. Dally	Re-elected	Republican	Craig A. Dally	17,301	100.0
139	Republican	Jerry Birmelin	Re-elected	Republican	Jerry Birmelin	19,575	93.5
139	Republican	Jerry Birmelin	Re-elected	Independent	C. Mark Edgerton II	1,372	6.6
140	Democratic	Thomas C. Corrigan, Sr.	Re-elected	Democratic	Thomas C. Corrigan, Sr.	15,174	100.0
141	Democratic	Anthony J. Melio	Re-elected	Democratic	Anthony J. Melio	11,267	55.7
141	Democratic	Anthony J. Melio	Re-elected	Republican	Jim Cawley	8,544	42.3
141	Democratic	Anthony J. Melio	Re-elected	Reform	D. Daniel Martino	408	2.0
142	Republican	Matthew N. Wright	Re-elected	Republican	Matthew N. Wright	16,768	100.0
143	Republican	Chuck McIlhinney	Re-elected	Republican	Chuck McIlhinney	21,153	55.0
143	Republican	Chuck McIlhinney	Re-elected	Democratic	Christopher J. Serpico	17310	45.0
144	Republican	Thomas W. Druce	Resigned	Republican	Katharine M. Watson	16,629	57.2
144	Republican	Thomas W. Druce	Resigned	Democratic	David M. Hall	12,167	41.8
144	Republican	Thomas W. Druce	Resigned	Reform	Robert J. Contino	282	1.0
145	Republican	Paul Clymer	Re-elected	Republican	Paul Clymer	17,368	100.0
146	Republican	Mary Ann Dailey	Re-elected	Republican	Mary Ann Dailey	12,766	55.4
146	Republican	Mary Ann Dailey	Re-elected	Democratic	Eileen McCaul	9,368	40.7
146	Republican	Mary Ann Dailey	Re-elected	Libertarian	John Haley	901	3.9
147	Republican	Raymond Bunt, Jr.	Re-elected	Republican	Raymond Bunt, Jr.	20,234	100.0
148	Republican	Lita Indzel Cohen	Re-elected	Republican	Lita Indzel Cohen	19,683	100.0
149	Democratic	Constance H. Williams	Re-elected	Democratic	Constance H. Williams	18,131	62.2
149	Democratic	Constance H. Williams	Re-elected	Republican	Lynne Kessler Lechter	11,038	37.8
150	Republican	John A. Lawless	Re-elected	Republican	John A. Lawless	17987	100.0
151	Republican	Eugene F. McGill	Re-elected	Republican	Eugene F. Mcgill	15,844	56.3
151	Republican	Eugene F. McGill	Re-elected	Democratic	Jules J. Mermelstein	12,284	43.7
152	Republican	Roy W. Cornell	Re-elected	Republican	Roy W. Cornell	16,859	100.0
153	Republican	Ellen M. Bard	Re-elected	Republican	Ellen M. Bard	16,739	61.6
153	Republican	Ellen M. Bard	Re-elected	Democratic	Larry Pfeiffer	10,033	36.9
153	Republican	Ellen M. Bard	Re-elected	Libertarian	Larry W. Goulart	401	1.5
154	Democratic	Lawrence H. Curry	Re-elected	Democratic	Lawrence H. Curry	21,878	74.0
154	Democratic	Lawrence H. Curry	Re-elected	Republican	Michael Whisted	7,698	26.0
155	Republican	Curt Schroder	Re-elected	Republican	Curt Schroder	23,643	100.0
156	Republican	Elinor Z. Taylor	Re-elected	Republican	Elinor Z. Taylor	17,462	60.4
156	Republican	Elinor Z. Taylor	Re-elected	Democratic	A. Wayne Burton	11,470	39.6
157	Republican	Carole A. Rubley	Re-elected	Republican	Carole A. Rubley	22,706	100.0
158	Republican	L. Chris Ross	Re-elected	Republican	L. Chris Ross	20,519	67.8
158	Republican	L. Chris Ross	Re-elected	Democratic	Sherrill Franklin	8,167	27.0
158	Republican	L. Chris Ross	Re-elected	Libertarian	Kenneth A. Evans	1,588	5.2
159	Democratic	Thaddeus Kirkland	Re-elected	Democratic	Thaddeus Kirkland	9,549	64.0
159	Democratic	Thaddeus Kirkland	Re-elected	Republican	Lavada E.Y. Driggins	5,378	36.0
160	Republican	Stephen Barrar	Re-elected	Republican	Stephen Barrar	19,286	66.1
160	Republican	Stephen Barrar	Re-elected	Democratic	Mary Ellen McLaughlin	9,907	33.9
161	Republican	Tom Gannon	Re-elected	Republican	Tom Gannon	15,923	95.3
161	Republican	Tom Gannon	Re-elected	Libertarian	Barton B. Smith	792	4.7
162	Republican	Ron Raymond	Re-elected	Republican	Ron Raymond	13,206	64.1
162	Republican	Ron Raymond	Re-elected	Democratic	Jim Farrow	7,392	35.9
163	Republican	Nicholas A. Micozzie	Re-elected	Republican	Nicholas A. Micozzie	15,485	64.1
163	Republican	Nicholas A. Micozzie	Re-elected	Democratic	Bertha A. Phillips	8,667	35.9
164	Republican	Mario J. Civera, Jr.	Re-elected	Republican	Mario J. Civera, Jr.	13,780	62.8
164	Republican	Mario J. Civera, Jr.	Re-elected	Democratic	Alfred Achtert, Jr.	8,151	37.2
165	Republican	William F. Adolph, Jr.	Re-elected	Republican	William F. Adolph, Jr.	19,883	66.4
165	Republican	William F. Adolph, Jr.	Re-elected	Democratic	Chris Ricciuti	10,060	33.6
166	Democratic	Greg Vitali	Re-elected	Democratic	Greg Vitali	20,361	69.3
166	Democratic	Greg Vitali	Re-elected	Republican	Carolyn H. Parker	9,010	30.7
167	Republican	Robert J. Flick	Re-elected	Republican	Robert J. Flick	20,282	66.7
167	Republican	Robert J. Flick	Re-elected	Democratic	Michelle Cohen	10,113	33.3
168	Republican	Matthew J. Ryan	Re-elected	Republican	Matthew J. Ryan	20,506	66.8
168	Republican	Matthew J. Ryan	Re-elected	Democratic	Wilma Hutcheson-Williams	10,205	33.2
169	Republican	Dennis M. O'Brien	Re-elected	Republican	Dennis M. O'Brien	14,257	100.0
170	Republican	George T. Kenney, Jr.	Re-elected	Republican	George T. Kenney, Jr.	12,136	53.7
170	Republican	George T. Kenney, Jr.	Re-elected	Democratic	Jacques Lurie	10,456	46.3
171	Republican	Kerry A. Benninghoff	Re-elected	Republican	Kerry A. Benninghoff	19,643	92.8
171	Republican	Kerry A. Benninghoff	Re-elected	Libertarian	Kathleen L. Stroh	1,515	7.2
172	Republican	John M. Perzel	Re-elected	Republican	John M. Perzel	12,621	50.2
172	Republican	John M. Perzel	Re-elected	Democratic	Mark J. Chilutti	12,529	49.8
173	Democratic	Michael P. McGeehan	Re-elected	Democratic	Michael P. McGeehan	15,024	80.7
173	Democratic	Michael P. McGeehan	Re-elected	Republican	Daniel Sansoni	3,604	19.3
174	Democratic	Alan L. Butkovitz	Re-elected	Democratic	Alan L. Butkovitz	17,019	100.0
175	Democratic	Marie Lederer	Re-elected	Democratic	Marie Lederer	13,456	73.2
175	Democratic	Marie Lederer	Re-elected	Republican	Timothy Collins	4,919	26.8
176	Republican	Christopher R. Wogan	Re-elected	Republican	Christopher R. Wogan	12,948	100.0
177	Republican	John J. Taylor	Re-elected	Republican	John J. Taylor	9,122	56.2
177	Republican	John J. Taylor	Re-elected	Democratic	Marnie M. Aument-Loughrey	7,111	43.8
178	Republican	Roy Reinard	Re-elected	Republican	Roy Reinard	16,424	55.7
178	Republican	Roy Reinard	Re-elected	Democratic	Carl Cherkin	12,429	42.2
178	Republican	Roy Reinard	Re-elected	Reform	Jay Russell	621	2.1
179	Democratic	William W. Rieger	Re-elected	Democratic	William W. Rieger	11,545	100.0
180	Democratic	Benjamin Ramos	defeated in the primary	Democratic	Angel Cruz	11,321	89.1
180	Democratic	Benjamin Ramos	defeated in the primary	Republican	Ellen Maenner	1,384	10.9
181	Democratic	W. Curtis Thomas	Re-elected	Democratic	W. Curtis Thomas	16,344	100.0
182	Democratic	Babette Josephs	Re-elected	Democratic	Babette Josephs	20,519	95.2
182	Democratic	Babette Josephs	Re-elected	Libertarian	Richard O. Schwarz	1,035	4.8
183	Republican	Julie Harhart	Re-elected	Republican	Julie Harhart	15,258	67.6
183	Republican	Julie Harhart	Re-elected	Democratic	Frank W. Yandrisevits	7,297	32.4
184	Democratic	William F. Keller	Re-elected	Democratic	William F. Keller	15,083	100.0
185	Democratic	Robert C. Donatucci	Re-elected	Democratic	Robert C. Donatucci	14,854	80.5
185	Democratic	Robert C. Donatucci	Re-elected	Republican	Anthony Donoflio, Jr.	3,604	19.5
186	Democratic	Harold James	Re-elected	Democratic	Harold James	17,620	91.3
186	Democratic	Harold James	Re-elected	Republican	Walter Prusacki	1,676	8.7
187	Republican	Paul W. Semmel	Re-elected	Republican	Paul W. Semmel	18,893	100.0
188	Democratic	James R. Roebuck, Jr.	Re-elected	Democratic	James R. Roebuck, Jr.	16,416	100.0
189	Democratic	Joseph W. Battisto	defeated	Republican	Kelly Lewis	13,299	51.4
189	Democratic	Joseph W. Battisto	defeated	Democratic	Joseph W. Battisto	12,592	48.6
190	Democratic	Mike Horsey	Re-elected	Democratic	Mike Horsey	16,080	94.2
190	Democratic	Mike Horsey	Re-elected	Republican	Ronda M. Ford	988	5.8
191	Democratic	Ronald G. Waters	Re-elected	Democratic	Ronald G. Waters	17,363	100.0
192	Democratic	Louise Williams Bishop	Re-elected	Democratic	Louise Bishop	21,128	100.0
193	Republican	Steven Nickol	Re-elected	Republican	Steven Nickol	17,522	100.0
194	Democratic	Kathy Manderino	Re-elected	Democratic	Kathy Manderino	17,987	100.0
195	Democratic	Frank L. Oliver	Re-elected	Democratic	Frank L. Oliver	17,167	100.0
196	Republican	Todd Russell Platts	Elected to Congress	Republican	Beverly Mackereth	16,672	64.4
196	Republican	Todd Russell Platts	Elected to Congress	Democratic	Don Hake	8,133	31.4
196	Republican	Todd Russell Platts	Elected to Congress	Constitution	Roy C. Jones	1,101	4.3
197	Democratic	Andrew J. Carn	defeated in primary	Democratic	Jewell Williams	18,885	97.5
197	Democratic	Andrew J. Carn	defeated in primary	Independent	Tyray Miller	491	2.5
198	Democratic	Rosita C. Youngblood	Re-elected	Democratic	Rosita C. Youngblood	19,251	86.8
198	Democratic	Rosita C. Youngblood	Re-elected	Republican	Susan E. Segal	2,932	13.2
199	Republican	Albert H. Masland	Retired	Republican	Will Gabig	14,780	63.0
199	Republican	Albert H. Masland	Retired	Democratic	Margaret Tricarico	8,664	37.0
200	Democratic	LeAnna Washington	Re-elected	Democratic	Leanna Washington	21,856	83.6
200	Democratic	LeAnna Washington	Re-elected	Republican	D. Dexter Watson	4,273	16.4
201	Democratic	John L. Myers	Re-elected	Democratic	John L. Myers	19,518	97.2
201	Democratic	John L. Myers	Re-elected	Republican	Joseph L. Messa	568	2.8
202	Democratic	Mark B. Cohen	Re-elected	Democratic	Mark B. Cohen	15,386	100.0
203	Democratic	Dwight E. Evans	Re-elected	Democratic	Dwight E. Evans	20,097	100.0

== Sources ==
- Cox, Harold (November 3, 2004). "Pennsylvania House of Representatives - 1999-2000" (PDF). Wilkes University Election Statistics Project. Wilkes University.
- "2000 General Primary - Representative in the General Assembly". Commonwealth of PA - Elections Information. Wilkes University Election Statistics Project. Pennsylvania Department of State. 2004. Archived from the original on June 26, 2008.
- "2000 General Election - Representative in the General Assembly". Commonwealth of PA - Elections Information. Wilkes University Election Statistics Project. Pennsylvania Department of State. 2004. Archived from the original on November 27, 2008.
