= Belardi =

Belardi is an Italian surname. Notable people with the surname include:

- Adone Belardi (born 1950), Venezuelan jockey
- Antonio Belardi (born 1947), Venezuelan horse trainer
- Emanuele Belardi (born 1977), Italian footballer
- Fred Belardi (born 1942), American politician
- Wayne Belardi (1930–1993), American baseball player

== See also ==
- Belardi Auto Racing, an American racing team
