= 1996 Pennsylvania Senate election =

- November 5, 1996

All odd-numbered seats in the Pennsylvania State Senate 26 seats needed for a majority

| | Majority party | Minority party |
|---|---|---|
| Leader | Robert Jubelirer | Bob Mellow |
| Party | Republican | Democratic |
| Leader since | March 15, 1994 | January 3, 1989 |
| Leader's seat | 30th | 22nd |
| Last election | 29 | 21 |
| Seats won | 15 | 10 |
| Seats after | 30 | 20 |
| Seat change | ▲1 | ▼1 |
| Popular vote | 1,102,937 | 982,343 |
| Percentage | 52.62% | 46.87% |
- Democratic hold Republican hold Republican gain No election Republican: 50–60% 60–70% >90% Democratic: 50–60% 60–70% 70–80% 80–90% >90%
President Pro Tempore before election
Robert Jubelirer
Republican
Elected President Pro Tempore
Robert Jubelirer
Republican

The 1996 elections for the Pennsylvania State Senate were held on November 5, with 25 of 50 districts being contested. Primary elections were held on April 23, 1996. The term of office for those elected in 1996 began when the Senate convened in January 1997. Pennsylvania State Senators are elected for four-year terms, with half of the seats up for election every two years. The election coincided with the 1996 United States presidential election, United States House of Representatives elections and the election of the entirety of the Pennsylvania House of Representatives.

Republicans had controlled the chamber since the 1994 election.

== Results summary ==
=== Retiring incumbents ===
==== Democrats ====
1. District 35: William J. Stewart retired.

==== Republicans ====
1. District 19: Earl M. Baker retired.
2. District 21: Tim Shaffer retired.
3. District 25: John Peterson retired to run for Congress.
4. District 37: Mike Fisher retired to run for Attorney General.

=== Incumbents defeated in primary ===
==== Democrats ====
1. District 39: Eugene Porterfield lost renomination to Allen Kukovich.

== Primary elections ==
=== Democratic primary ===
1996 Pennsylvania Senate elections Democratic primary
| District | Candidates | Votes | Percent |
|---|---|---|---|
| 1 | Vince Fumo | 16,945 | 100.00 |
| 3 | Roxanne Jones | 17,954 | 100.00 |
| 5 | Tom Mills | 6,367 | 100.00 |
| 7 | Vincent Hughes | 17,218 | 100.00 |
| 9 | Robert L. Felker | 3,637 | 100.00 |
| 11 | Michael O'Pake | 9,717 | 100.00 |
| 13 | Bill Saylor | 4,789 | 100.00 |
| 15 | D. Ann Smilek | 7,147 | 100.00 |
| 17 | Dave Romine | 5,606 | 100.00 |
| 19 | Sara R. Nichols | 4,321 | 100.00 |
| 21 | Robert Thomas | 7,840 | 52.86 |
| 21 | Larry M. Kriess | 6,993 | 47.14 |
| 23 | No candidate filed for party. | | |
| 25 | Curt Bowley | 6,175 | 45.77 |
| 25 | Lugene Inzana | 5,166 | 38.30 |
| 25 | Ronald Lee Bills Sr. | 2,149 | 15.93 |
| 27 | No candidate filed for party. | | |
| 29 | No candidate filed for party. | | |
| 31 | James Hoefler | 6,364 | 100.00 |
| 33 | No candidate filed for party. | | |
| 35 | John N. Wozniak | 12,575 | 41.15 |
| 35 | P. J. Stevens | 11,833 | 38.72 |
| 35 | Daniel Kane | 4,244 | 13.89 |
| 35 | Linda Jo Berkey | 1,906 | 6.24 |
| 37 | Gregory Fajt | 19,143 | 100.00 |
| 39 | Allen Kukovich | 17,492 | 55.30 |
| 39 | Eugene Porterfield | 14,139 | 44.70 |
| 41 | Patrick J. Stapleton Jr. | 15,324 | 100.00 |
| 43 | Jay Costa | 17,632 | 57.77 |
| 43 | Rich Talarico | 6,694 | 21.93 |
| 43 | Steve Luncinski | 3,563 | 11.67 |
| 43 | George John Tkach | 2,632 | 8.62 |
| 45 | Albert Belan | 24,043 | 100.00 |
| 47 | Gerald LaValle | 23,898 | 100.00 |
| 49 | Anthony Andrezeski | 15,604 | 100.00 |

=== Republican primary ===
1996 Pennsylvania Senate elections Republican primary
| District | Candidates | Votes | Percent |
|---|---|---|---|
| 1 | Ron A. Reilly | 2,800 | 100.00 |
| 3 | Michael G. Floyd | 1,493 | 100.00 |
| 5 | Frank A. Salvatore | 7,843 | 100.00 |
| 7 | Edward P. Bevans | 1,590 | 100.00 |
| 9 | Clarence D. Bell | 23,101 | 100.00 |
| 11 | Scott C. Carbon | 6,518 | 100.00 |
| 13 | Gibson E. Armstrong | 15,059 | 100.00 |
| 15 | Jeffrey Piccola | 17,202 | 100.00 |
| 17 | Richard Tilghman | 16,439 | 100.00 |
| 19 | Robert J. Thompson | 19,721 | 100.00 |
| 21 | Mary Jo White | 6,055 | 25.63 |
| 21 | John R. McMillin Jr. | 5,575 | 23.60 |
| 21 | Robert Kasenter | 5,019 | 21.25 |
| 21 | Mark D. Burd | 2,822 | 11.95 |
| 21 | Brian D. Knapp | 2,608 | 11.04 |
| 21 | Jan K. Richardson | 1,545 | 6.54 |
| 23 | Roger A. Madigan | 16,566 | 100.00 |
| 25 | Bill Slocum | 8,028 | 32.25 |
| 25 | Joe Scarnati | 7,677 | 30.84 |
| 25 | Ron Orris | 5,273 | 21.18 |
| 25 | Michael A. Aiello | 3,918 | 15.74 |
| 27 | Edward Helfrick | 12,064 | 100.00 |
| 29 | James J. Rhoades | 14,322 | 100.00 |
| 31 | Harold Mowery | 17,442 | 100.00 |
| 33 | Terry L. Punt | 14,336 | 100.00 |
| 35 | Samuel F. Rizzo | 11,255 | 100.00 |
| 37 | Tim Murphy | 11,402 | 69.89 |
| 37 | John Schnatterly | 4,912 | 30.11 |
| 39 | Charles H. Frederickson | 8,834 | 100.00 |
| 41 | George R. Kepple | 12,903 | 100.00 |
| 43 | Kathy Matta | 6,041 | 100.00 |
| 45 | Dick Reid | 7,586 | 100.00 |
| 47 | No candidate filed for party. | | |
| 49 | Jane Earll | 12,031 | 100.00 |

== General election ==
=== Overview ===
Statewide outlook
| Affiliation | Candidates | Votes | % | Seats before | Seats up | Seats won | Seats after |
|---|---|---|---|---|---|---|---|
| Republican | 24 | 1,102,937 | 52.62 | 29 | 14 | 15 (▲1) | 30 |
| Democratic | 21 | 982,343 | 46.87 | 21 | 11 | 10 (▼1) | 20 |
| Write-in | - | 6,484 | 0.31 | - | - | - | - |
| Libertarian | 1 | 4,162 | 0.20 | 0 | 0 | 0 | 0 |
| Total | 46 | 2,095,926 | 100.00 | 50 | 25 | 25 | 50 |

=== Close races ===
Five district races had winning margins of less than 15%:

| District | Winner | Margin |
|---|---|---|
| District 41 | Democratic | 6.5% |
| District 49 | Republican (flip) | 10.7% |
| District 37 | Republican | 10.7% |
| District 13 | Republican | 13.1% |
| District 25 | Republican | 14.2% |

=== District breakdown ===
| District | Party | Incumbent | Status | Party | Candidate | Votes | % |
|---|---|---|---|---|---|---|---|
| 1 | Democratic | Vince Fumo | Re-elected | Democratic | Vince Fumo | 57,267 | 78.65 |
| 1 | Democratic | Vince Fumo | Re-elected | Republican | Ron A. Reilly | 15,542 | 21.35 |
| 3 | Democratic | Roxanne Jones | Died (Note: Jones died on May 19, 1996, after winning the primary. Shirley Kitchen was chosen as the Democratic nominee.) | Democratic | Shirley Kitchen | 58,218 | 88.01 |
| 3 | Democratic | Roxanne Jones | Died | Republican | Michael G. Floyd | 7,934 | 11.99 |
| 5 | Republican | Frank A. Salvatore | Re-elected | Republican | Frank A. Salvatore | 46,575 | 59.27 |
| 5 | Republican | Frank A. Salvatore | Re-elected | Democratic | Tom Mills | 32,011 | 40.73 |
| 7 | Democratic | Vincent Hughes | Re-elected | Democratic | Vincent Hughes | 64,846 | 89.04 |
| 7 | Democratic | Vincent Hughes | Re-elected | Republican | Edward P. Bevans | 7,980 | 10.96 |
| 9 | Republican | Clarence D. Bell | Re-elected | Republican | Clarence D. Bell | 59,882 | 65.42 |
| 9 | Republican | Clarence D. Bell | Re-elected | Democratic | Robert L. Felker | 31,647 | 34.58 |
| 11 | Democratic | Michael O'Pake | Re-elected | Democratic | Michael O'Pake | 58,108 | 72.90 |
| 11 | Democratic | Michael O'Pake | Re-elected | Republican | Scott C. Carbon | 21,602 | 27.10 |
| 13 | Republican | Gibson E. Armstrong | Re-elected | Republican | Gibson E. Armstrong | 48,125 | 56.54 |
| 13 | Republican | Gibson E. Armstrong | Re-elected | Democratic | Bill Saylor | 36,987 | 43.46 |
| 15 | Republican | Jeffrey Piccola | Re-elected | Republican | Jeffrey Piccola | 60,100 | 66.96 |
| 15 | Republican | Jeffrey Piccola | Re-elected | Democratic | D. Ann Smilek | 29,660 | 33.04 |
| 17 | Republican | Richard Tilghman | Re-elected | Republican | Richard Tilghman | 59,823 | 58.75 |
| 17 | Republican | Richard Tilghman | Re-elected | Democratic | Dave Romine | 42,004 | 41.25 |
| 19 | Republican | Earl M. Baker | Retired | Republican | Robert J. Thompson | 60,122 | 62.70 |
| 19 | Republican | Earl M. Baker | Retired | Democratic | Thomas J. Bosak | 31,601 | 32.96 |
| 19 | Republican | Earl M. Baker | Retired | Libertarian | Thomas F. McGrady Jr. | 4,162 | 4.34 |
| 21 | Republican | Tim Shaffer | Retired | Republican | Mary Jo White | 51,532 | 60.04 |
| 21 | Republican | Tim Shaffer | Retired | Democratic | Robert Thomas | 34,303 | 39.96 |
| 23 | Republican | Roger A. Madigan | Re-elected | Republican | Roger A. Madigan | 62,044 | 100.00 |
| 25 | Republican | John Peterson | Retired to run for Congress | Republican | Bill Slocum | 46,804 | 57.11 |
| 25 | Republican | John Peterson | Retired to run for Congress | Democratic | Curt Bowley | 35,144 | 42.89 |
| 27 | Republican | Edward Helfrick | Re-elected | Republican | Edward Helfrick | 58,000 | 100.00 |
| 29 | Republican | James J. Rhoades | Re-elected | Republican | James J. Rhoades | 81,872 | 100.00 |
| 31 | Republican | Harold Mowery | Re-elected | Republican | Harold Mowery | 61,004 | 67.88 |
| 31 | Republican | Harold Mowery | Re-elected | Democratic | James M. Hoefler | 28,869 | 32.12 |
| 33 | Republican | Terry L. Punt | Re-elected | Republican | Terry L. Punt | 82,599 | 100.00 |
| 35 | Democratic | William J. Stewart | Retired | Democratic | John N. Wozniak | 59,505 | 70.54 |
| 35 | Democratic | William J. Stewart | Retired | Republican | Samuel F. Rizzo | 24,855 | 29.46 |
| 37 | Republican | Mike Fisher | Retired to run for Attorney General | Republican | Tim Murphy | 59,434 | 55.36 |
| 37 | Republican | Mike Fisher | Retired to run for Attorney General | Democratic | Gregory Fajt | 47,919 | 44.64 |
| 39 | Democratic | Eugene Porterfield | Defeated in primary | Democratic | Allen Kukovich | 51,071 | 60.96 |
| 39 | Democratic | Eugene Porterfield | Defeated in primary | Republican | Charles H. Frederickson | 32,704 | 39.04 |
| 41 | Democratic | Patrick J. Stapleton Jr. | Re-elected | Democratic | Patrick J. Stapleton Jr. | 43,439 | 53.25 |
| 41 | Democratic | Patrick J. Stapleton Jr. | Re-elected | Republican | George R. Kepple | 38,138 | 46.75 |
| 43 | Democratic | Jay Costa | Re-elected | Democratic | Jay Costa | 60,890 | 71.00 |
| 43 | Democratic | Jay Costa | Re-elected | Republican | Kathy Matta | 24,867 | 29.00 |
| 45 | Democratic | Albert Belan | Re-elected | Democratic | Albert Belan | 53,518 | 64.06 |
| 45 | Democratic | Albert Belan | Re-elected | Republican | Dick Reid | 30,032 | 35.94 |
| 47 | Democratic | Gerald LaValle | Re-elected | Democratic | Gerald LaValle | 83,905 | 100.00 |
| 49 | Democratic | Anthony Andrezeski | Defeated | Republican | Jane Earll | 51,367 | 55.35 |
| 49 | Democratic | Anthony Andrezeski | Defeated | Democratic | Anthony Andrezeski | 41,431 | 44.65 |

== See also ==
- Elections in Pennsylvania
- List of Pennsylvania state legislatures
