= Leonard Martino =

American politician (1925–2021)

Leonard L. Martino

Member of the Pennsylvania House of Representatives from the 21st district
- In office 1969–1974
- Preceded by: District created
- Succeeded by: Thomas E. Flaherty

Personal details
- Born: March 17, 1925 Butler, Pennsylvania
- Died: February 19, 2021 (aged 95) Oakmont, Pennsylvania
- Party: Democratic
- Spouse: Marion Mason (m. 1955)
- Education: Duquesne University; Georgetown University

Leonard L. Martino (March 17, 1925 – February 19, 2021) was an American politician who was a Democratic member of the Pennsylvania House of Representatives.

He was born in Butler to Michael and Angela Ditullio Martino.
