= Richard Frankenburg =

American politician

Richard J. Frankenburg

Member of the Pennsylvania House of Representatives from the 34th district
- In office 1971–1974
- Preceded by: Thomas M. Nolan
- Succeeded by: Ronald Cowell

Personal details
- Born: June 3, 1929 Pittsburgh, Pennsylvania, United States
- Died: September 15, 2015 Wilkinsburg, Pennsylvania
- Party: Republican

Richard James Frankenburg (June 3, 1929 – September 15, 2015) is a former Republican member of the Pennsylvania House of Representatives.

== Background ==
Born in Pittsburgh, Pennsylvania, on June 3, 1929, Frankenburg was a son of George and Ethel S. Frankenburg and the husband of Sue Anna (Ward) Frankenburg. A 1948 graduate of Wilkinsburg High School, he pursued studies with the Institute of Local Government at the University of Pittsburgh. From 1950 to 1960, he served with the United States Navy Reserves. Elected to the Wilkinsburg council in 1966, he served until 1970; he was then reelected to the council in 1977, and served until 1984.

A member of the Allegheny County Republican Committee from 1966 to 1972, he was also a member of the Young Republicans of Allegheny County. Elected to the Pennsylvania House of Representatives in 1970 and 1972, he was unsuccessful in reelection bids in 1974 and 1976.

Frankenburg died on September 15, 2015, in Wilkinsburg, Pennsylvania, and was interred at the Mount Royal Cemetery in the Allegheny County community of Glenshaw.
