= Elisabeth Bennington =

American politician (born 1976)

Member of the Pennsylvania House of Representatives from the 21st district
- In office January 2, 2007 – November 30, 2008
- Preceded by: Frank J. Pistella
- Succeeded by: Dom Costa

Personal details
- Born: January 20, 1976 (age 50) Pittsburgh, Pennsylvania
- Party: Democratic
- Spouse: Brad Korinski
- Education: Oxford University; Chatham College; Duquesne University
- Profession: Attorney
- Website: www.bennington-law.com

Elisabeth "Lisa" Bennington (born January 20, 1976) was a Democratic member of the Pennsylvania House of Representatives for the 21st District.

In 2006, she and fellow Democrat Chelsa Wagner became the second and third women elected to represent Pittsburgh in the Pennsylvania House. (Barbara Burns was the first woman elected to represent Pittsburgh in the Pennsylvania House of Representatives. Wagner and Bennington were the first women elected to a full term.) While Wagner went on to a successful career in public service, Bennington quit in her first term, explaining that she was better suited for divorce law.

== Formative years and personal life ==
Born in Pittsburgh in 1976, Bennington is a daughter of Joseph Maroon, M.D., vice chair of the University of Pittsburgh School of Medicine's Department of Neurological Surgery, and Paula Helsel, a certified registered nurse anesthetist.

Awarded a drama scholarship to Chatham College (now Chatham University), Bennington earned her Bachelor's degree in psychology from that institution in 1997. She was the awarded a Juris Doctor degree by Duquesne University in 2000.

At the time of her election to the Pennsylvania House in 2006, Bennington was a resident of Pittsburgh's Morningside neighborhood.

== Career ==
Prior to her election to the Pennsylvania House, Bennington was an attorney who specialized in divorce and other family law cases in the Greater Pittsburgh region.

Bennington was elected to the Pennsylvania House of Representatives in 2006, during "an anti-incumbent sweep" of that legislative body, becoming one of the first two women to represent city of Pittsburgh in the Pennsylvania House. She stated that she hoped to help reduce the size of the Pennsylvania House to make it a more effective body, but chose to leave after just one term. When asked why she was retiring prior to the 2008 elections, she told newspaper reporters that she was frustrated by the slow pace of legislative deliberations and the lack of progress on key issues, including gun safety and a ban on smoking. During her tenure, she was unable to secure support for a law that would have required hospitals to inform rape victims about emergency contraception options, but was able to convince her fellow House members to approve legislation authorizing the creation a centralized, online resource where Pennsylvania residents would be able to locate information about all of the laws in the commonwealth moving forward.

Bennington subsequently returned to divorce law.
