= Thomas E. Flaherty =

American politician from Pennsylvania

Judge of the Allegheny County Court of Common Pleas
- Incumbent
- Assumed office January 2, 2006

Chairperson of the Allegheny County Democratic Party
- In office October 23, 2002 – March 31, 2005
- Preceded by: Leonard Bodack
- Succeeded by: Jean Milko

Pittsburgh City Controller
- In office January 2, 1984 – January 6, 2006
- Preceded by: John McGrady
- Succeeded by: Anthony Pokora (Acting)

Member of the Pittsburgh City Council^{[a]}
- In office January 7, 1980 – January 2, 1984
- Preceded by: James Bulls
- Succeeded by: Jack Wagner

Member of the Pennsylvania House of Representatives from the 21st district
- In office January 3, 1975 – November 30, 1978
- Preceded by: Leonard Martino
- Succeeded by: Frank Pistella

Personal details
- Born: June 18, 1950 (age 76) Pittsburgh, Pennsylvania
- Party: Democratic
- Education: Duquesne University
- a.All City Council seats were, at that time, allotted on an at-large basis.

Thomas E. Flaherty (born June 18, 1950) is a former Democratic member of the Pennsylvania House of Representatives. He currently a judge on the Allegheny County Court of Common Pleas, having won election to this position in 2005.
