= A. Joseph Valicenti =

American politician

Member of the Pennsylvania House of Representatives from the 35th district
- In office 1969–1978
- Preceded by: District created
- Succeeded by: Thomas Michlovic

Personal details
- Born: May 16, 1923 Braddock, Pennsylvania
- Died: January 10, 1995 (aged 71) North Versailles, Pennsylvania
- Party: Democratic

Americo Joseph Valicenti (May 16, 1923 – January 10, 1995) was a Democratic member of the Pennsylvania House of Representatives.
