= 1996 Pennsylvania Attorney General election =

- November 5, 1996
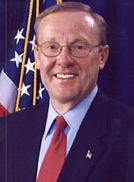

Nominee	Mike Fisher	Joe Kohn
Party	Republican	Democratic
Popular vote	2,083,850	2,016,026
Percentage	49.70%	48.08%
- Fisher: 40–50% 50–60% 60–70% 70–80% Kohn: 40–50% 50–60% 60–70% 70–80% 80–90% >90%
Attorney General before election
Tom Corbett
Republican
Elected Attorney General
Mike Fisher
Republican

The 1996 Pennsylvania Attorney General election was held on November 5, 1996, in order to elect the Attorney General of Pennsylvania. Republican nominee and member of the Pennsylvania Senate from the 37th district Mike Fisher defeated Democratic nominee Joe Kohn and Libertarian nominee Timothy William Collins.

== General election ==
On election day, November 5, 1996, Republican nominee Mike Fisher won the election by a margin of 67,824 votes against his foremost opponent Democratic nominee Joe Kohn, thereby retaining Republican control over the office of attorney general. Fisher was sworn in as the 43rd attorney general of Pennsylvania on January 21, 1997.

=== Results ===
Pennsylvania Attorney General election, 1996
Party	Candidate	Votes	%
Republican	Mike Fisher	2,083,850	49.70%
Democratic	Joe Kohn	2,016,026	48.08%
Libertarian	Timothy William Collins	93,125	2.22%
Total votes		4,193,001	100.00%
Republican hold			
