= Paul Costa (politician) =

American politician

Member of the Pennsylvania House of Representatives from the 34th district
- In office January 5, 1999 – January 1, 2019
- Preceded by: Ronald R. Cowell
- Succeeded by: Summer Lee

Personal details
- Born: October 11, 1959 (age 66) Pittsburgh, Pennsylvania, U.S.
- Party: Democratic
- Spouse: Kathleen Gallant Costa
- Relatives: Jay Costa Jr. (brother); Dom Costa (cousin)
- Education: Community College of Allegheny County (AGS); Point Park College (BS)

Paul Costa (born October 11, 1959) is an American accountant and politician who served as a member of the Pennsylvania House of Representatives representing the 34th District from 1999 to 2018. He was defeated in the 2018 Democratic primary by progressive challenger Summer Lee.

== Early life and education ==
Costa was born on October 11, 1959 to Jay Sr. (once Allegheny County treasurer) and Louise Costa. One of six children, he has a brother, Jay Jr., who is the state senator for the 43rd district.

He graduated from Taylor Allderdice High School in 1978 in the same class as Gary Graff and Maxine Lapiduss. He then studied at Community College of Allegheny County, where he obtained an Associate degree in 1988, and at Point Park College, earning a B.S. in Accounting in 1994.

== Career ==
He served on the Wilkins Township board of commissioners for three years, including one year as board president, and worked in the Allegheny County prothonotary's office for over two decades. Vice-chairman of the Wilkins Township Democratic Committee since 1992, Costa served as an alternate delegate to that year's Democratic National Convention, which nominated Bill Clinton. He is also a member of the parish council of St. Colman Catholic Church in Turtle Creek.
