= Andrew McGraw =

American politician (1938–2017)

Andrew J. McGraw

Member of the Pennsylvania House of Representatives from the 44th district
- In office 1969–1976
- Preceded by: District created
- Succeeded by: Ronald Gamble

Member of the Pennsylvania House of Representatives from the Allegheny County district
- In office 1967–1968

Personal details
- Born: March 9, 1938 Sturgeon, Pennsylvania, U.S.
- Died: November 17, 2017 (aged 79)
- Party: Democratic

Andrew J. McGraw ( March 9, 1938 – November 17, 2017) was an American politician and Democratic member of the Pennsylvania House of Representatives.
