= Ronald Gamble =

American politician (1933–2022)

Member of the Pennsylvania House of Representatives from the 44th district
- In office 1977–1996
- Preceded by: Andrew McGraw
- Succeeded by: John Pippy

Personal details
- Born: January 2, 1933 Oakdale, Pennsylvania, U.S.
- Died: December 23, 2022 (aged 89) Bethel Park, Pennsylvania, U.S.
- Party: Democratic

Ronald Gamble (January 2, 1933 – December 23, 2022) was an American politician and Democratic member of the Pennsylvania House of Representatives.
