= Ronald Cowell =

American politician

Ronald R. Cowell

Member of the Pennsylvania House of Representatives from the 34th district
- In office 1975–1998
- Preceded by: Richard J. Frankenburg
- Succeeded by: Paul Costa

Personal details
- Born: December 14, 1946 (age 79) Philipsburg, Pennsylvania, United States
- Party: Democratic
- Spouse: Virginia (deceased 2013)
- Children: Richard, Robert (deceased 2002)
- Education: Pittsburgh Central Catholic High School; University of Pittsburgh; Widener Law School

Ronald Raymond Cowell (born December 14, 1946) is a former Democratic member of the Pennsylvania House of Representatives.
