= Pennsylvania House of Representatives, District 34 =

American legislative district

Pennsylvania's 34th State House of Representatives district
Representative
Abigail Salisbury; D–Swissvale
- Population (2022): 61,582

The 34th Pennsylvania House of Representatives District is located in southwest Pennsylvania and has been represented by Democrat Abigail Salisbury since 2023.

== District profile ==
The 34th Pennsylvania House of Representatives District is located in Allegheny County and includes the following areas:

- Braddock
- Braddock Hills
- Chalfant
- Churchill
- East Pittsburgh
- Edgewood
- Forest Hills
- North Braddock
- Pittsburgh (part)
  - Ward 13 (part)
    - Division 01
    - Division 08
    - Division 10
    - Division 13
    - Division 14
  - Ward 14 (part)
    - Division 12
    - Division 13
    - Division 14
    - Division 15
    - Division 16
    - Division 17
    - Division 18
- Rankin
- Swissvale
- Wilkins Township
- Wilkinsburg

== Representatives ==
Representative	Party	Years	District home	Note
Prior to 1969, seats were apportioned by county.
Thomas M. Nolan	Democrat	1969 – 1970	Turtle Creek	Resigned on November 30, 1970 after election to Pennsylvania State Senate
Richard J. Frankenburg	Republican	1971 – 1974		
Ronald R. Cowell	Democrat	1975 – 1998		
Paul Costa	Democrat	1999 – 2019		
Summer Lee	Democrat	2019 – 2022	Pittsburgh	Resigned on December 7, 2022 after election to U.S. House of Representatives
Abigail Salisbury	Democrat	2023 – present	Swissvale	Won special election February 7, 2023

== Recent election results ==
PA House election, 2024: Pennsylvania House, District 34
Party	Candidate	Votes	%
Democratic	Abigail Salisbury (incumbent)	Unopposed	
Total votes		30,209	100.00
Democratic hold			

PA House special election, 2023: Pennsylvania House, District 34
Party	Candidate	Votes	%
Democratic	Abigail Salisbury	10,282	87.90
Republican	Robert Pagane	1,416	12.10
Total votes		11,698	100.00
Democratic hold			

PA House election, 2022: Pennsylvania House, District 34
Party	Candidate	Votes	%
Democratic	Summer Lee (incumbent)	Unopposed	
Total votes		22,990	100.00
Democratic hold			

PA House election, 2020: Pennsylvania House, District 34
Party	Candidate	Votes	%
Democratic	Summer Lee (incumbent)	Unopposed	
Total votes		27,129	100.00
Democratic hold			

PA House election, 2018: Pennsylvania House, District 34
Party	Candidate	Votes	%
Democratic	Summer Lee	Unopposed	
Total votes		21,240	100.00
Democratic hold			

PA House election, 2016: Pennsylvania House, District 34
Party	Candidate	Votes	%
Democratic	Paul Costa (incumbent)	Unopposed	
Total votes		27,737	100.00
Democratic hold			

PA House election, 2014: Pennsylvania House, District 34
Party	Candidate	Votes	%
Democratic	Paul Costa (incumbent)	Unopposed	
Total votes		14,639	100.00
Democratic hold			

PA House election, 2012: Pennsylvania House, District 34
Party	Candidate	Votes	%
Democratic	Paul Costa (incumbent)	Unopposed	
Total votes		23,511	100.00
Democratic hold			

PA House election, 2010: Pennsylvania House, District 34
Party	Candidate	Votes	%
Democratic	Paul Costa (incumbent)	Unopposed	
Total votes		15,466	100.00
Democratic hold			
