= Frank Pistella =

American politician

Frank J. Pistella

Member of the Pennsylvania House of Representatives from the 21st district
- In office January 2, 1979 – November 30, 2006
- Preceded by: Thomas E. Flaherty
- Succeeded by: Elisabeth Bennington

Personal details
- Born: April 22, 1951 (age 75) Pittsburgh, Pennsylvania
- Died: June 20, 2025 Pittsburgh, Pennsylvania
- Party: Democratic
- Education: John Carroll University

Frank J. Pistella (April 22, 1951 - June 20, 2025) was a Democratic member of the Pennsylvania House of Representatives.

He was a 1969 graduate of Central District Catholic High School. He earned a degree in history from John Carroll University in 1973 and a certificate from the John F. Kennedy School of Government in 1985.
