= Roy Reinard =

American politician

Member of the Pennsylvania House of Representatives from the 178th district
- In office January 4, 1983 – November 30, 2002
- Preceded by: James M. McIntyre
- Succeeded by: Scott Petri

Personal details
- Born: November 23, 1954 (age 71) Philadelphia, Pennsylvania
- Party: Republican
- Spouse: Gail
- Education: West Chester University
- Occupation: Legislator-Insurance Agent

Roy Reinard is a former Republican member of the Pennsylvania House of Representatives.

He is a 1973 graduate of Council Rock High School in Newtown, Pennsylvania. He earned a degree from West Chester University in 1977. Prior to elective office, he worked in the insurance industry. He was first elected to represent the 178th legislative district in the Pennsylvania House of Representatives in 1982. He retired prior to the 2002 elections. He currently serves in the Pennsylvania Higher Education Assistance Agency.
