= Raymond Bunt =

Puerto Rican politician

Raymond Bunt, Jr.

Member of the Pennsylvania House of Representatives from the 147th district
- In office January 4, 1983 – November 30, 2006
- Preceded by: Marilyn S. Lewis
- Succeeded by: Bob Mensch

Personal details
- Born: May 19, 1944 (age 82) Aguadilla, Puerto Rico
- Party: Republican

Raymond Bunt, Jr. (born May 19, 1944) is a former Republican member of the Pennsylvania House of Representatives.

He is a 1962 graduate of Schwenksville High School in Schwenksville, Pennsylvania. He attended Ursinus College and Pennsylvania State University.

He was first elected to represent the 147th legislative district in the Pennsylvania House of Representatives in 1982. He retired prior to the 2006 elections.
