= Thomas Michlovic =

American politician

Thomas A. Michlovic

Member of the Pennsylvania House of Representatives from the 35th district
- In office January 2, 1979 – November 30, 2002
- Preceded by: A. Joseph Valicenti
- Succeeded by: Marc Gergely

Personal details
- Born: February 21, 1946 (age 80) Braddock, Pennsylvania
- Party: Democratic
- Spouse: Gwen Thomas
- Education: University of Pittsburgh

Military service
- Allegiance: United States
- Branch/service: U.S. Army
- Years of service: 1967-1969
- Battles/wars: Vietnam War

Thomas A. Michlovic (born February 21, 1946) is a former Democratic member of the Pennsylvania House of Representatives.

He is a 1964 graduate of St. Thomas High School in Braddock, Pennsylvania. He served in the United States Army in the Vietnam War from 1967–1968, where he was awarded the Purple Heart, the Combat Infantryman Badge, and the Vietnam Service Award. Upon his return, he earned two degree from the University of Pittsburgh, a degree in political science in 1972 and an M.P.A. in 1976.

He was first elected to represent the 35th legislative district in the Pennsylvania House of Representatives in 1978. During his tenure, he was received the Champion of Good Government Award from Common Cause in 1999 and the John Heinz Good Government Award from the Mon Valley Initiative in 2002. He retired prior to the 2002 election. On February 18, 2004, he was sworn in as a Commissioner of the Pennsylvania Securities Commission.
