= Pennsylvania House of Representatives, District 21 =

American legislative district

Pennsylvania's 21st State House of Representatives district
Representative
Lindsay Powell; D–Pittsburgh
- Population (2022): 62,076

The 21st Pennsylvania House of Representatives District is located in southwestern Pennsylvania and is represented by Lindsay Powell, who won a September 2023 special election to replace Sara Innamorato, who resigned in July 2023.

== District profile ==
The 21st District is located in Allegheny County and includes the following areas:

- Etna
- Millvale
- Pittsburgh (part)
  - Ward 02 (part)
    - Division 02
  - Ward 06
  - Ward 09
  - Ward 10 (part)
    - Division 01
    - Division 02
    - Division 03
    - Division 04
    - Division 05
    - Division 06
    - Division 07
    - Division 10
  - Ward 23 (part)
    - Division 01
    - Division 03
  - Ward 24
  - Ward 26 (part)
    - Division 09
    - Division 17
- Reserve Township
- Shaler Township

== Representatives ==
Representative	Party	Years	District home	Note
Prior to 1969, seats were apportioned by county.
Leonard L. Martino	Democrat	1969 – 1974		
Thomas E. Flaherty	Democrat	1975 – 1978		
Frank J. Pistella	Democrat	1979 – 2006		Defeated in primary
Lisa Bennington	Democrat	2007 – 2008	Pittsburgh	Retired
Dom Costa	Democrat	2009 – 2019	Pittsburgh	Defeated in primary
Sara Innamorato	Democrat	2019 – 2023	Pittsburgh	Resigned to run for Allegheny County Executive
Lindsay Powell	Democrat	2023 – present	Pittsburgh	Won special election September 19, 2023

== Recent election results ==
PA House election, 2024: Pennsylvania House, District 21
Party	Candidate	Votes	%
Democratic	Lindsay Powell (incumbent)	Unopposed	
Total votes		29,277	100.00
Democratic hold			

PA House special election, 2023: Pennsylvania House, District 21
Party	Candidate	Votes	%
Democratic	Lindsay Powell	7,318	65.54
Republican	Erin Connolly Autenreith	3,848	34.46
Total votes		11,166	100.00
Democratic hold			

PA House election, 2022: Pennsylvania House, District 21
Party	Candidate	Votes	%
Democratic	Sara Innamorato (incumbent)	20,255	63.58
Republican	Frank Perman	11,601	36.42
Total votes		31,856	100.00
Democratic hold			

PA House election, 2020: Pennsylvania House, District 21
Party	Candidate	Votes	%
Democratic	Sara Innamorato (incumbent)	24,057	66.38
Republican	John Waugh	12,183	33.62
Total votes		36,240	100.00
Democratic hold			

PA House election, 2018: Pennsylvania House, District 21
Party	Candidate	Votes	%
Democratic	Sara Innamorato	Unopposed	
Total votes		19,985	100.00
Democratic hold			

PA House election, 2016: Pennsylvania House, District 21
Party	Candidate	Votes	%
Democratic	Dom Costa (incumbent)	Unopposed	
Total votes		26,453	100.00
Democratic hold			

PA House election, 2014: Pennsylvania House, District 21
Party	Candidate	Votes	%
Democratic	Dom Costa (incumbent)	Unopposed	
Total votes		13,992	100.00
Democratic hold			

PA House election, 2012: Pennsylvania House, District 21
Party	Candidate	Votes	%
Democratic	Dom Costa (incumbent)	Unopposed	
Total votes		22,772	100.00
Democratic hold			

PA House election, 2010: Pennsylvania House, District 21
Party	Candidate	Votes	%
Democratic	Dom Costa (incumbent)	Unopposed	
Total votes		14,863	100.00
Democratic hold			
