= William Rieger =

American politician

- Rieger's official House portrait

Member of the Pennsylvania House of Representatives from the 179th district
- In office 1969 – November 30, 2006
- Preceded by: District created
- Succeeded by: Tony Payton

Member of the Pennsylvania House of Representatives from the Philadelphia County district
- In office 1967–1968

Personal details
- Born: November 2, 1922 Philadelphia, Pennsylvania, U.S.
- Died: December 11, 2009 (aged 87) Philadelphia, Pennsylvania, U.S.
- Party: Democratic
- Spouse: Lucy Yacovetti
- Occupation: Legislator

Military service
- Allegiance: United States
- Battles/wars: World War II

William W. Rieger (November 2, 1922 – December 11, 2009) was an American politician who served as a Democratic member of the Pennsylvania House of Representatives from 1967 to 2006.

== Background ==
Reiger was a 1941 graduate of Simon Gratz High School.

== Career ==
He was first elected to represent the 179th legislative district in 1966. During 40 year legislative career representing one of the state's poorest districts, he had only two bills passed into law (both in the 1970s). One dealt with loan calculations and another was about stop signs. His last measure to be enacted was a resolution declaring May 1983 to be "High Blood Pressure Month." The last bill he co-sponsored was in 1990. He served the Democratic party as chair of the board of directors of the 43rd Ward Democratic Executive Committee. He also served as co-chairman of the Philadelphia Legislative Delegation in the House.

He was criticized by his 1988 Democratic Primary opponent Benjamin Ramos for distributing campaign literature containing an "earthy Spanish term for excrement," which Rieger said was a printing mistake.

Rieger continued to hold his seat into his eighties, even as his health declined, leading to criticism that he was no longer able to serve effectively. In 2002, a PoliticsPA feature designating politicians with yearbook superlatives, he was named "Missing in Action." In 2003, he was criticized by The Philadelphia Inquirer for his legislative inactivity and his absence from his district; at the time of the report, he attended only two of the preceding 65 meetings of a committee on which he was the leading Democrat, and other members apparently registered his "presence" for him at the start of workdays when he was absent, preventing him from accumulating absences on the official record and allowing him to claim a per diem. When asked about his absenteeism, he pointed to his health, saying that he had battled prostate cancer and received a coronary stent in 2002. Regarding his legislative inactivity, he said, "I could introduce 100 bills tomorrow. They wouldn't go anywhere. They would all be lies. And I don't want to lie to the people," he said.

In 2004, Rieger was the subject of an ethics investigation after it was found that he had rigged his voting panel in the House chamber to hold down the "yes" button, allowing him to record affirmative votes on several measures while he was absent from the state capitol. He said that he had only done so because he needed to travel back home to retrieve medication; the votes in question were ultimately stricken, but he did not face any sanctions.

He retired prior to the 2006 elections.

== Death ==
Rieger died at Temple University Hospital on December 11, 2009, from a brain hemorrhage.
