= Gaynor Cawley =

American politician (1941–2021)

J. Gaynor Cawley
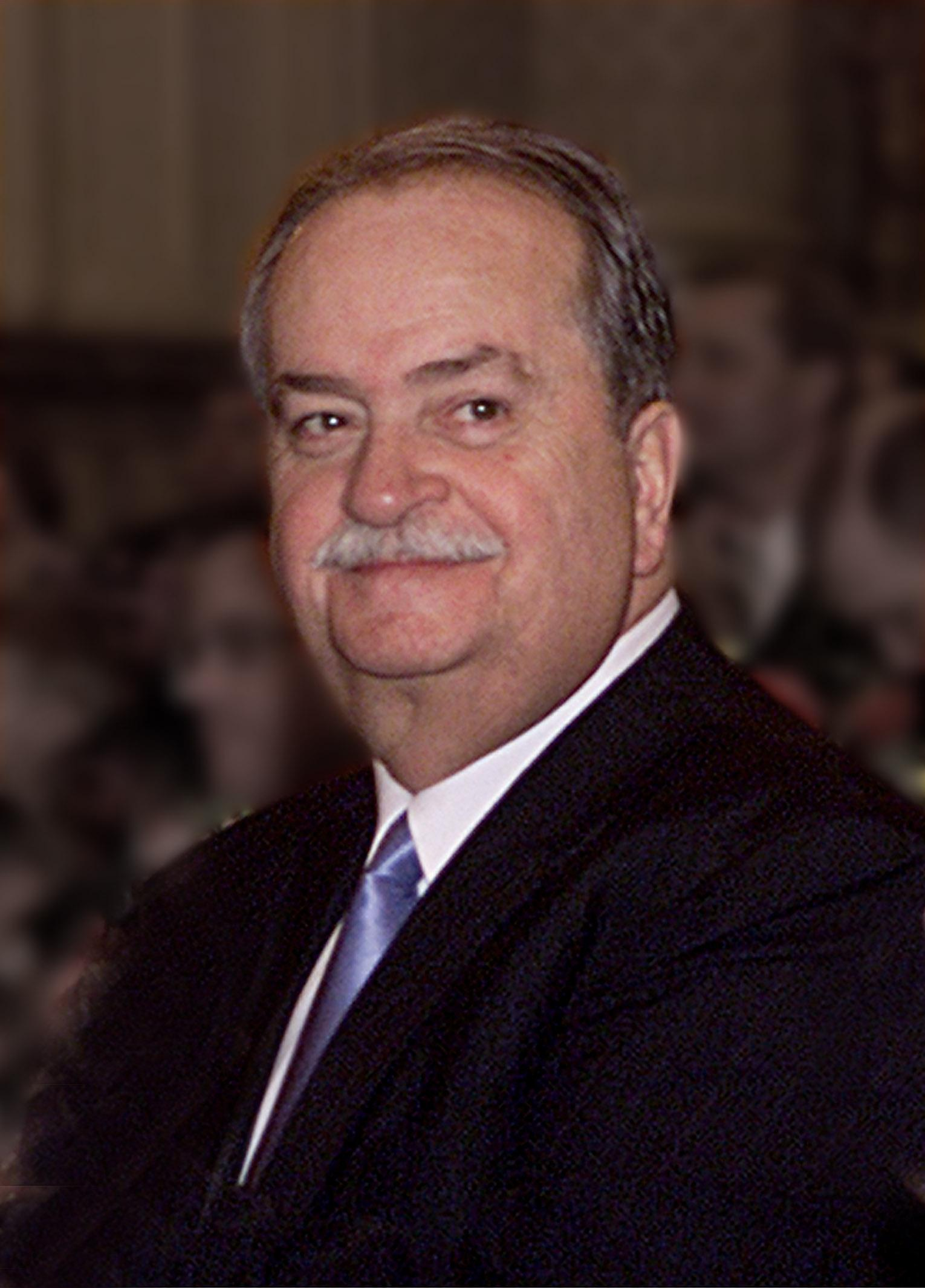
- J. Gaynor Cawley, Pennsylvania House Representative for the 113th legislative district.
- Born: June 19, 1941; Scranton, Pennsylvania
- Died: March 12, 2021 (aged 79); Scranton, Pennsylvania
- Occupations: Politician, Former professional baseball player
- Known for: Serving in the Pennsylvania House of Representatives
- Political party: Democratic
- Spouse: Kathryn 'Kathy' Karam
- Children: 5

J. Gaynor Cawley (June 19, 1941 – March 12, 2021) was an American politician and former professional baseball player. He served as a member of the Pennsylvania House of Representatives, representing the 113th legislative district, from 1980 until his retirement in 2006. Prior to his political career, Cawley played minor league baseball for the Detroit Tigers and the Houston Colt 45s.

== Early life and education ==
Cawley was born on June 19, 1941, in Scranton, Pennsylvania, to Joseph Gaynor Cawley and Margaret McHale. His father, a steelworker, was of Irish descent, and his mother was of Irish and Welsh descent. Cawley was raised in a Roman Catholic family in the Westside neighborhood of Scranton with his four siblings: Patrick, Sarah, Linda, and James.

He attended St. Patrick's High School in West Scranton and graduated in 1960. Cawley distinguished himself as an athlete, excelling in football as a quarterback, basketball, and baseball. In basketball, he scored over 1,000 points and achieved an impressive record as an all-star pitcher in baseball. He later enrolled at the University of Scranton, but left after two years to sign a professional baseball contract.

== Baseball career ==
Cawley's sports career began at the age of 7 when he joined the Rotary Team of the West Scranton Little League as a southpaw pitcher. He continued to excel in baseball throughout high school, winning 37 of 42 decisions and averaging over 2 strikeouts per inning. Additionally, he maintained a .330 batting average.

After leaving the University of Scranton, Cawley signed a professional baseball contract with the Detroit Tigers. He won 7 of 9 decisions during his rookie season in Georgia with the Tigers organization before being drafted by the Houston Colt 45s. Cawley played for Houston's Triple-A Oklahoma City team and later pitched for Modesto of the California League. He received an invitation to pitch with the Houston/Boston team in the Florida winter league before retiring from professional baseball in 1964.

== Political career ==
Cawley began his political career as the Deputy Mayor of Scranton, later being elected to the Pennsylvania House of Representatives in 1980 to represent the 113th Legislative District. He held this position for 13 consecutive terms. Prior to his tenure as a state representative, Cawley served the city of Scranton in various capacities, including as director of public works from 1978 to 1979, deputy mayor from 1977 to 1980, and director of community development in 1980.

Throughout his legislative career, Cawley was recognized for his bipartisanship approach to governance, emphasizing the importance of respectful communication and collaboration with colleagues from both political parties. He worked tirelessly to address the needs of his constituents, taking on challenging issues such as flooding and toxic waste. Cawley was instrumental in securing funding for flood mitigation projects and addressing water contamination issues in his district.

As a pragmatic politician, Cawley was involved in numerous legislative matters, including liability insurance, medical malpractice, and support for public schools. He acknowledged the slow progress on some issues, like the cleanup of a hazardous waste site in Throop, but emphasized persistence and problem-solving over complaints.

During his tenure in the Pennsylvania House of Representatives, Cawley served on several committees, including as Chairman of the Fish and Game Committee. He believed in fostering collaboration and communication among government officials to tackle challenges effectively, despite the potential for negative outcomes, such as bills being buried due to lobbying or personal agendas.

As a Democrat, Cawley focused on doing his job well, rather than promoting himself. He maintained friendships across party lines and was well-respected by his colleagues. Encouraged to run for office by a former colleague, Cawley won his first election and continued to work diligently to represent his constituents throughout his career. Despite the challenges, he considered it a privilege to serve the people he represented.

== Personal life ==
Cawley married his childhood sweetheart, Kathryn 'Kathy' Karam, and together they had five daughters: Lynn, Tara, Claudine, Jennifer, and Kate. The couple also had eight grandchildren.

A deeply faithful man, Cawley was a devoted member of St. Ann Maronite Church in West Scranton. He was known for his humility, honesty, and concern for others, as well as his dedication to helping the less fortunate. Additionally, Cawley was an ardent animal lover and advocate, often expressing his passion for animal welfare.

== Death ==
J. Gaynor Cawley succumbed to his battle with throat and lung cancer on March 12, 2021, at the age of 79. He died peacefully at home, surrounded by his family. He is survived by his wife, Kathy; their five daughters and eight grandchildren; three siblings, Patrick, James, and Sarellen; and numerous nieces, nephews, and cousins. His sister, Linda Conrad, preceded him in death.
