= Fred Belardi =

American politician

Member of the Pennsylvania House of Representatives from the 112th district
- In office January 2, 1979 – November 30, 2006
- Preceded by: William McLane
- Succeeded by: Kenneth J. Smith

Personal details
- Born: December 30, 1942 (age 83) Scranton, Pennsylvania
- Party: Democratic
- Spouse: Pamela
- Children: 2 children

Military service
- Allegiance: United States
- Branch/service: U.S. Naval Reserve
- Years of service: 1968 — 1971

Fred Belardi (born December 30, 1942) is a former Democratic member of the Pennsylvania House of Representatives.

Belardi attended Scranton Technical High School, Penn State Scranton, and Wilkes College.
