= 2002 Pennsylvania House of Representatives election =

- November 5, 2002

All 203 seats in the Pennsylvania House of Representatives 102 seats needed for a majority
	Majority party	Minority party
Leader	Matt Ryan	Bill DeWeese
Party	Republican	Democratic
Leader since	January 3, 1995	January 3, 1995
Leader's seat	168th District	50th District
Last election	104	99
Seats before	106	97
Seats after	110	93
Seat change	▲4	▼4
- Results: Democratic hold Democratic gain Republican hold Republican gain
Speaker before election
Matt Ryan
Republican
Elected Speaker
Matt Ryan
Republican

Elections for the Pennsylvania House of Representatives were held on November 5, 2002, with all districts being contested. State Representatives are elected for two-year terms, with the entire House of Representatives up for a vote every two years. The term of office for those elected in 2002 ran from January 7, 2003 until November 30, 2004. Necessary primary elections were held on May 21, 2002.

This was the first Pennsylvania House of Representatives election held after the constitutionally-mandated decennial reapportionment plan.

== Predictions ==
Source	Ranking	As of
The Cook; Political Report	Lean R	October 4, 2002

== Overview ==
Affiliation	Seats at Last Election	Seats at End of Legislative Session	Seats after Election	Change Since Last Election
Democratic	99	97	93	-6
Republican	104	106	110	+6

=== Notable elections ===
==== Special election for the 100th legislative district ====
A special election for the 100th legislative district was held on 2056, following the April resignation of Republican John Barley, who had been the third highest ranking Republican in the House and Chairman of the House Appropriations Committee. He had first announced his intention to retire in early 2002, only to change his mind in March when he unexpectedly showed up at a local party committee meeting, where he received the Republican Party endorsement.

==== Special election for the 2nd legislative district ====
A special election for the 2nd legislative district was held on August 14, 2001, following the May 2001 death of Italo Cappabianca. The local Democratic committee controversially endorsed Gayle Wright over Cappabianca's widow, Linda. Cappabianca decided against mounting a formal write-in campaign, citing time constraints, but encouraged voters to write her in as an independent candidate. Wright won the August 14 contest with 48.2% of the vote, with Cappabianca placing a strong second with 39.1%.

==== Special election for the 149th legislative district ====
A special election for the 149th legislative district was held on February 12, 2002, following the resignation of Democrat Constance H. Williams, who was elected to represent the 17th senatorial district in the Pennsylvania Senate. In that election, Republican Wallis Brooks narrowly defeated Democrat Daylin Leach. Brooks finished the remainder of Williams' term before losing a re-match to Daylin Leach in the 2002 general election.

==== Special election for the 176th legislative district ====
A special election for the 176th legislative district was held on April 23, 2002, following the resignation of Christopher Wogan, who was elected a judge of the Philadelphia County Court of Common Pleas in November 2001. Per the legislative redistricting plan enacted in 2001, the 176th district was moved from Philadelphia County to Monroe County. In that election, Republican Monroe County Commissioner Mario Scavello defeated Democrat Joseph Battisto, who had represented the nearby 189th legislative from 1983 until his defeat in 2000.

A special election for the 28th legislative district was held on June 26, 2001, following the resignation of Jane Orie, who was elected in March 2001 to represent the 40th senatorial district in the Pennsylvania Senate. Republican Mike Turzai, an attorney and former member of the Bradford Woods councilman, defeated Democrat Thomas Dancison by a 3–1 margin and captured every precinct in the reliably Republican suburban Pittsburgh district. This was the second election for Turzai, who unsuccessfully challenged Congressman Ron Klink in 1998.

== Primary elections ==
In the primary election held on May 21, 2002, four incumbent legislators (two Republicans and two Democrats) lost their party's nomination. In the 19th legislative district, Democratic incumbent William Russell Robinson was defeated by Jake Wheatley, a staffer for Pittsburgh City Councilman Sala Udin, a Robinson rival. The Robinson campaign was criticized for a weak effort, finishing the election with cash left over.

In the 2nd legislative district, Democratic Gayle Wright, who had been elected in a 2001 special election, lost to Florindo Fabrizio. In the 97th legislative district, Republican Jere Strittmatter lost a surprising upset to Manheim Township Supervisor Roy Baldwin. In the 98th legislative district, Republican Thomas E. Armstrong lost to Lancaster County Clerk of Courts David Hickernell.

=== Retirements ===
Four seats left open by Democratic retirements were kept by Democrats, with Vince Biancucci succeeding Nick Colafella, Marc J. Gergely succeeding Tom Michlovic, Nick Kotik succeeding Fred A. Trello, and Neal Goodman succeeding Edward J. Lucyk. Seven seats left open by Republican retirements were filled by other Republicans, with Scott W. Boyd succeeding Jere W. Schuler, Martin T. Causer succeeding Kenneth M. Jadlowiec, C. Adam Harris succeeding Daniel F. Clark, Mauree Gingrich succeeding Edward H. Krebs, Douglas G. Reichley succeeding Jane S. Baker, and Scott A. Petri succeeding Roy Reinard. Long-time Representative Frank Tulli retired shortly after winning the Republican nomination in the May primary. Fellow Republican John Payne took his place on the November ballot, winning easily.

Three Western Pennsylvania incumbent Democrats retired after their districts were moved to the eastern portion of the state during the decennial redistricting process. All three of these seats were captured by Republicans. Democrat David Mayernik had his district, the 29th legislative district, "diced" into seven other districts and moved across the state from Allegheny County to Bucks County, Pennsylvania. Democratic leaders were unhappy that he had crossed party lines and otherwise disobeying caucus leaders. This newly reconfigured seat was captured by Bernie O'Neill, a Bucks County Republican. Democrat Ralph Kaiser retired when the 41st legislative district was moved from Allegheny County to Lancaster County, which was retribution by the House Democratic caucus for his fiscally conservative voting pattern. The seat was taken by Katie True, who had previously represented the 37th legislative district, a seat she gave up in 2000 to run for Pennsylvania Auditor General. Democrat Leo Trich's Washington County-based district, the 47th legislative district, was moved to York County, where it was captured by Republican Keith J. Gillespie.

=== 62nd legislative district ===
In the 62nd legislative district, incumbent Democrat Sara Steelman was upset by Dave L. Reed, a 24-year-old Republican. Both candidates made improving the local economic climate part of their platforms. Steelman had become a GOP target after " alienating" some in her home district. As a challenger, Reed followed the campaign blueprint established in 2000 by when young Jeff Coleman defeated Tim Pesci in nearby Armstrong County. Reed raised $120,000 for the campaign and knocked on 11,000 doors in the district. During the campaign, Steelman "erupted" on the district's airwaves with taxpayer-funded "public service announcements" for the first time in a decade. With the 57-43 victory, Reed became the youngest member of the House.

=== 149th legislative district ===
In the 149th legislative district, Republican incumbent Wallis Brooks, who had been elected in February, lost to Democrat Daylin Leach in a rematch of their February special election. The Brooks campaign sent dozens of direct mail advertisements, including one accusing Leach of defending child molesters as an attorney. On the Saturday before the election, one was sent to voters accusing Leach, a practicing Orthodox Jew who lost family in the Holocaust, of being anti-Semitic. The mailer carried a bold headline of "Anti-Semitism, Neo-Nazism, Holocaust Denial. They are not 'a big joke.'" The incendiary charges stemmed from Leach's 1999 defense of an in absentia client from Texas who was sued in Allentown, Pennsylvania for comments allegedly made in an Internet chat room. Following the dismissal, the plaintiff took to the internet and posted diatribes denouncing Leach and the Texas man as anti-Semites that were unearthed by a Brooks researcher and used in the mailer. "She had to know I was Jewish, because it had come up in a debate. But since I have a non-Jewish surname, she apparently thought she could get away with this," Leach said. The campaign immediately convinced a local Jewish newspaper to denounce the mailer and reproduced the article on a flyer with a profile of Leach, emphasizing his Jewish roots and activism, on the reverse. By election day, 70 volunteers had hand-delivered the literature to most district households. Leach won the election by over 1,000 votes.

=== 150th legislative district ===
In the 150th legislative district, Republican-turned Democrat John A. Lawless was defeated by Republican Jacqueline Crahalla by 62 votes. Both candidates easily won their respective party's nomination in the primary election. The district was designed to be disadvantageous to Lawless, who had run afoul of the Republican Caucus leadership. In September, Lawless caused a controversy when he was pulled over for a minor traffic violation by a Lower Providence Township, Pennsylvania police officer. Lawless used vulgar language to berated the officer and threatened the police department with a loss of state funds. Following the loss, Lawless destroyed many constituent-related documents, rather than surrender them to Crahalla.

== General election ==
District	Party	Incumbent	Status	Party	Candidate	Votes	%
1	Democratic	Linda Bebko-Jones	re-elected	Democratic	Linda Bebko-Jones	8,895	72.7
1	Democratic	Linda Bebko-Jones	re-elected	Republican	Bill Stephany	3,343	27.3
2	Democratic	Gayle Wright	defeated in primary	Democratic	Florindo Fabrizio	10,911	100
3	Republican	Karl Boyes	re-elected	Republican	Karl Boyes	14,988	76.9
3	Republican	Karl Boyes	re-elected	Democratic	Donna M. Snyder	4,507	23.1
4	Democratic	Tom Scrimenti	re-elected	Democratic	Tom Scrimenti	10,627	63.6
4	Democratic	Tom Scrimenti	re-elected	Republican	Jerry Weinheimer	6,086	36.4
5	Republican	John R. Evans	re-elected	Republican	John R. Evans	12,288	100
6	Republican	Teresa Forcier	re-elected	Republican	Teresa Forcier	10,109	59.6
6	Republican	Teresa Forcier	re-elected	Democratic	Jean Jones	6,859	40.4
7	Democratic	Michael C. Gruitza	re-elected	Democratic	Michael C. Gruitza	11,341	100
8	Republican	Richard R. Stevenson	re-elected	Republican	Dick Stevenson	11,890	66.8
9	Democratic	Chris Sainato	re-elected	Democratic	Chris Sainato	16,278	100
10	Democratic	Frank LaGrotta	re-elected	Democratic	Frank LaGrotta	14,706	100
11	Democratic	Guy A. Travaglio	re-elected	Democratic	Guy A. Travaglio	9,439	51.7
11	Democratic	Guy A. Travaglio	re-elected	Republican	Brian Ellis	8,827	48.3
12	Republican	Daryl Metcalfe	re-elected	Republican	Daryl Metcalfe	12,772	66.9
12	Republican	Daryl Metcalfe	re-elected	Democratic	Linda Schoettker	6,306	33.1
13	Republican	Arthur D. Hershey	re-elected	Republican	Arthur D. Hershey	10,240	60.0
13	Republican	Arthur D. Hershey	re-elected	Democratic	Nancy L. Cox	6,835	40.0
14	Democratic	Mike Veon	re-elected	Democratic	Mike Veon	12,366	100
15	Democratic	Nick Colafella	retired	Democratic	Vince Biancucci	10,414	53.1
15	Democratic	Nick Colafella	retired	Republican	Charles A. Camp	9,203	46.9
16	Democratic	Susan Laughlin	re-elected	Democratic	Susan Laughlin	10,240	56.3
16	Democratic	Susan Laughlin	re-elected	Republican	Ron Eggert	7,947	43.7
17	Republican	Rod E. Wilt	re-elected	Republican	Rod E. Wilt	12,594	100
18	Republican	Gene DiGirolamo	re-elected	Republican	Gene DiGirolamo	11,769	65.9
18	Republican	Gene DiGirolamo	re-elected	Democratic	Scott F. Blacker	6,078	34.1
19	Democratic	William Russell Robinson	Defeated in primary	Democratic	Jake Wheatley	8,615	100
20	Democratic	Don Walko	re-elected	Democratic	Don Walko	10,823	65.8
20	Democratic	Don Walko	re-elected	Republican	Angelo Romano	5,176	31.5
20	Democratic	Don Walko	re-elected	Libertarian	Charles Stutler	442	2.7
21	Democratic	Frank J. Pistella	re-elected	Democratic	Frank J. Pistella	10,952	67.5
21	Democratic	Frank J. Pistella	re-elected	Republican	Mario J. DiBello	5,276	32.5
22	Democratic	Michael Diven	re-elected	Democratic	Michael Diven	12,548	70.2
22	Democratic	Michael Diven	re-elected	Republican	Glenn P. Nagy	5,321	29.8
23	Democratic	Dan B. Frankel	re-elected	Democratic	Dan B. Frankel	13,834	100
24	Democratic	Joseph Preston	re-elected	Democratic	Joseph Preston	10,994	86.1
24	Democratic	Joseph Preston	re-elected	Green	Duane R. Wright	17,79	13.9
25	Democratic	Joseph F. Markosek	re-elected	Democratic	Joseph F. Markosek	13,132	69.7
25	Democratic	Joseph F. Markosek	re-elected	Republican	Paul Fero	5,722	30.3
26	Republican	Tim Hennessey	re-elected	Republican	Tim Hennessey	11,442	68.4
26	Republican	Tim Hennessey	re-elected	Democratic	Brian A. Dudonis	5,294	31.6
27	Democratic	Thomas C. Petrone	re-elected	Democratic	Thomas C. Petrone	10,634	65.5
27	Democratic	Thomas C. Petrone	re-elected	Republican	Edward O'Donnell	5,603	34.5
28	Republican	Mike Turzai	re-elected	Republican	Mike Turzai	16,802	100
29	Democratic	Dave Mayernik	retired	Republican	Bernie O'Neill	12,666	57.3
29	Democratic	Dave Mayernik	retired	Democratic	Kevin Corrigan	9,438	42.7
30	Republican	Jeffrey E. Habay	re-elected	Republican	Jeffrey E. Habay	15,965	69.3
30	Republican	Jeffrey E. Habay	re-elected	Democratic	Bobbi Jo Wagner	7,070	30.7
31	Republican	David J. Steil	re-elected	Republican	David J. Steil	12,747	59.1
31	Republican	David J. Steil	re-elected	Democratic	Virginia Waters Schrader	8,811	40.9
32	Democratic	Anthony M. DeLuca	re-elected	Democratic	Anthony M. DeLuca	14,376	100
33	Democratic	Frank Dermody	re-elected	Democratic	Frank Dermody	11,233	64.7
33	Democratic	Frank Dermody	re-elected	Republican	James M. McDonough	6,131	35.3
34	Democratic	Paul Costa	re-elected	Democratic	Paul Costa	13,633	90.1
34	Democratic	Paul Costa	re-elected	Independent	Robert Clanagan	1,503	9.9
35	Democratic	Tom Michlovic	retired	Democratic	Marc J. Gergely	10,799	100
36	Democratic	Harry Readshaw	re-elected	Democratic	Harry Readshaw	13,218	100
37	Republican	Tom C. Creighton	re-elected	Republican	Thomas C. Creighton	13,559	100
38	Democratic	Kenneth W. Ruffing	re-elected	Democratic	Kenneth W. Ruffing	13,224	100
39	Democratic	David Levdansky	re-elected	Democratic	David Levdansky	11,007	58.8
39	Democratic	David Levdansky	re-elected	Republican	Monica A. Douglas	7,707	41.2
40	Republican	John A. Maher	re-elected	Republican	John A. Maher	16,515	100
41	Democratic	Ralph Kaiser	retired	Republican	Katie True	13,371	67.2
41	Democratic	Ralph Kaiser	retired	Democratic	Barbara S. Achtermann	6,532	32.8
42	Republican	Thomas L. Stevenson	re-elected	Republican	Thomas L. Stevenson	14,665	61.5
42	Republican	Thomas L. Stevenson	re-elected	Democratic	Mike Crossey	9,170	38.5
43	Republican	Jere W. Schuler	retired	Republican	Scott W. Boyd	13,474	100
44	Republican	John Pippy	re-elected	Republican	John Pippy	13,431	100
45	Democratic	Fred A. Trello	retired	Democratic	Nick Kotik	12,126	65.8
45	Democratic	Fred A. Trello	retired	Republican	Herb Ohliger	6299	34.2
46	Democratic	Victor John Lescovitz	re-elected	Democratic	Victor John Lescovitz	9,624	54.6
46	Democratic	Victor John Lescovitz	re-elected	Republican	Paul Snatchko	8,015	45.4
47	Democratic	Leo J. Trich	retired	Republican	Keith Gillespie	13,114	92.3
47	Democratic	Leo J. Trich	retired	Independent	Marlin D. Cutshall	1094	7.7
48	Democratic	Timothy J. Solobay	re-elected	Democratic	Timothy Joseph Solobay	11,433	64.5
48	Democratic	Timothy J. Solobay	re-elected	Republican	James S. Fal	6,060	34.2
48	Democratic	Timothy J. Solobay	re-elected	Independent	Demo Agoris	244	1.4
49	Democratic	Peter J. Daley	re-elected	Democratic	Peter J. Daley	12,891	100
50	Democratic	Bill DeWeese	re-elected	Democratic	Bill DeWeese	11,002	100
51	Democratic	Larry Roberts	re-elected	Democratic	Larry Roberts	7,994	63.0
51	Democratic	Larry Roberts	re-elected	Republican	Joe Sabatini	4,699	37.0
52	Democratic	James E. Shaner	re-elected	Democratic	James E. Shaner	9,820	100
53	Republican	Robert W. Godshall	re-elected	Republican	Robert W. Godshall	12,681	100
54	Democratic	John E. Pallone	re-elected	Democratic	John E. Pallone	11,004	100
55	Democratic	Joseph A. Petrarca	re-elected	Democratic	Joseph A. Petrarca	12,016	100
56	Democratic	James E. Casorio	re-elected	Democratic	James E. Casorio	11,794	61.7
56	Democratic	James E. Casorio	re-elected	Republican	Susanna Lisotto	7,318	38.3
57	Democratic	Thomas A. Tangretti	re-elected	Democratic	Thomas A. Tangretti	9,401	53.5
57	Democratic	Thomas A. Tangretti	re-elected	Republican	Brian F. Boyle	8,170	46.5
58	Democratic	R. Ted Harhai	re-elected	Democratic	R. Ted Harhai	12,297	100
59	Republican	Jess Stairs	re-elected	Republican	Jess Stairs	17,213	100
60	Republican	Jeff Coleman	re-elected	Republican	Jeff Coleman	16,327	100
61	Republican	Kate M. Harper	re-elected	Republican	Kate M. Harper	13,950	63.2
61	Republican	Kate M. Harper	re-elected	Democratic	Diana Oboler	8,109	36.8
62	Democratic	Sara G. Steelman	defeated	Republican	Dave Reed	9,637	56.8
62	Democratic	Sara G. Steelman	defeated	Democratic	Sara G. Steelman	7,316	43.2
63	Republican	Fred McIlhattan	re-elected	Republican	Fred McIlhattan	15,573	100
64	Republican	Scott E. Hutchinson	re-elected	Republican	Scott E. Hutchinson	11,110	68.3
64	Republican	Scott E. Hutchinson	re-elected	Democratic	Dennis C. Schuster	5,152	31.7
65	Republican	Jim Lynch	re-elected	Republican	Jim Lynch	8,642	53.0
65	Republican	Jim Lynch	re-elected	Democratic	Sheila Brooker	6,353	38.9
65	Republican	Jim Lynch	re-elected	Constitution	Alan R. Kiser	1,319	8.1
66	Republican	Sam Smith	re-elected	Republican	Sam Smith	11,761	73.2
66	Republican	Sam Smith	re-elected	Democratic	A. Anson Brosius	4,298	26.8
67	Republican	Kenneth M. Jadlowiec	retired	Republican	Martin T. Causer	11,019	100
68	Republican	Matthew E. Baker	re-elected	Republican	Matthew E. Baker	15,485	100
69	Republican	Bob Bastian	re-elected	Republican	Bob Bastian	12,714	70.8
69	Republican	Bob Bastian	re-elected	Democratic	Charles E. Stuby	5,242	29.2
70	Republican	John W. Fichter	re-elected	Republican	John W. Fichter	11,420	60.9
70	Republican	John W. Fichter	re-elected	Democratic	Netta Young Hughes	7,146	38.1
70	Republican	John W. Fichter	re-elected	Independent	Mike Howell	183	1.0
71	Democratic	Edward P. Wojnaroski	re-elected	Democratic	Edward P. Wojnaroski	11,033	56.9
71	Democratic	Edward P. Wojnaroski	re-elected	Republican	Mark Parker	8,349	43.1
72	Democratic	Tom Yewcic	re-elected	Democratic	Tom Yewcic	14,165	69.3
72	Democratic	Tom Yewcic	re-elected	Republican	William F. Telek	6,266	30.7
73	Democratic	Gary Haluska	re-elected	Democratic	Gary Haluska	11,128	66.4
73	Democratic	Gary Haluska	re-elected	Republican	Vince Golden	5,224	31.1
73	Democratic	Gary Haluska	re-elected	Libertarian	James D. Tinnick II	419	2.5
74	Democratic	Camille George	re-elected	Democratic	Camille George	11,414	68.3
74	Democratic	Camille George	re-elected	Republican	C.J. Spencer	5,307	31.7
75	Democratic	Dan A. Surra	re-elected	Democratic	Dan A. Surra	14,758	100
76	Democratic	Mike Hanna	re-elected	Democratic	Mike Hanna	9,981	69.0
76	Democratic	Mike Hanna	re-elected	Republican	John T. Krupa	4,485	31.0
77	Republican	Lynn Herman	re-elected	Republican	Lynn Herman	12,107	85.5
77	Republican	Lynn Herman	re-elected	Libertarian	Richard Zych	2,047	14.5
78	Republican	Dick L. Hess	re-elected	Republican	Dick L. Hess	13,706	77.5
78	Republican	Dick L. Hess	re-elected	Democratic	Penny McFadden	3,978	22.5
79	Republican	Richard A. Geist	re-elected	Republican	Richard A. Geist	14,434	100
80	Republican	Jerry A. Stern	re-elected	Republican	Jerry A. Stern	14,785	82.3
80	Republican	Jerry A. Stern	re-elected	Democratic	James E. Grazier	3,169	17.7
81	Republican	Larry O. Sather	re-elected	Republican	Larry O. Sather	13,819	100
82	Republican	Daniel F. Clark	retired	Republican	C. Adam Harris	10,477	62.2
82	Republican	Daniel F. Clark	retired	Democratic	Tom Spangler	6,372	37.8
83	Republican	Steven W. Cappelli	re-elected	Republican	Steven W. Cappelli	12,065	100
84	Republican	Brett Feese	re-elected	Republican	Brett Feese	13,073	100
85	Republican	Russ Fairchild	re-elected	Republican	Russ Fairchild	11,761	89.7
85	Republican	Russ Fairchild	re-elected	Green	Eric J. Prindle	1,348	10.3
86	Republican	Allan Egolf	re-elected	Republican	Allan Egolf	14,763	100
87	Republican	Patricia H. Vance	re-elected	Republican	Patricia H. Vance	17,278	77.9
87	Republican	Patricia H. Vance	re-elected	Democratic	Charles W. Quinnan	4,915	22.1
88	Republican	Jerry L. Nailor	re-elected	Republican	Jerry L. Nailor	16,014	77.5
88	Republican	Jerry L. Nailor	re-elected	Democratic	Chris Adams	4,653	22.5
89	Democratic	Jeffrey W. Coy	re-elected	Democratic	Jeffrey W. Coy	8,710	51.4
89	Democratic	Jeffrey W. Coy	re-elected	Republican	Chris Sheffield	8,223	48.6
90	Republican	Patrick E. Fleagle	re-elected	Republican	Patrick E. Fleagle	13,802	100
91	Republican	Stephen R. Maitland	re-elected	Republican	Stephen R. Maitland	11,946	74.5
91	Republican	Stephen R. Maitland	re-elected	Democratic	Mark D. Berg	4,083	25.5
92	Republican	Bruce Smith	re-elected	Republican	Bruce Smith	14,180	77.2
92	Republican	Bruce Smith	re-elected	Democratic	Laurence Ellsperman	4,182	22.8
93	Republican	Ron Miller	re-elected	Republican	Ron Miller	14,241	100
94	Republican	Stanley E. Saylor	re-elected	Republican	Stanley E. Saylor	12,543	100
95	Democratic	Stephen H. Stetler	re-elected	Democratic	Stephen H. Stetler	6,226	100.0
96	Democratic	Mike Sturla	re-elected	Democratic	Mike Sturla	5,836	61.2
96	Democratic	Mike Sturla	re-elected	Republican	Tony Allen	3,695	38.8
97	Republican	Jere L. Strittmatter	defeated in primary	Republican	Roy E. Baldwin	15,351	93.9
97	Republican	Jere L. Strittmatter	defeated in primary	Green	William Robert Hagen	997	6.1
98	Republican	Thomas E. Armstrong	defeated in primary	Republican	David S. Hickernell	11,437	71.4
98	Republican	Thomas E. Armstrong	defeated in primary	Democratic	Quinn R. Koller	3,856	24.1
98	Republican	Thomas E. Armstrong	defeated in primary	Constitution	Jeff Rhine	410	2.6
98	Republican	Thomas E. Armstrong	defeated in primary	Green	J. Terry Zeller	310	2.0
99	Republican	Leroy M. Zimmerman	re-elected	Republican	Leroy M. Zimmerman	10,854	78.0
99	Republican	Leroy M. Zimmerman	re-elected	Democratic	Bernadette C. Johnson	3,054	22.0
100	Republican	Gibson C. Armstrong	re-elected	Republican	Gibson C. Armstrong	10,112	74.3
100	Republican	Gibson C. Armstrong	re-elected	Democratic	Bruce Beardsley	3,307	24.3
100	Republican	Gibson C. Armstrong	re-elected	Constitution	Kenneth L. Dinger	184	1.4
101	Republican	Edward H. Krebs	retired	Republican	Mauree Gingrich	10,883	64.8
101	Republican	Edward H. Krebs	retired	Democratic	Noel Hubler	5,358	31.9
101	Republican	Edward H. Krebs	retired	Libertarian	Eric Alan Paul	320	1.9
101	Republican	Edward H. Krebs	retired	Green	Eric R. Wolfe	237	1.4
102	Republican	Peter J. Zug	re-elected	Republican	Peter J. Zug	13,886	76.2
102	Republican	Peter J. Zug	re-elected	Democratic	Dan Backenstose	3,965	21.8
102	Republican	Peter J. Zug	re-elected	Libertarian	Raymond S. Ondrusek	371	2.0
103	Democratic	Ron Buxton	re-elected	Democratic	Ron Buxton	7,866	61.0
103	Democratic	Ron Buxton	re-elected	Republican	Sherman C. Cunningham	4,711	36.5
103	Democratic	Ron Buxton	re-elected	Green	Jonathan L. Gallup	319	2.5
104	Republican	Mark S. McNaughton	re-elected	Republican	Mark S. McNaughton	12838	61.4
104	Republican	Mark S. McNaughton	re-elected	Democratic	Bruce J. Warshawsky	8070	38.6
105	Republican	Ron Marsico	re-elected	Republican	Ron Marsico	22,065	100
106	Republican	Frank Tulli	retired	Republican	John D. Payne	14,683	100
107	Democratic	Robert E. Belfanti	re-elected	Democratic	Robert Belfanti	10,195	58.9
107	Democratic	Robert E. Belfanti	re-elected	Republican	Mike Robatin	7102	41.1
108	Republican	Merle H. Phillips	re-elected	Republican	Merle H. Phillips	13,440	85.5
108	Republican	Merle H. Phillips	re-elected	Democratic	Douglas P. Mapes	2,288	14.5
109	Democratic	John R. Gordner	re-elected	Republican	John R. Gordner	12,137	78.4
109	Democratic	John R. Gordner	re-elected	Democratic	Gerald W. Powers	3,338	21.6
110	Republican	Tina Pickett	re-elected	Republican	Tina Pickett	13,918	100
111	Republican	Sandra J. Major	re-elected	Republican	Sandra J. Major	15,191	100
112	Democratic	Fred Belardi	re-elected	Democratic	Fred Belardi	12,096	100
113	Democratic	Gaynor Cawley	re-elected	Democratic	Gaynor Cawley	13,679	100
114	Democratic	Jim Wansacz	re-elected	Democratic	Jim Wansacz	12,816	66.8
114	Democratic	Jim Wansacz	re-elected	Republican	Daniel Naylor	6,259	32.6
114	Democratic	Jim Wansacz	re-elected	Reform	Leonard Skursky	125	0.7
115	Democratic	Edward G. Staback	re-elected	Democratic	Edward Staback	13,426	100
116	Democratic	Todd A. Eachus	re-elected	Democratic	Todd A. Eachus	9,734	100
117	Republican	George C. Hasay	re-elected	Republican	George C. Hasay	12,552	100
118	Democratic	Thomas M. Tigue	re-elected	Democratic	Thomas M. Tigue	10,584	100
119	Democratic	John T. Yudichak	re-elected	Democratic	John T. Yudichak	11,744	100
120	Democratic	Phyllis Mundy	re-elected	Democratic	Phyllis Mundy	11,297	65.2
120	Democratic	Phyllis Mundy	re-elected	Republican	Robb A. Henderson	6,036	34.8
121	Democratic	Kevin Blaum	re-elected	Democratic	Kevin Blaum	9,637	100
122	Democratic	Keith R. McCall	re-elected	Democratic	Keith McCall	11,547	100
123	Democratic	Edward J. Lucyk	retired	Democratic	Neal Goodman	10,488	51.5
123	Democratic	Edward J. Lucyk	retired	Republican	Clyde Champ Holman	9,860	48.5
124	Republican	David G. Argall	re-elected	Republican	David G. Argall	14,168	74.3
124	Republican	David G. Argall	re-elected	Democratic	Gregory Kurtz	4,901	25.7
125	Republican	Bob Allen	re-elected	Republican	Bob Allen	13,681	71.9
125	Republican	Bob Allen	re-elected	Democratic	William J. Casey	5,359	28.1
126	Democratic	Dante Santoni	re-elected	Democratic	Dante Santoni	12,026	73.4
126	Democratic	Dante Santoni	re-elected	Republican	Roberta Carlisle	3,906	23.9
126	Democratic	Dante Santoni	re-elected	Libertarian	David L. Tartaglia	444	2.7
127	Democratic	Thomas R. Caltagirone	re-elected	Democratic	Thomas R. Caltagirone	7,017	71.9
127	Democratic	Thomas R. Caltagirone	re-elected	Republican	Francis Acosta	2,740	28.1
128	Republican	Samuel E. Rohrer	re-elected	Republican	Samuel E. Rohrer	13,732	64.9
128	Republican	Samuel E. Rohrer	re-elected	Democratic	Ryan B. Wynings	7,427	35.1
129	Republican	Sheila Miller	re-elected	Republican	Sheila Miller	12,931	70.9
129	Republican	Sheila Miller	re-elected	Democratic	Lucille M. Brady	5,301	29.1
130	Republican	Dennis E. Leh	re-elected	Republican	Dennis E. Leh	12,538	67.8
130	Republican	Dennis E. Leh	re-elected	Democratic	Denton L. Schucker	5,967	32.2
131	Republican	Pat Browne	re-elected	Republican	Pat Browne	10,410	61.7
131	Republican	Pat Browne	re-elected	Democratic	Peter Schweyer	6,468	38.3
132	Democratic	Jennifer Mann	re-elected	Democratic	Jennifer Mann	7,648	100
133	Democratic	T. J. Rooney	re-elected	Democratic	T. J. Rooney	8,172	68.2
133	Democratic	T. J. Rooney	re-elected	Republican	Howard Forman	3,813	31.8
134	Republican	Jane S. Baker	retired	Republican	Douglas G. Reichley	12,765	63.0
134	Republican	Jane S. Baker	retired	Democratic	J.P. Raynock	7,485	37.0
135	Democratic	Steve Samuelson	re-elected	Democratic	Steve Samuelson	10,616	64.4
135	Democratic	Steve Samuelson	re-elected	Republican	Keith A. Strunk	5,881	35.6
136	Democratic	Robert Freeman	re-elected	Democratic	Robert Freeman	9,065	100
137	Democratic	Richard T. Grucela	re-elected	Democratic	Richard T. Grucela	11,442	100
138	Republican	Craig A. Dally	re-elected	Republican	Craig A. Dally	12,314	100
139	Republican	Jerry Birmelin	re-elected	Republican	Jerry Birmelin	11,066	100
140	Democratic	Thomas C. Corrigan	re-elected	Democratic	Thomas C. Corrigan	11,787	100
141	Democratic	Anthony J. Melio	re-elected	Democratic	Anthony J. Melio	11,905	73.2
141	Democratic	Anthony J. Melio	re-elected	Republican	George Dranginis	4,358	26.8
142	Republican	Matthew N. Wright	re-elected	Republican	Matthew N. Wright	12,217	59.0
142	Republican	Matthew N. Wright	re-elected	Democratic	Christopher J. King	8,482	41.0
143	Republican	Chuck McIlhinney	re-elected	Republican	Chuck McIlhinney	12,559	58.2
143	Republican	Chuck McIlhinney	re-elected	Democratic	Betsy Helsel	9,012	41.8
144	Republican	Katharine M. Watson	re-elected	Republican	Katharine M. Watson	13,386	86.6
144	Republican	Katharine M. Watson	re-elected	Green	Tom Heitzenrater	2,072	13.4
145	Republican	Paul Irvin Clymer	re-elected	Republican	Paul I. Clymer	11,814	68.3
145	Republican	Paul Irvin Clymer	re-elected	Democratic	Joellen F. Gross	4,984	28.8
145	Republican	Paul Irvin Clymer	re-elected	Green	Charles W. Moyer	488	2.8
146	Republican	Mary Ann Dailey	re-elected	Republican	Mary Ann Dailey	8,950	58.0
146	Republican	Mary Ann Dailey	re-elected	Democratic	Dan Weand	6,494	42.0
147	Republican	Raymond Bunt	re-elected	Republican	Raymond Bunt	12,294	100
148	Republican	Lita Indzel Cohen	retired	Republican	Melissa Murphy Weber	13,194	51.2
148	Republican	Lita Indzel Cohen	retired	Democratic	Karen Kaskey	12,554	48.8
149	Republican	Wallis Brooks	defeated	Democratic	Daylin Leach	11,726	52.6
149	Republican	Wallis Brooks	defeated	Republican	Wallis Brooks	10,556	47.4
150	Democratic	John A. Lawless	defeated	Republican	Jacqueline R. Crahalla	8,725	50.2
150	Democratic	John A. Lawless	defeated	Democratic	John A. Lawless	8,662	49.8
151	Republican	Eugene F. McGill	re-elected	Republican	Eugene F. McGill	12,568	62.3
151	Republican	Eugene F. McGill	re-elected	Democratic	Andrew T. Hornak	7,619	37.7
152	Republican	Roy W. Cornell	re-elected	Republican	Roy W. Cornell	13,940	100
153	Republican	Ellen M. Bard	re-elected	Republican	Ellen M. Bard	15,641	66.0
153	Republican	Ellen M. Bard	re-elected	Democratic	Susan Liberace	8,061	34.0
154	Democratic	Lawrence H. Curry	re-elected	Democratic	Lawrence H. Curry	19,783	100
155	Republican	Curt Schroder	re-elected	Republican	Curt Schroder	16,152	100
156	Republican	Elinor Z. Taylor	re-elected	Republican	Elinor Z. Taylor	12,707	63.9
156	Republican	Elinor Z. Taylor	re-elected	Democratic	Robert M. Hodies	7,189	36.1
157	Republican	Carole A. Rubley	re-elected	Republican	Carole A. Rubley	14,474	65.9
157	Republican	Carole A. Rubley	re-elected	Democratic	Anthony C. DiGirolomo	7,498	34.1
158	Republican	L. Chris Ross	re-elected	Republican	L. Chris Ross	13,381	71.7
158	Republican	L. Chris Ross	re-elected	Democratic	Mario J. Calvarese	5,293	28.3
159	Democratic	Thaddeus Kirkland	re-elected	Democratic	Thaddeus Kirkland	6,689	54.4
159	Democratic	Thaddeus Kirkland	re-elected	Republican	Lavada E.Y. Driggins	5,599	45.6
160	Republican	Stephen Barrar	re-elected	Republican	Stephen Barrar	15,842	100
161	Republican	Tom Gannon	re-elected	Republican	Tom Gannon	13,258	52.4
161	Republican	Tom Gannon	re-elected	Democratic	Sara Lynn Petrosky	12,035	47.6
162	Republican	Ron Raymond	re-elected	Republican	Ron Raymond	13,467	72.7
162	Republican	Ron Raymond	re-elected	Democratic	Joseph G. Papaleo	4,831	26.1
162	Republican	Ron Raymond	re-elected	Libertarian	David R. Jahn	235	1.3
163	Republican	Nicholas A. Micozzie	re-elected	Republican	Nicholas A. Micozzie	13,666	68.0
163	Republican	Nicholas A. Micozzie	re-elected	Democratic	Beverly D. Uram	6,441	32.0
164	Republican	Mario J. Civera	re-elected	Republican	Mario J. Civera	11,477	68.0
164	Republican	Mario J. Civera	re-elected	Democratic	Alfred Achtert, Jr.	5,409	32.0
165	Republican	William F. Adolph	re-elected	Republican	William F. Adolph	15,321	69.5
165	Republican	William F. Adolph	re-elected	Democratic	Bob Small	6,728	30.5
166	Democratic	Greg Vitali	re-elected	Democratic	Greg Vitali	15,703	64.0
166	Democratic	Greg Vitali	re-elected	Republican	William R. Toal III	8,844	36.0
167	Republican	Bob Flick	re-elected	Republican	Bob Flick	17,293	100
168	Republican	Matthew J. Ryan	re-elected	Republican	Matthew J. Ryan	15,071	66.3
168	Republican	Matthew J. Ryan	re-elected	Democratic	Bill Thomas	7,663	33.7
169	Republican	Dennis M. O'Brien	re-elected	Republican	Dennis M. O'Brien	13,440	100
170	Republican	George T. Kenney	re-elected	Republican	George T. Kenney	12,381	65.3
170	Republican	George T. Kenney	re-elected	Democratic	Harry C. Citrino III	6,567	34.7
171	Republican	Kerry A. Benninghoff	re-elected	Republican	Kerry A. Benninghoff	11,223	74.2
171	Republican	Kerry A. Benninghoff	re-elected	Democratic	Rodney Musser	3,900	25.8
172	Republican	John M. Perzel	re-elected	Republican	John M. Perzel	17,498	81.7
172	Republican	John M. Perzel	re-elected	Democratic	Paul Prior	3,914	18.3
173	Democratic	Michael P. McGeehan	re-elected	Democratic	Michael P. McGeehan	11,946	82.8
173	Democratic	Michael P. McGeehan	re-elected	Republican	David J. Linsalata	2,481	17.2
174	Democratic	Alan L. Butkovitz	re-elected	Democratic	Alan Butkovitz	13,082	80.2
174	Democratic	Alan L. Butkovitz	re-elected	Republican	Glenn C. Romano	3,221	19.8
175	Democratic	Marie Lederer	re-elected	Democratic	Marie Lederer	11,725	100
176	Republican	Mario Scavello	re-elected	Republican	Mario Scavello	8,115	64.5
176	Republican	Mario Scavello	re-elected	Democratic	Gratz Washenik	4,463	35.5
177	Republican	John J. Taylor	re-elected	Republican	John J. Taylor	12,346	78.2
177	Republican	John J. Taylor	re-elected	Democratic	Patrick Parkinson	3,443	21.8
178	Republican	Roy Reinard	retired	Republican	Scott A. Petri	12,943	55.1
178	Republican	Roy Reinard	retired	Democratic	Carl Cherkin	10,537	44.9
179	Democratic	William W. Rieger	re-elected	Democratic	William W. Rieger	8,031	81.6
179	Democratic	William W. Rieger	re-elected	Republican	Troy L. Bouie	1,628	16.5
179	Democratic	William W. Rieger	re-elected	Independent	Frank M. Garcia	188	1.9
180	Democratic	Angel Cruz	re-elected	Democratic	Angel Cruz	6,635	86.0
180	Democratic	Angel Cruz	re-elected	Republican	Steven N. Kush	960	12.4
180	Democratic	Angel Cruz	re-elected	Green	Ernst Ford	122	1.6
181	Democratic	W. Curtis Thomas	re-elected	Democratic	W. Curtis Thomas	11,723	100
182	Democratic	Babette Josephs	re-elected	Democratic	Babette Josephs	13,633	78.9
182	Democratic	Babette Josephs	re-elected	Republican	Jonathan S. Goldstein	3,639	21.1
183	Republican	Julie Harhart	re-elected	Republican	Julie Harhart	11,599	68.5
183	Republican	Julie Harhart	re-elected	Democratic	Mike Mullen	5,343	31.5
184	Democratic	William F. Keller	re-elected	Democratic	William F. Keller	13,138	100
185	Democratic	Robert C. Donatucci	re-elected	Democratic	Robert C. Donatucci	11,089	80.2
185	Democratic	Robert C. Donatucci	re-elected	Republican	Michael C. Gallagher	2,743	19.8
186	Democratic	Harold James	re-elected	Democratic	Harold James	12,925	100
187	Republican	Paul W. Semmel	re-elected	Republican	Paul W. Semmel	11,402	67
187	Republican	Paul W. Semmel	re-elected	Democratic	William G. Zollers	5,618	33
188	Democratic	James R. Roebuck	re-elected	Democratic	James R. Roebuck	10,937	100
189	Republican	Kelly Lewis	re-elected	Republican	Kelly Lewis	8,622	100
190	Democratic	Mike Horsey	re-elected	Democratic	Michael Horsey	14,231	96.8
190	Democratic	Mike Horsey	re-elected	Republican	Bruce M. Harris	463	3.2
191	Democratic	Ronald G. Waters	re-elected	Democratic	Ronald G. Waters	13,467	100
192	Democratic	Louise Bishop	re-elected	Democratic	Louise Bishop	15,854	100
193	Republican	Steven R. Nickol	re-elected	Republican	Steven R. Nickol	10,691	71.9
193	Republican	Steven R. Nickol	re-elected	Democratic	Bill Panebaker	4,171	28.1
194	Democratic	Kathy Manderino	re-elected	Democratic	Kathy M. Manderino	14,248	80.0
194	Democratic	Kathy Manderino	re-elected	Republican	Valerie A. McCoy	3,561	20.0
195	Democratic	Frank L. Oliver	re-elected	Democratic	Frank L. Oliver	14,199	100
196	Republican	Beverly Mackereth	re-elected	Republican	Beverly Mackereth	13,212	81.4
196	Republican	Beverly Mackereth	re-elected	Democratic	Leo Cooper	3,029	18.7
197	Democratic	Jewell Williams	re-elected	Democratic	Jewell Williams	14,178	100
198	Democratic	Rosita C. Youngblood	re-elected	Democratic	Rosita C. Youngblood	14,201	100
199	Republican	Will Gabig	re-elected	Republican	William I. Gabig	9,603	59.2
199	Republican	Will Gabig	re-elected	Democratic	Christian R. Muniz	6,632	40.9
200	Democratic	Leanna M. Washington	re-elected	Democratic	Leanna M. Washington	18,700	87.8
200	Democratic	Leanna M. Washington	re-elected	Republican	Robert G. Rossman	2,607	12.2
201	Democratic	John Myers	re-elected	Democratic	John Myers	14,927	96.9
201	Democratic	John Myers	re-elected	Republican	Joseph L. Messa	485	3.1
202	Democratic	Mark B. Cohen	re-elected	Democratic	Mark B. Cohen	11,119	76.0
202	Democratic	Mark B. Cohen	re-elected	Republican	Gary Grisafi	3,505	24.0
203	Democratic	Dwight Evans	re-elected	Democratic	Dwight Evans	13,740	90.1
203	Democratic	Dwight Evans	re-elected	Republican	Christopher Coates	1,508	9.9
