= 2006 Pennsylvania House of Representatives election =

- November 7, 2006

All 203 seats in the Pennsylvania House of Representatives 102 seats needed for a majority
	Majority party	Minority party
Leader	Bill DeWeese	John Perzel
Party	Democratic	Republican
Leader since	January 3, 1995	March 29, 2003
Leader's seat	50th	172nd
Last election	93	110
Seats before	94	109
Seats after	102	101
Seat change	▲8	▼8
- Results: Democratic hold Democratic gain Republican hold Republican gain
Speaker before election
John Perzel
Republican
Elected Speaker
Dennis O'Brien
Republican

The 2006 elections for the Pennsylvania House of Representatives were held on November 7, 2006, with all districts being contested. Necessary primary elections were held on May 16, 2006. Members elected in 2006 were inaugurated on January 2, 2007. State Representatives are elected for two-year terms, with the entire House of Representatives up for a vote every two years.

While initial results of the elections showed the Republicans holding onto a one-seat majority in the state house, the race in the 156th district in Chester County had only 19 votes separating the candidates. A further count of provisional ballots and absentee ballots gave the Democrats a victory in the 156th district by 23 votes. A recount proved decisive in the Democrats' favor with the margin increasing to 28 votes. This turned control of the state house to the Democrats for the first time since 1994.

As a further note, the pay raise scandal claimed one more high-level victim as Rep. Mike Veon, the Democratic Whip, was defeated for re-election.

== Overview ==
Affiliation	Seats at Last Election	Seats at End of Legislative Session	Seats after Election	Change Since Last Election
Democratic	93	94	102	+8
Republican	110	109	101	-8

== Predictions ==
Source	Ranking	As of
Rothenberg	Tossup	November 4, 2006

== General election ==
District	Party	Incumbent	Status	Party	Candidate	Votes	%
1	Democratic	Linda Bebko-Jones	retired	Democratic	Patrick J. Harkins	9,665	75.0
1	Democratic	Linda Bebko-Jones	retired	Republican	Christine E. Pontoriero	3,226	25.0
2	Democratic	Florindo Fabrizio	re-elected	Democratic	Florindo Fabrizio	14,759	100
3	Republican	Matthew W. Good	defeated	Democratic	John Hornaman	11,188	48.8
3	Republican	Matthew W. Good	defeated	Republican	Matthew W. Good	11,043	48.1
3	Republican	Matthew W. Good	defeated	Green	Timothy P. Reim	714	3.1
4	Republican	Curt Sonney	re-elected	Republican	Curt Sonney	14,356	100
5	Republican	John R. Evans	re-elected	Republican	John R. Evans	9,263	51.4
5	Republican	John R. Evans	re-elected	Democratic	Jason White	7,139	39.6
5	Republican	John R. Evans	re-elected	Independent	Scott R. Rastetter	1,341	7.4
5	Republican	John R. Evans	re-elected	Libertarian	Edward H. Tonkin	286	1.6
6	Republican	Teresa Forcier	defeated in primary	Republican	Brad Roae	10,590	60.8
6	Republican	Teresa Forcier	defeated in primary	Democratic	Keith Abbott	6,821	39.2
7	Democratic	Michael C. Gruitza	retired	Democratic	Mark Longietti	17,756	100
8	Republican	Dick Stevenson	re-elected	Republican	Dick Stevenson	16,742	100
9	Democratic	Chris Sainato	re-elected	Democratic	Chris Sainato	18,397	100
10	Democratic	Frank LaGrotta	defeated in primary	Democratic	Jaret Gibbons	11,969	62.5
10	Democratic	Frank LaGrotta	defeated in primary	Republican	Chuck Morse	7,180	37.5
11	Republican	Brian L. Ellis	re-elected	Republican	Brian L. Ellis	13,381	64.7
11	Republican	Brian L. Ellis	re-elected	Democratic	Bill Neel	7,286	35.3
12	Republican	Daryl Metcalfe	re-elected	Republican	Daryl Metcalfe	19,488	100
13	Republican	Arthur D. Hershey	re-elected	Republican	Arthur D. Hershey	12,257	53.9
13	Republican	Arthur D. Hershey	re-elected	Democratic	Tom Houghton	10,482	46.1
14	Democratic	Mike Veon	defeated	Republican	Jim E. Marshall	10,756	53.9
14	Democratic	Mike Veon	defeated	Democratic	Mike Veon	9,213	46.1
15	Democratic	Vince Biancucci	re-elected	Democratic	Vince Biancucci	11,712	50.6
15	Democratic	Vince Biancucci	re-elected	Republican	Todd Hockenberry	11,419	49.4
16	Democratic	Sean Ramaley	re-elected	Democratic	Sean Ramaley	17,563	100
17	Republican	Rod E. Wilt	retired	Republican	Michele Brooks	10,288	52.8
17	Republican	Rod E. Wilt	retired	Democratic	Frank H. Weaver	9,196	47.2
18	Republican	Gene DiGirolamo	re-elected	Republican	Gene DiGirolamo	12,149	62.5
18	Republican	Gene DiGirolamo	re-elected	Democratic	Harris Martin	7,296	37.5
19	Democratic	Jake Wheatley	re-elected	Democratic	Jake Wheatley	11,894	100
20	Democratic	Don Walko	re-elected	Democratic	Don Walko	12,724	65.1
20	Democratic	Don Walko	re-elected	Republican	Bill Stalter	6,089	31.2
20	Democratic	Don Walko	re-elected	Constitution	Jim Barr	719	3.7
21	Democratic	Frank J. Pistella	defeated in primary	Democratic	Lisa Bennington	16,500	100
22	Republican	Michael Diven	defeated	Democratic	Chelsa Wagner	12,207	55.3
22	Republican	Michael Diven	defeated	Republican	Michael Diven	9,849	44.7
23	Democratic	Dan B. Frankel	re-elected	Democratic	Dan B. Frankel	19,036	100
24	Democratic	Joseph Preston	re-elected	Democratic	Joseph Preston	14,024	86.2
24	Democratic	Joseph Preston	re-elected	None	Todd Elliott Koger	2,250	13.8
25	Democratic	Joseph F. Markosek	re-elected	Democratic	Joseph F. Markosek	14,368	62.2
25	Democratic	Joseph F. Markosek	re-elected	Republican	Ed Nicholson	8,744	37.8
26	Republican	Tim Hennessey	re-elected	Republican	Tim Hennessey	13,703	82.7
26	Republican	Tim Hennessey	re-elected	Socialist	Jeff M. Brindle	2,873	17.3
27	Democratic	Thomas C. Petrone	re-elected	Democratic	Thomas C. Petrone	12,874	66.4
27	Democratic	Thomas C. Petrone	re-elected	Republican	Bill Ogden	6,525	33.6
28	Republican	Mike Turzai	re-elected	Republican	Mike Turzai	19,850	71.3
28	Republican	Mike Turzai	re-elected	Democratic	John Henry	7,988	28.7
29	Republican	Bernie O'Neill	re-elected	Republican	Bernie O'Neill	14,408	56.1
29	Republican	Bernie O'Neill	re-elected	Democratic	Brad Kirsch	11,255	43.9
30	Democratic	Shawn Flaherty	defeated	Republican	Randy Vulakovich	15,276	53.0
30	Democratic	Shawn Flaherty	defeated	Democratic	Shawn Flaherty	13,563	47.0
31	Republican	David J. Steil	re-elected	Republican	David J. Steil	13,726	51.6
31	Republican	David J. Steil	re-elected	Democratic	Michael Diamond	12,864	48.4
32	Democratic	Anthony M. Deluca	re-elected	Democratic	Anthony M. Deluca	18,130	100
33	Democratic	Frank Dermody	re-elected	Democratic	Frank Dermody	11,317	51.0
33	Democratic	Frank Dermody	re-elected	Republican	Eileen Watt	10,893	49.0
34	Democratic	Paul Costa	re-elected	Democratic	Paul Costa	18123	100
35	Democratic	Marc Gergely	re-elected	Democratic	Marc Gergely	14,767	100
36	Democratic	Harry Readshaw	re-elected	Democratic	Harry Readshaw	17,296	100
37	Republican	Tom Creighton	re-elected	Republican	Tom Creighton	13,703	69.8
37	Republican	Tom Creighton	re-elected	Democratic	Lee Heffner	5,918	30.2
38	Democratic	Kenneth W. Ruffing	defeated in primary	Democratic	Bill Kortz	14,838	70.8
38	Democratic	Kenneth W. Ruffing	defeated in primary	Republican	Daniel J. Davis	6,125	29.2
39	Democratic	David K. Levdansky	re-elected	Democratic	David Levdansky	16,953	100
40	Republican	John Maher	re-elected	Republican	John A. Maher	20,323	100
41	Republican	Katie True	re-elected	Republican	Katie True	17,039	81.9
41	Republican	Katie True	re-elected	Independent	Kenneth C. Brenneman	3,762	18.1
42	Republican	Thomas L. Stevenson	defeated in primary	Democratic	Matthew H. Smith	16,568	58.4
42	Republican	Thomas L. Stevenson	defeated in primary	Republican	Mark Harris	11,795	41.6
43	Republican	Scott W. Boyd	re-elected	Republican	Scott W. Boyd	16,218	100
44	Republican	Mark Mustio	re-elected	Republican	Mark Mustio	14,933	59.7
44	Republican	Mark Mustio	re-elected	Democratic	Ray J. Uhric	10,072	40.3
45	Democratic	Nick Kotik	re-elected	Democratic	Nick Kotik	18,024	100
46	Democratic	Victor John Lescovitz	retired	Democratic	Jesse J. White	11,945	53.8
46	Democratic	Victor John Lescovitz	retired	Republican	Paul Snatchko	10,251	46.2
47	Republican	Keith J. Gillespie	re-elected	Republican	Keith J. Gillespie	18,289	100
48	Democratic	Timothy J. Solobay	re-elected	Democratic	Timothy Joseph Solobay	15,907	82.9
48	Democratic	Timothy J. Solobay	re-elected	Libertarian	Demo Agoris	3,274	17.1
49	Democratic	Peter J. Daley	re-elected	Democratic	Peter J. Daley	11,841	63.4
49	Democratic	Peter J. Daley	re-elected	Republican	Edward S. Angell	6,838	36.6
50	Democratic	Bill DeWeese	re-elected	Democratic	Bill DeWeese	10,035	52.7
50	Democratic	Bill DeWeese	re-elected	Republican	Greg Hopkins	8,994	47.3
51	Democratic	Larry Roberts	retired	Democratic	Timothy S. Mahoney	9,476	61.8
51	Democratic	Larry Roberts	retired	Republican	John Mikita	5,858	38.2
52	Democratic	James E. Shaner	retired	Democratic	Deberah Kula	11,077	68.2
52	Democratic	James E. Shaner	retired	Republican	William R. Earnesty	5,161	31.8
53	Republican	Robert W. Godshall	re-elected	Republican	Robert W. Godshall	11,741	58.9
53	Republican	Robert W. Godshall	re-elected	Democratic	John W. Jack Hansen	8,177	41.1
54	Democratic	John E. Pallone	re-elected	Democratic	John E. Pallone	12,801	59.0
54	Democratic	John E. Pallone	re-elected	Republican	Scott Witon	8,908	41.0
55	Democratic	Joseph A. Petrarca	re-elected	Democratic	Joseph A. Petrarca	15,473	100
56	Democratic	James E. Casorio	re-elected	Democratic	James E. Casorio	14,496	62.6
56	Democratic	James E. Casorio	re-elected	Republican	Joel Reiter	7,947	34.3
56	Democratic	James E. Casorio	re-elected	Go Steelers	Brian S. Blasko	732	3.2
57	Democratic	Thomas A. Tangretti	re-elected	Democratic	Thomas A. Tangretti	14,118	68.4
57	Democratic	Thomas A. Tangretti	re-elected	Republican	Steve Schaefer	6,519	31.6
58	Democratic	R. Ted Harhai	re-elected	Democratic	R. Ted Harhai	13,911	65.6
58	Democratic	R. Ted Harhai	re-elected	Republican	Pete McConnell	7,295	34.4
59	Republican	Jess Stairs	re-elected	Republican	Jess Stairs	20,334	100
60	Republican	Jeff Pyle	re-elected	Republican	Jeff Pyle	13,791	70.4
60	Republican	Jeff Pyle	re-elected	Democratic	Ron Covone	5,803	29.6
61	Republican	Kate M. Harper	re-elected	Republican	Kate M. Harper	13,839	54.8
61	Republican	Kate M. Harper	re-elected	Democratic	Ron Stoloff	11,406	45.2
62	Republican	Dave Reed	re-elected	Republican	Dave Reed	11377	62.6
62	Republican	Dave Reed	re-elected	Democratic	Cynthia J. Spielman	6,811	37.4
63	Republican	Fred McIlhattan	re-elected	Republican	Fred McIlhattan	13,449	72.8
63	Republican	Fred McIlhattan	re-elected	Democratic	Christopher Shropshire	4,378	23.7
63	Republican	Fred McIlhattan	re-elected	Libertarian	Michael J. Robertson	380	2.1
63	Republican	Fred McIlhattan	re-elected	Constitution	Timothy E. Champion	271	1.5
64	Republican	Scott E. Hutchinson	re-elected	Republican	Scott E. Hutchinson	12,481	66
64	Republican	Scott E. Hutchinson	re-elected	Democratic	Gary Hutchison	6,444	34.1
65	Republican	Kathy Rapp	re-elected	Republican	Kathy L. Rapp	16,168	100
66	Republican	Sam Smith	re-elected	Republican	Sam Smith	9,290	56.0
66	Republican	Sam Smith	re-elected	Democratic	Samy Elmasry	6,293	38.0
66	Republican	Sam Smith	re-elected	Constitution	Janet Y. Serene	995	6.0
67	Republican	Martin T. Causer	re-elected	Republican	Martin T. Causer	12,640	100
68	Republican	Matthew E. Baker	re-elected	Republican	Matthew E. Baker	17,235	100
69	Republican	Bob Bastian	re-elected	Republican	Bob Bastian	15,664	100
70	Republican	John W. Fichter	retired	Republican	Jay R. Moyer	10,912	49.1
70	Republican	John W. Fichter	retired	Democratic	Netta Young Hughes	10,809	48.7
70	Republican	John W. Fichter	retired	Libertarian	Kat Valleley	486	2.2
71	Democratic	Edward P. Wojnaroski	re-elected	Democratic	Edward P. Wojnaroski	15,915	78.3
71	Democratic	Edward P. Wojnaroski	re-elected	Republican	Ronald J. Esposito	4,423	21.7
72	Democratic	Tom Yewcic	re-elected	Democratic	Tom Yewcic	16,989	74.3
72	Democratic	Tom Yewcic	re-elected	Republican	Scott W. Hunt	5,880	25.7
73	Democratic	Gary Haluska	re-elected	Democratic	Gary Haluska	13,596	71.0
73	Democratic	Gary Haluska	re-elected	Republican	Brian Tibbott	5,555	29.0
74	Democratic	Camille George	re-elected	Democratic	Camille George	11386	63.3
74	Democratic	Camille George	re-elected	Republican	Richard Hansel	6,613	36.7
75	Democratic	Dan A. Surra	re-elected	Democratic	Dan A. Surra	11,775	61.3
75	Democratic	Dan A. Surra	re-elected	Republican	Todd Hanes	7438	38.7
76	Democratic	Mike Hanna	re-elected	Democratic	Mike Hanna	13,446	100
77	Republican	Lynn Herman	retired	Democratic	Scott Conklin	12,083	59.0
77	Republican	Lynn Herman	retired	Republican	Barbara H. Spencer	8,387	41.0
78	Republican	Dick L. Hess	re-elected	Republican	Dick L. Hess	13470	68.5
78	Republican	Dick L. Hess	re-elected	Democratic	Gary Ebersole	6,188	31.5
79	Republican	Richard A. Geist	re-elected	Republican	Richard A. Geist	13,786	100
80	Republican	Jerry A. Stern	re-elected	Republican	Jerry A. Stern	18,285	100
81	Republican	Larry O. Sather	retired	Republican	Mike Fleck	11,065	64.8
81	Republican	Larry O. Sather	retired	Democratic	Roy E. Thomas	6,014	35.2
82	Republican	C. Adam Harris	re-elected	Republican	C. Adam Harris	10,927	58.2
82	Republican	C. Adam Harris	re-elected	Democratic	Teresa J. O'Neal	7,837	41.8
83	Republican	Steven W. Cappelli	re-elected	Republican	Steven W. Cappelli	10,519	59.5
83	Republican	Steven W. Cappelli	re-elected	Democratic	Richard Mirabito	7,153	40.5
84	Republican	Brett Feese	retired	Republican	Garth D. Everett	11,585	63.4
84	Republican	Brett Feese	retired	Democratic	Thomas Paternostro	6,697	36.6
85	Republican	Russ Fairchild	re-elected	Republican	Russ Fairchild	11,482	68.0
85	Republican	Russ Fairchild	re-elected	Democratic	Stephen Connolley	5,404	32.0
86	Republican	Mark K. Keller	re-elected	Republican	Mark K. Keller	16,621	100
87	Republican	Glen R. Grell	re-elected	Republican	Glen R. Grell	17,400	66.3
87	Republican	Glen R. Grell	re-elected	Democratic	Joseph D. Lombardi	8860	33.7
88	Republican	Jerry L. Nailor	re-elected	Republican	Jerry L. Nailor	16,776	69.1
88	Republican	Jerry L. Nailor	re-elected	Democratic	Margaret M. Stuski	6,685	27.6
88	Republican	Jerry L. Nailor	re-elected	Green	Christopher E. Irvin	804	3.3
89	Republican	Rob Kauffman	re-elected	Republican	Rob Kauffman	13,523	69.9
89	Republican	Rob Kauffman	re-elected	Democratic	Andrew Alosi	5,822	30.1
90	Republican	Patrick E. Fleagle	defeated	Republican	Todd Rock	11,614	54.0
90	Republican	Patrick E. Fleagle	defeated	Democratic	Patrick E. Fleagle	9,895	46.0
91	Republican	Stephen R. Maitland	defeated in primary	Republican	Dan Moul	10,234	51.9
91	Republican	Stephen R. Maitland	defeated in primary	Democratic	Patrick L. Naugle	8,176	41.4
91	Republican	Stephen R. Maitland	defeated in primary	Green	Lynn Smallwood	1,324	6.7
92	Republican	Bruce Smith	retired	Republican	Scott Perry	16,072	70.8
92	Republican	Bruce Smith	retired	Democratic	Laurence Ellsperman	6,620	29.2
93	Republican	Ron Miller	re-elected	Republican	Ron Miller	19,185	100
94	Republican	Stanley E. Saylor	re-elected	Republican	Stanley E. Saylor	14,599	73.5
94	Republican	Stanley E. Saylor	re-elected	Democratic	Maxine J. Kuntz	5268	26.5
95	Democratic	Stephen H. Stetler	resigned	Democratic	Eugene DePasquale	7,561	58.3
95	Democratic	Stephen H. Stetler	resigned	Republican	Karen Emenheiser	5,412	41.7
96	Democratic	Mike Sturla	re-elected	Democratic	Mike Sturla	7,604	63.0
96	Democratic	Mike Sturla	re-elected	Republican	Patrick Snyder	4,464	37.0
97	Republican	Roy E. Baldwin	defeated in primary	Republican	John C. Bear	15,243	61.9
97	Republican	Roy E. Baldwin	defeated in primary	Democratic	Timothy L. Callahan	9,377	38.1
98	Republican	David Hickernell	re-elected	Republican	David Hickernell	15119	100
99	Republican	Gordon R. Denlinger	re-elected	Republican	Gordon Denlinger	12,114	74.4
99	Republican	Gordon R. Denlinger	re-elected	Democratic	Ginny Diilio	4168	25.6
100	Republican	Gibson C. Armstrong	defeated in primary	Republican	Bryan Cutler	12,606	100
101	Republican	Mauree A. Gingrich	re-elected	Republican	Mauree Gingrich	14,338	84.4
101	Republican	Mauree A. Gingrich	re-elected	Green	Eric R. Wolfe	2,653	15.6
102	Republican	Peter J. Zug	defeated in primary	Republican	Rosemarie Swanger	15,082	80.3
102	Republican	Peter J. Zug	defeated in primary	Libertarian	Raymond S. Ondrusek	3,702	19.7
103	Democratic	Ron Buxton	re-elected	Democratic	Ron Buxton	9,542	72.5
103	Democratic	Ron Buxton	re-elected	Republican	Anthony J. Tezak, Jr.	3,620	27.5
104	Republican	Mark S. McNaughton	retired	Republican	Susan C. Helm	12,685	56.6
104	Republican	Mark S. McNaughton	retired	Democratic	Dennis E. Coffman	9,718	43.4
105	Republican	Ron Marsico	re-elected	Republican	Ron Marsico	17,865	67.7
105	Republican	Ron Marsico	re-elected	Democratic	Cheryl A. Nick	8,529	32.3
106	Republican	John D. Payne	re-elected	Republican	John D. Payne	15,972	100
107	Democratic	Robert E. Belfanti	re-elected	Democratic	Robert E. Belfanti	13,284	100
108	Republican	Merle H. Phillips	re-elected	Republican	Merle H. Phillips	13,212	74.2
108	Republican	Merle H. Phillips	re-elected	Democratic	Antonio D. Michetti	4,124	23.2
108	Republican	Merle H. Phillips	re-elected	Green	Dodie R. Lovett	465	2.6
109	Republican	David R. Millard	re-elected	Republican	David R. Millard	9,949	58.5
109	Republican	David R. Millard	re-elected	Democratic	David D. Slavick	7,058	41.5
110	Republican	Tina Pickett	re-elected	Republican	Tina Pickett	13,891	72.7
110	Republican	Tina Pickett	re-elected	Democratic	Diane V. Ward	5,219	27.3
111	Republican	Sandra J. Major	re-elected	Republican	Sandra Major	16,013	82.6
111	Republican	Sandra J. Major	re-elected	Green	Jay Sweeney	3,381	17.4
112	Democratic	Fred Belardi	defeated in primary	Democratic	Kenneth J. Smith	16,330	100
113	Democratic	Gaynor Cawley	retired	Democratic	Frank Andrews Shimkus	15,384	72.1
113	Democratic	Gaynor Cawley	retired	Republican	Matthew Burke	5,951	27.9
114	Democratic	Jim Wansacz	re-elected	Democratic	Jim Wansacz	21,199	100
115	Democratic	Edward G. Staback	re-elected	Democratic	Edward G. Staback	18,757	100
116	Democratic	Todd A. Eachus	re-elected	Democratic	Todd A. Eachus	12,469	86.0
116	Democratic	Todd A. Eachus	re-elected	Independent	Michael S. Klesh	2,037	14.0
117	Republican	George C. Hasay	retired	Republican	Karen Boback	12,724	67.3
117	Republican	George C. Hasay	retired	Democratic	Fred Nichols, Jr.	6,193	32.7
118	Democratic	Thomas M. Tigue	retired	Democratic	Michael B. Carroll	12,224	67.4
118	Democratic	Thomas M. Tigue	retired	Republican	Maureen Tatu	5,906	32.6
119	Democratic	John T. Yudichak	re-elected	Democratic	John T. Yudichak	13,713	80.4
119	Democratic	John T. Yudichak	re-elected	Republican	Ed Sieminski	3,336	19.6
120	Democratic	Phyllis Mundy	re-elected	Democratic	Phyllis Mundy	15,026	74.4
120	Democratic	Phyllis Mundy	re-elected	Republican	John C. Cordora	5160	25.6
121	Democratic	Kevin Blaum	retired	Democratic	Eddie Day Pashinski	9,836	64.9
121	Democratic	Kevin Blaum	retired	Republican	Christine Katsock	5,318	35.1
122	Democratic	Keith R. McCall	re-elected	Democratic	Keith R. McCall	11,648	66.5
122	Democratic	Keith R. McCall	re-elected	Republican	Glenn F. Confer, Sr.	5,880	33.5
123	Democratic	Neal P. Goodman	re-elected	Democratic	Neal P. Goodman	11,946	67.7
123	Democratic	Neal P. Goodman	re-elected	Republican	Michael C. Cadau	5,702	32.3
124	Republican	David G. Argall	re-elected	Republican	David G. Argall	13,324	62.4
124	Republican	David G. Argall	re-elected	Democratic	Bill Mackey	8,036	37.6
125	Republican	Bob Allen	defeated in primary	Democratic	Tim Seip	10,355	53.7
125	Republican	Bob Allen	defeated in primary	Republican	Gary L. Hornberger	8,923	46.3
126	Democratic	Dante Santoni	re-elected	Democratic	Dante Santoni	11,164	64.0
126	Democratic	Dante Santoni	re-elected	Republican	Hal Baker	6290	36.0
127	Democratic	Thomas R. Caltagirone	re-elected	Democratic	Thomas R. Caltagirone	8,450	100
128	Republican	Samuel E. Rohrer	re-elected	Republican	Samuel E. Rohrer	13,225	54.8
128	Republican	Samuel E. Rohrer	re-elected	Democratic	Russell S. Hummel	10,889	45.2
129	Republican	Sheila Miller	retired	Republican	Jim A. Cox	11,318	53.1
129	Republican	Sheila Miller	retired	Democratic	William G. Evans	8,984	42.1
129	Republican	Sheila Miller	retired	Libertarian	Jeremy Levan	1,024	4.8
130	Republican	Dennis E. Leh	defeated in primary	Democratic	David R. Kessler	12,902	57.3
130	Republican	Dennis E. Leh	defeated in primary	Republican	Billy A. Reed	9,609	42.7
131	Republican	Karen D. Beyer	re-elected	Republican	Karen D. Beyer	9,901	53.3
131	Republican	Karen D. Beyer	re-elected	Democratic	Linda J. Minger	8,689	46.7
132	Democratic	Jennifer Mann	re-elected	Democratic	Jennifer L. Mann	9,507	79.2
132	Democratic	Jennifer Mann	re-elected	Republican	Eddie Tiburcio	2,502	20.8
133	Democratic	T.J. Rooney	retired	Democratic	Joseph F. Brennan	8,482	65.5
133	Democratic	T.J. Rooney	retired	Republican	Dawn M. Berrigan	3,986	30.8
133	Democratic	T.J. Rooney	retired	Green	Guy M. Gray	472	3.6
134	Republican	Douglas G. Reichley	re-elected	Republican	Douglas G. Reichley	15,000	60.4
134	Republican	Douglas G. Reichley	re-elected	Democratic	Christopher T. Casey	9,854	39.6
135	Democratic	Steve Samuelson	re-elected	Democratic	Steve Samuelson	14,828	100
136	Democratic	Robert Freeman	re-elected	Democratic	Robert Freeman	12,735	100
137	Democratic	Richard T. Grucela	re-elected	Democratic	Richard T. Grucela	17,385	100
138	Republican	Craig A. Dally	re-elected	Republican	Craig A. Dally	17,529	100
139	Republican	Jerry Birmelin	retired	Republican	Michael Peifer	14,069	100
140	Democratic	Thomas C. Corrigan	retired	Democratic	John Galloway	13,270	71.5
140	Democratic	Thomas C. Corrigan	retired	Republican	Joseph V. Montone	5,296	28.5
141	Democratic	Anthony J. Melio	re-elected	Democratic	Anthony J. Melio	14,200	77.3
141	Democratic	Anthony J. Melio	re-elected	Republican	Joseph F. Hogan III	4,172	22.7
142	Republican	Matthew N. Wright	defeated	Democratic	Chris King	12,543	52.5
142	Republican	Matthew N. Wright	defeated	Republican	Matthew N. Wright	11,338	47.5
143	Republican	Chuck McIlhinney	ran for Senate	Republican	Marguerite Quinn	12,974	50.2
143	Republican	Chuck McIlhinney	ran for Senate	Democratic	Larry W. Glick	11,147	43.1
143	Republican	Chuck McIlhinney	ran for Senate	Independent	Tom Lingenfelter	1,716	6.6
144	Republican	Katharine M. Watson	re-elected	Republican	Katharine M. Watson	14,838	60.1
144	Republican	Katharine M. Watson	re-elected	Democratic	James J. Trimble	9,833	39.9
145	Republican	Paul Clymer	re-elected	Republican	Paul Clymer	13,314	60.6
145	Republican	Paul Clymer	re-elected	Democratic	John Norvaisas	7,911	36.0
145	Republican	Paul Clymer	re-elected	Independent	John Ryan	754	3.4
146	Republican	Tom Quigley	re-elected	Republican	Tom Quigley	11,193	57.7
146	Republican	Tom Quigley	re-elected	Democratic	PJ McGill	8,220	42.3
147	Republican	Raymond Bunt	retired	Republican	Bob Mensch	11,762	55.8
147	Republican	Raymond Bunt	retired	Democratic	Roger E. Buchanan	9,330	44.2
148	Democratic	Mike Gerber	re-elected	Democratic	Mike Gerber	18,828	67.5
148	Democratic	Mike Gerber	re-elected	Republican	Tom Gale	9,071	32.5
149	Democratic	Daylin Leach	re-elected	Democratic	Daylin Leach	16,582	67.0
149	Democratic	Daylin Leach	re-elected	Republican	Monica A. Treichel	8,175	33.0
150	Republican	Jacqueline R. Crahalla	retired	Republican	Mike Vereb	11,073	52.2
150	Republican	Jacqueline R. Crahalla	retired	Democratic	Olivia Brady	10,127	47.8
151	Republican	Eugene F. McGill	defeated	Democratic	Rick Taylor	12,837	54.6
151	Republican	Eugene F. McGill	defeated	Republican	Eugene F. McGill	10,688	45.4
152	Republican	Susan E. Cornell	defeated in primary	Republican	Tom Murt	12,553	53.6
152	Republican	Susan E. Cornell	defeated in primary	Democratic	Michael J. Paston	10,861	46.4
153	Democratic	Josh Shapiro	re-elected	Democratic	Josh Shapiro	19,712	76.0
153	Democratic	Josh Shapiro	re-elected	Republican	Lou Guerra, Jr.	6,226	24.0
154	Democratic	Lawrence H. Curry	re-elected	Democratic	Lawrence H. Curry	21,068	78.1
154	Democratic	Lawrence H. Curry	re-elected	Republican	Bruce G. Anderson	5,919	21.9
155	Republican	Curt Schroder	re-elected	Republican	Curt Schroder	17,708	100
156	Republican	Elinor Z. Taylor	retired	Democratic	Barbara McIlvaine Smith	11,616	50.1
156	Republican	Elinor Z. Taylor	retired	Republican	Shannon E. Royer	11,588	49.9
157	Republican	Carole A. Rubley	re-elected	Republican	Carole A. Rubley	14,977	58.2
157	Republican	Carole A. Rubley	re-elected	Democratic	Richard J. Ciamacca	9,896	38.4
157	Republican	Carole A. Rubley	re-elected	Libertarian	James Babb	872	3.4
158	Republican	L. Chris Ross	re-elected	Republican	L. Chris Ross	15,066	64.3
158	Republican	L. Chris Ross	re-elected	Democratic	Mario J. Calvarese	8,351	35.7
159	Democratic	Thaddeus Kirkland	re-elected	Democratic	Thaddeus Kirkland	8,490	67.8
159	Democratic	Thaddeus Kirkland	re-elected	Republican	Baltazar E. Rubio	4,034	32.2
160	Republican	Stephen E. Barrar	re-elected	Republican	Stephen E. Barrar	17,239	63.8
160	Republican	Stephen E. Barrar	re-elected	Democratic	Shawn C. Diggory	9,789	36.2
161	Republican	Tom Gannon	defeated	Democratic	Bryan Lentz	14,345	51.5
161	Republican	Tom Gannon	defeated	Republican	Tom Gannon	13,525	48.5
162	Republican	Ron Raymond	re-elected	Republican	Ron Raymond	12,539	61.9
162	Republican	Ron Raymond	re-elected	Democratic	Marilyn Woodman	7,720	38.1
163	Republican	Nicholas A. Micozzie	re-elected	Republican	Nicholas A. Micozzie	12,905	57.2
163	Republican	Nicholas A. Micozzie	re-elected	Democratic	Marie Deyoung	9,656	42.8
164	Republican	Mario J. Civera	re-elected	Republican	Mario J. Civera	10,646	57.1
164	Republican	Mario J. Civera	re-elected	Democratic	Casey R. Roncaglione	7,988	42.9
165	Republican	William F. Adolph	re-elected	Republican	William F. Adolph	14,896	58.7
165	Republican	William F. Adolph	re-elected	Democratic	Larry Healy	9,781	38.5
166	Democratic	Greg Vitali	re-elected	Democratic	Greg Vitali	18,626	66.8
166	Democratic	Greg Vitali	re-elected	Republican	John P. Williamson	9,238	33.2
167	Republican	Bob Flick	retired	Republican	Duane Milne	13,556	50.3
167	Republican	Bob Flick	retired	Democratic	Anne R. Crowley	13,412	49.7
168	Republican	Thomas H. Killion	re-elected	Republican	Thomas H. Killion	16,163	58.7
168	Republican	Thomas H. Killion	re-elected	Democratic	Fred Dewey	11,373	41.3
169	Republican	Dennis M. O'Brien	re-elected	Republican	Dennis M. O'Brien	12,997	100
170	Republican	George T. Kenney	re-elected	Republican	George T. Kenney	10,924	54.1
170	Republican	George T. Kenney	re-elected	Democratic	Brendan F. Boyle	9,261	45.9
171	Republican	Kerry A. Benninghoff	re-elected	Republican	Kerry A. Benninghoff	14,656	100
172	Republican	John M. Perzel	re-elected	Republican	John M. Perzel	14,594	68.4
172	Republican	John M. Perzel	re-elected	Democratic	Tim Kearney	6,406	31.6
173	Democratic	Michael Patrick McGeehan	re-elected	Democratic	Michael Patrick McGeehan	11,338	75.8
173	Democratic	Michael Patrick McGeehan	re-elected	Republican	Reynolds Baldwin	3,619	24.2
174	Democratic	John P. Sabatina	re-elected	Democratic	John P. Sabatina	12,736	93.3
174	Democratic	John P. Sabatina	re-elected	Green	Traci Confer	914	6.7
175	Democratic	Marie Lederer	retired	Democratic	Michael H. O'Brien	13,983	84.1
175	Democratic	Marie Lederer	retired	Republican	Patricia Dempsey	2,648	15.9
176	Republican	Mario M. Scavello	re-elected	Republican	Mario M. Scavello	8,891	61.8
176	Republican	Mario M. Scavello	re-elected	Democratic	Bernard F. Kennedy	5,506	38.2
177	Republican	John J. Taylor	re-elected	Republican	John J. Taylor	10,269	66.3
177	Republican	John J. Taylor	re-elected	Democratic	Harry L. Enggasser	5,222	33.7
178	Republican	Scott Petri	re-elected	Republican	Scott Petri	15,415	59.4
178	Republican	Scott Petri	re-elected	Democratic	Marion E. Leszczynski	10,523	40.6
179	Democratic	William W. Rieger	retired	Democratic	Tony J. Payton	9,344	88.3
179	Democratic	William W. Rieger	retired	Republican	Troy L. Bouie	1,234	11.7
180	Democratic	Angel L. Cruz	re-elected	Democratic	Angel Cruz	8,846	91.9
180	Democratic	Angel L. Cruz	re-elected	Republican	Charles B. Reynolds	776	8.1
181	Democratic	W. Curtis Thomas	re-elected	Democratic	W. Curtis Thomas	13,435	100
182	Democratic	Babette Josephs	re-elected	Democratic	Babette Josephs	17,239	82.1
182	Democratic	Babette Josephs	re-elected	Republican	A. Lindsay Doering	3,767	17.9
183	Republican	Julie Harhart	re-elected	Republican	Julie Harhart	12,126	61.4
183	Republican	Julie Harhart	re-elected	Democratic	Russ Shade	7,131	36.1
184	Democratic	William F. Keller	re-elected	Democratic	William F. Keller	13,674	84.4
184	Democratic	William F. Keller	re-elected	Republican	Robert A. Mannino	2,530	15.6
185	Democratic	Robert C. Donatucci	re-elected	Democratic	Robert C. Donatucci	12,520	83.5
185	Democratic	Robert C. Donatucci	re-elected	Republican	Gregory Gentile	2,468	16.5
186	Democratic	Harold James	re-elected	Democratic	Harold James	14,214	100
187	Republican	Paul W. Semmel	defeated in primary	Republican	Carl W. Mantz	10,217	50.7
187	Republican	Paul W. Semmel	defeated in primary	Democratic	Archie Follweiler, Jr.	9,937	49.3
188	Democratic	James R. Roebuck	re-elected	Democratic	James R. Roebuck	12,047	86.1
188	Democratic	James R. Roebuck	re-elected	Green	Mike Rosenberg	1,953	14.0
189	Democratic	John Siptroth	re-elected	Democratic	John Siptroth	8,494	54.3
189	Democratic	John Siptroth	re-elected	Republican	Donna M. Asure	7,159	45.7
190	Democratic	Thomas W. Blackwell IV	re-elected	Democratic	Thomas W. Blackwell	15,446	97.5
190	Democratic	Thomas W. Blackwell IV	re-elected	Republican	Westley D. Ames	397	2.5
191	Democratic	Ronald G. Waters	re-elected	Democratic	Ronald G. Waters	14,405	100
192	Democratic	Louise Bishop	re-elected	Democratic	Louise Bishop	16,882	100
193	Republican	Steven R. Nickol	re-elected	Republican	Steven R. Nickol	12,623	67.3
193	Republican	Steven R. Nickol	re-elected	Democratic	Bill Panebaker	5,428	28.9
193	Republican	Steven R. Nickol	re-elected	Green	Thomas J. Marti	702	3.7
194	Democratic	Kathy Manderino	re-elected	Democratic	Kathy Manderino	16,043	80.8
194	Democratic	Kathy Manderino	re-elected	Republican	Thomas Christopher Rolland	3,812	19.2
195	Democratic	Frank Oliver	re-elected	Democratic	Frank L. Oliver	16,149	100
196	Republican	Beverly Mackereth	re-elected	Republican	Beverly Mackereth	15,415	73.2
196	Republican	Beverly Mackereth	re-elected	Democratic	William J. Hansman	5,637	26.8
197	Democratic	Jewell Williams	re-elected	Democratic	Jewell Williams	15,287	100
198	Democratic	Rosita Youngblood	re-elected	Democratic	Rosita Youngblood	15,895	96.3
198	Democratic	Rosita Youngblood	re-elected	Socialist Workers	John Staggs	618	3.7
199	Republican	Will Gabig	re-elected	Republican	Will Gabig	11,076	56.1
199	Republican	Will Gabig	re-elected	Democratic	Bill Cobb	8,017	40.6
200	Democratic	Cherelle Parker	re-elected	Democratic	Cherelle Parker	21,244	100
201	Democratic	John Myers	re-elected	Democratic	John Myers	16,083	97.0
201	Democratic	John Myers	re-elected	Republican	Joseph L. Messa	502	3.0
202	Democratic	Mark B. Cohen	re-elected	Democratic	Mark B. Cohen	13,315	100
203	Democratic	Dwight E. Evans	re-elected	Democratic	Dwight E. Evans	15,853	100

== See also ==
- Pennsylvania Senate elections, 2006
