= William Pendleton =

William Pendleton may refer to:

- William N. Pendleton (1809–1883), American teacher, Episcopal priest, and soldier
- William Frederic Pendleton (1845–1927), first Executive Bishop of the General Church of the New Jerusalem
- William W. Pendleton, former Democratic member of the Pennsylvania House of Representatives
