= John Milliron =

American politician

John P. Milliron

Member of the Pennsylvania House of Representatives from the 79th district
- In office 1975–1978
- Preceded by: Denny Bixler
- Succeeded by: Richard Geist

Personal details
- Born: September 2, 1947 (age 78) Altoona, Pennsylvania
- Party: Democratic

John Patrick Milliron (born September 2, 1947) is a former Democratic member of the Pennsylvania House of Representatives.
