= Denny Bixler =

American politician

Denny J. Bixler

Member of the Pennsylvania House of Representatives from the 79th district
- In office 1969–1974
- Preceded by: District created
- Succeeded by: John Milliron

Personal details
- Born: November 1, 1940 Johnstown, Pennsylvania, U.S.
- Died: June 19, 1981 (aged 40) Altoona, Pennsylvania, U.S.
- Party: Democratic
- Education: University of Pittsburgh

Denny J. Bixler (November 1, 1940 – June 19, 1981) was an American politician who served as a Democratic member of the Pennsylvania House of Representatives.

Following his legislative career, he became a radio station owner and executive.

== Formative years and family ==
Born in Johnstown, Pennsylvania on November 1, 1940, Bixler attended the University of Pittsburgh. Married to Beverly (Bainbridge) Bixler, he was the father of two.

== Public service career ==
In 1968, Bixler was elected as a Democrat to the Pennsylvania House of Representative in a Special Election, and represented Blair County. He was reelected and served three additional terms. In 1974, he ran for a seat in the Pennsylvania State Senate, but was defeated by Robert Jubelirer.

== Radio career ==
Following his departure from the Pennsylvania Legislature, Bixler became the owner and general manager of WVAM Radio in Altoona. He subsequently became the general manager of WJAC Radio in Johnstown, Pennsylvania, after selling WVAM.

== Illness, death and interment ==
Bixler died from cancer-related complications at the Altoona Hospital (now UPMC Altoona) in Altoona, Pennsylvania on June 19, 1981.
