= Mario Cattabiani =

American journalist

Mario F. Cattabiani
- Occupation: Journalist
- Notable credit: Philadelphia Inquirer
- Awards: Ralph Vigoda Award of Excellence

Mario F. Cattabiani was a journalist for The Philadelphia Inquirer.

In 2004, he won the Ralph Vigoda Award of Excellence for March in which he continued his coverage of Peco Energy Co.’s two secret deals to donate $17 million to a nonprofit group run by aides to then-state Sen. Vince Fumo, and he wrote several stories on “ghost voting” by legislators, which prompted an investigation of the practice by the state House Ethics Committee.

In 2005, he won second place in The Society of Professional Journalists Spotlight Award for his coverage on ghost voting in the PA Legislature.

In 2005, he was named one of "Pennsylvania's Most Influential Reporters" by the Pennsylvania political news website PoliticsPA. In 2008, the political website PolitickerPA.com named him one of the "Most Powerful Political Reporters" in Pennsylvania. He was criticized by the Philadelphia City Paper, a former alternate weekly newspaper, for writing an "unethical" front-page article about Sen. Daylin Leach, who had criticized Cattabiani's reporting. However, following Cattabiani's story detailing Leach's blog that mixed political satire with amateur sketch-comedy bits heavy on sexual jokes, Leach ended his online postings.

In 2002, the political website PoliticsPA called Cattabiani the "Worst Capitol Correspondent" when he worked at The Morning Call, saying that he had "compromised his respect as a journalist" by writing sensationalized articles that "seem better suited for the tabloids."
