= Ryan Mackenzie =

American politician (born 1982)

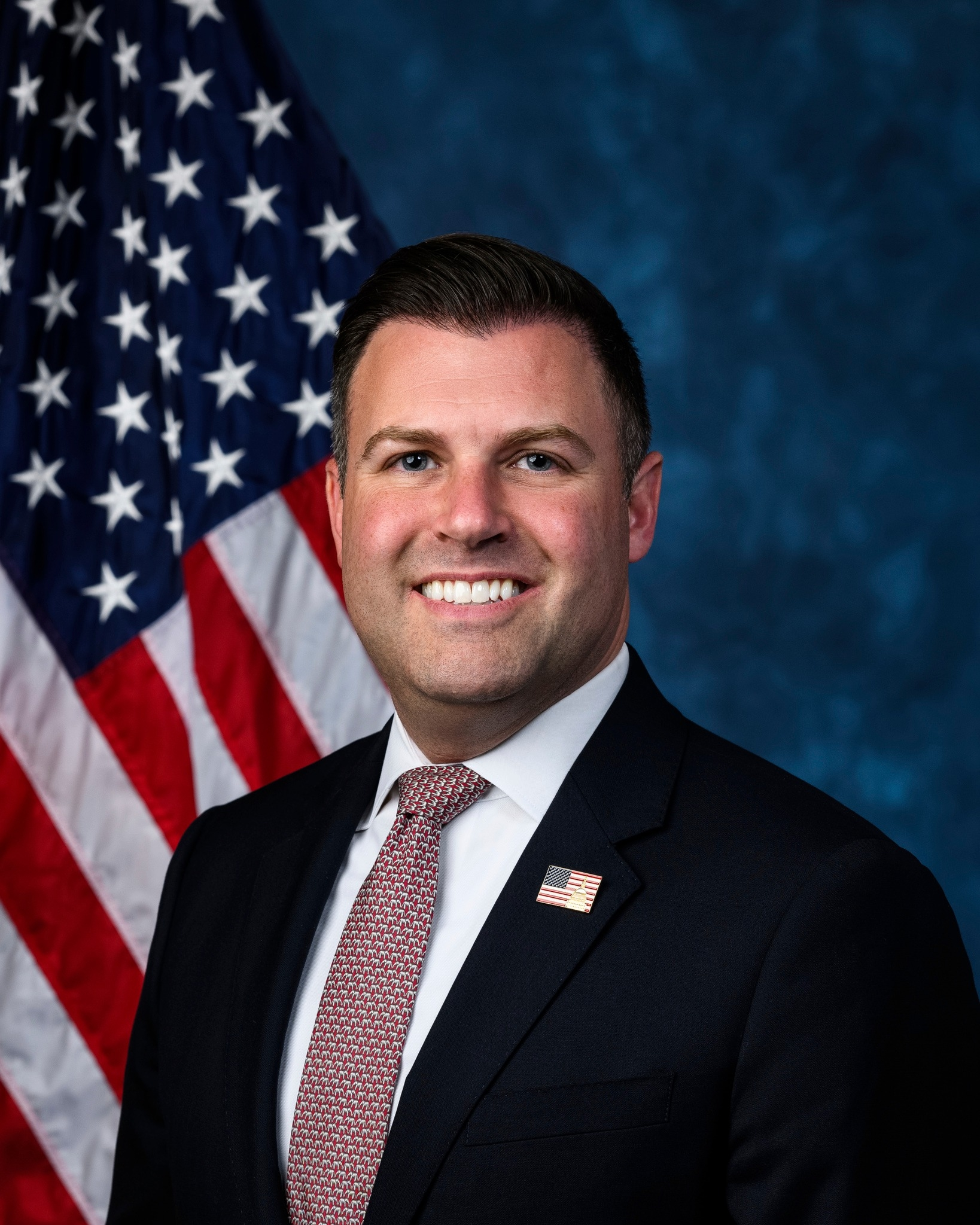
- Official portrait, 2024

Member of the U.S. House of Representatives from Pennsylvania's 7th district
- Incumbent
- Assumed office January 3, 2025
- Preceded by: Susan Wild

Member of the Pennsylvania House of Representatives
- In office May 8, 2012 – November 30, 2024
- Preceded by: Doug Reichley
- Succeeded by: Gary Day
- Constituency: 134th district (2012–2022); 187th district (2023–2024)

Personal details
- Born: Ryan Edward Mackenzie; August 3, 1982 (age 44) Allentown, Pennsylvania, U.S.
- Party: Republican
- Spouse: Chloe Mackenzie
- Children: 2
- Relatives: Milou Mackenzie (mother)
- Education: New York University (BS); Harvard University (MBA)
- Website: House website Campaign website

Ryan Edward Mackenzie (born August 3, 1982) is an American politician serving as the U.S. representative from Pennsylvania's 7th congressional district since 2025. A member of the Republican Party, he served in the Pennsylvania House of Representatives from 2012 to 2024. Before redistricting, he represented the 134th district until his final term, when he was moved to the 187th district.

His mother is Milou Mackenzie, who is a Lehigh Valley-area Republican state representative for the 131st district. They were the first mother-son pair to simultaneously serve in the Pennsylvania House of Representatives.

Mackenzie was elected to represent Pennsylvania's 7th congressional district in 2024, defeating incumbent Democrat Susan Wild. He was endorsed by President Donald Trump in the 2026 election, which he lost to firefighter Bob Brooks.

== Early life and education ==
Mackenzie was born on August 3, 1982, in Allentown, Pennsylvania, the son of Charles and Milou Mackenzie. He graduated from Parkland High School in 2000 and from New York University with a Bachelor of Science degree in finance and international business in 2004. He obtained an Master of Business Administration from the Harvard Business School in 2010.

== Pennsylvania House of Representatives ==
In 2012, Mackenzie was elected to represent District 134 in the Pennsylvania House of Representatives. After redistricting, he ran for and won the District 187 seat in 2022.

In 2020, Mackenzie was among more than 60 Pennsylvania House Republicans who urged Congress to reject and decertify Pennsylvania's electoral votes in the 2020 presidential election.

== U.S. House of Representatives ==
=== Elections ===
==== 2018 ====
In 2017, Mackenzie announced his candidacy for the United States House of Representatives in Pennsylvania's 15th congressional district in 2018. He withdrew from the race in March 2018 when the state Supreme Court created new district lines.

==== 2022 ====
In 2021, Mackenzie briefly ran for the Republican nomination for Pennsylvania's 7th congressional district. He withdrew from the race, instead opting to run for reelection to the Pennsylvania House of Representatives.

==== 2024 ====
In July 2023, Mackenzie again announced his candidacy for Pennsylvania's 7th congressional district, this time for the 2024 election. During his campaign, he called the issue of immigration a "top priority." Mackenzie also voiced support for the Gaza war, but opposed further aid to Ukraine amid the continuing Russian invasion.

On April 23, 2024, Mackenzie won the Republican nomination for the seat, defeating Kevin Dellicker (who also ran in 2022) and Maria Montero. In August 2024, Donald Trump endorsed Mackenzie. In the general election, Mackenzie defeated incumbent Democrat Susan Wild.

==== 2026 ====
Mackenzie ran for re-election in 2026 and was defeated by Democrat Bob Brooks in the general election after running unopposed in the Republican primary.

=== Tenure ===
Mackenzie was sworn in to the 119th Congress on January 3, 2025.

=== Committee assignments ===
For the 119th Congress:

- Committee on Education and Workforce
  - Subcommittee on Early Childhood, Elementary, and Secondary Education
  - Subcommittee on Health, Employment, Labor, and Pensions
  - Subcommittee on Workforce Protections (Chair)
- Committee on Foreign Affairs
  - Subcommittee on East Asia and the Pacific
  - Subcommittee on Western Hemisphere
- Committee on Homeland Security
  - Subcommittee on Counterterrorism and Intelligence
  - Subcommittee on Emergency Management and Technology

== Electoral history ==
House of Representatives District 134 Special Election Results (2012)
Party	Candidate	Votes	%
Republican	Ryan Mackenzie	6,057	59.9
Democratic	Patrick Slattery	4,052	40.1
Total votes		10,109	100.0

House of Representatives District 134 Republican Primary Results (2012)
Party	Candidate	Votes	%
Republican	Ryan Mackenzie	5,475	86.2
Republican	Arlene Dabrow	876	13.8
Total votes		6,351	100.0

House of Representatives District 134 General Results (2012)
Party	Candidate	Votes	%
Republican	Ryan Mackenzie (incumbent)	22,360	59.6
Democratic	John Reynard	15,159	40.4
Total votes		37,519	100.0

House of Representatives District 134 General Results (2014)
Party	Candidate	Votes	%
Republican	Ryan Mackenzie (incumbent)	14,448	100.0
Total votes		14,448	100.0

House of Representatives District 134 General Results (2016)
Party	Candidate	Votes	%
Republican	Ryan Mackenzie (incumbent)	25,676	100.0
Total votes		25,676	100.0

House of Representatives District 134 Republican Primary Results (2018)
Party	Candidate	Votes	%
Republican	Ryan Mackenzie (incumbent)	3,347	71.2
Republican	Ronald Beitler	1,351	28.8
Total votes		4,698	100.0

House of Representatives District 134 General Results (2018)
Party	Candidate	Votes	%
Republican	Ryan Mackenzie (incumbent)	16,237	57.3
Democratic	Thomas Applebach	12,107	42.7
Total votes		28,344	100.0

House of Representatives District 134 General Results (2020)
Party	Candidate	Votes	%
Republican	Ryan Mackenzie (incumbent)	21,532	61.7
Democratic	Marc Basist	13,388	38.3
Total votes		39,103	100.0

House of Representatives District 187 Primary Results (2022)
Party	Candidate	Votes	%
Republican	Ryan Mackenzie (incumbent)	5,625	61.3
Republican	Gary Day (incumbent)	3,548	38.7
Total votes		11,990	100.0

House of Representatives District 187 General Results (2022)
Party	Candidate	Votes	%
Republican	Ryan Mackenzie (incumbent)	22,990	100.0
Total votes		22,990	100.0

Pennsylvania's 7th Congressional District Republican Primary Results (2024)
Party	Candidate	Votes	%
Republican	Ryan Mackenzie	23,554	42.6
Republican	Kevin Dellicker	18,829	34.0
Republican	Maria Montero	12,946	23.4
Total votes		55,329	100.0

2024 Pennsylvania's 7th congressional district election
Party	Candidate	Votes	%
Republican	Ryan Mackenzie	203,688	50.5
Democratic	Susan Wild (incumbent)	199,626	49.5
Total votes		403,314	100.0

U.S. House of Representatives
Preceded by Susan Wild	Member of the U.S. House of Representatives from Pennsylvania's 7th congressional district 2025–present	Incumbent
U.S. order of precedence (ceremonial)
Preceded by Sam Liccardo	United States representatives by seniority 397th	Succeeded by John Mannion
