= Christopher J. King =

American politician

Member of the Pennsylvania House of Representatives from the 142nd district
- In office January 2, 2007 – November 30, 2008
- Preceded by: Matt Wright
- Succeeded by: Frank Farry

Personal details
- Party: Democratic
- Profession: Educator, analyst

Christopher J. King is a Democratic politician, who represented Pennsylvania's 142nd Representative District in the Pennsylvania House of Representatives from 2007 to 2008.

King grew up in Middletown Township, Bucks County. King is a graduate of Neshaminy High School and Millersville University.

In 2002, King entered the race for state representative only three months before the general election, as a late replacement for the Democratic candidate who withdrew. Against incumbent Matt Wright, King took 41% of the vote in the loss.

In 2006, King made a second run at the state house. In the primary election, he defeated Democrat Larry Lefkowitz with more than two-thirds of the total vote. This time, with many incumbents hobbled by the fallout of the 2005 legislative pay raise, King defeated Wright, taking 52.5% of the vote.

In 2008, he was defeated for re-election by Republican Frank Farry.
