= Wallis Brooks =

American politician

Wallis W. Brooks

Member of the Pennsylvania House of Representatives from the 149th district
- In office February 27, 2002 – November 30, 2002
- Preceded by: Constance Williams
- Succeeded by: Daylin Leach

Personal details
- Party: Republican
- Education: American University; Dickinson School of Law

Wallis W. Brooks is a former Republican member of the Pennsylvania House of Representatives. She graduated from American University with a degree in English in 1969. She earned a law degree from the Dickinson School of Law, and was admitted to the Pennsylvania bar in 1973.

== Election history ==
Pennsylvania House of Representatives, 149th district
Year	Republican	Votes	Pct	Democrat	Votes	Pct
2002	Wallis Brooks (inc.)	10,556	47.4%	Daylin Leach	11,726	52.6%
2002 special election	Wallis Brooks	3,922	48.0%	Daylin Leach	3,616	44.2%
