= Donald Snyder =

American politician (1951–2023)

President of Lehigh Carbon Community College
- In office 2000 – December 31, 2013
- Succeeded by: Ann Bieber (Acting)

Member of the Pennsylvania House of Representatives from the 134th district
- In office January 6, 1981 – November 30, 2000
- Preceded by: Joseph Zeller
- Succeeded by: Jane Baker

Personal details
- Born: December 24, 1951 Greenawalds, South Whitehall Township, Pennsylvania, U.S.
- Died: March 4, 2023 (aged 71) Orefield, Pennsylvania, U.S.
- Party: Republican
- Spouse: Nancy A. Schelly
- Children: 2
- Education: Lehigh County Community College (A.A.); Pennsylvania State University (B.A.); Lehigh University (M.B.A.); Villanova University School of Law (J.D.); Dickinson School of Law (LL.M.)

Donald William Snyder (December 24, 1951 – March 4, 2023) was an American politician who represented the 134th district as a Republican in the Pennsylvania House of Representatives from 1981 until 2000.

== Early life and education ==
Snyder was born on December 24, 1951, in Greenawalds, South Whitehall Township, Pennsylvania. He graduated from Parkland High School in 1969. Snyder obtained an associate of arts degree from Lehigh County Community College in 1971 and a bachelor of arts degree from Pennsylvania State University in 1973. He earned a master of business administration from Lehigh University in 1976. Snyder received his juris doctor degree from Villanova University School of Law in 1981 and his master of laws from Dickinson School of Law in 1989.

== Career ==
In 1980, Snyder was elected as a Republican member of the Pennsylvania House of Representatives, representing the 134th district. He had previously served on the planning commission of South Whitehall Township. Snyder was reelected to nine consecutive terms. During his final two terms, he served as majority whip. The term prior saw Snyder serve as majority policy chairman. In 2000, Snyder was chosen as president of Lehigh Carbon Community College. He retired from the position on December 31, 2013, after being diagnosed with cancer.

== Personal life and death ==
Snyder died at his home in Orefield, Pennsylvania, on March 4, 2023, at the age of 71. He had been married to his wife Nancy A. Schelly for 46 years at the time of his death. The couple had two children.
