= Michael Diven =

American politician (1970–2020)

Michael B. Diven

Member of the Pennsylvania House of Representatives from the 22nd district
- In office January 2, 2001 – November 30, 2006
- Preceded by: Frank Gigliotti
- Succeeded by: Chelsa Wagner

Personal details
- Born: March 27, 1970 Pittsburgh, Pennsylvania
- Died: August 18, 2020 (aged 50) Mount Lebanon, Pennsylvania
- Party: Democratic (before 2005; 2009); Republican (2005–2009)
- Education: Duquesne University (BA)

Michael Bernard Diven (March 27, 1970 – August 18, 2020) was an American politician who served as a member of the Pennsylvania House of Representatives for the 22nd District. He was defeated in 2006.

== Early life and education ==
Diven was born, on March 27, 1970, in Pittsburgh, Pennsylvania, the son of Joey Diven, a police officer and famed local boxer. Diven earned a Bachelor of Arts degree from Duquesne University in 1993.

== Career ==
After graduating from college, Diven served as a staff assistant to Allegheny County Commissioner Tom Foerster from 1993 through 1996. In 1997, he was elected to represent 4th district of the Pittsburgh City Council at the age of 27, which made him the youngest person elected to that body at that time.

At various times, he served as a member of the Brookline Area Community Council, as chairman of the Pittsburgh Public Safety Services committee, and on the board of the Penn State Allegheny County Cooperative Extension. He co-founded the Police and Communities Together (PACT) organization and served as president of the South Pittsburgh Housing Task Force. He served on the board of the Allegheny County Sanitary Authority (Alcosan) until he was removed from the board in 2008 by Pittsburgh Mayor Luke Ravenstahl.

Diven won election to the Pennsylvania House of Representatives in November 2000, following the resignation of Frank Gigliotti, who was convicted of soliciting bribes. During his tenure, Diven clashed with Jack Wagner, Bill DeWeese and the leadership of the House Democratic Caucus, who later backed Richard A. Nerone's unsuccessful primary challenge in 2004.

Citing the primary challenge and frustrated by the leadership's reluctance to pursue some of his agenda, including making health care benefits less expensive for school districts, Diven became a Republican in January 2005. After he switched parties, the Democratic caucus fired his staff and cut the office phone lines. That April, he unsuccessfully ran for the Pennsylvania Senate seat left vacant by Jack Wagner's 2004 election as Pennsylvania Auditor General, in a race that included Mark Rauterkus (Libertarian), ultimately losing to Wagner-ally Wayne Fontana.

In 2006, Diven was defeated by Jack Wagner's niece, Chelsa Wagner. Diven returned to the Democratic party to run for District Justice in Pittsburgh in 2009, where he faced and lost to his former employee and successor in Pittsburgh City Council, Jim Motznik.

== Death ==
Diven died in August 2020, aged 50.

== Election history ==
Pennsylvania Senate, 42nd district, Special election
Year	Democrat	Votes	Pct	Republican	Votes	Pct			
2005	Wayne Fontana	19,834	55.5	Michael Diven	13,353	37.4	Mark Rauterkus	2,542	7.1

Pennsylvania House of Representatives, 22nd district
Year	Democrat	Votes	Pct	Republican	Votes	Pct
2006	Chelsa Wagner	12,207	55.3	Michael Diven	9,849	44.7
2004	Michael Diven	21,481	100.0			
2002	Michael Diven	12,548	70.2	Glenn P. Nagy	5,321	29.8
2000	Michael Diven	15,047	78.2	Harry T. Lewellen	4,196	21.8
