= Jane S. Baker =

American politician (born 1945)

Member of the Pennsylvania House of Representatives from the 134th district
- In office January 2, 2001 – November 30, 2002
- Preceded by: Donald Snyder
- Succeeded by: Doug Reichley

Personal details
- Born: July 8, 1945 (age 81) Kansas City, Missouri
- Party: Republican
- Spouse: James
- Education: Cedar Crest College

Jane S. Baker (born July 8, 1945) is a former Republican member of the Pennsylvania House of Representatives.

She attended Penn State University from 1963 to 1965 and graduated from Cedar Crest College in 1967. She was first elected in 2000 and served one term before her retirement in 2002.
