= Matthew H. Smith =

American politician (born 1972)

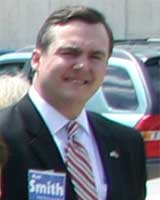

Member of the Pennsylvania Senate from the 37th district
- In office January 1, 2013 – June 2015
- Preceded by: John Pippy
- Succeeded by: Guy Reschenthaler
- Constituency: Parts of Allegheny and Washington Counties

Member of the Pennsylvania House of Representatives from the 42nd district
- In office January 2, 2007 – December 8, 2012
- Preceded by: Thomas Stevenson
- Succeeded by: Dan Miller

Personal details
- Born: Matthew Heyden Smith; September 19, 1972 (age 54) Bethel Park, Pennsylvania
- Party: Democratic
- Spouse: Eileen Smith
- Children: 3
- Education: Rollins College; Duquesne Law School
- Profession: Lawyer

Matthew Heyden "Matt" Smith (born September 19, 1972 in Bethel Park, Pennsylvania) is an American politician. He served as a member of the Pennsylvania State Senate, representing the 37th district from January 2013 until June 2015. A member of the Democratic Party, he also served in the Pennsylvania House of Representatives from 2007 to 2012. He was elected to the State Senate in the 2012 election.

== Biography ==
Smith is the son of James and Janice Smith, who also were born and raised in Mt. Lebanon, Pennsylvania. Smith is a graduate of Rollins College at Winter Park, Florida with a degree in history. He graduated from the Duquesne University School of Law with honors in 1999. He lives in Mt. Lebanon, Pennsylvania with his wife, Eileen Smith. Prior to elective office, Smith worked for Babst, Calland, Clements and Zomnir, P.C.

Smith was elected to the Pennsylvania House of Representatives in 2006, defeating 21-year-old Republican Mark Harris, who had defeated incumbent Tom Stevenson in the Republican primary.

Smith was elected to the Pennsylvania State Senate in 2012, defeating Republican opponent Dakshinamurthy "D." Raja. Raja spent $5 million on his campaign, while Smith spent only $1 million.

Pennsylvania Senate minority leader Jay Costa announced in May 2015 that Smith would be stepping down from the Senate, effective in June 2015, to become President of the Greater Pittsburgh Chamber of Commerce.

== Electoral history ==
Pennsylvania House of Representatives: Results 2006–2010
Year	Republican	Votes	Pct	Democrat	Votes	Pct
2006	Mark Harris	11,795	41.6%	Matt Smith	16,568	58.4%
2008	Jim Blazeck	12,139	34.6%	Matt Smith	22,919	65.4%
2010	Sue Means	10,591	40.2%	Matt Smith	15,740	59.8%

Pennsylvania State Senate: Results 2012
Year	Republican	Votes	Pct	Democrat	Votes	Pct
2012	D. Raja	59,626	47.3%	Matt Smith	66,467	52.7%
