= James L. Wright =

American politician

James L. Wright, Jr.

Member of the Pennsylvania House of Representatives from the 142nd district
- In office 1965–1990
- Preceded by: District created
- Succeeded by: Matthew N. Wright

Member of the Pennsylvania House of Representatives from the Bucks County district
- In office 1965–1968

Personal details
- Born: March 10, 1925 New York City, New York
- Died: October 16, 1990 (aged 65) Newtown, Pennsylvania
- Party: Republican

James L. Wright, Jr. (March 10, 1925 – October 16, 1990) was a Republican member of the Pennsylvania House of Representatives. He is a native of New York City. He represented the 142nd legislative district in the Pennsylvania House of Representatives from 1965 to 1990. He is the father of Matthew N. Wright, who succeeded him in representing the 142nd district.

Wright died at a hospice in 1990.
