= Chelsa Wagner =

American politician (born 1977)

Allegheny County Controller
- In office January 2, 2012 – Jan 3, 2022
- Preceded by: Mark Flaherty
- Succeeded by: Corey O'Connor

Member of the Pennsylvania House of Representatives from the 22nd district
- In office January 2, 2007 – January 2, 2012
- Preceded by: Michael Diven
- Succeeded by: Martin Schmotzer

Personal details
- Born: July 24, 1977 (age 49) Pittsburgh, Pennsylvania
- Party: Democratic
- Spouse: Khari Mosley
- Children: 2
- Relatives: Jack Wagner (uncle)
- Education: University of Chicago (BA); University of Pittsburgh (JD)
- Occupation: Attorney

Chelsa L. Wagner (born July 24, 1977) is an American jurist, currently serving as a Trial Court Judge in the Civil Division of the Allegheny County Court of Common Pleas in the Commonwealth of Pennsylvania.

Wagner previously served for ten years as the Allegheny County Controller and five years as Pennsylvania State Representative for the 22nd Legislative District.

In the Pennsylvania House of Representatives her district included the South Side and part of the North Side of the city of Pittsburgh, and parts of the suburbs of Baldwin, Whitehall and Castle Shannon. She resigned from the House in late 2011 after being elected Controller. As Controller, she completed nearly three terms, resigning after she was elected as an Allegheny County Court of Common Pleas Judge in November 2021. She assumed the position on January 3, 2022.

== Early life and education ==
Born in Pittsburgh, Wagner is a member of a prominent political family in Pittsburgh. Her father Pete was Democratic Chairman of the city's 19th Ward for 30 years, and her uncle Jack Wagner served as the state's Auditor General. Wagner graduated from Seton-La Salle Catholic High School in Mt. Lebanon, Pennsylvania, and then the University of Chicago, where she played on the women's basketball team. Wagner earned a Juris Doctor from the University of Pittsburgh School of Law.

== Career ==
After graduating from law school, Wagner joined a law firm in Pittsburgh, specializing in medical malpractice cases and other litigation.

=== Pennsylvania State Representative ===
Wagner was first elected to the Pennsylvania State House of Representatives, 22nd Legislative District in 2006 with over 55% of the vote. Her election marked the first time ever that a woman was elected to a full term in the State House representing the City of Pittsburgh. In 2009, Wagner became the first Democratic legislator in Pennsylvania history to give birth while in office, and returned to Harrisburg with her 10-day-old son, Thaddeus, to attend to a months-long state budget impasse. Wagner served on the Judiciary, Education, Transportation and Urban Affairs committees. She served three terms, stepping down from the House when she was elected Allegheny County Controller.

=== Allegheny County Controller ===
Wagner is currently serving her second term as Allegheny County Controller. Wagner took office in 2012 as the first woman to hold the office and oversaw Allegheny County's annual expenditures of over $1 billion. Wagner made her office the first in Allegheny County government to provide paid family leave, an example which was followed by the County administration and the City of Pittsburgh, and instituted a $15 per hour minimum wage for her employees. Wagner modernized her office's auditing functions to meet the highest professional standards and implemented technological improvements.

As Controller, she led efforts to bring transparency and accountability to municipal authorities, tax-exempt "purely public charities", and water quality.

She was named a Governing Magazine 2017 Women In Government Leadership honoree, joining the third cohort of twenty-five members, selected from over 100,000 women holding elected office nationally.

==== Pittsburgh Marathon ====
Wagner helped resurrect the Pittsburgh Marathon from a five-year hiatus to become a world-class event that also promotes health in local schools and communities. She served on the board of the Pittsburgh Marathon from 2009 to 2019.

== Electoral history ==
=== 2006 ===
Wagner challenged incumbent Republican State Representative Michael Diven in the 2006 general election to serve the 22nd State House District which included parts of the South Side and North Side of the City of Pittsburgh, as well as parts of the suburbs of Baldwin, Whitehall, and Castle Shannon. Diven, who was elected as a Democrat in 2004, had held the seat for three terms but changed his political party affiliation to Republican a year later and got on the ballot in 2006 through a write-in effort. Wagner won the election with 55% of the vote.

=== 2008 ===
Wagner was unopposed for re-election in 2008.

=== 2010 ===
Wagner was unopposed for re-election in 2010.

=== 2011 ===
Wagner ran for Allegheny County Controller in 2011 and faced Valerie McDonald Roberts and George Matta in the Democratic primary on May 17, 2011. She received 49% of the vote to McDonald Roberts' 28% and Matta's 23%. She faced Republican Robert Howard in the general election on November 8, 2011, and won with 61% of the vote.

=== 2015 ===
In the 2015 primary, Wagner ran for reelection against Mark Patrick Flaherty, who preceded her as controller. Although Flaherty had the backing of the local Democratic Party and outspent Wagner by a margin of 8:1, Wagner won the election 52% to 48%.

=== 2019 ===
Wagner was unopposed in the Democratic primary on May 21, 2019. She was reelected in the November 6, 2019, general election with over 63% of the vote against Republican Brooke Nadonley.

=== 2021 ===
Wagner was nominated to run for the judge position at Allegheny County Court of Common Pleas, and won on Nov 2, 2021, and she was sworn in the position in Jan 3, 2022, hence vacated the Allegheny County Controller position, which was later filled in on Jul 10, 2022, by Corey O'Connor, the former Pittsburgh city councilman and son of the late Pittsburgh mayor Bob O'Connor.

== Personal life ==
Wagner and her husband, Khari Mosley, reside with their two boys in the North Point Breeze neighborhood of Pittsburgh. Her husband is a member of Pittsburgh City Council.

=== Detroit hotel incident ===
On March 6, 2019, at the Westin Book Cadillac Hotel, Wagner was arrested and detained by the Detroit police as a result of the hotel staff's denying her husband, Khari Mosley, access to their hotel room. On March 8, 2019, the Detroit police issued a warrant to file assault and battery charges against Wagner. Wagner faced a felony count of resisting and obstructing police. Her husband, Mosley, faced a misdemeanor for disturbing the peace. On March 19, 2019, Wagner and Mosley sent notice of their intentions to sue the Westin Book Cadillac Hotel and Detroit police. The following day, on March 20, 2019, the Wayne County, Michigan Prosecutor's Office filed resisting and obstructing charges against Wagner and disturbing the peace charges against Mosley. Wagner and Mosley have characterized the charges against them as retaliatory and part of a cover-up by the Westin Book Cadillac Hotel and Detroit police.

Mosley was acquitted of all charges on July 15, 2019, after the jury deliberated for only 45 minutes.

On November 20, 2019, Wagner was also acquitted of the disturbing the peace charges and a mistrial was declared on the resisting and obstructing charge when the jury could not come to a unanimous decision. The jury was split with 9 jurors favoring acquittal and only 3 considering conviction.

On December 20, 2019, prosecutors in Wayne County said they'd retry Wagner on the felony count of assaulting, resisting and obstructing a police officer. The charges were later dismissed in August 2020. County Controller Pleads To Misdemeanor, Prosecutors Drop Felony In Detroit Incident. Wagner and Mosley filed suit against the Westin's parent company, Marriot, in federal court, resulting in a confidential settlement agreement filed in September 2024.
