= William W. Pendleton =

American politician

Member of the Pennsylvania House of Representatives from the 24th district
- In office January 6, 1981 – November 30, 1982
- Preceded by: Joseph Rhodes, Jr.
- Succeeded by: Joseph Preston, Jr.

Personal details
- Born: January 18, 1940 (age 86) Ford City, Pennsylvania
- Party: Democratic
- Children: 16

William Watkins Pendleton, Sr. (born January 18, 1940) is a former Democratic member of the Pennsylvania House of Representatives.
