= Thomas L. Stevenson =

American politician

Member of the Pennsylvania House of Representatives from the 42nd district
- In office January 7, 1997 – November 30, 2006
- Preceded by: Gregory Fajt
- Succeeded by: Matthew Smith

Personal details
- Party: Republican
- Spouse: Roberta
- Education: Pennsylvania State University; Western New England College School of Law

Thomas L. Stevenson is a former Republican member of the Pennsylvania House of Representatives, where he represented the 42nd legislative district from 1997 through 2006.

Stevenson served as chair of the House Ethics Committee. Stevenson's legislative accomplishments include the "hero scholarship bill", allowing children of firefighters, police, paramedics, and national guardsmen who are killed in the line of duty to attend certain Pennsylvania colleges for free. Additionally, he claimed that he increased funding for libraries, blocked suburbanites from having to pay a commuter tax to Pittsburgh, and provided tax credits to draw film production to the state.

He lost the 2006 primary election to Mark Harris, a 21-year-old college student. Stevenson was heavily criticized for his support for the 2005 legislative pay raise. During a negative campaign, Stevenson attacked his opponent as a political novice by airing television commercials depicting a tree house, "the only property Mr. Harris has ever owned."
