= Doug Reichley =

American politician

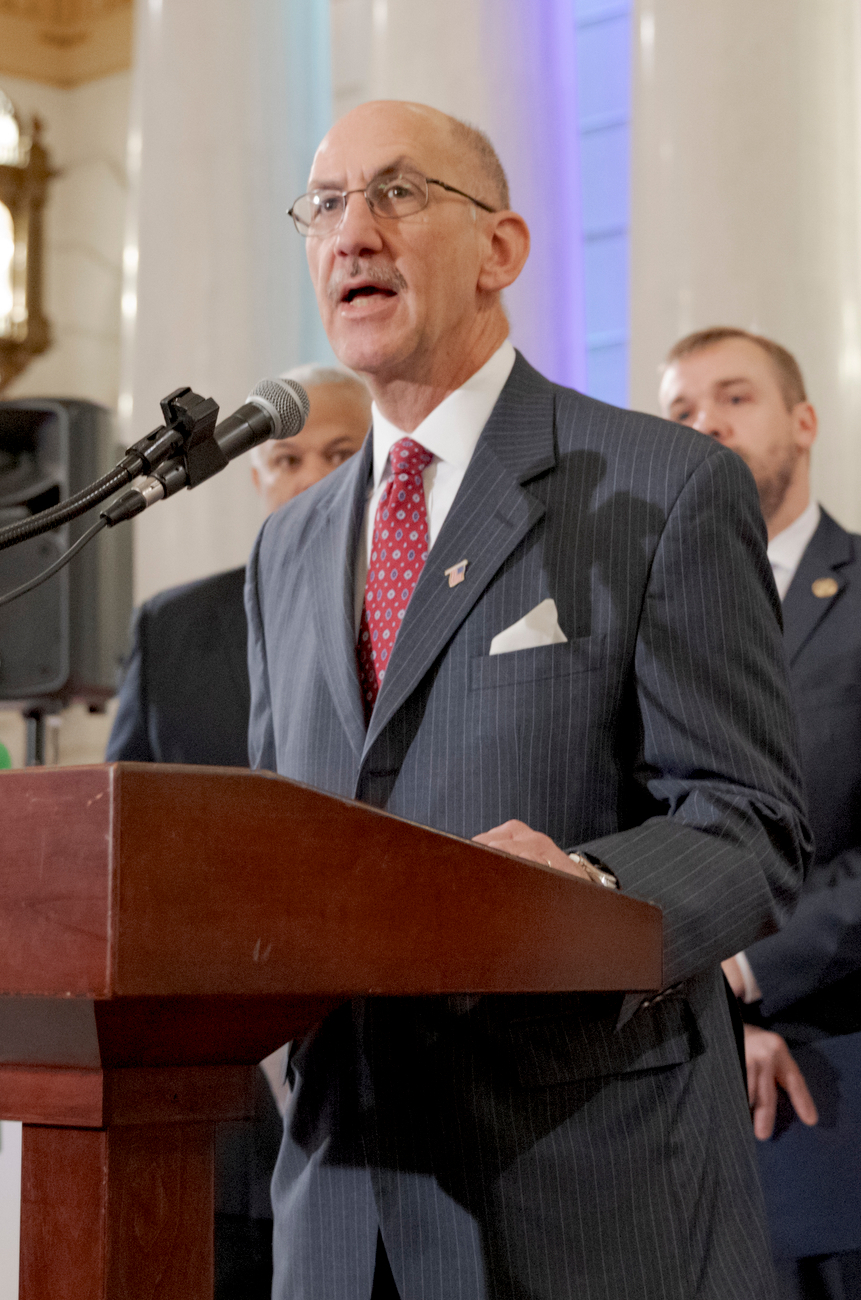

Judge of the Pennsylvania Court of Common Pleas for Lehigh County
- Incumbent
- Assumed office 2012

Member of the Pennsylvania House of Representatives from the 134th district
- In office January 7, 2003 – December 30, 2011
- Preceded by: Jane S. Baker
- Succeeded by: Ryan Mackenzie

Personal details
- Born: 1961 (age 64–65) Washington, D.C., U.S.
- Party: Republican
- Education: Lafayette College (BA); Penn State Dickinson Law (JD)
- Occupation: Attorney
- Website: http://repreichley.com

Douglas Reichley (born 1961) is a politician from the U.S. state of Pennsylvania; he was elected to the Pennsylvania House of Representatives in 2002, representing the 134th district. He sat on the House Appropriations, Consumer Affairs, Health and Human Services and Professional Licensure Committees and was also a member of the House Republican Policy Committee. In 2011, he was elected Judge on the Lehigh County Court of Common Pleas.

== Early life ==
Reichley was born in 1961 in Washington D.C. and graduated from the Thomas S. Wootton High School in 1979. Reichley graduated from Lafayette College as part of their class of 1983 with a Bachelor of Arts in government/law. He earned his Juris Doctor from Dickinson Law School in 1986.

Reichley worked as an associate attorney for Lightner Law Offices in Wescosville before being named Assistant District Attorney of Lehigh County from 1989 to 2000 and Philadelphia County from 2000 to 2001.

== Political career ==
=== Pennsylvania House ===
Reichley was elected to the Pennsylvania House of Representatives for the 134th district as a Republican. Reichley served five consecutive terms and served on the Select Committee on Information Security and the Commission on Sentencing. Additionally, he was appointed to the House Appropriations Committee as the Vice-Chairman, and also served on the Consumer Affairs, Health and Human Services, Judiciary, Professional Licensure, Transportation, and Urban Affairs committees. He was also named State Public Official of the Year for 2010.

Reichley was endorsed by The Morning Call in his 2006 reelection bid against Democrat Christopher Casey, a previously unsuccessful candidate for Upper Macungie Supervisor.

Reichley notably fought for the investigative department of the Pennsylvania gaming control board to become independent from the board itself, arguing that the department cannot function if it is still held responsible to the board it is supposed to be investigating. At the time in 2008 the gaming control board was embroiled in multiple scandals regarding casinos making campaign contributions. Reichley argued that the investigative department should instead be under the control of the Pennsylvania Attorney General, however, his motion would be defeated at the urging of State Senator Jay Costa due to the ability of the attorney general to accept campaign contributions.

In 2009, Reichley opposed a taxpayer funded health insurance program arguing that taxpayer funding was an "unreliable funding source" and that instead a private sector approach, where private companies would receive tax credits for insurance. He also argued that since the tax credit system was already in place it would be more efficient than creating an entirely new government program.

One of Reichley's last acts as a legislature was to advocate for November to be named Alzheimer's Disease Awareness Month. He also advocated for an increase in government resources to support those with the disease.

Reichley resigned from the house on December 30, 2011 after being elected as a Judge to the Court of Common Pleas. Due to his resignation a special election was held, with five local Republican community leaders vying for Reichley's position, with Ryan Mackenzie, son of Milou Mackenzie, winning the primary to go on and defeat Democrat Patrick Slattery.

=== Lehigh County judge ===
In June 2012 Reichley spoke at an event hosted by the Concerned East Penn Taxpayers Association in his hometown of Emmaus reflecting on his career in the house, and his new positions on the Pennsylvania Constitution.

On November 6, 2014, Reichley volunteered to serve on the Lower Macungie Township parks board to help make decisions about the township's parks and recreation offerings. Reichley argued that the parks board was "the least likely board to pose a conflict of interest" with his job as a judge. However, it was quickly revealed that as per the Pennsylvania Code of Judicial Conduct "a judge shall not accept appointment to a governmental committee, board, commission or other governmental position unless it is one that concerns the law, the legal system or the administration of justice" and Reichley withdrew his application early in the morning on November 7.

== Personal ==
Reichley has served many posts in his community as president of the Allentown YMCA/YWCA, the Emmaus Kiwanis and on the board of the Lehigh Valley Crime Victims’ Council. He has also been an instructor at Lehigh University, the Allentown Police Academy, Northampton County Community College, and DeSales University and had taught fellow prosecutors at meetings of the Pennsylvania District Attorneys’ Association and the Pennsylvania Bar Institute.
