= Adam Harris =

Adam Harris may refer to:

- Adam Harris (politician) (born 1975), American Republican politician and former member of the Pennsylvania House of Representatives
- Adam Harris (athlete) (born 1987), American-Guyanese sprinter
- Adam Harris (autistic advocate) (born 1994), Irish autism activist
