= Richard Geist =

American politician (1944–2019)

Richard A. Geist

Member of the Pennsylvania House of Representatives from the 79th district
- In office January 2, 1979 – 2013
- Preceded by: John P. Milliron
- Succeeded by: John McGinnis

Personal details
- Born: November 21, 1944 Altoona, Pennsylvania, U.S.
- Died: August 29, 2019 (aged 74) St. Petersburg, Russia
- Party: Republican
- Spouse: Jean Elizabeth Geist
- Education: Pennsylvania State University

Richard A. Geist (November 21, 1944 – August 29, 2019) was an American politician who served as a Republican member of the Pennsylvania House of Representatives for the 79th District, first elected in 1978.

== Career ==
Prior to his election to the House, Geist worked as a senior manager with EADS, a civil engineering firm, in Altoona.

He was elected to the House in 1978 and has won re-election to each succeeding session of the House.

In 2001, Geist briefly considered running for the vacant ninth district congressional seat held by Rep. Bud Shuster. He stayed out of the race, only offering himself as a compromise candidate between two rival factions.

He was Republican chairman of the House Transportation Committee and House Committee on Committees. He also sat on the House Rules and Commerce Committees. Geist was president of the High Speed Ground Transportation Association and the first chairman of the Pennsylvania High-Speed Intercity Rail Passenger Commission.

Geist was defeated by a member of the Tea Party in the primary on April 24, 2012, while seeking re-election to an anticipated 18th term. John D. McGinnis, a finance professor from Penn State Altoona who held the position for three terms.

== Personal ==
Geist was a graduate of Altoona Area High School and an associate degree from Penn State University - College of Engineering. He was also a Kellogg Fellow and a graduate of the Public Affairs Leadership Program.

Geist and his wife resided in Altoona.

Geist died in St. Petersburg, Russia on August 29, 2019.
