= Daylin Leach =

American politician from Pennsylvania

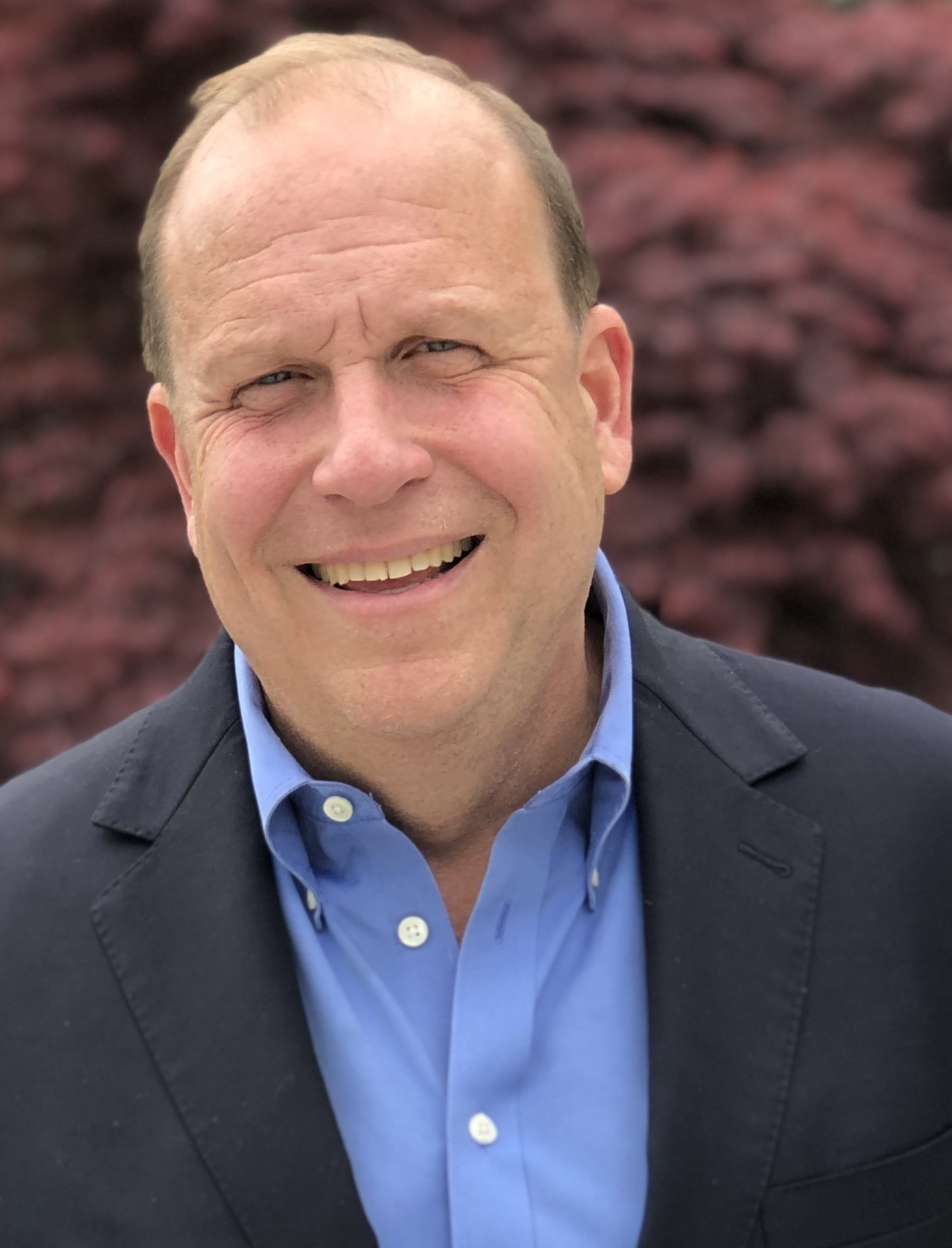

Member of the Pennsylvania Senate from the 17th district
- In office January 3, 2009 – December 4, 2020
- Preceded by: Constance H. Williams
- Succeeded by: Amanda Cappelletti
- Constituency: Parts of Delaware and Montgomery Counties

Member of the Pennsylvania House of Representatives from the 149th district
- In office January 7, 2003 – November 30, 2008
- Preceded by: Wallis Brooks
- Succeeded by: Tim Briggs

Personal details
- Born: June 23, 1961 (age 65) Philadelphia, Pennsylvania, U.S.
- Party: Democratic
- Spouse: Jennifer Anne Mirak
- Children: 2
- Education: Temple University; University of Houston Law Center
- Profession: Attorney

Daylin Leach (born June 23, 1961) is a former American politician and lawyer, who was a member of the Pennsylvania State Senate for the 17th senatorial district from 2009 until 2020. He was previously a member of the Pennsylvania House of Representatives, representing the 149th district from 2003 to 2009.

== Early life, education, and legal career ==
Leach was born in Philadelphia and graduated from Parkland High School in 1979 in Allentown, Pennsylvania. He received a B.A. in political science from Temple University in 1983 and a J.D. from the University of Houston Law Center in 1986.

He practiced law for 16 years, focusing on family and education law. He taught constitutional law, legal ethics and First Amendment law as an adjunct professor at Cedar Crest College and Muhlenberg College. Leach served as president of the Pennsylvania Young Democrats in the early 1990s and on the Allentown Zoning Board from 1990 to 1994. During his career, he co-hosted Lehigh Valley Firing Line, a local weekly political debate TV program.

In 2016, Philadelphia law firm Sacks Weston Diamond LLC hired Leach to advise clients on medical marijuana licensing, permitting and regulatory rules. He left the firm in July, 2017, when he announced his congressional candidacy.

== Pennsylvania House of Representatives ==
=== Elections ===
==== 2002 ====
Leach first ran for the 149th legislative district in a special election on February 12, 2002, following the resignation of Democrat Connie Williams. Leach was the Democratic nominee and lost to Republican Wallis Brooks 48%-44%, a difference of 273 votes.

In the November 2002 rematch of their February special election, the Brooks campaign sent dozens of direct mail advertisements, including one accusing Leach of defending child molesters as an attorney. On the Saturday before the election, one was sent to voters accusing Leach of being anti-Semitic. The mailer carried a headline of "Anti-Semitism, Neo-Nazism, Holocaust Denial. They are not 'a big joke.'" The charges stemmed from Leach's 1999 defense of an in absentia client from Texas who was sued in Allentown, Pennsylvania, for alleged comments in an Internet chat room. Following the dismissal, the plaintiff posted on the Internet, denouncing Leach and the Texas man as anti-Semites. The posts were unearthed by a Brooks researcher and used in the mailer. "She had to know I was Jewish, because it had come up in a debate. But since I have a non-Jewish surname, she apparently thought she could get away with this," Leach said. The campaign immediately convinced a local Jewish newspaper to denounce the mailer and reproduced the article on a flyer with a profile of Leach, emphasizing his Jewish roots and activism, on the reverse. By election day, 70 volunteers had hand-delivered the literature to most district households. On November 5, 2002, Leach defeated Brooks 53%-47%, a difference of 1,170 votes.

==== 2004 ====
Leach won re-election to a second term, defeating Republican Brad Murphy 62%-38%.

==== 2006 ====
Leach won re-election to a third term, defeating Republican Monica Treichel 67%-33%.

=== Tenure ===
In 2003, the political website PoliticsPA named him to "The Best of the Freshman Class" list, saying that he "has all the ingredients of a rising star" and that he "makes the job look fun."

In August 2005, Leach published an op-ed article in The Philadelphia Inquirer criticizing the paper's coverage of the 2005 Pennsylvania General Assembly pay raise controversy. In what the Philadelphia City Paper called "the paper's first round against Leach," Inquirer columnist John Grogan responded by accusing Leach of "funny math." In response, Leach "struck back" against the Inquirer with a satirical email to associates under the pseudonym "Dutch Larooo" criticizing Inquirer reporter Mario F. Cattabiani.

On September 1, 2005, Mario F. Cattabiani published a front-page article in The Philadelphia Inquirer that "exposed" Leach's long-standing and satirical blog "leachvent.com." The Philadelphia City Paper criticized the Inquirer for allowing Cattabiani to "answer his attacker" through a news article, noting that "thousands of insiders have laughed at Leach's satire for years," but the Inquirer acted as though it had been "recently discovered." The Philadelphia City Paper wrote that Cattabiani's article incorrectly characterized Leach's website as a "blog" rather than satire and had focused on Leach's pseudonym's "impure thoughts," while ignoring the "satirical attack" on his Cattabiani's reporting. The next day, Leach removed his website. John Grogan wrote that Leach had "dug his own political grave." The Philadelphia City Paper criticized these negative articles about Leach by stating that "hidden behind the newspaper's florid obsession with Leach's naughty bits, is the state rep's pointed satire of their mediocre coverage – a criticism that the newspaper never addresses...The Inquirer savaged this young legislator because his satire was hitting its mark: Them."

Notable work in the House includes proposed bills that would allow hybrid cars into the state fleet, that give state funding for breast and ovarian cancer screening for low-income women, that would address redistricting reform, that would eliminate state's lethal use of paralytic drugs, and that would require hospitals to offer emergency contraception to sexual assault victims.

=== Committee assignments ===
- State Government

== Pennsylvania Senate ==
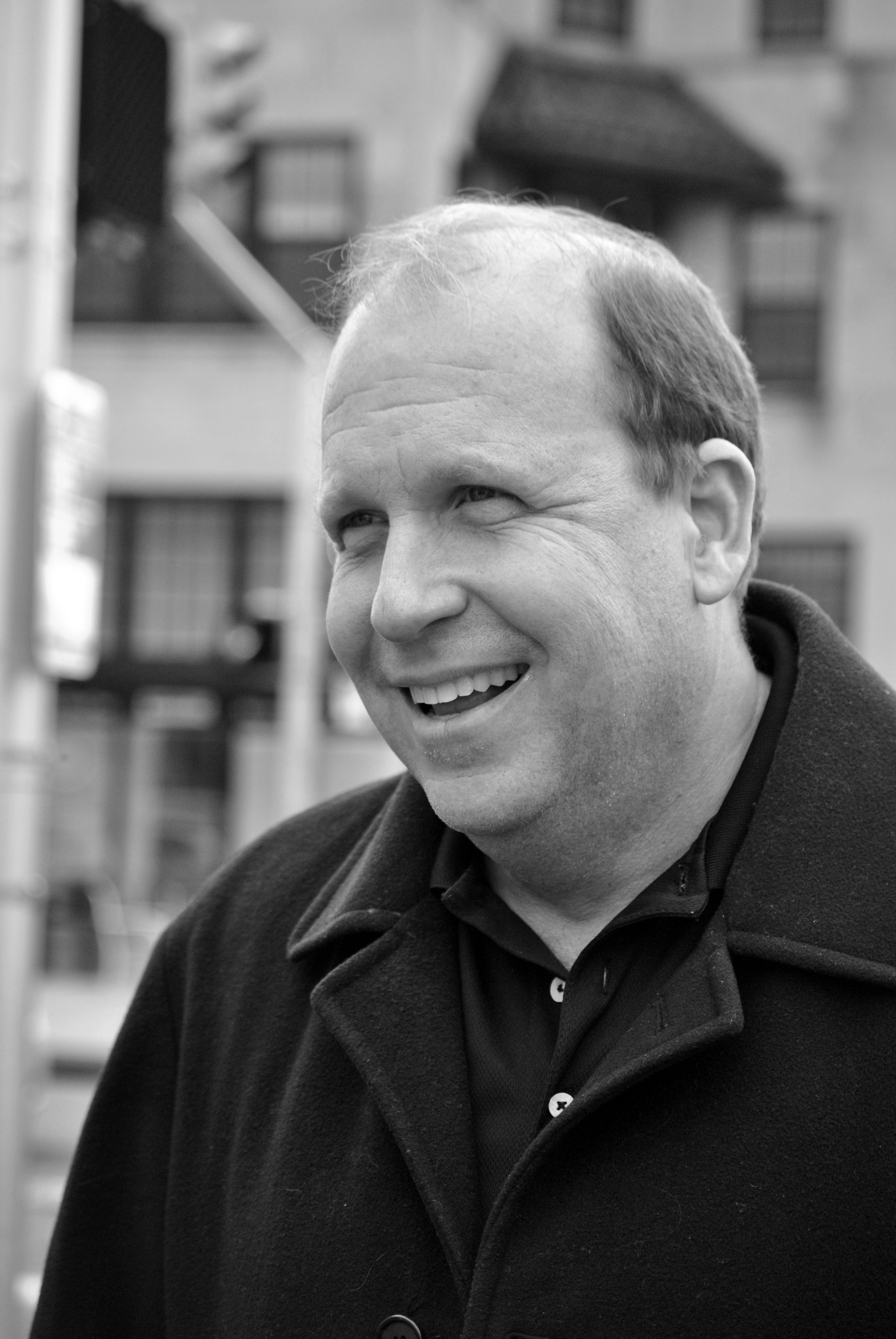
Leach in 2012

=== Elections ===
2008

When Connie Williams of Pennsylvania's 17th senate district decided to retire, Leach decided to enter the election. He was the Democratic nominee and defeated Republican Lance Rogers, a Lower Merion Township Commissioner, 62%-38%.

2012

Leach won re-election to a second term, defeating Republican nominee Charles Gehret 63%-37%.

2016

Leach won re-election to a third term, defeating Republican nominee Brian Gondek 64%-36%.

2020

Leach faced attorney and East Norriton Township, Pennsylvania Board of Supervisors Vice Chairwoman, Amanda Cappelletti, in the Democratic party. Cappelletti defeated Leach, receiving 63% of the vote and winning every county in the district.

=== Tenure ===
Leach was awarded the 2008 Humane Legislator Award by the Humane Society of the United States, the 2011 Legislative Leadership Award by GVF Transportation, and the 2011 Friend of Education Award by the Lower Merion Education Association.

In January 2013, he proposed legislation that would legalize recreational use of marijuana in Pennsylvania for people 21 years or older, called the "Regulate Marijuana Act." In defending it, Leach argued “We would never, in a rational society, starting from scratch, have the policy we have now.”

In 2016, a bill sponsored by Leach, legalizing some marijuana products for medical use, became law. The medical marijuana bill sponsored by Leach does not permit medical patients to grow their own cannabis, and subsequent efforts by others to change the law have failed.

In 2017, Leach made headlines in response to President Trump's threat to "destroy the career" of a Texas state senator who proposed legislation requiring a conviction before civil asset forfeiture, by goading the President to try to destroy Leach's career in a social media post.

In December 2017, Leach was accused of inappropriately touching young female staffers and volunteers. Leach's attorney referred to media reports as a witch hunt. In a written statement, Leach denied the accusations, which he attributed to an unnamed political opponent. In response to the allegations, Gov. Wolf called on Leach to resign. In a statement the next day, Leach said he planned to stay in his seat and work with Senate leaders to address the allegations. On February 24, 2018, Leach abandoned his congressional campaign but announced that he will remain in his state senate seat. In September 2019, an auditors report commissioned by the Pennsylvania Democratic Caucus concluded, "With respect to Senator Leach's behavior while as a member of the Senate, we conclude that there is no evidence of actionable discrimination for harassment in violation of applicable law or Caucus policies." Further, the report found, "At no time did any such behavior actually create a hostile work environment under the circumstances presented here."

=== Committee assignments ===
- Education
- Environmental Resources & Energy

== Congressional campaigns ==
=== 2014 congressional election ===
On April 1, 2013, Main Line Times reported that Leach would run for Pennsylvania's 13th congressional district, which was open as incumbent Democrat Allyson Schwartz ran for Governor of Pennsylvania in 2014. However, while the majority of Upper Merion Township is within the boundaries of the 13th Congressional district, Leach's home in Wayne, Upper Merion Township is actually within the state's 7th Congressional district. Leach lost in the Democratic primary, winning only 16.6% of the vote.

=== 2018 congressional election ===
On July 3, 2017, Leach announced his candidacy for the Congressional seat held by Republican Pat Meehan in Pennsylvania's 7th congressional district. Leach was expected to have several Democratic primary opponents. On December 18, 2017, Leach announced he was "taking a step back" from his campaign to deal with misconduct allegations of sexual talk and inappropriate touching. His lawyer said that "doesn’t mean he's quitting." In January 2018, Meehan withdrew his candidacy for reelection after revelations that he had used taxpayer funds to settle a sexual harassment complaint. (Meehan resigned On April 27, 2018, saying he would pay back the taxpayer funds used for the settlement.)

After the Pennsylvania Supreme Court threw out the state's old congressional map, Leach's home, along with most of the Montgomery County portion of the old 7th, was drawn into the new 4th District, the successor to the old 13th. On February 24, 2018, Leach finally succumbed to pressures from fellow Democrats, including Governor Tom Wolf, to abandon his congressional campaign, announcing his withdrawal on his Facebook page. He had accumulated an impressive war chest for the election to the newly redrawn district.

== Personal life ==
According to Jewish Exponent, Leach is "known for being outspoken and proud of his Jewish identity".

Leach formerly served as an ex-officio member of the Bryn Mawr Film Institute and a member of the Norristown Farm Park Advisory Committee

Pennsylvania State Senate
Preceded by Constance Williams	Member of the Pennsylvania Senate for the 17th District; 2009-2020	Succeeded by Amanda Cappelletti
Pennsylvania House of Representatives
Preceded by Wallis Brooks	Member of the Pennsylvania House of Representatives for the 149th District; 2003 – 2009	Succeeded by Tim Briggs
