= Matthew N. Wright =

American politician

Member of the Pennsylvania House of Representatives from the 142nd district
- In office January 1, 1991 – November 30, 2006
- Preceded by: James L. Wright, Jr.
- Succeeded by: Christopher J. King

Personal details
- Born: January 15, 1959 (age 67) Trenton, New Jersey
- Party: Republican
- Spouse: Donna
- Children: 2
- Occupation: Legislator-Store Manager

Matthew N. Wright (born January 15, 1959) is a former Republican member of the Pennsylvania House of Representatives.

== Biography ==
Born in Trenton, New Jersey on January 15, 1959, Wright graduated from Neshaminy Maple Point High School and attended classes at Bucks County Community College and Trenton State College.

Prior to entering politics, Wright was a retail manager and a small business owner. He was first elected to represent the 142nd legislative district in the Pennsylvania House of Representatives in 1990, succeeding his father James L. Wright, Jr. He was defeated for re-election in 2006 by Christopher J. King, who campaigned heavily against Wright's vote for and acceptance of the 2005 Pennsylvania General Assembly pay raise.

In 2010, Wright paid $10,000 to settle a case before the Pennsylvania State Ethics Commission that claimed that he had violated the Pennsylvania Ethics Act by using his legislative employees and state resources for campaign purposes, including the use of state workers to coordinate election fundraisers, compose and assemble written materials, and solicit and collect campaign donations.
