= Joseph Preston Jr. =

American politician (born 1947)

Member of the Pennsylvania House of Representatives from the 24th district
- In office January 4, 1983 – 2013
- Preceded by: William W. Pendleton
- Succeeded by: Ed Gainey

Personal details
- Born: May 28, 1947 (age 79) Vandergrift, Pennsylvania
- Party: Democratic
- Spouse: Odelfa Preston
- Education: University of Pittsburgh
- Occupation: Businessman

Joseph Preston Jr. (born May 28, 1947) is a former Democratic member of the Pennsylvania House of Representatives for the 24th District, elected in 1982.

Preston was unseated in 2012 by former aide Ed Gainey, who won the 2012 primary against Preston.
