= Pennsylvania House of Representatives, District 134 =

American legislative district

Pennsylvania's 134th State House of Representatives district
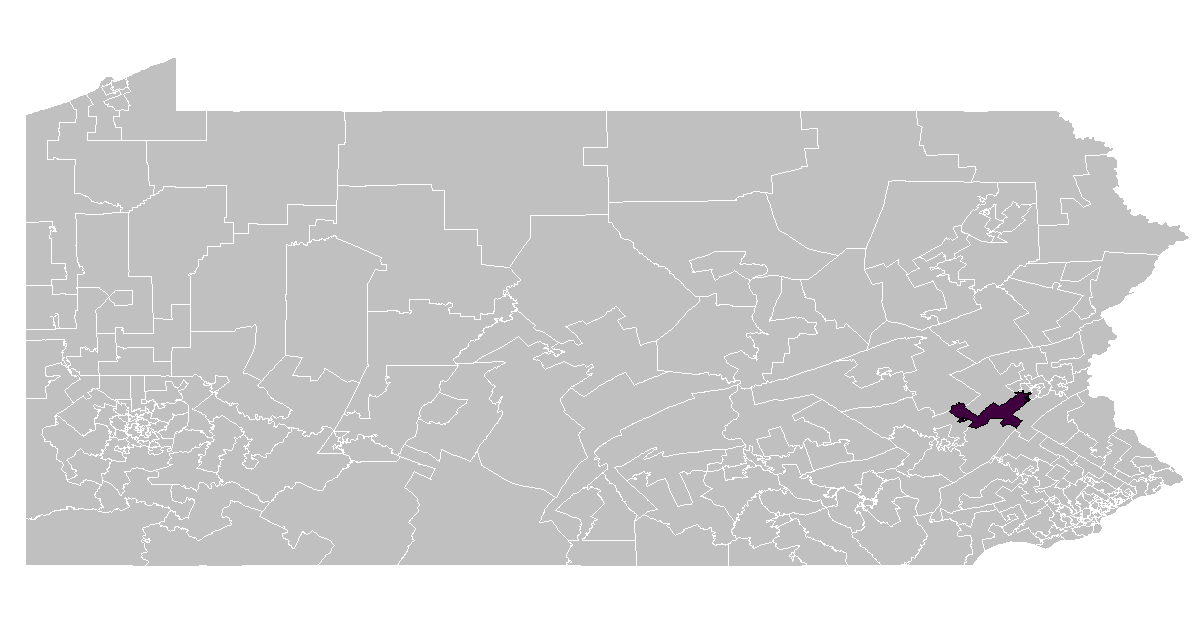
Representative
Peter Schweyer; D–Allentown
- Demographics: 91.4% White; 2.3% Black; 4.0% Hispanic
- Population (2011) • Citizens of voting age: 64,155; 49,633

The 134th Pennsylvania House of Representatives District is located in Southeastern Pennsylvania and has been represented since 2023 by Peter Schweyer.

== District profile ==
The 134th Pennsylvania House of Representatives District is located in Lehigh County. It includes the following areas:

- Allentown (PART)
  - Ward 02
  - Ward 03
  - Ward 11 [PART, Divisions 01 and 03]
  - Ward 12
  - Ward 13 [PART, Divisions 01, 02 and 03]
  - Ward 16
  - Ward 19
- Emmaus
- Salisbury Township (PART, Wards 04 and 05)

== Representatives ==
Representative	Party	Years	District home	Note
Prior to 1969, seats were apportioned by county.
William A. Steckel	Republican	1969 – 1970		
Joseph Zeller	Democrat	1971 – 1980		
Donald Snyder	Republican	1981 – 2000		
Jane S. Baker	Republican	2001 – 2002		
Doug Reichley	Republican	2003 – 2012	Emmaus	Resigned to take office as Lehigh County Judge
Ryan Mackenzie	Republican	2012-2022		elected in April 24 special election same day as primary
Peter Schweyer	Democrat	2023–present		Incumbent; district moved in 2022 redistricting

== Recent election results ==
PA House election, 2010: Pennsylvania House, District 134
Party	Candidate	Votes	%	±%
Republican	Doug Reichley	2,256	71.51	
Democratic	Patrick Slattery	899	28.49	
Margin of victory		1,357	43.02	
Turnout		3,155	100	

PA House election, 2012: Pennsylvania House, District 134
Party	Candidate	Votes	%	±%
Republican	Ryan Mackenzie	22,360	59.60	
Democratic	John Reynard	15,159	40.40	
Margin of victory		7,201	19.20	
Turnout		37,519	100	

PA House election, 2014: Pennsylvania House, District 134
Party	Candidate	Votes	%	±%
Republican	Ryan Mackenzie	3,690	100	
Margin of victory		3,690	100	
Turnout		3,690	100	

PA House election, 2016: Pennsylvania House, District 134
Party	Candidate	Votes	%	±%
Republican	Ryan Mackenzie	6,505	100	
Margin of victory		6,505	100	
Turnout		6,505	100	

PA House election, 2018: Pennsylvania House, District 134
Party	Candidate	Votes	%	±%
Republican	Ryan Mackenzie	12,026	55.56	
Democratic	Thomas Applebach	9,618	44.44	
Margin of victory		2,408	11.12	
Turnout		21,644	100	
