= Pennsylvania House of Representatives, District 130 =

American legislative district

Coordinates: 40.31618°N 75.72052°W

Pennsylvania's 130th State House of Representatives district
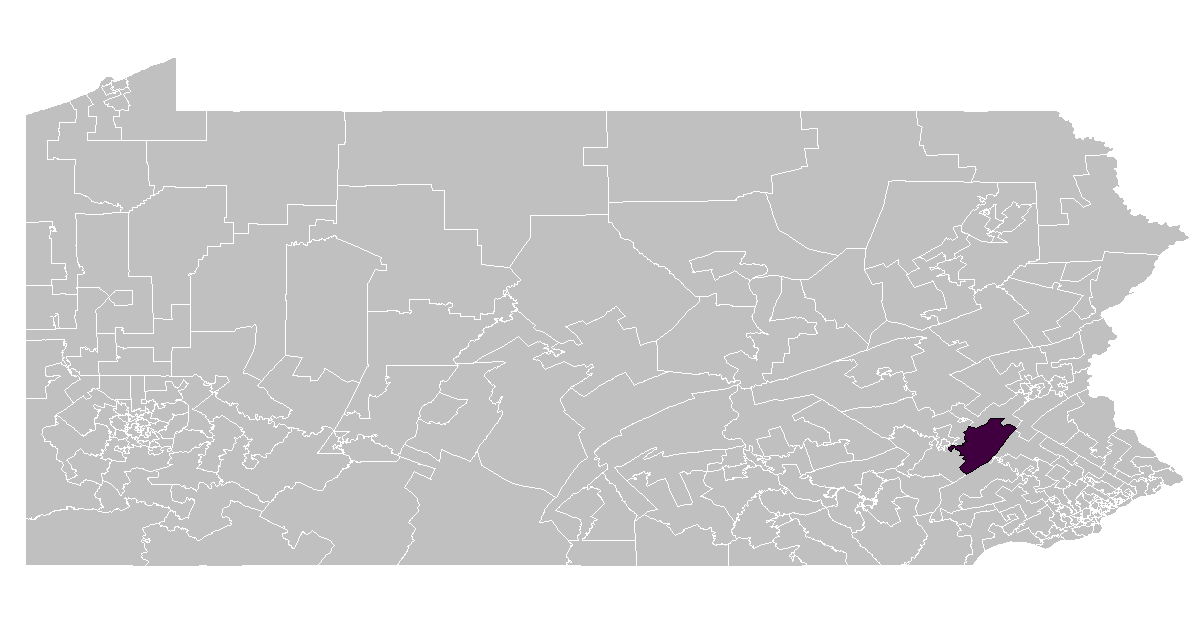
Representative
| David M. Maloney; R–Boyertown |
- Demographics: 94.9% White; 2.0% Black; 2.0% Hispanic
- Population (2011) • Citizens of voting age: 62,508; 47,630

The 130th Pennsylvania House of Representatives District is located in Southeastern Pennsylvania and has been represented since 2011 by David M. Maloney.

== District profile ==
The 130th Pennsylvania House of Representatives District is located within Berks County. It includes the Rhoads Opera House and the Hartman Cider Press. It is made up of the following areas:

- Berks County
  - Amity Township
  - Bally
  - Bechtelsville
  - Birdsboro
  - Boyertown
  - Colebrookdale Township
  - District Township
  - Douglass Township
  - Earl Township
  - Exeter Township (PART, Precincts 02, 04, 06, 08 and 10)
  - Oley Township
  - Pike Township
  - Union Township
  - Washington Township

== Representatives ==
| Representative | Party | Years | District home | Note |
Prior to 1969, seats were apportioned by county.
| Lester K. Fryer | Democrat | 1969 – 1986 | | |
| Dennis E. Leh | Republican | 1987 – 2006 | | |
| David R. Kessler | Democrat | 2007 – 2010 | Boyertown | |
| David M. Maloney | Republican | 2011 – present | | Incumbent |

== Recent election results ==
PA House election, 2010: Pennsylvania House, District 130
| Party | Candidate | Votes | % | ±% |
|---|---|---|---|---|
| Republican | David M. Maloney | 12,848 | 57.50 | |
| Democratic | David R. Kessler | 9,498 | 42.50 | |
| Margin of victory | | 3,350 | 15.00 | |
| Turnout | | 12,848 | 100 | |

PA House election, 2012: Pennsylvania House, District 130
| Party | Candidate | Votes | % | ±% |
|---|---|---|---|---|
| Republican | David M. Maloney | 19,903 | 62.89 | |
| Democratic | Russell James Diesinger | 11,743 | 37.11 | |
| Margin of victory | | 8,160 | 25.78 | ▲10.78 |
| Turnout | | 31,646 | 100 | |

PA House election, 2014: Pennsylvania House, District 130
| Party | Candidate | Votes | % | ±% |
|---|---|---|---|---|
| Republican | David M. Maloney | 11,177 | 62.00 | |
| Democratic | David R. Kessler | 6,851 | 38.00 | |
| Margin of victory | | 4,326 | 24 | ▼1.78 |
| Turnout | | 18,028 | 100 | |

PA House election, 2016: Pennsylvania House, District 130
| Party | Candidate | Votes | % | ±% |
|---|---|---|---|---|
| Republican | David M. Maloney | 24,860 | 100 | |
| Margin of victory | | 24,860 | 100 | |
| Turnout | | 24,860 | 100 | |
