= Pennsylvania Route 562 =

State highway in Berks County, Pennsylvania, US

Pennsylvania Route 562

Route information
- Maintained by PennDOT
- Length: 13.920 mi (22.402 km)

Major junctions
- West end: US 422 Bus. in St. Lawrence
- PA 662 in Yellow House
- East end: PA 73 in Boyertown

Location
- Country: United States
- State: Pennsylvania
- Counties: Berks

Highway system
- Pennsylvania State Route System; Interstate; US; State; Scenic; Legislative
← PA 555	→ PA 563

Pennsylvania Route 562 (PA 562) is a state highway in Berks County, Pennsylvania. The route runs 13.92 mi (22.40 km) from U.S. Route 422 Business (US 422 Bus.) in St. Lawrence east to PA 73 in Boyertown. PA 562 is a two-lane undivided road its entire length, passing through rural areas of eastern Berks County as it connects Boyertown to the Reading area. Along the way, PA 562 intersects PA 662 in the community of Yellow House. PA 562 was first designated by 1930 between Stonersville and PA 62 (later PA 100) southwest of Boyertown, running via Amityville and Yellow House. In the 1930s, the route was extended west to US 422 (now US 422 Bus.) in St. Lawrence and was realigned to its current alignment. PA 562 was extended east to PA 73 in 1964 after PA 100 was shifted to a new alignment to the east of Boyertown.

== Route description ==
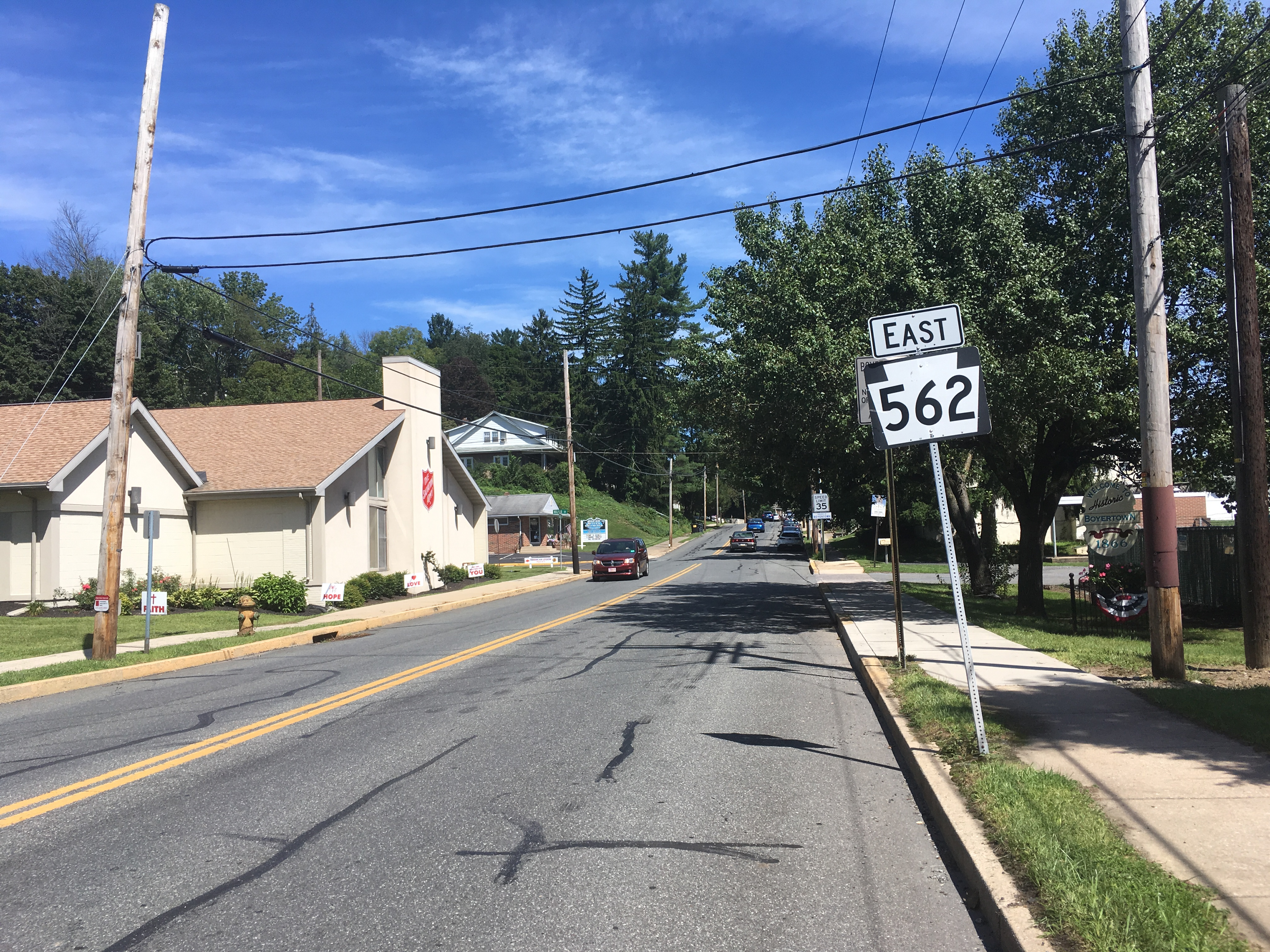
PA 562 eastbound entering Boyertown

PA 562 begins at an intersection with US 422 Bus. in the borough of St. Lawrence in Berks County to the east of the city of Reading. From this intersection, the route heads east as two-lane undivided St. Lawrence Avenue, passing through business areas and crossing Antietam Creek. The road curves southeast into residential areas, soon turning to the east. PA 562 leaves St. Lawrence for Exeter Township and becomes Boyertown Pike, passing through the residential community of Jacksonwald. The road continues into a mix of farmland and woodland with some homes, curving southeast as it comes to the community of Stonersville. The route heads northeast into Amity Township and continues through agricultural areas, curving east and forming the border between Oley Township to the north and Amity Township to the south. In the community of Yellow House, PA 562 crosses PA 662.

The road continues east through farmland and becomes the border between Earl Township to the north and Amity Township to the south as it comes to the residential community of Earlville and crosses Manatawny Creek. The route bends south to fully enter Amity Township, where it runs between woodland to the north and residential subdivisions to the south. PA 562 continues east-northeast into Earl Township and passes through a mix of farms and woods with some homes, soon entering Douglass Township. The road becomes Reading Avenue and continues through rural areas, passing through the community of Greshville. The route heads northeast into Colebrookdale Township and intersects Farmington Avenue as it passes through the residential community of Morysville. PA 562 enters the borough of Boyertown and crosses Ironstone Creek as it continues past homes and some businesses on South Reading Avenue before it reaches its eastern terminus at PA 73 in the commercial downtown. North Reading Avenue continues past this intersection as State Route 2067, an unsigned quadrant route, to an interchange with PA 100 near New Berlinville.

== History ==
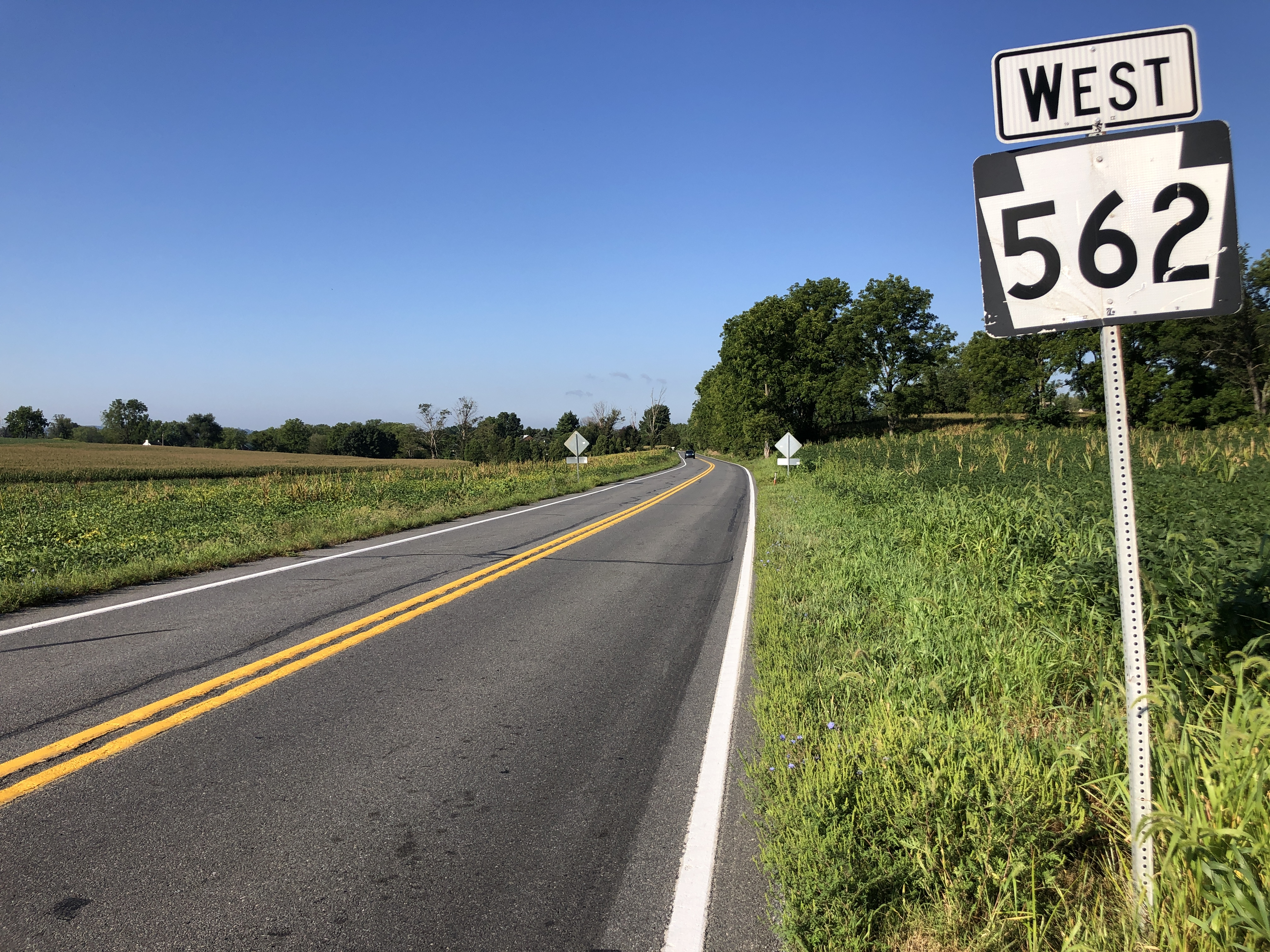
PA 562 westbound in Amity Township

When routes were legislated in Pennsylvania in 1911, present-day PA 562 was not legislated as part of a route. By 1926, the roadway between Yellow House and Boyertown was paved. In 1927, PA 62 (later PA 100) was designated to follow Reading Avenue through Boyertown north of Farmington Avenue. The road between St. Lawrence and Yellow House was paved by 1928. PA 562 was designated by 1930 to run from Stonersville east to PA 62 southwest of Boyertown. The route followed Weavertown Road east to PA 662 in Amityville, where it turned north to Yellow House before continuing east along its current alignment. In the 1930s, PA 562 was extended west to US 422 (now US 422 Bus.) in St. Lawrence and was realigned to its current alignment between Stonersville and Yellow House, with an extension of PA 662 replacing the former alignment between Amityville and Yellow House. In 1964, PA 562 was extended to its current terminus at PA 73 in Boyertown, replacing a portion of PA 100 that was rerouted to a new divided highway alignment to the east. On June 28, 2018, a portion of PA 562 was named the General Carl A. Spaatz Memorial Highway in honor of Carl Spaatz, a World War II general. A dedication ceremony was held with State Representative David Maloney in attendance.

== Major intersections ==
The entire route is in Berks County.

Location	mi	km	Destinations	Notes
St. Lawrence	0.000	0.000	US 422 Bus. (Perkiomen Avenue) – Pottstown, Mount Penn, Reading	Western terminus
Amity–Oley township line	7.148	11.504	PA 662 (Memorial Highway/Old Swede Road) – Fleetwood, Douglassville	
Boyertown	13.920	22.402	PA 73 (Philadelphia Avenue) – Oley, Philadelphia	Eastern terminus
1.000 mi = 1.609 km; 1.000 km = 0.621 mi
