= Earlville, Pennsylvania =

Unincorporated community in Pennsylvania, US

- Unincorporated community
- Location within Pennsylvania
- Coordinates: 40°19′00″N 75°44′13″W
- Country: United States
- State: Pennsylvania
- County: Berks
- Townships: Amity and Earl
- Elevation: 246 ft (75 m)
- Time zone: UTC-5 (Eastern (EST))
  - Summer (DST): UTC-4 (EDT)
- ZIP code: 19519
- Area codes: 610 and 484
- GNIS feature ID: 1173714

Earlville is an unincorporated community on the border of Amity and Earl townships in Berks County, Pennsylvania, United States. Earlville is located along Pennsylvania Route 562 at the crossing of Manatawny Creek, west of Boyertown.
