= Boyers Junction, Pennsylvania =

Unincorporated community in Pennsylvania, US

- Unincorporated community
- Location within Pennsylvania Location within the United States
- Coordinates: 40°26′26″N 75°46′13″W
- Country: United States
- State: Pennsylvania
- County: Berks
- Township: Rockland
- Time zone: UTC-5 (Eastern (EST))
  - Summer (DST): UTC-4 (EDT)
- ZIP code: 19522
- Area codes: 610 & 484
- GNIS feature ID: 1170097

Boyers Junction is an unincorporated community in Berks County, Pennsylvania, United States. The village is located in southwestern Rockland Township at the intersections of Pricetown Road and Forgedale Road, near the Ruscombmanor Township line. It is also southeast of Fleetwood and south of Lyons. It is drained by the Bieber Creek southward into the Manatawny Creek, a tributary of the Schuylkill River. The Brandywine Heights Area School District serves Boyers Junction, which uses the Fleetwood zip code of 19522.
