= Dryville, Pennsylvania =

Unincorporated community in Pennsylvania, US

- Census-designated place
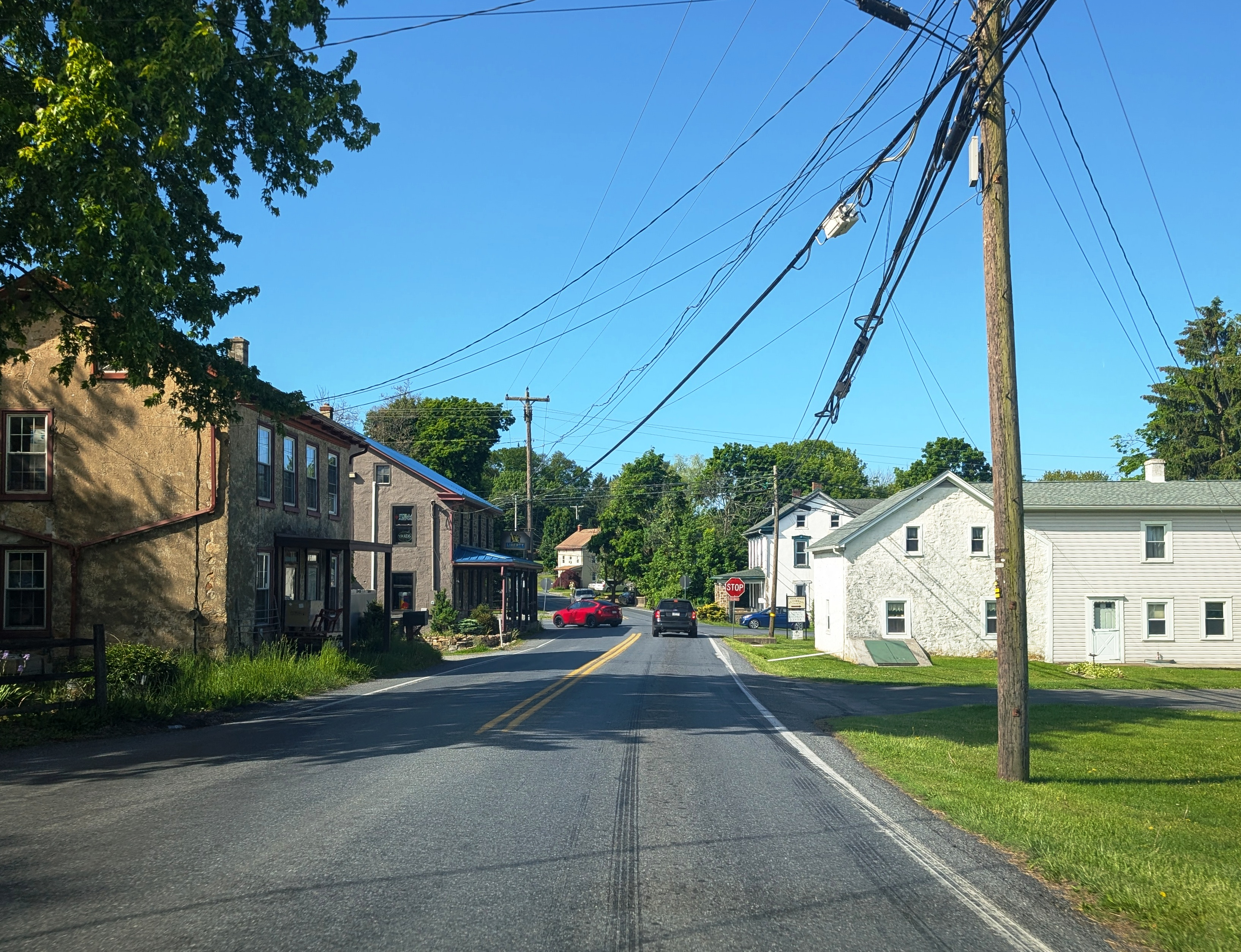
- Lyons Road southbound in Dryville

- Location within Pennsylvania Location within the United States
- Coordinates: 40°27′51″N 75°44′59″W
- Country: United States
- State: Pennsylvania
- County: Berks
- Township: Rockland

Area
  - Total: 1.39 sq mi (3.61 km^{2})
  - Land: 1.39 sq mi (3.60 km^{2})
  - Water: 0.0039 sq mi (0.01 km^{2})

Population (2020)
  - Total: 364
  - Density: 262.2/sq mi (101.23/km^{2})
- Time zone: UTC-5 (Eastern (EST))
  - Summer (DST): UTC-4 (EDT)
- ZIP codes: 19522 & 19539
- Area codes: 610 & 484
- FIPS code: 42-20096

Dryville is a census-designated place in Rockland Township, Berks County, Pennsylvania, United States. It is located one mile south of Lyons, and is located in the South Mountains and is drained by Bieber Creek into Manatawny Creek, a tributary of the Schuylkill River. It is split between the Fleetwood zip code of 19522 and the Mertztown Zip Code of 19539. As of the 2010 census, the population was 398 residents.

Historical population
Census	Pop.	Note	%±
2020	364		—
U.S. Decennial Census

== History ==
The village grew around the Henry Mertz Lutheran Church, which opened in 1747. Dryville was named in 1852 after Benjamin Dry, a local postmaster.
