= New Jerusalem, Pennsylvania =

Unincorporated community in Pennsylvania, US

- Census-designated place
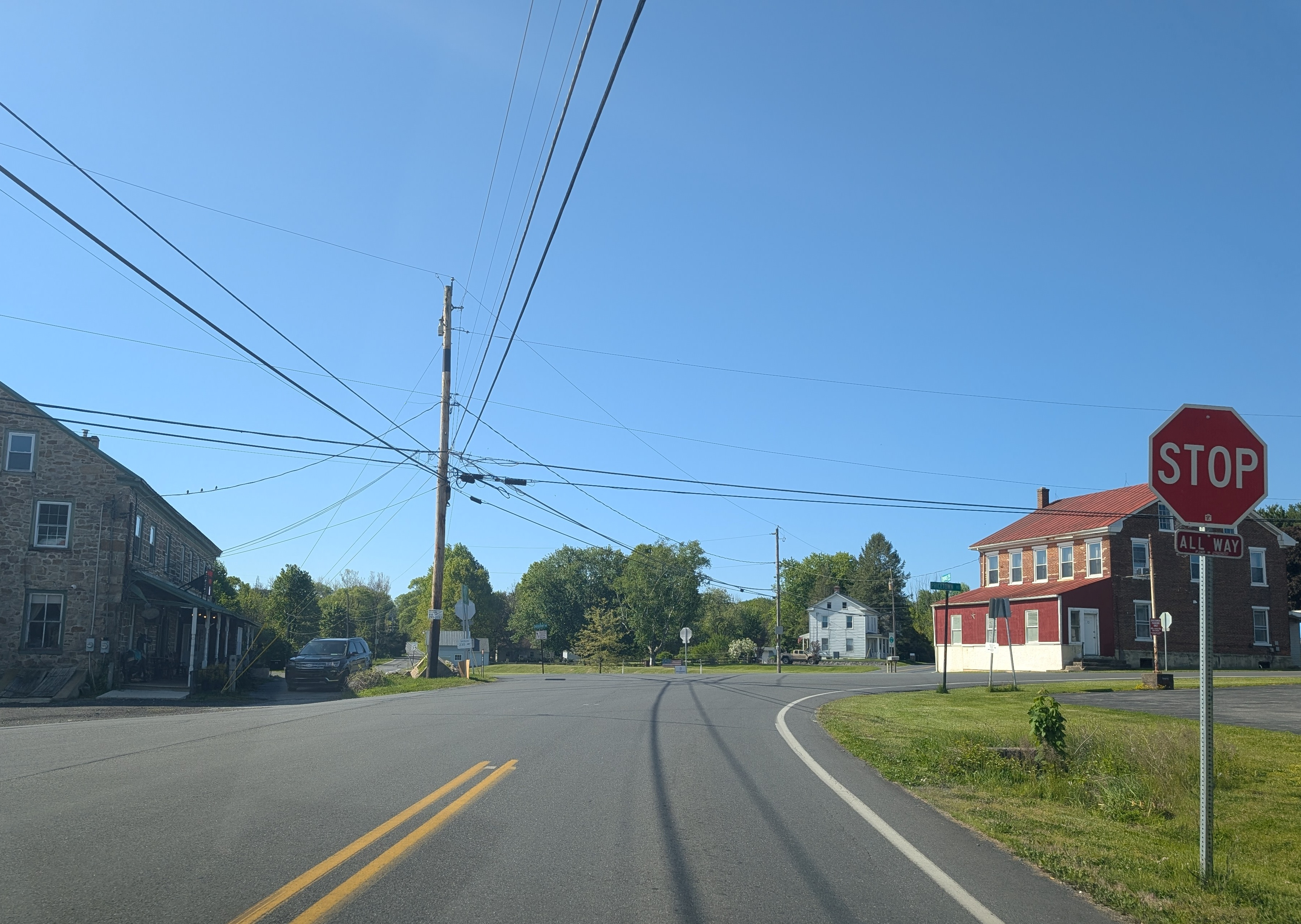
- Center of New Jerusalem

- Location within Pennsylvania Location within the United States
- Coordinates: 40°26′53″N 75°44′50″W
- Country: United States
- State: Pennsylvania
- County: Berks
- Township: Rockland

Area
  - Total: 1.82 sq mi (4.71 km^{2})
  - Land: 1.82 sq mi (4.71 km^{2})
  - Water: 0.0039 sq mi (0.01 km^{2})
- Elevation: 899 ft (274 m)

Population (2020)
  - Total: 598
  - Density: 329.2/sq mi (127.09/km^{2})
- Time zone: UTC-5 (Eastern (EST))
  - Summer (DST): UTC-4 (EDT)
- ZIP Code: 19522 (Fleetwood)
- Area codes: 610 and 484
- FIPS code: 42-53728
- GNIS feature ID: 1182336

New Jerusalem is a census-designated place in Rockland Township, Berks County, Pennsylvania, United States. It is located in the South Mountains and is drained by the Manatawny Creek into the Schuylkill River. As of the 2010 census, the population was 649 residents.

== Demographics ==
Historical population
| Census | Pop. | Note | %± |
|---|---|---|---|
| 2020 | 598 | | — |
U.S. Decennial Census
