= Yellow House, Pennsylvania =

Unincorporated community in Pennsylvania, US

- Unincorporated community
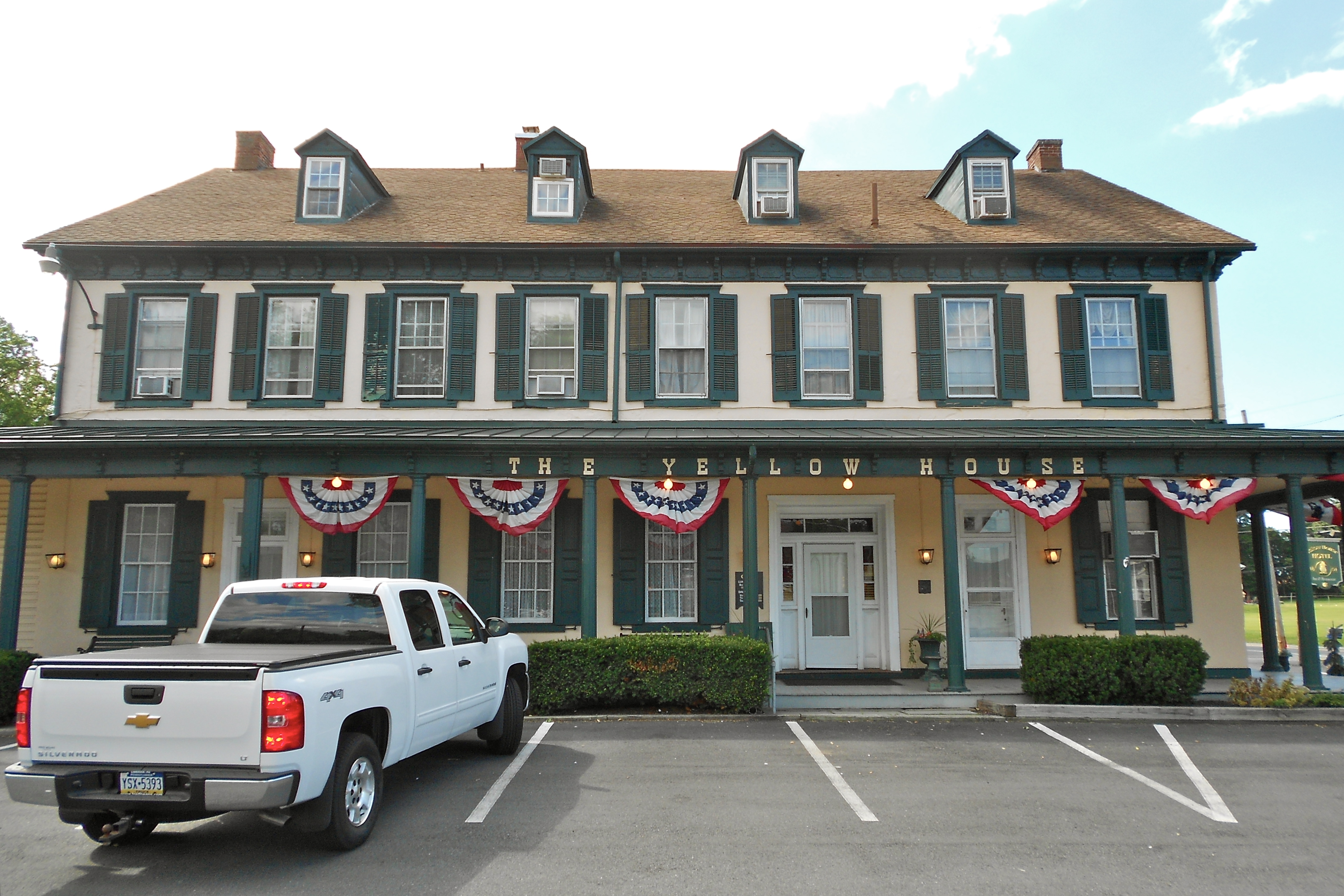
- Yellow House Hotel, founded 1801

- Location within Pennsylvania Location within the United States
- Coordinates: 40°19′23″N 75°45′17″W
- Country: United States
- State: Pennsylvania
- County: Berks
- Township: Amity and Oley
- Elevation: 289 ft (88 m)
- Time zone: UTC-5 (Eastern (EST))
  - Summer (DST): UTC-4 (EDT)
- ZIP codes: 19518, 19547
- Area codes: 610 and 484
- GNIS feature ID: 1191878

Yellow House is a village in eastern Berks County, Pennsylvania, United States, situated at the junction of Routes 562 and 662. It is located in Amity Township and Oley Township. It is drained by the Manatawny Creek into the Schuylkill River. It is split between the Douglassville and Oley post offices, which use the ZIP codes of 19518 and 19547, respectively.

== History ==
The Yellow House Hotel was founded in 1801. A post office called Yellow House was established in 1866, and remained in operation until 1974. The community took its name from a local inn.
