= Sally Ann =

Sally Ann may refer to:

- Sally Ann, Pennsylvania, an unincorporated community in Rockland Township, Berks County, Pennsylvania
- The Salvation Army
- "The Ballad of Sally Anne", a song with lyrics by Alice Randall to a traditional tune
- "Sally Ann", a 1959 song by The Chad Mitchell Trio
- "Sally Ann", a 1970 song by The Wild Angels
- "Sally Ann", a song by Rufus Wainwright, from the 1998 album Rufus Wainwright
- "Sally Ann (You're Such a Pretty Baby)", a 1969 song by The Cuff Links
- Sally–Anne test
