= Lester Fryer =

American politician

Lester K. Fryer

Member of the Pennsylvania House of Representatives from the 130th district
- In office January 7, 1969 – November 30, 1986
- Preceded by: District created
- Succeeded by: Dennis Leh

Member of the Pennsylvania House of Representatives from the Berks County district
- In office January 3, 1963 – November 30, 1968

Personal details
- Born: August 19, 1919 Colebrookdale Township, Berks County, Pennsylvania
- Died: May 5, 1990 (aged 70) Hershey, Pennsylvania
- Party: Democratic

Lester K. Fryer (August 19, 1919 – May 5, 1990) was a Democratic member of the Pennsylvania House of Representatives.

== Formative years ==
Born in Colebrookdale Township, Berks County, Pennsylvania on August 19, 1919, Fryer graduated from Boyertown High School in 1937, attended the United States Army Finance School in Fort Harrison, Indiana in 1942, and served in the United States Army from 1942 to 1945 (World War II). He then went on to become the owner of Fryer Beverages from 1948 to 1974.

== Political career ==
From 1954 t0 1957, he was the school director for Colebrookdale Township, and was then the school director for Boyertown Borough from 1958 to 1963. President of the Boyertown Democratic Club, he was elected to the Pennsylvania House of Representatives for its 1963 term, serving a total of twelve consecutive terms. Appointed to the Local Government Commission (1969-1970 and 1975-1986), he served as that commission's chair from 1983 to 1986. He opted not to run for reelection to the House in 1986.

In 1986, Fryer made news headlines for "a bizarre procedural maneuver," according to the Associated Press, which facilitated passage of Pennsylvania's $18.2 billion state budget while enabling state legislators to begin their weekend early. Fryer stood at the House speaker’s podium - "a lone lawmaker who led a chamber of empty chairs through voice votes on nine bills."

== Death and interment ==
He died on May 3, 1990, at the age of 70. Among survivors were his wife, Mary, and son, Charles. He was interred at the Union Cemetery in Boyertown.
