= Pine Forge, Pennsylvania =

Unincorporated community in Pennsylvania, US

- Unincorporated community
- Location within Pennsylvania
- Coordinates: 40°16′58″N 75°41′27″W
- Country: United States
- State: Pennsylvania
- County: Berks
- Township: Douglass
- Elevation: 177 ft (54 m)
- Time zone: UTC-5 (Eastern (EST))
  - Summer (DST): UTC-4 (EDT)
- ZIP code: 19548
- Area codes: 610 and 484
- GNIS feature ID: 1204395

Pine Forge is an unincorporated community in Douglass Township in Berks County, Pennsylvania, United States. Pine Forge is located along Manatawny Drive to the north of the Manatawny Creek and southwest of Boyertown.
