= Rabenold =

Rabenold is a surname. Notable people with the surname include:

- Charles F. Rabenold (1883–1968), American architect
- Ellwood M. Rabenold (1884–1970), American lawyer and politician
