= Morysville, Pennsylvania =

- Unincorporated community
- Location within Pennsylvania
- Coordinates: 40°19′28″N 75°39′4″W
- Country: United States
- State: Pennsylvania
- County: Berks
- Township: Colebrookdale
- Elevation: 354 ft (108 m)
- Time zone: UTC-5 (Eastern (EST))
  - Summer (DST): UTC-4 (EDT)
- Area codes: 610 and 484
- GNIS feature ID: 1181596

Morysville is an unincorporated community in Colebrookdale Township in Berks County, Pennsylvania, United States. Morysville is located at the intersection of Pennsylvania Route 562 and Farmington Avenue.
