= Ironstone Bridge =

- U.S. National Register of Historic Places
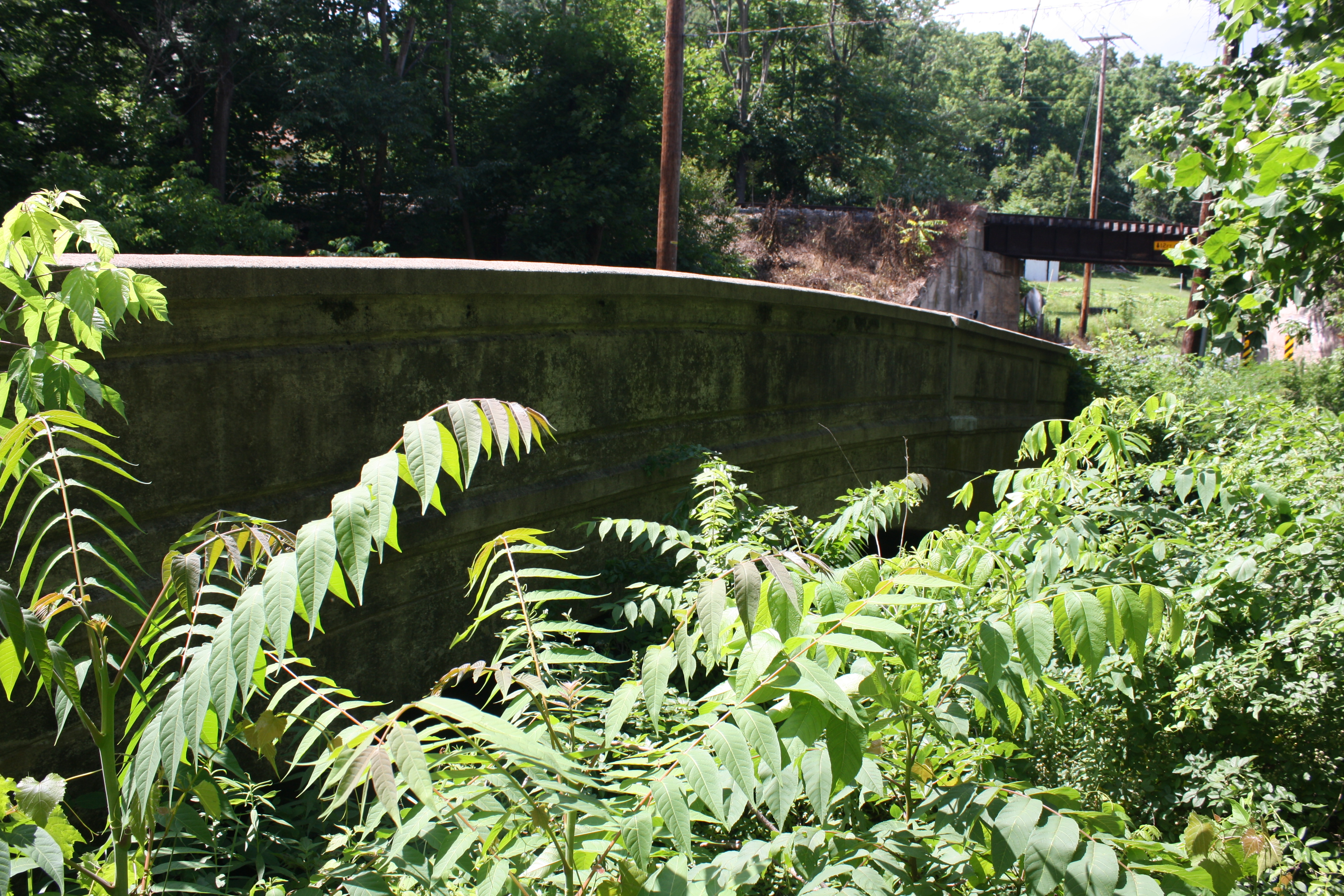
- Ironstone Bridge in Douglass Township, Pennsylvania, July 2013

- Location within Pennsylvania Location within the United States
- Location: Farmington Avenue over Ironstone Creek, Douglass Township, Pennsylvania
- Coordinates: 40°19′12″N 75°39′8″W
- Area: less than one acre
- Built: 1907
- Built by: N.M. Davis; Willauer & Co.
- Architectural style: Single span arch
- MPS: Highway Bridges Owned by the Commonwealth of Pennsylvania, Department of Transportation TR
- NRHP reference No.: 88000789
- Added to NRHP: June 22, 1988

Ironstone Bridge is a historic concrete arch bridge located at Douglass Township in Berks County, Pennsylvania. It is a single span 104-foot-long (32 m), concrete barrel arch bridge, constructed in 1907. It crosses Ironstone Creek.

It was listed on the National Register of Historic Places in 1988.
