= David R. Kessler =

American politician

Member of the Pennsylvania House of Representatives from the 130th district
- In office January 2, 2007 – November 30, 2010
- Preceded by: Dennis Leh
- Succeeded by: David Maloney

Personal details
- Born: 1957 (age 68–69) Phoenixville, Pennsylvania
- Party: Democratic
- Children: 2 children
- Education: York College

David R. Kessler is a Democratic politician and former member of the Pennsylvania House of Representatives for the 130th legislative district. He was elected in 2006. In 2010, he lost his second bid for re-election.

Kessler was a member of the Oley Township, Pennsylvania Board of Supervisors from 1993 to 2010. Prior to elective office, he was the owner of Tri-State Funding Inc., an equipment financing company.
