= Bahr Mill Complex =

- U.S. National Register of Historic Places
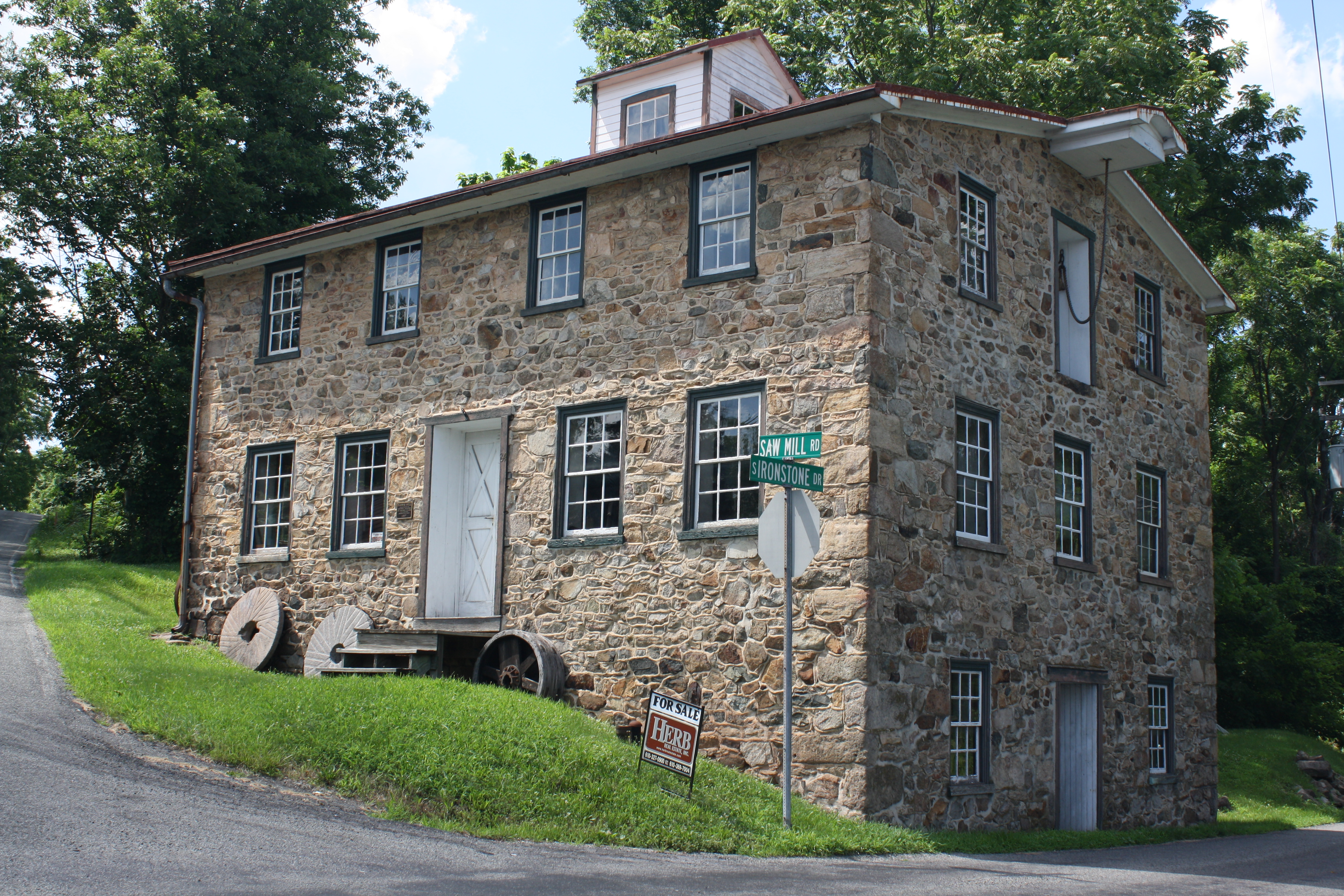
- Bahr Mill, July 2013

- Location within Pennsylvania Location within the United States
- Location: Ironstone Dr., Colebrookdale Township, Pennsylvania
- Coordinates: 40°20′19″N 75°39′31″W
- Area: 3 acres (1.2 ha)
- Built: 1897
- Architectural style: Gristmill
- MPS: Gristmills in Berks County MPS
- NRHP reference No.: 90001611
- Added to NRHP: November 8, 1990

Bahr Mill Complex is a historic grist mill complex located in Colebrookdale Township, Berks County, Pennsylvania. The complex includes the 2-story, plus basement, banked stone mill (1897); 2 2/2-story, stucco over stone farmhouse (c. 1820); 1-story, brick smokehouse (c. 1820); banked frame sawmill with a stone foundation (c. 1820); 2-story, stucco over stone store (c. 1820); two sheds (c. 1890); a shoemaker's shop (c. 1890); outhouse (c. 1920); stone bank barn (rebuilt c. 1880); and frame garage (c. 1930). Also on the property are a contributing chicken house (c. 1850) and pig sty (c. 1890). It is a family-run mill complex, run by the Gable family for over 175 years.

It was listed on the National Register of Historic Places in 1990.
