= John M. Schealer =

American novelist

John Milton Schealer (July 5, 1920 – February 11, 2008) was an American author of an elementary school astronomy textbook as well as numerous science fiction books for children.

Born in Boyertown, Pennsylvania, Schealer earned a B.A. from the University of Pennsylvania in 1943. He published his first children's book Zip-Zip and His Flying Saucer in 1956, the first of three science fiction books to feature spaceboy Zip-Zip.

In 1957, Schealer wrote This Way to the Stars, an astronomy textbook aimed at ten- to fourteen-year-old readers which discussed the history of astronomy.

Schealer also wrote the script for a sound and light festival for the Castillo de San Marcos National Monument in St. Augustine, Florida, and was also the founder and past executive vice-president of the Sound and Light Corporation of America.

== Works ==
Fiction:

- Zip-Zip and His Flying Saucer (1956)
- Zip-Zip Goes to Venus (1958)
- The Sycamore Warrior: A Mystery of Ancient Egypt (1960)
- Zip-Zip and the Red Planet (1961)

Non-fiction:

- This Way to the Stars (1957)
