= Dennis Leh =

American politician

Dennis E. Leh

Member of the Pennsylvania House of Representatives from the 130th district
- In office January 6, 1987 – November 30, 2006
- Preceded by: Lester Fryer
- Succeeded by: David Kessler

Personal details
- Born: January 4, 1946 (age 80) Pottstown, Pennsylvania
- Party: Republican
- Spouse: Columbia
- Children: 3 children
- Occupation: Tool & Diemaker & Small Businessman

Military service
- Allegiance: United States
- Branch/service: United States Army
- Years of service: 1965—1967
- Rank: Sergeant
- Unit: Military Police Corps

Dennis E. Leh (born January 4, 1946) is a Republican former member of the Pennsylvania House of Representatives. He was born in Pottstown.

== Biography ==
Leh is a 1964 graduate of Pottstown High School.

He served in the United States Army from 1965 to 1967, attaining the rank of sergeant in the Military Police Corps.

He completed a four-year Tool and die maker apprenticeship, and worked for Doehler-Jarvis, Farley Industries. He then became the owner of Leh Tool Service, and operated his business for twenty years.

In 1994, he proposed the three-strikes laws against persistent violent offenders.
