= Mertztown, Pennsylvania =

Unincorporated community in Pennsylvania, US

- Census-designated place
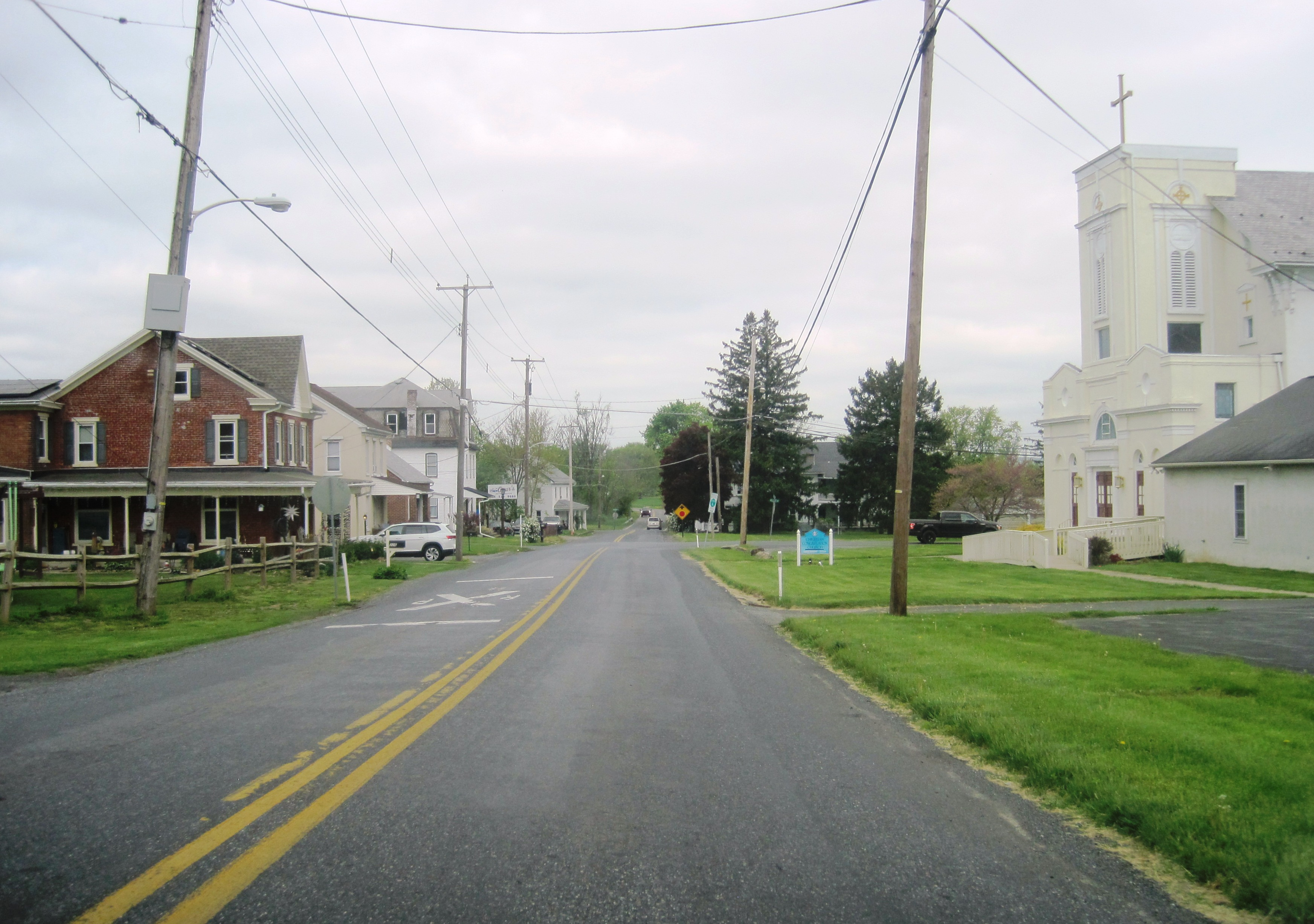
- Chestnut Street in Mertztown

- Location within Pennsylvania Location within the United States
- Coordinates: 40°30′21″N 75°39′56″W
- Country: United States
- State: Pennsylvania
- County: Berks
- Township: Longswamp Township Rockland Township

Area
  - Total: 1.06 sq mi (2.74 km^{2})
  - Land: 1.05 sq mi (2.72 km^{2})
  - Water: 0.0039 sq mi (0.01 km^{2})
- Elevation: 466 ft (142 m)

Population (2020)
  - Total: 600
  - Density: 570.4/sq mi (220.24/km^{2})
- Time zone: UTC-5 (Eastern (EST))
  - Summer (DST): UTC-4 (EDT)
- ZIP Code: 19539
- Area codes: 610 and 484
- FIPS code: 42-48824

Mertztown (Pennsylvania German: Mertzeschteddel) is a census-designated place in Longswamp Township in Berks County, Pennsylvania. It is located near the borough of Topton. As of the 2010 census, the population was 664 residents.

Mertztown is located in Berks County at latitude 40.506 and longitude -75.665. Its elevation is 466 feet. It appears on the United States Geological Survey map for Topton and is in the Eastern Time Zone (UTC-5).

The Reading Railroad which ran through Mertztown, was later acquired by Norfolk Southern as the Reading Line, and remains a heavily used railroad branch. A branch of the Catasauqua and Fogelsville Railroad once passed through the Farmington and Klines Corner section in Mertztown, but the tracks were later removed.

Mertztown was founded in 1823 by Robert Mertz. The population density is .01% Black, .01% Hispanic or other, and 99.8% white. Atlas Minerals, a major mineral company, is located in Mertztown. The company, which moved to Mertztown in 1917, has been based there ever since.

Mertztown is served by Brandywine Heights Area School District, which is based in Mertztown. Gateway Christian School is also located in Mertztown. The area code is 610. The Toad Creek runs east through the village from Topton into the Little Lehigh Creek.

Historical population
Census	Pop.	Note	%±
2020	600		—
U.S. Decennial Census

== Notable places ==
- Dorney Road Landfill, which was added to the Superfund National Priorities List by the U.S. Environmental Protection Agency in 1984 and later removed from the list in 2018.

== Notable people ==
- Charles F. Rabenold (1883–1968), architect
