= The Berks-Mont News =

Berks-Mont News
- Type: Weekly newspaper
- Owner(s): Digital First Media
- Publisher: Edward S. Condra
- Editor: Lisa Mitchell
- Founded: 1885 (as Birdsboro Dispatch)
- Headquarters: 390 Eagleview Boulevard; Exton, Pennsylvania, U.S.
- Circulation: 5,500
- Website: berksmontnews.com

Berks-Mont News is an American weekly paper published by Digital First Media. It has a circulation of 5,500 and primarily serves Boyertown, Pennsylvania. The paper is a conglomeration of several weeklies severing Berks and Montgomery Counties known as Berk-Mont Newspapers, which include Boyertown Area Times, Southern Berks News, The Community Connection, and TriCounty Record.

== History ==
The Berks-Mont News was founded as the Boyertown Area Times in 1885, combining several local weeklies. One of the oldest weeklies was the Boyertown Area Times, which was founded in 1885 as the Birdsboro Dispatch.

In 1908, H. E. Hart, who had founded the Birdsboro Review, purchased the Birdsboro Dispatch and eventually combined the papers under the Dispatch heading. Hart served as editor of the paper until his death in 1951. Hart published a scathing letter to the Pennsylvania State Department of Commerce secretary in 1955, who abruptly canceled the department's subscription to the Dispatch and requested a refund. Hart mailed the refund of 70 cents with the letter, that included the statement, "Frankly, John, until your letter arrived we weren't full aware of the extent of the commonwealth's financial difficulties...it never occurred to us that our 67 cents loomed so large."

From the early 1950s to the 1980s, the paper was associated with Jim Webb, who became editor in 1953 and publisher in 1964. One notable editor for the paper was Mary Jane Lentz (Schneider), who was editor from 1966 to 1989. During her tenure at the paper, she earned numerous awards from the International Society of Weekly Newspaper Editors, and served as its first female president. She also penned a two-volume history of the Rhodes Opera House fire. The fire killed 170 theater-goers and led to efforts to improve safety codes in public buildings.

The paper was acquired by the Journal Register Co in 2004. The bankruptcy and sale of the Journal Register Co. in 2012 led to the eventual purchase by Digital First Media.
