= Woodchoppertown, Pennsylvania =

Unincorporated community in Pennsylvania, U.S.

- Unincorporated community
- Interactive map of Woodchoppertown, Pennsylvania
- Coordinates: 40°20′55.34″N 75°43′1.68″W
- Country: United States
- State: Pennsylvania
- County: Berks
- Township: Earl
- Elevation: 581 ft (177 m)
- Time zone: UTC−5 (Eastern (EST))
  - Summer (DST): UTC−4 (EDT)
- GNIS feature ID: 1204985

Woodchoppertown is an unincorporated community located in Earl Township, Berks County, Pennsylvania, United States. It is located 13.7 miles from Reading and 11.9 miles from Pottstown.
