= Sally Ann Furnace Complex =

- U.S. National Register of Historic Places
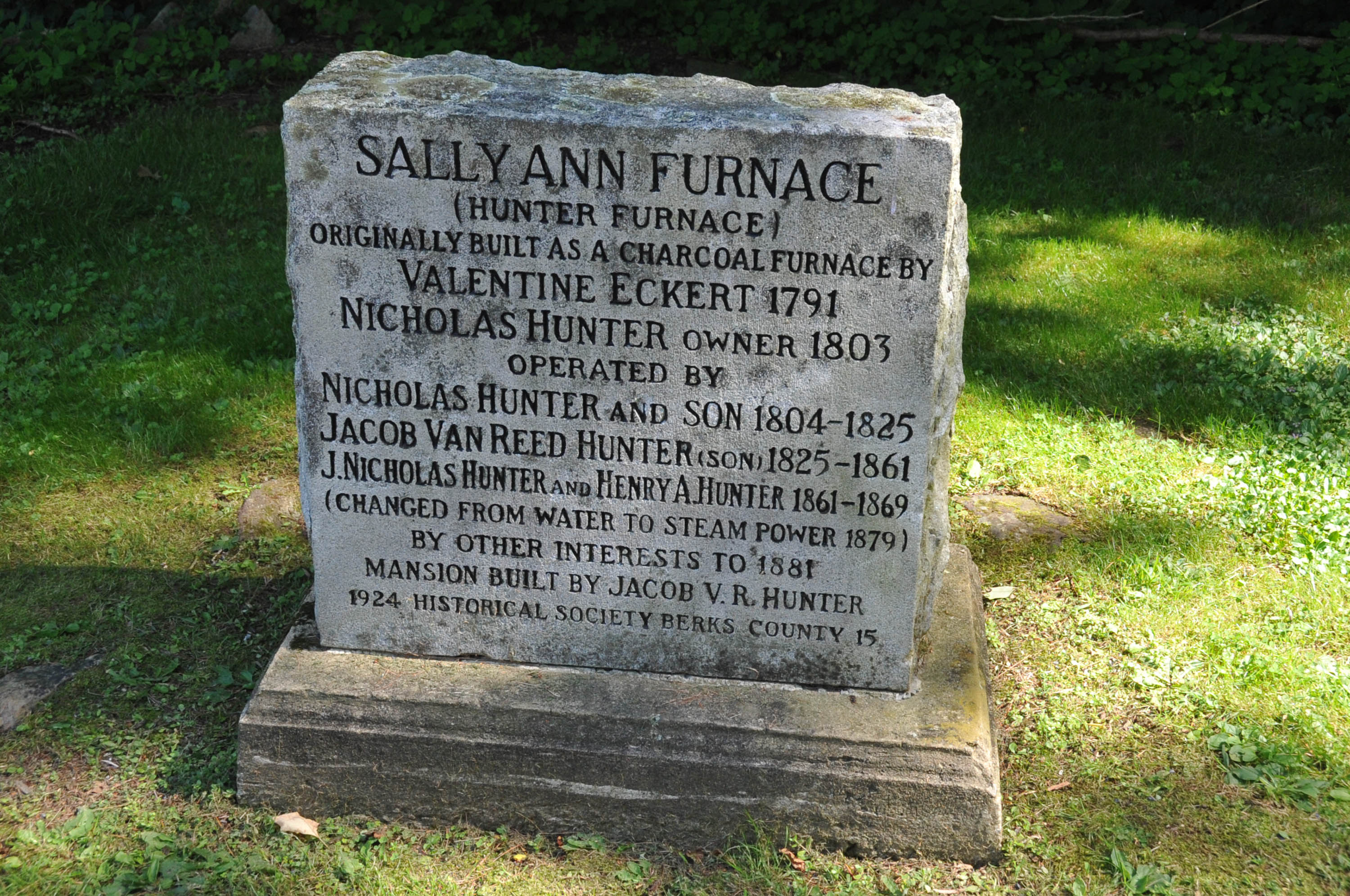

- Location within Pennsylvania Location within the United States
- Location: Southwest of Topton, Rockland Township, Pennsylvania
- Coordinates: 40°28′19″N 75°43′22″W
- Area: 5 acres (2.0 ha)
- Built: 1791, 1814, 1820
- Built by: Hunter, Jacob; Eckert, Valentine
- NRHP reference No.: 76001604
- Added to NRHP: August 17, 1976

The Sally Ann Furnace Complex is an historic iron furnace complex in Rockland Township, Berks County, Pennsylvania, United States.

It was added to the National Register of Historic Places in 1976.

== History and architectural features ==
This complex includes the remains of an historic iron furnace, barns, stable, storage sheds, grist mill, and bake ovens. The furnace was built in 1791 along Sacony Creek and once stood thirty-two feet high. Adjacent to the mill is a one-and-one-half-story stone dwelling that was built in 1798. In 1814, a two-and-one-half-story rectangular, stuccoed, stone mansion house was added. It is five bays by two bays, and has a gable roof with dormers. Also located on the property is a one-and-one-half-story, stone company store and storekeeper's residence, and a two-and-one-half-story stuccoed stone granary.

It was added to the National Register of Historic Places in 1976.
