= Pleasantville Bridge =

- U.S. National Register of Historic Places
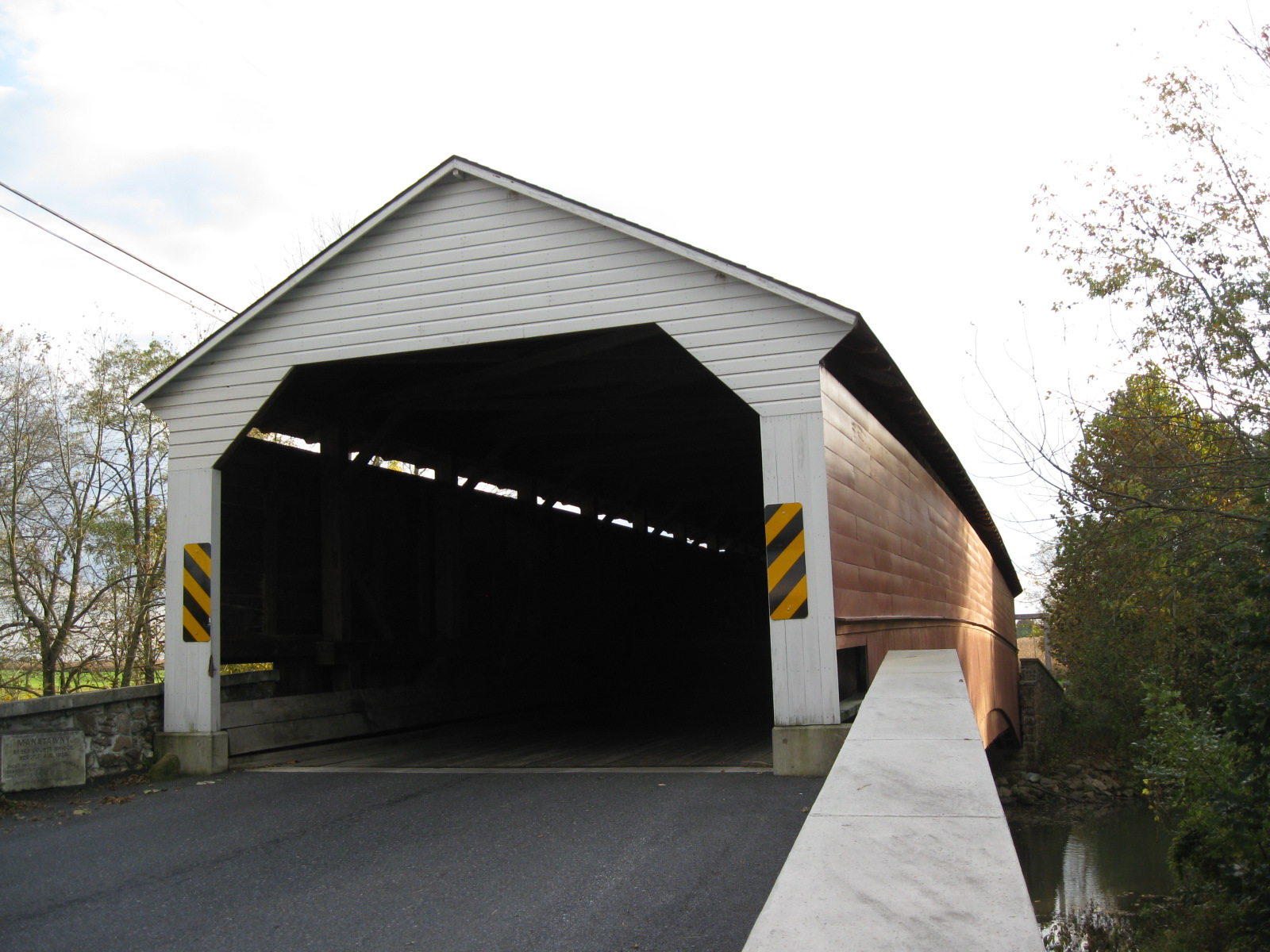
- Pleasantville Covered Bridge, October 2009

- Location within Pennsylvania Location within the United States
- Location: South of Mantawny on Township 916, Oley Township, Pennsylvania
- Coordinates: 40°22′44″N 75°44′21″W
- Area: less than one acre
- Built: 1852, 1856
- Built by: Renno, David; Bitner, Jonathan
- MPS: Berks County Covered Bridges TR
- NRHP reference No.: 81000533
- Added to NRHP: February 23, 1981

Pleasantville Bridge is a historic wooden covered bridge located at Oley Township in Berks County, Pennsylvania. It is a 126-foot-long (38 m), Burr Truss bridge, constructed between 1852 and 1856. It was built in two stages due to wood shortages after the Great Flood of 1850. It crosses the Manatawny Creek. It is one of five covered bridges remaining in Berks County.

It was listed on the National Register of Historic Places in 1981.

== Gallery ==
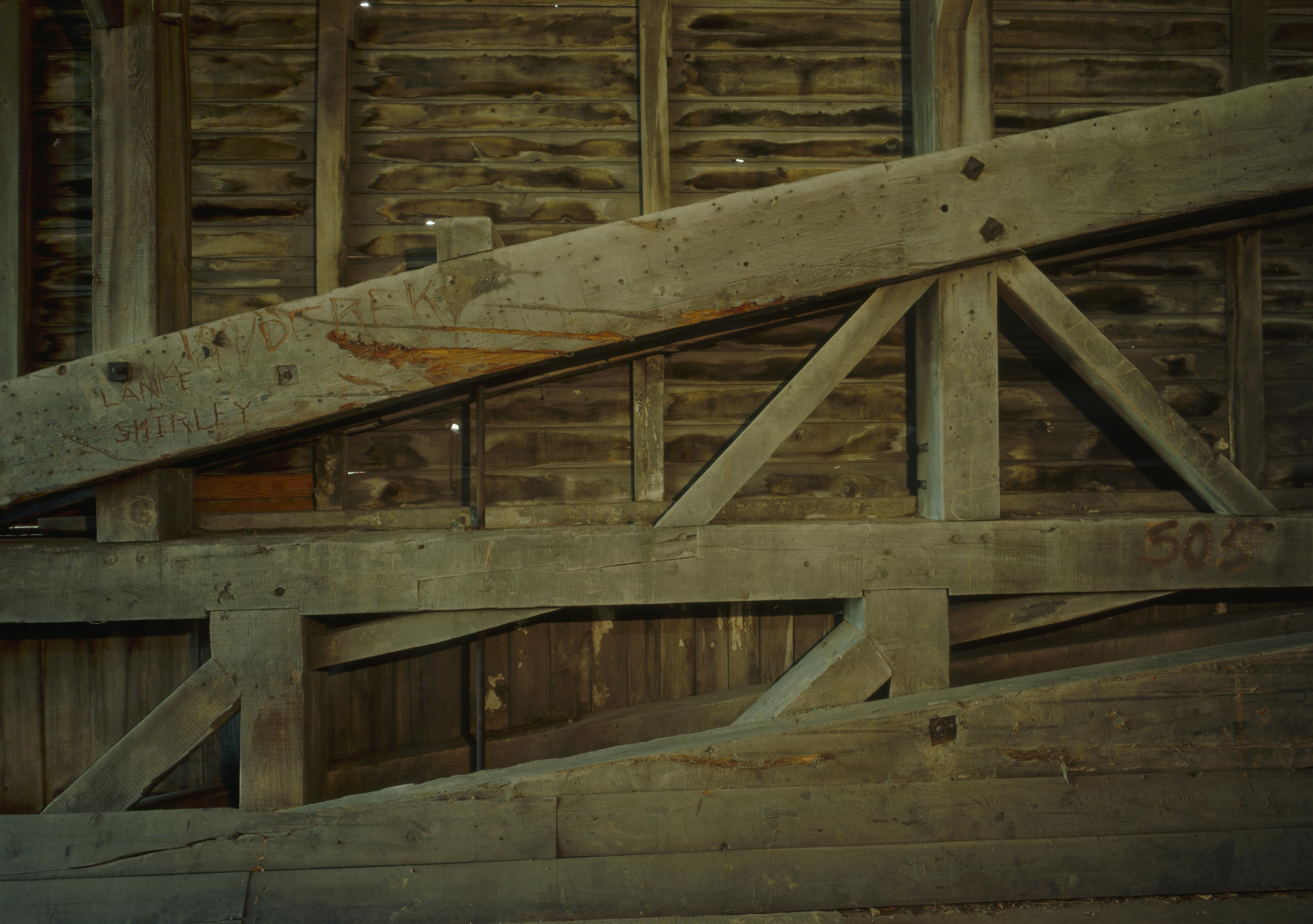
Pleasantville Covered Bridge detail, Summer 1999 (HAER Photo)

== See also ==
- List of bridges documented by the Historic American Engineering Record in Pennsylvania
