= Nicholas Johnson Mill =

- U.S. National Register of Historic Places
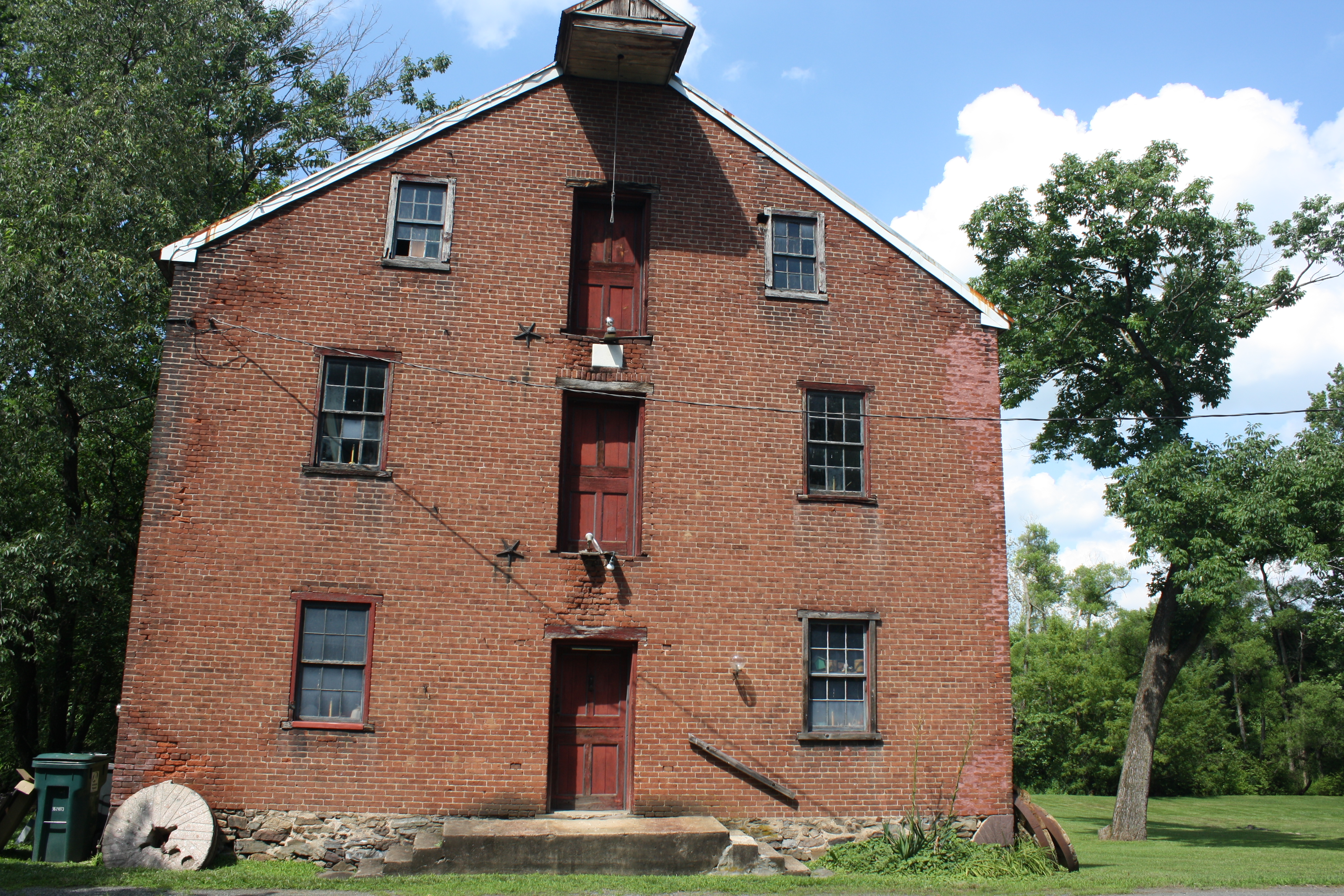
- Nicholas Johnson Mill. July 2013.

- Location within Pennsylvania Location within the United States
- Location: Mill Crest Rd., Colebrookdale Township, Pennsylvania
- Coordinates: 40°20′58″N 75°37′12″W
- Area: 4 acres (1.6 ha)
- Built: 1861
- MPS: Gristmills in Berks County MPS
- NRHP reference No.: 90001619
- Added to NRHP: November 8, 1990

The Nicholas Johnson Mill, also known as the Schollenberger Mill, is a historic American grist mill that is located in Colebrookdale Township, Berks County, Pennsylvania.

It was listed on the National Register of Historic Places in 1990.

== History and architectural features ==
The mill was built in 1861, and is a 2 1/2-story, brick building with a basement. Erected on a stone foundation, it measures thirty-six feet by forty feet and is three bays wide and four bays deep. Also located on the property are a 2 1/2-story, brick farmhouse that was built in 1838, a Switzer bank barn that was built circa 1850, a stone and log tenant house at dates to the early 1800s, and elements of a water power system.
