= Earl Township, Berks County, Pennsylvania =

Township in Pennsylvania, US

Earl Township
- Township
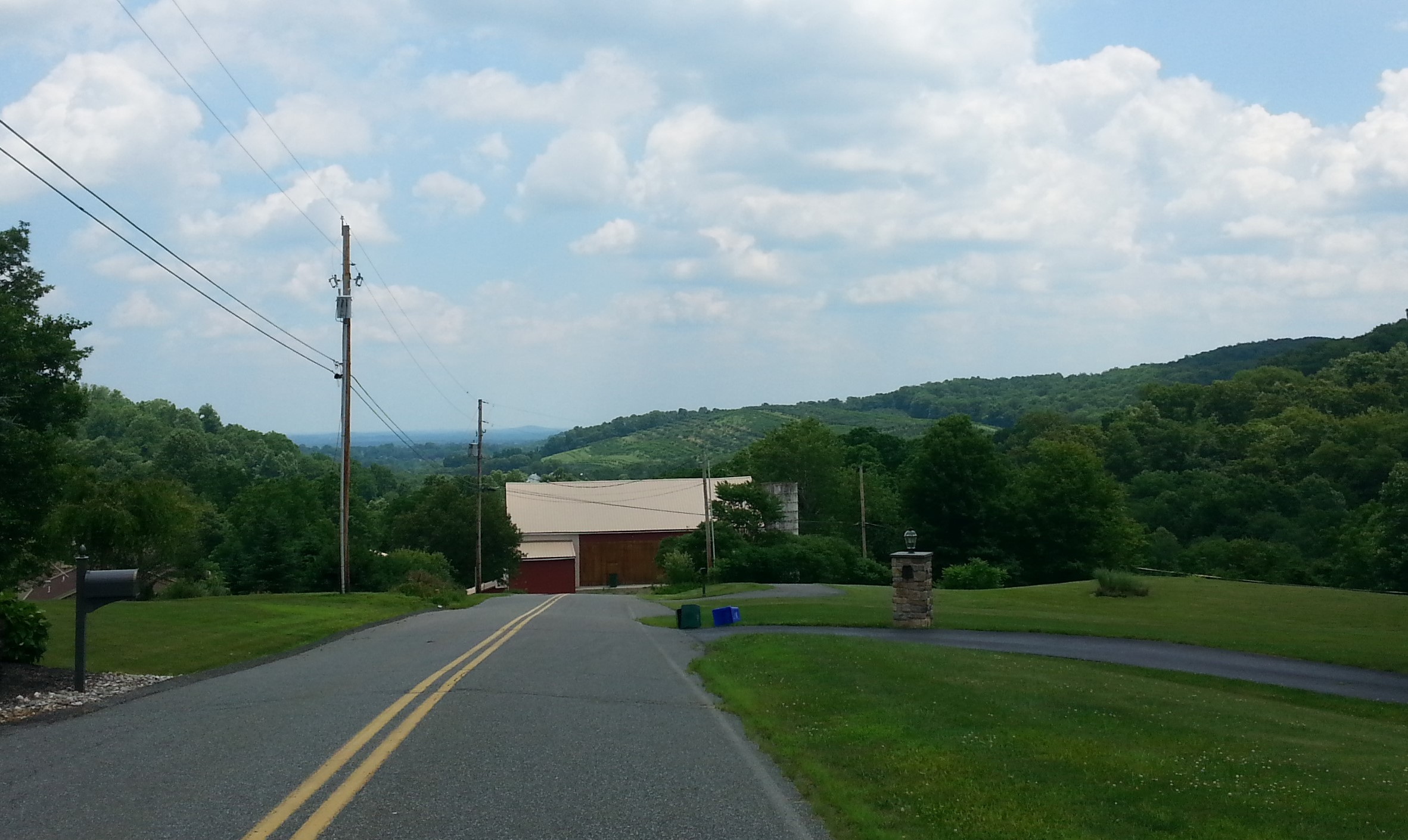
- Hillside vista in Earl Township

- Seal

- Location of Earl Township in Pennsylvania Earl Township (the United States)
- Coordinates: 40°22′36″N 75°42′29″W
- Country: United States
- State: Pennsylvania
- County: Berks

Area
  - Total: 13.82 sq mi (35.80 km^{2})
  - Land: 13.72 sq mi (35.54 km^{2})
  - Water: 0.10 sq mi (0.26 km^{2})
- Elevation: 577 ft (176 m)

Population (2020)
  - Total: 3,102 ▼
  - Estimate (2021): 3,096
  - Density: 235.0/sq mi (90.72/km^{2})
- Time zone: UTC-5 (EST)
  - Summer (DST): UTC-4 (EDT)
- Area code: 610
- FIPS code: 42-011-20680
- Website: earltwpberks.com

Earl Township is a township in Berks County, Pennsylvania, United States. The population was 3,102 at the 2020 census. Earl Township was named for early German settler Hans Graaf. His surname Graaf means "earl" in English.

== Geography ==
According to the U.S. Census Bureau, the township has a total area of 13.9 square miles (36 km^{2}), of which 13.8 square miles (36 km^{2}) is land and 0.1 square miles (0.26 km^{2}) (0.43%) is water. It is drained by the Schuylkill River mostly via the Manatawny Creek. Its villages include Earlville (also in Amity Township,) Shanesville, Woodchoppertown, and Worman.

Adjacent townships

- Oley Township (west)
- Pike Township (north)
- Colebrookdale Township (east)
- Douglass Township (southeast)
- Amity Township (south)

== Demographics ==
Historical population
Census	Pop.	Note	%±
1980	2,607		—
1990	3,016		15.7%
2000	3,050		1.1%
2010	3,195		4.8%
2020	3,102		−2.9%
2021 (est.)	3,096		−0.2%
Source: US Census Bureau

At the 2000 census, there were 3,050 people, 1,156 households, and 895 families living in the township. The population density was 221.1 inhabitants per square mile (85.4/km^{2}). There were 1,202 housing units at an average density of 87.1 per square mile (33.6/km^{2}). The racial makeup of the township was 98.13% White, 0.72% African American, 0.10% Native American, 0.23% Asian, 0.03% Pacific Islander, 0.43% from other races, and 0.36% from two or more races. Hispanic or Latino of any race were 0.72%.

There were 1,156 households, 33.0% had children under the age of 18 living with them, 67.4% were married couples living together, 5.5% had a female householder with no husband present, and 22.5% were non-families. 18.5% of households were made up of individuals, and 6.4% were one person aged 65 or older. The average household size was 2.63 and the average family size was 2.97.

The age distribution was 22.9% under the age of 18, 7.4% from 18 to 24, 31.4% from 25 to 44, 29.0% from 45 to 64, and 9.4% 65 or older. The median age was 39 years. For every 100 females, there were 106.6 males. For every 100 females age 18 and over, there were 105.7 males.

The median household income was $51,976 and the median family income was $60,363. Males had a median income of $39,861 versus $26,125 for females. The per capita income for the township was $22,527. About 1.3% of families and 3.7% of the population were below the poverty line, including 1.4% of those under age 18 and 13.1% of those age 65 or over.

== Transportation ==
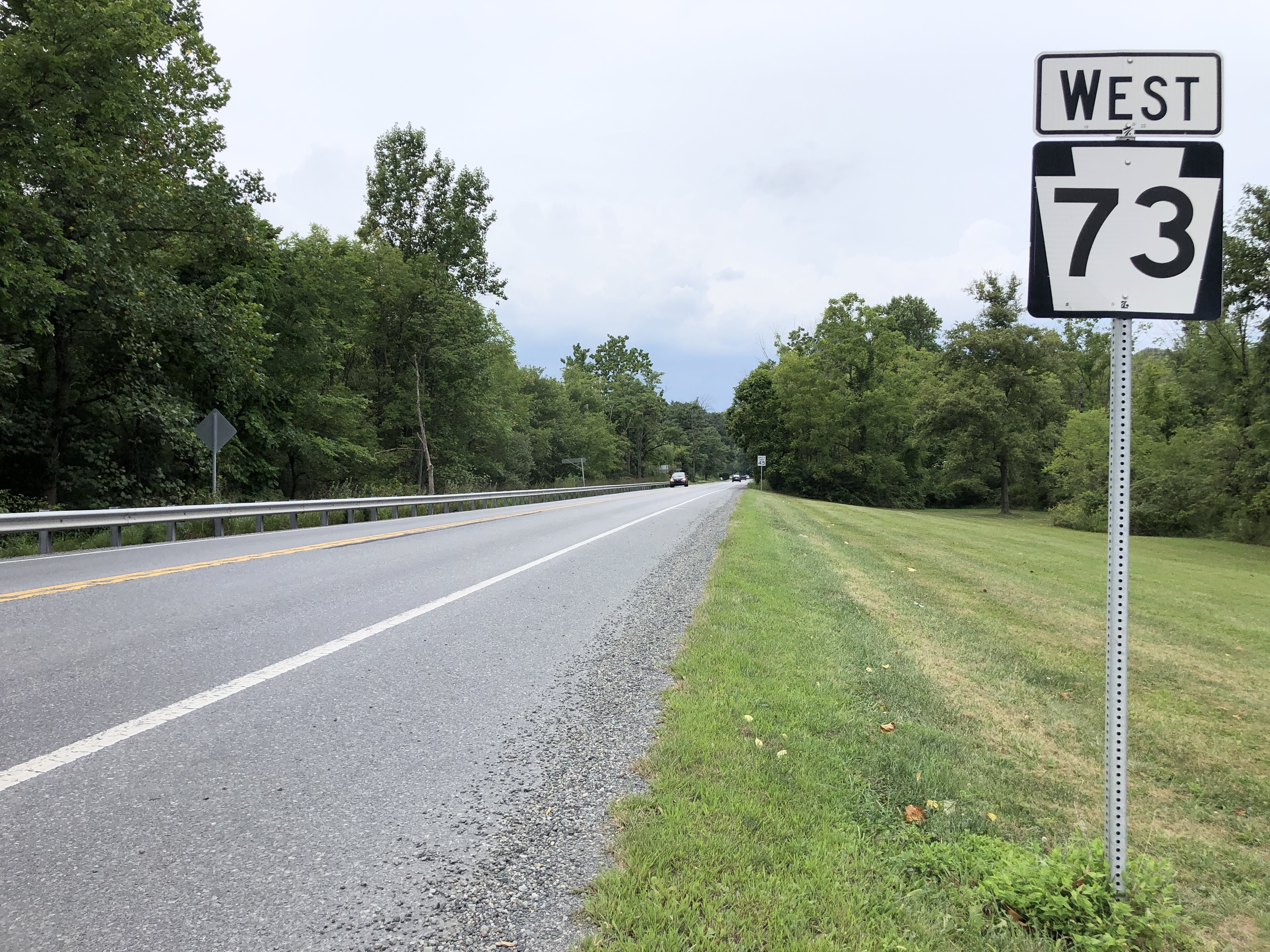
PA 73 westbound in Earl Township

As of 2019, there were 49.26 miles (79.28 km) of public roads in Earl Township, of which 14.49 miles (23.32 km) were maintained by the Pennsylvania Department of Transportation (PennDOT) and 34.77 miles (55.96 km) were maintained by the township.

Pennsylvania Route 73 and Pennsylvania Route 562 are the two numbered highways serving the township. PA 73 follows Philadelphia Avenue along a northwest-southeast alignment across the northern part of the township, while PA 562 follows Boyertown Pike along an east-west alignment across the southern edge of the township.
