= Sally Ann, Pennsylvania =

Unincorporated community in Pennsylvania, US

- Unincorporated community
- Location within Pennsylvania
- Coordinates: 40°28′20″N 75°43′36″W
- Country: United States
- State: Pennsylvania
- County: Berks
- Township: Rockland
- Elevation: 653 ft (199 m)
- Time zone: UTC-5 (Eastern (EST))
  - Summer (DST): UTC-4 (EDT)
- Area codes: 610 and 484
- GNIS feature ID: 1204578

Sally Ann is an unincorporated community in Rockland Township in Berks County, Pennsylvania, United States. Sally Ann is located at the intersection of Mine and Sally Ann Furnace Roads. It is served by the Mertztown post office with the ZIP code of 19539.
