= Brandywine Heights Area School District =

School district in Pennsylvania

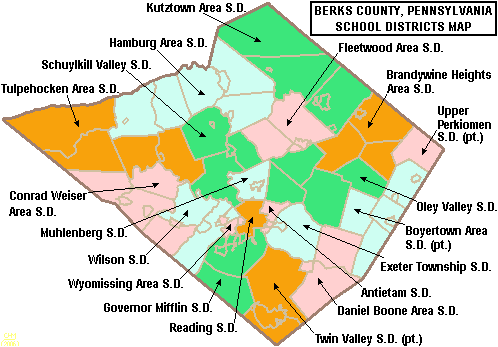
- Map school districts in Berks County, Pennsylvania

Address
- 200 West Weis Street Topton, Pennsylvania, 19562-1532; United States

District information
- Type: Public

Students and staff
- District mascot: Bullet
- Colors: Maroon, Gray, and Blue

Other information
- Website: www.bhasd.org

The Brandywine Heights Area School District is a small, rural public school district located in Berks County, Pennsylvania. It serves the borough of Topton and District, Longswamp and Rockland townships in Berks County.

Brandywine Heights Area School District encompasses approximately 59 square miles (150 km^{2}). According to 2010 federal census data, it serves a resident population of 12,876. In 2009, the district residents’ per capita income was $23,424, while the median family income was $58,993. In the Commonwealth, the median family income was $49,501 and the United States median family income was $49,445, in 2010.

The district operates: Brandywine Heights High School (9th–12th), Brandywine Heights Middle School (6th–8th), Brandywine Heights Intermediate School (4th–5th), and Brandywine Heights Elementary School (K–3rd).
