= Charles F. Rabenold =

American architect

- Born: 1883; Mertztown, Pennsylvania, U.S.
- Died: September 17, 1968 (aged 84–85); Glenside, Pennsylvania, U.S.
- Resting place: Hillside Cemetery and Memorial Gardens
- Education: University of Pennsylvania
- Occupation: Architect

Charles F. Rabenold (April 22, 1883 - September 17, 1968) was an American architect from Pennsylvania. According to The Philadelphia Inquirer, he "designed homes for many Philadelphia business leaders and many public buildings."
