= Ironstone Creek =

River in Manatawny Creek, Berks County, U.S.

Coordinates: 40°16′57″N 75°41′06″W

Ironstone Creek is an 9.0-mile-long (14.5 km) tributary of the Manatawny Creek in Berks County, Pennsylvania in the United States.

Ironstone Creek joins the Manatawny at Pine Forge.

== See also ==
- List of rivers of Pennsylvania
