= Colebrookdale Township, Pennsylvania =

Township in Pennsylvania, US

Colebrookdale Township
- Township
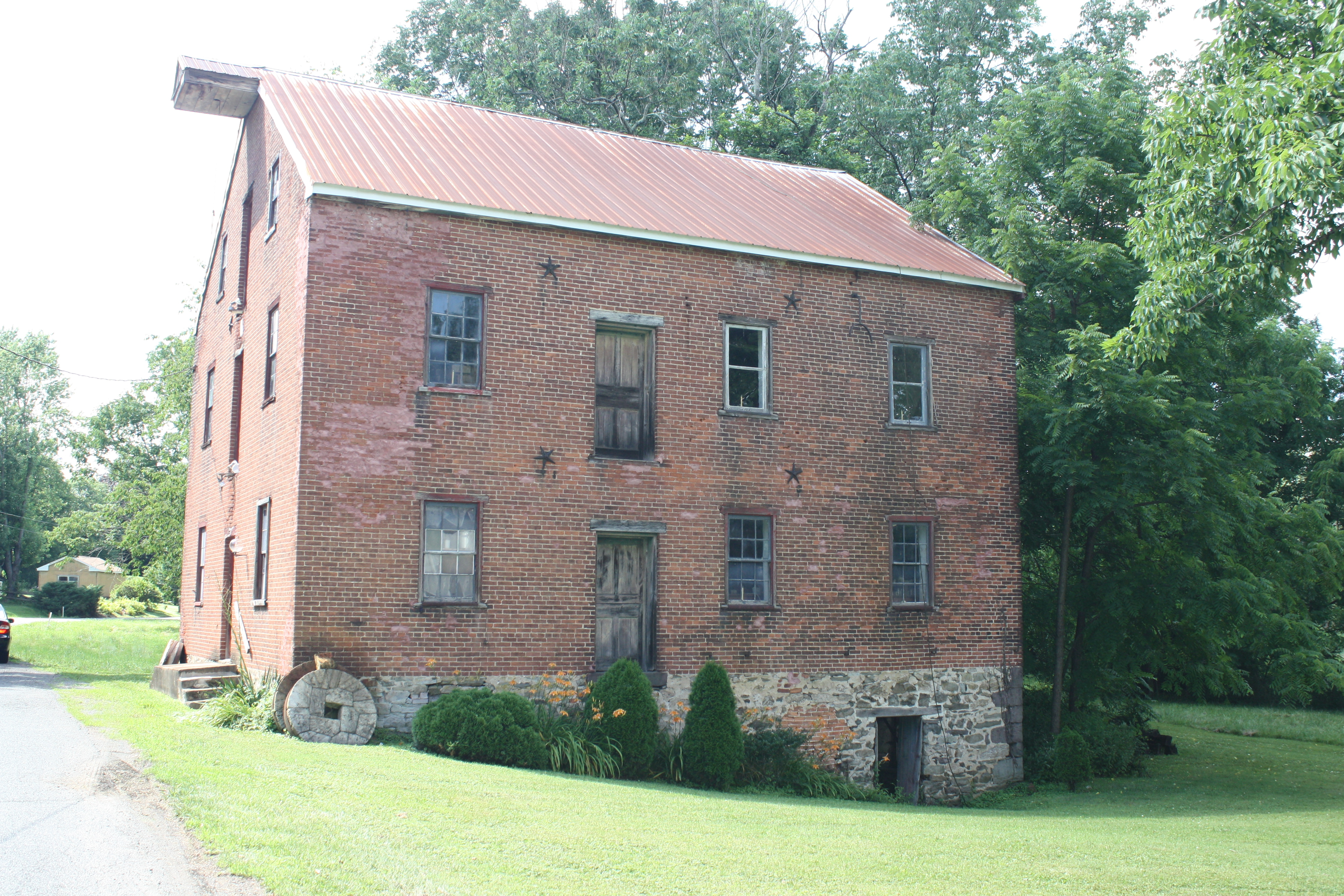
- Nicholas Johnson Mill, built 1861

- Logo

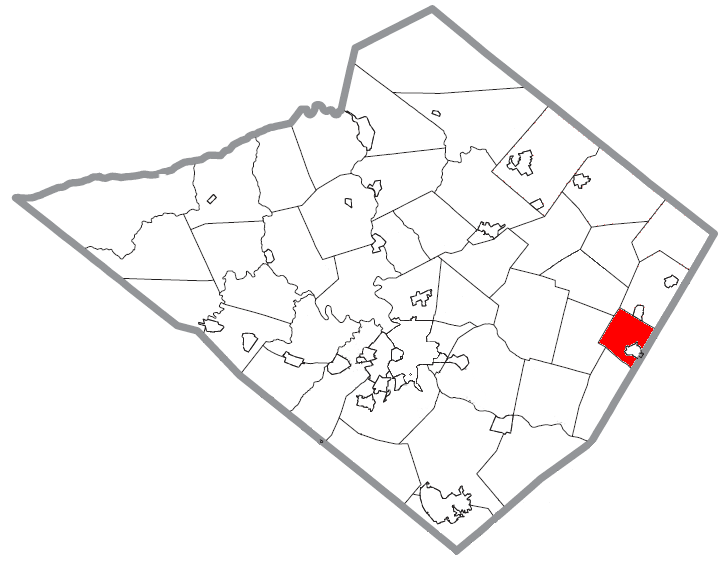
- Location of Colebrookdale Township in Berks County, Pennsylvania

- Location of Colebrookdale Township in Pennsylvania Colebrookdale Township (the United States)
- Coordinates: 40°20′30″N 75°37′19″W
- Country: United States
- State: Pennsylvania
- County: Berks

Area
  - Total: 8.46 sq mi (21.91 km^{2})
  - Land: 8.42 sq mi (21.81 km^{2})
  - Water: 0.035 sq mi (0.09 km^{2})
- Elevation: 338 ft (103 m)

Population (2020)
  - Total: 5,127
  - Estimate (2021): 5,122
  - Density: 599.9/sq mi (231.62/km^{2})
- Time zone: UTC-5 (EST)
  - Summer (DST): UTC-4 (EDT)
- Area code: 610
- FIPS code: 42-011-14984
- Website: colebrookdale.org

Colebrookdale Township is a township in Berks County, Pennsylvania, United States. The population was 5,127 at the 2020 census.

== History ==
The Bahr Mill Complex and Nicholas Johnson Mill were listed on the National Register of Historic Places in 1990.

== Geography ==
According to the U.S. Census Bureau, the township has a total area of 8.4 square miles (22 km^{2}), all land. It is drained by the Schuylkill River via the Manatawny Creek and tributaries of the Perkiomen Creek. The township's villages include Englesville (also in Montgomery County,) Gablesville, and New Berlinville.

=== Adjacent municipalities ===
- Douglass Township, Berks County (south)
- Earl Township (west)
- Pike Township (north)
- Washington Township (northeast)
- Douglass Township, Montgomery County (southeast)

Colebrookdale Township surrounds the borough of Boyertown on three sides.

== Transportation ==
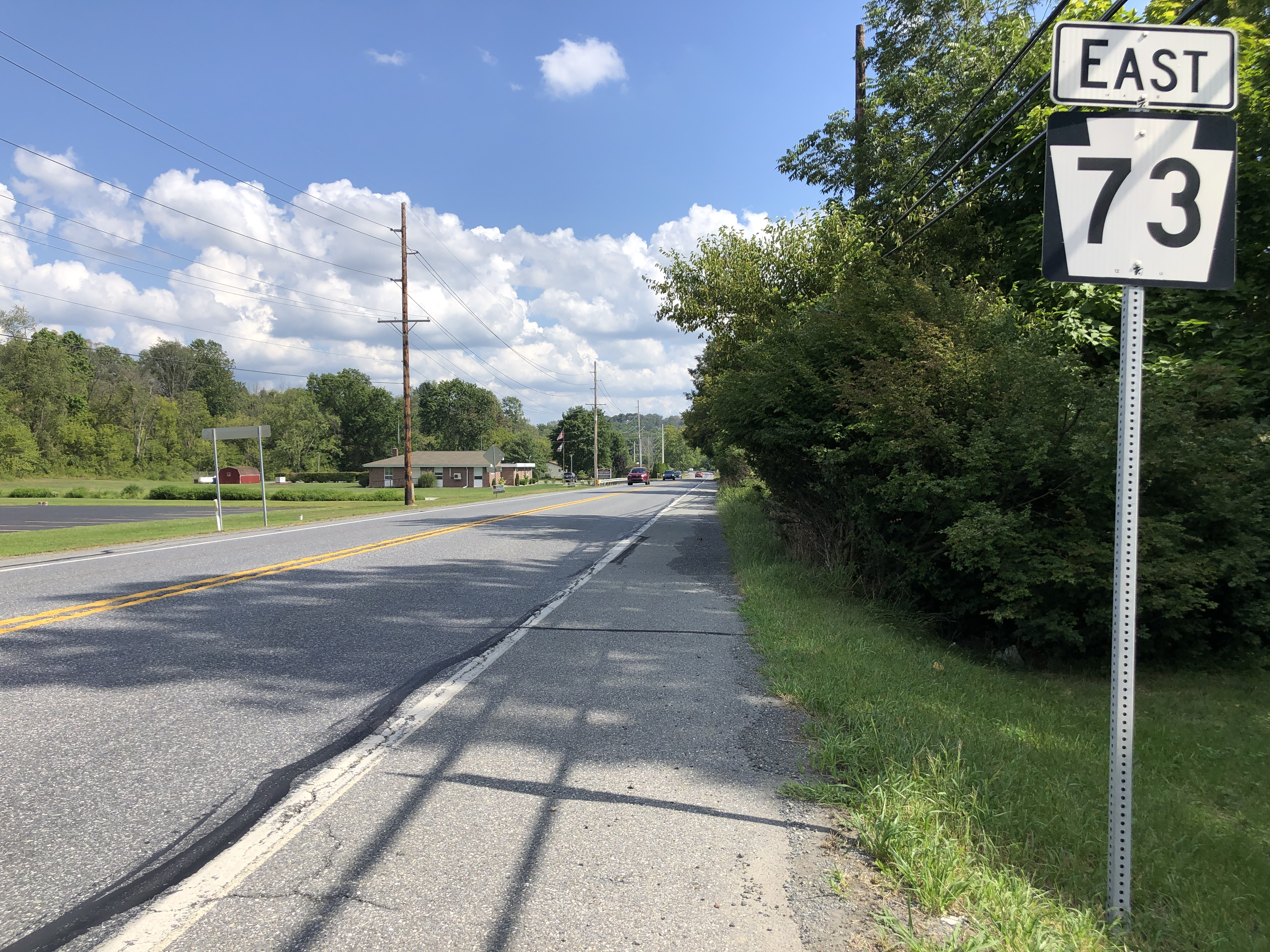
PA 73 eastbound in Colebrookdale Township

As of 2020, there were 44.21 miles (71.15 km) of public roads in Colebrookdale Township, of which 10.70 miles (17.22 km) were maintained by the Pennsylvania Department of Transportation (PennDOT) and 33.51 miles (53.93 km) were maintained by the township.

Pennsylvania Route 73, Pennsylvania Route 100 and Pennsylvania Route 562 are the numbered highways serving Colebrookdale Township. PA 73 follows Philadelphia Avenue along a northwest-southeast alignment across the western and southern portions of the township. PA 100 follows a north-south alignment across the eastern part of the township. Finally, PA 562 follows Reading Avenue along a southwest-northeast alignment in the southern part of the township.

== Demographics ==
Historical population
Census	Pop.	Note	%±
1980	4,748		—
1990	5,469		15.2%
2000	5,270		−3.6%
2010	5,078		−3.6%
2020	5,127		1.0%
2021 (est.)	5,122		−0.1%
Source: US Census Bureau

At the 2000 census, there were 5,270 people, 1,994 households, and 1,529 families living in the township. The population density was 629.3 inhabitants per square mile (243.0/km^{2}). There were 2,030 housing units at an average density of 242.4 per square mile (93.6/km^{2}). The racial makeup of the township was 98.69% White, 0.19% African American, 0.08% Native American, 0.34% Asian, 0.13% Pacific Islander, 0.08% from other races, and 0.49% from two or more races. Hispanic or Latino of any race were 0.34%.

There were 1,994 households, 33.0% had children under the age of 18 living with them, 64.4% were married couples living together, 8.0% had a female householder with no husband present, and 23.3% were non-families. 19.6% of households were made up of individuals, and 9.1% were one person aged 65 or older. The average household size was 2.64 and the average family size was 3.03.

The age distribution was 24.1% under the age of 18, 6.6% from 18 to 24, 30.6% from 25 to 44, 25.3% from 45 to 64, and 13.4% 65 or older. The median age was 39 years. For every 100 females there were 96.1 males. For every 100 females age 18 and over, there were 93.4 males.

The median household income was $54,238 and the median family income was $60,407. Males had a median income of $40,590 versus $26,764 for females. The per capita income for the township was $23,208. About 0.4% of families and 1.3% of the population were below the poverty line, including none of those under age 18 and 3.2% of those age 65 or over.
