= Douglass Township, Berks County, Pennsylvania =

Township in Pennsylvania, US

Douglass Township
- Township
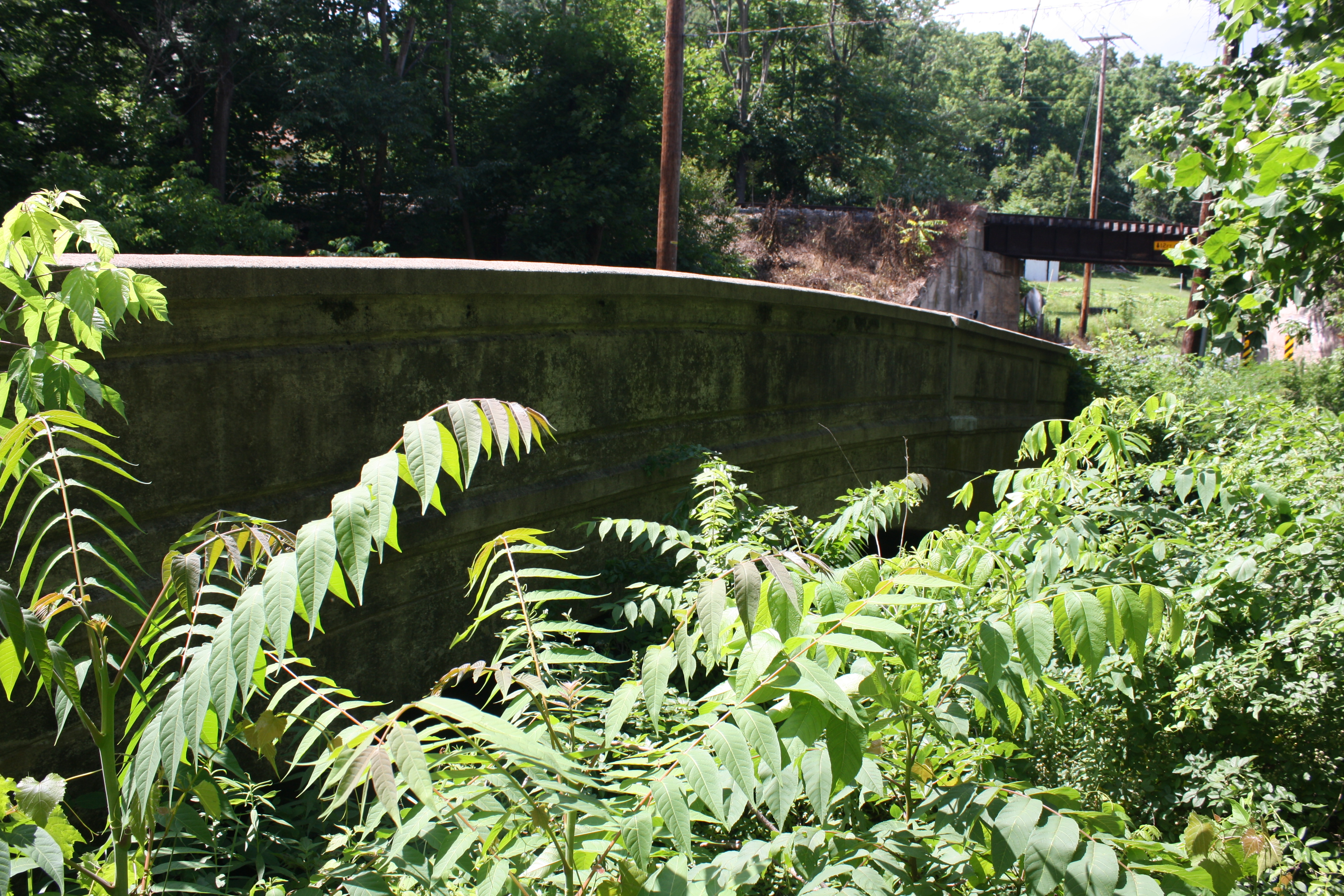
- Ironstone Bridge in Douglass Township

- Seal

- Location of Douglass Township in Berks County (left) and of Berks County in Pennsylvania (right)

- Location of Douglass Township in Pennsylvania Douglass Township (the United States)
- Coordinates: 40°17′23″N 75°40′47″W
- Country: United States
- State: Pennsylvania
- County: Berks

Area
  - Total: 12.74 sq mi (32.99 km^{2})
  - Land: 12.61 sq mi (32.67 km^{2})
  - Water: 0.13 sq mi (0.33 km^{2})
- Elevation: 249 ft (76 m)

Population (2020)
  - Total: 3,664 ▲
  - Estimate (2021): 3,683
  - Density: 282.7/sq mi (109.16/km^{2})
- Time zone: UTC-5 (EST)
  - Summer (DST): UTC-4 (EDT)
- Area code: 610
- FIPS code: 42-011-19664
- Website: douglassberks.org

Douglass Township is a township in Berks County, Pennsylvania, United States. The population was 3,664 at the 2020 census.

== History ==
The Ironstone Bridge and Pine Forge Mansion and Industrial Site are listed on the National Register of Historic Places.

== Geography ==
According to the U.S. Census Bureau, the township has a total area of 12.8 square miles (33 km^{2}), of which 12.7 square miles (33 km^{2}) is land and 0.04 square miles (0.10 km^{2}) (0.31%) is water.

Adjacent townships

- Colebrookdale Township (north)
- Douglass Township, Montgomery County (northeast)
- Upper Pottsgrove Township, Montgomery County (east)
- West Pottsgrove Township, Montgomery County (southeast)
- Union Township (south)
- Amity Township (west)
- Earl Township (northwest)

== Demographics ==
Historical population
Census	Pop.	Note	%±
1980	3,128		—
1990	3,570		14.1%
2000	3,327		−6.8%
2010	3,306		−0.6%
2020	3,664		10.8%
2021 (est.)	3,683		0.5%
Source: US Census Bureau

At the 2000 census, there were 3,327 people, 1,200 households, and 930 families living in the township. The population density was 261.6 inhabitants per square mile (101.0/km^{2}). There were 1,239 housing units at an average density of 97.4 per square mile (37.6/km^{2}). The racial makeup of the township was 89.18% White, 9.32% African American, 0.06% Native American, 0.42% Asian, 0.03% Pacific Islander, 0.21% from other races, and 0.78% from two or more races. Hispanic or Latino of any race were 0.60%.

There were 1,200 households, 31.5% had children under the age of 18 living with them, 68.0% were married couples living together, 6.4% had a female householder with no husband present, and 22.5% were non-families. 18.3% of households were made up of individuals, and 7.3% were one person aged 65 or older. The average household size was 2.65 and the average family size was 3.02.

The age distribution was 26.3% under the age of 18, 6.7% from 18 to 24, 28.5% from 25 to 44, 25.9% from 45 to 64, and 12.5% 65 or older. The median age was 39 years. For every 100 females there were 102.9 males. For every 100 females age 18 and over, there were 101.3 males.

The median household income was $52,306 and the median family income was $55,573. Males had a median income of $40,235 versus $24,764 for females. The per capita income for the township was $22,895. About 3.2% of families and 3.4% of the population were below the poverty line, including 3.2% of those under age 18 and none of those age 65 or over.

== Current Government and School District ==
The area is served by the Boyertown Area School District.

Emergency services are provided by the Douglass Township Police Department, Boyertown Area Fire and Rescue (North Sector), Amity Fire Company(South Sector), and Boyertown EMS (North Sector) and Goodwill of Pottstown (South Sector), all of which are dispatched by the Berks County Communications Center.

== Transportation ==
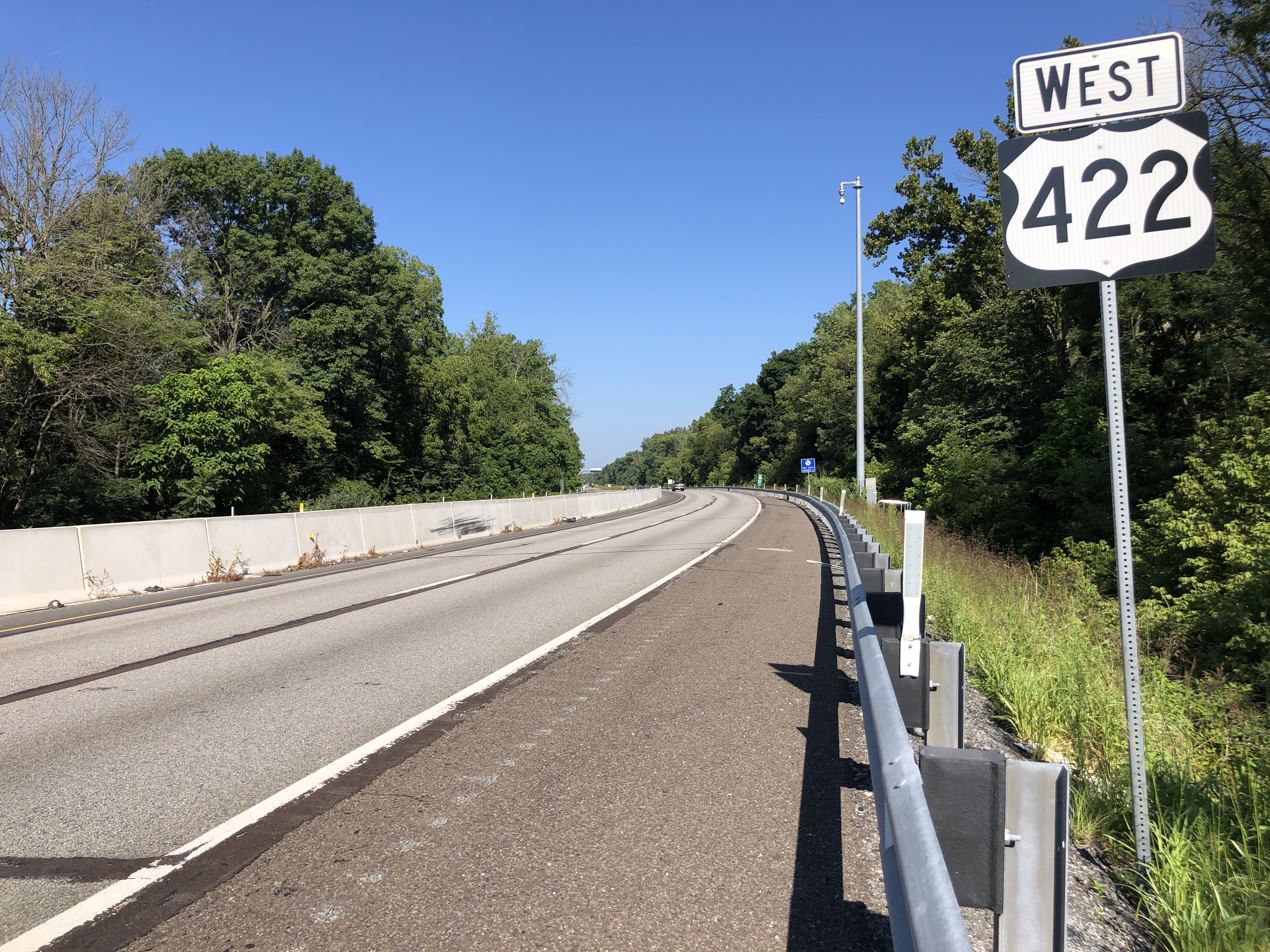
US 422 westbound in Douglass Township

As of 2019, there were 47.26 miles (76.06 km) of public roads in Douglass Township, of which 14.90 miles (23.98 km) were maintained by the Pennsylvania Department of Transportation (PennDOT) and 32.36 miles (52.08 km) were maintained by the township.

U.S. Route 422 is the most prominent highway serving Douglass Township. It follows the Pottstown Expressway along a northwest-southeast alignment across the southern part of the township. The only other numbered highway serving the township is Pennsylvania Route 562, which follows Reading Avenue along an east-west alignment across the northern part of the township.
