= David Maloney (politician) =

American politician (born 1960)

David M. Maloney

Member of the Pennsylvania House of Representatives from the 130th district
- Incumbent
- Assumed office January 4, 2011
- Preceded by: David R. Kessler

Personal details
- Born: August 25, 1960 (age 66) Lansdale, Pennsylvania, U.S.
- Party: Republican
- Spouse: Deborah D.
- Children: 4

David M. Maloney Sr. (born August 25, 1960) is an American politician from the Commonwealth of Pennsylvania. A member of the Republican Party, he is a member of the Pennsylvania House of Representatives from the 130th District.

== Early life ==
Maloney was born on August 25, 1960, in Lansdale, Pennsylvania. He graduated from Boyertown High School in 1978.

== Career ==
A carpenter by trade, Maloney served on the Oley Valley School Board from 2006 to 2009.

In 2010, was elected to represent the 130th District in the Pennsylvania House of Representatives. He was re-elected to six more consecutive terms.

In 2020, Maloney was among 26 Pennsylvania House Republicans who called for the reversal of Joe Biden's certification as the winner of Pennsylvania's electoral votes in the 2020 United States presidential election, citing false claims of election irregularities.

In 2023, Maloney was assigned Republican chairman of the House Game and Fisheries Committee for the 2023-24 Legislative Session.

On September 8, 2026, 12 days after U.S. president Donald Trump signed an executive order changing the name of Lake Ontario to "Lake America", Maloney announced that he was preparing a resolution to urge the U.S. president, Congress, and Secretary of the Interior to change the name of Lake Erie to "Lake Pennsylvania."

== Personal life ==
Maloney and his wife Deborah D., live in Pike Township, Berks County, Pennsylvania. They have four children and seven grandchildren.
