= Boyertown, Pennsylvania =

Borough in Pennsylvania, US

Boyertown Boyerschteddel
- Borough
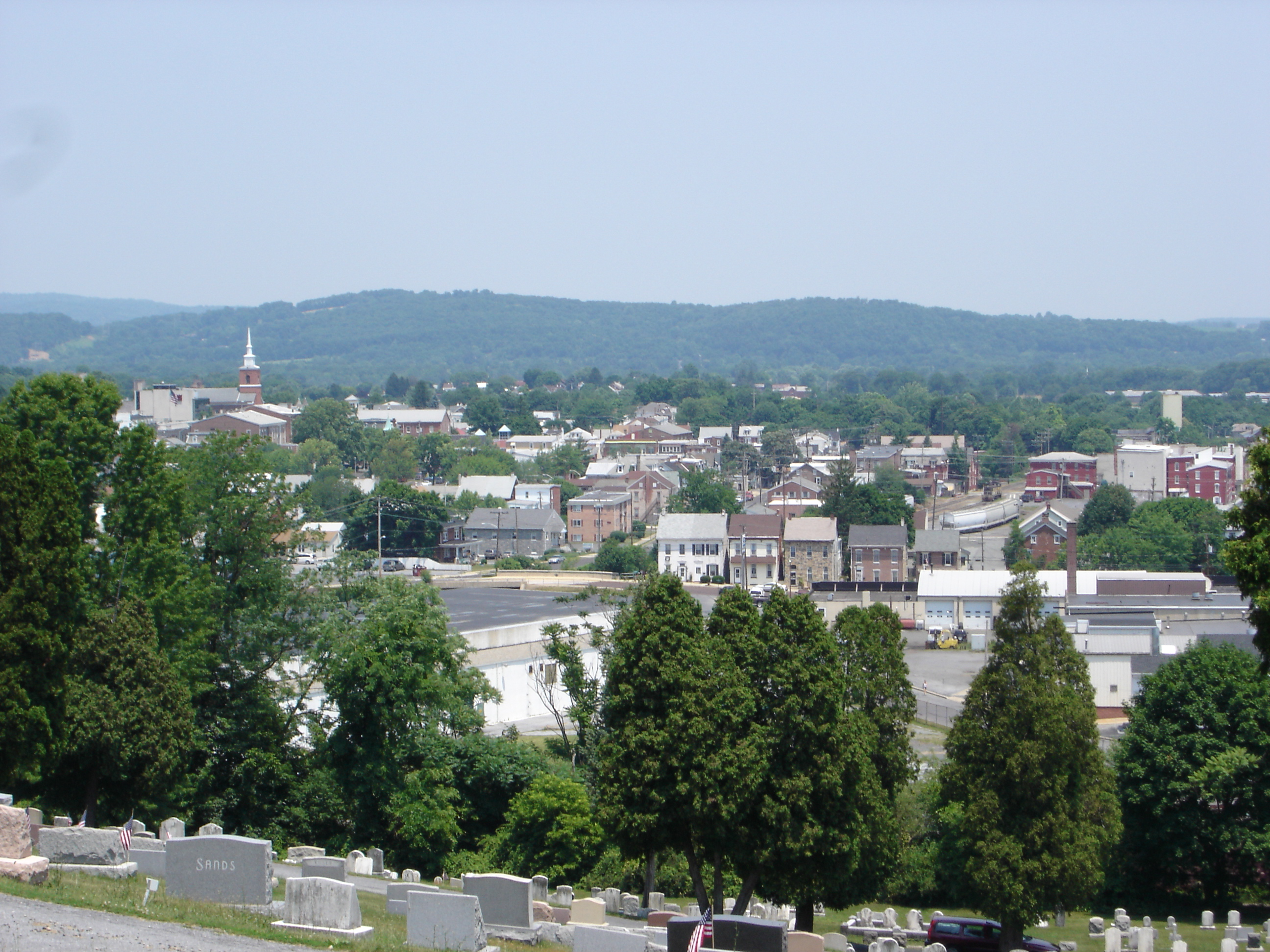
- Boyertown viewed from atop Cannon Hill

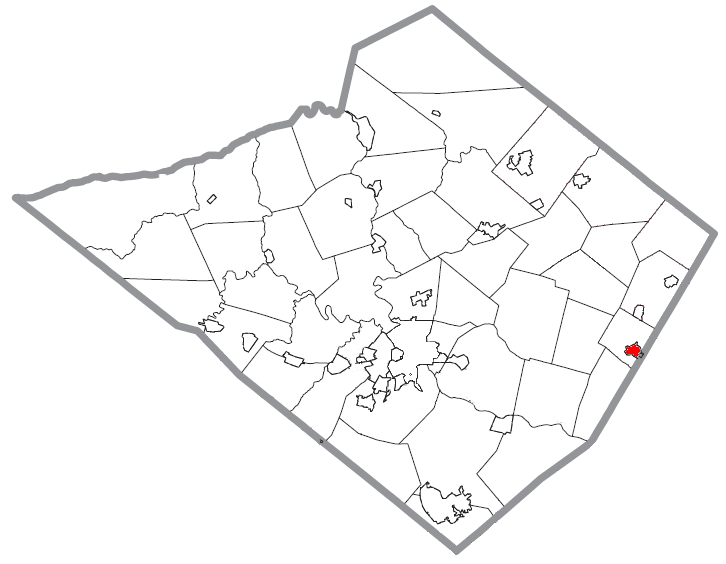
- Location of Boyertown in Berks County, Pennsylvania

- Location of Boyertown in Pennsylvania
- Coordinates: 40°19′53″N 75°38′10″W
- Country: United States
- State: Pennsylvania
- County: Berks

Area
  - Total: 0.77 sq mi (2.00 km^{2})
  - Land: 0.77 sq mi (2.00 km^{2})
  - Water: 0 sq mi (0.00 km^{2})
- Elevation: 407 ft (124 m)

Population (2020)
  - Total: 4,264
  - Density: 5,514.0/sq mi (2,128.96/km^{2})
- Time zone: UTC-5 (EST)
  - Summer (DST): UTC-4 (EDT)
- ZIP Code: 19512
- Area code: 610
- FIPS code: 42-07960
- Website: boyertownborough.org

Boyertown (Pennsylvania Dutch: Boyerschteddel) is a borough in Berks County, Pennsylvania, United States. The population was 4,264 at the 2020 census.

== History ==
A post office called Boyertown has been in operation since 1828. The community was named for its founders, brothers Henry and Daniel Boyer.

In 1908, Boyertown was the site of the Rhoads Opera House fire.

== Geography ==
Boyertown is located along the southeastern border of Berks County. It is bordered on the north, west, and south by Colebrookdale Township, and to the southeast by Douglass Township in Montgomery County.

Boyertown is included in the Reading metropolitan statistical area, which is part of the Philadelphia metropolitan area.

According to the U.S. Census Bureau, Boyertown has a total area of 0.77 square miles (2.0 km^{2}), all land. It has a hot-summer humid continental climate (Dfa) and average monthly temperatures range from 30.0 °F in January to 74.7 °F in July. The hardiness zone is 6b.

== Demographics ==
Historical population
Census	Pop.	Note	%±
1870	690		—
1880	1,099		59.3%
1890	1,436		30.7%
1900	1,709		19.0%
1910	2,433		42.4%
1920	3,189		31.1%
1930	3,943		23.6%
1940	3,983		1.0%
1950	4,074		2.3%
1960	4,067		−0.2%
1970	4,428		8.9%
1980	3,979		−10.1%
1990	3,759		−5.5%
2000	3,940		4.8%
2010	4,055		2.9%
2020	4,264		5.2%

=== 2020 census ===
As of the 2020 census, Boyertown had a population of 4,264. The median age was 41.6 years. 20.5% of residents were under the age of 18 and 21.3% of residents were 65 years of age or older. For every 100 females there were 94.5 males, and for every 100 females age 18 and over there were 91.4 males age 18 and over.

100.0% of residents lived in urban areas, while 0.0% lived in rural areas.

There were 1,954 households in Boyertown, of which 25.0% had children under the age of 18 living in them. Of all households, 33.5% were married-couple households, 24.7% were households with a male householder and no spouse or partner present, and 33.4% were households with a female householder and no spouse or partner present. About 39.7% of all households were made up of individuals and 18.4% had someone living alone who was 65 years of age or older.

There were 2,062 housing units, of which 5.2% were vacant. The homeowner vacancy rate was 0.4% and the rental vacancy rate was 5.4%.

Racial composition as of the 2020 census
Race	Number	Percent
White	3,945	92.5%
Black or African American	60	1.4%
American Indian and Alaska Native	4	0.1%
Asian	29	0.7%
Native Hawaiian and Other Pacific Islander	2	0.0%
Some other race	59	1.4%
Two or more races	165	3.9%
Hispanic or Latino (of any race)	139	3.3%

=== 2000 census ===
As of the 2000 census, there were 3,940 people, 1,805 households, and 1,025 families residing in the borough. The population density was 4,941.7 inhabitants per square mile (1,908.0/km^{2}). There were 1,885 housing units at an average density of 2,364.2 per square mile (912.8/km^{2}). The racial makeup of the borough was 98.83% White, 0.20% African American, 0.03% Native American, 0.36% Asian, 0.13% from other races, and 0.46% from two or more races. Hispanic or Latino of any race were 0.74% of the population.

There were 1,805 households, out of which 24.2% had children under the age of 18 living with them, 44.4% were married couples living together, 8.5% had a female householder, and 43.2% were non-families. 37.5% of all households were made up of individuals, and 19.3% had someone living alone who was 65 years of age or older. The average household size was 2.17 and the average family size was 2.87.

In the borough, the population was spread out, with 21.1% under the age of 18, 7.5% from 18 to 24, 29.2% from 25 to 44, 21.0% from 45 to 64, and 21.2% who were 65 years of age or older. The median age was 40 years. For every 100 females there were 92.5 males. For every 100 females age 18 and over, there were 87.7 males.

The median income for a household in the borough was $39,232, and the median income for a family was $52,943. Males had a median income of $33,783 versus $26,507 for females. The per capita income for the borough was $21,194. About 3.6% of families and 6.0% of the population were below the poverty line, including 5.6% of those under age 18 and 7.5% of those age 65 or over.

== Transportation ==
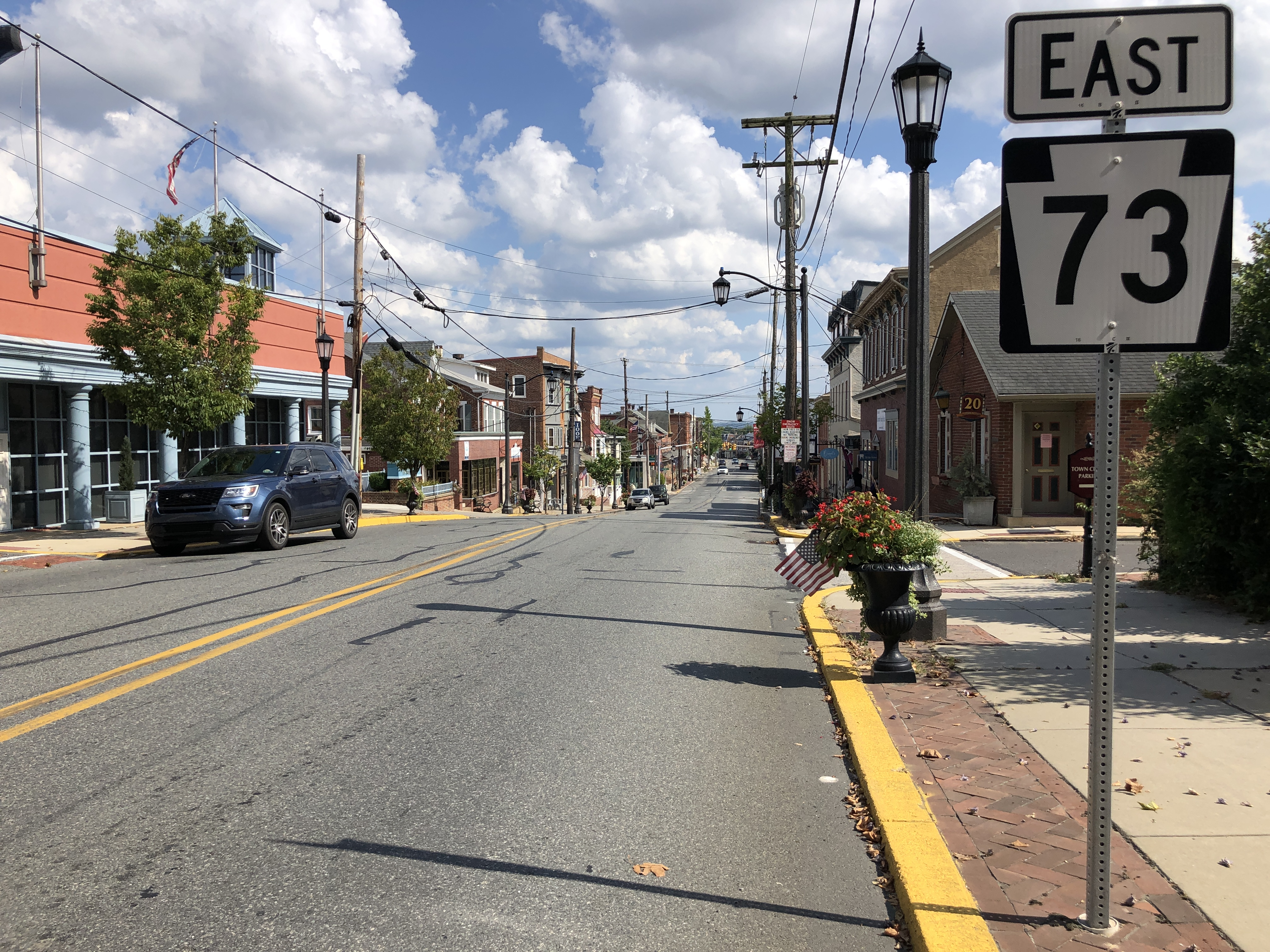
PA 73 eastbound in Boyertown

As of 2020, there were 12.82 miles (20.63 km) of public roads in Boyertown, of which 1.91 miles (3.07 km) were maintained by the Pennsylvania Department of Transportation (PennDOT) and 10.91 miles (17.56 km) were maintained by the borough.

Pennsylvania Route 73 (Philadelphia Avenue) is the main east–west road through the borough. It leads east-southeast to Schwenksville and eventually Northeast Philadelphia. To the northwest it leads to Blandon north of Reading. Pennsylvania Route 562 (Reading Avenue) leads west to Reading proper. Pennsylvania Route 100 bypasses the borough just outside its eastern border, leading north to Macungie near Allentown and south into Pottstown. A railroad line runs south from Boyertown to Pottstown. This line is used by the Colebrookdale Railroad tourist line and the Eastern Berks Gateway Railroad freight line.

== Public education ==
The borough is served by the Boyertown Area School District. This includes one senior high school, two middle schools, six elementary schools, and a cyber school program.

== Media ==
The area is served by The Berks-Mont News, a weekly paper with a circulation of 5,500.

== Landmarks ==
- Cabot Corporation
- Rhoads Opera House

== Notable people ==
- Steve Burns, former Blue's Clues host, actor, musician
- James Develin, former professional football player, New England Patriots
- Elaine Irwin Mellencamp, former Victoria's Secret model, ex-wife of rock musician John Mellencamp
- John M. Schealer, children's science fiction author
- Mark Soper, actor
- Carl Spaatz, U.S. Army general during World War II
- Michael E. Wegscheider, US Army major general
- Trey Yesavage, starting pitcher, Toronto Blue Jays

== Sister cities ==
Boyertown has one sister city, as designated by Sister Cities International:

- - Bohodukhiv, Kharkivs'ka (Kharkiv), Ukraine
