= Manatawny Creek =

River in Pennsylvania, USA

Coordinates: 40°14′33″N 75°39′32″W

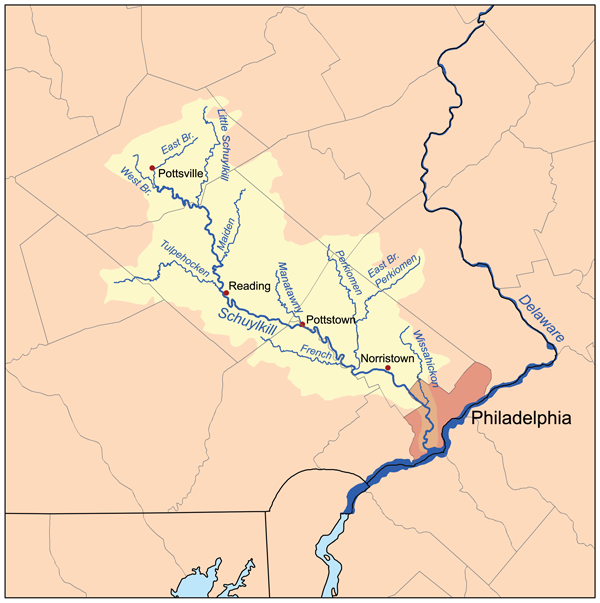
Schuylkill River watershed. Manatawny Creek joins the river near Pottstown in the map.

Manatawny Creek is an 18.2-mile-long (29.3 km) tributary of the Schuylkill River in Pennsylvania in the United States.

== Etymology ==
The name of the creek comes from the Lenape (or Delaware Indian) term Man'en'tau'wata'wik. Some early sources state that the term translates to "where we drank liquor", but later sources disagree with that interpretation, putting the meaning closer to "here we drink" or "drink-at-uninhabited-place," without reference to liquor.

== Course ==
The tributary Ironstone Creek joins the Manatawny at Pine Forge. Manatawny Creek is formed by the confluence of Bieber Creek and Pine Creek just below Lobachsville.

Manatawny Creek joins the Schuylkill River at Pottstown in Montgomery County.

== History ==
Manatawny Creek Dam was located about 500 meters upstream of where Manatawny Creek joins with the Schuylkill river. A low-head dam, it was built around 1850, but by 1999 had been legally declared as orphaned with no legal owner. It was removed in 2002, which allowed Manatawny Creek and its tributaries to be removed from the state’s 303(d) list.

== Bridges ==
- The Pleasantville Bridge crosses Manatawny Creek at Oley Township in Berks County.

== See also ==
- List of rivers of Pennsylvania
