= List of the oldest buildings in Pennsylvania =

This article lists the oldest extant buildings in the state of Pennsylvania in the United States, including the oldest houses in the state and certain other extant structures. Some dates are approximate, based upon dendrochronology, architectural studies, and historical records. Sites on the list are generally from the First Period of American architecture or earlier.

All listed sites either date from prior to 1776, or are the oldest building in their county or large city, or are the oldest of their type (for example: churches, schools, firehouses, or government buildings).

Name	Image	Location	Year	Type	Notes
Lower Swedish Cabin		Upper Darby, Drexel Hill	c. 1640–50	Cabin	Possibly oldest log cabin or wooden house in Pennsylvania. Built by Swedish Settlers.
Boelson Cottage		Philadelphia, Fairmount Park	c. 1678–84	House	Oldest structure in Fairmount Park; possibly the oldest extant house in Philadelphia
Wall House		Elkins Park	1682	House	Oldest house in Pennsylvania which has had continuous family residency; possibly the oldest stone house in Pennsylvania
Caleb Pusey House		Upland	1683	House	Oldest English-built house in Pennsylvania; only extant building known to have been visited by William Penn
John's Sushi House		Philadelphia, Fox Chase	1683	Restaurant https://johnssushihouse.com/	
Pont Reading		Ardmore	1683	House	
Sellers Hall		Upper Darby	1684	House	Originally home to the Sellers family, including John Sellers, a scientist and founding member of the American Philosophical Society.
Growden Mansion		Bensalem Township	1685	House	
William Smith House		Wrightstown	1686	House	
Mouns Jones House		Douglassville	1686	House	Swedish cabin built by Mans Mouce Jonasson in 1686 in Douglassville in Berks County, Pennsylvania. It's a 2 1/2-story, three bay stone dwelling. It is part of the National Register of Historic Places.
Sign of the Bird in Hand		Newtown	1686	Tavern	Originally a residence, then a tavern with other uses; oldest extant frame house in Pennsylvania; site of the 1778 Newtown Skirmish during which Loyalists killed five and captured 16 to acquire cloth being manufactured for use by Washington's troops at Valley Forge; now a private residence
Phineas Pemberton House		Bristol Township	1687	House	
Wynnestay		Philadelphia, Wynnefield	1689	House	One of the oldest houses in Philadelphia
Farmar Mill		Fort Washington	1690	Mill	Historic mill building; original terminus for Skippack Pike
Thomas Massey House		Broomall	1696, later additions	House	One of the oldest English Quaker houses in the state
Morton Homestead		Prospect Park	c. 1698, later additions	House	Farm founded in 1654
Edward Morgan Log House		Towamencin	1770	House	Home to the maternal grandfather of Daniel Boone
Gloria Dei (Old Swedes' Church)		Philadelphia, Southwark	1700	Religious	Oldest surviving church in Philadelphia
Wolley Stille		Wallingford	1700	House	
Langhorne Hotel		Langhorne	c. 1700	Tavern	Built by William Huddleston; originally known as the Tavern at Attleboro, until the village was renamed for Jeremiah Langhorne in 1876
Brinton 1704 House		West Chester	1704	House	One of the oldest houses in Pennsylvania
Rittenhouse Homestead		Philadelphia, Wissahickon Valley Park	1707	House	Home of William Rittenhouse, the first paper maker in British North America; built by William Rittenhouse and his son Nicholas in 1707; birthplace of David Rittenhouse
Old Trinity Church		Philadelphia, Oxford Circle	1711	Religious	Church of England services first held on this site in 1698 in a log meeting house that had belonged to the Oxford Society of Friends.
Merion Friends Meeting House		Merion Station	c. 1715	Religious	One of the oldest Quaker meeting houses in America
Newtown Square Friends Meeting House		Newtown Township, Delaware County	1711	Religious	Early Welsh Quaker settlers in one of William Penn's two planned "new towns" built this meeting house in 1711.
Thomas Story House		Upper Roxborough, Philadelphia	1717/84	House	The home is described by its current owner as “Dutch Medieval,” owing to the Germanic styling found throughout. The dwelling's walls are built of random Wissahickon schist with ceiling beams of hand-hewn oak. The Dutch-doors on the Ridge Avenue side are also a common feature of Colonial German architecture, a feature that both let in fresh air and sunlight while keeping out stray barnyard animals.
Hans Herr House		Willow Street	1719	House	Oldest house in Lancaster County; oldest surviving structure used as a Mennonite meetinghouse in America
Abraham Rittenhouse House		Historic RittenhouseTown	c. 1720	House	The Abraham Rittenhouse House (c. 1720) with a c. 1860 addition on the left.
Elfreth's Alley		Philadelphia, Old City	1720–1830	Houses	Claimed to be the nation's oldest residential street; two rows of Federal and Georgian brick houses built between 1720 and 1830, with a total of 32 extant houses
Wyck House		Philadelphia, Germantown	c. 1700–20, later additions	House	
Stenton		Philadelphia, Germantown	1723	House	Home of James Logan, secretary of William Penn
Old Chester Courthouse		Chester	1724	Government	The oldest public building in continuous use in the United States; served as a courthouse from 1724 until 1851, and the town hall until the 1960s; now used for miscellaneous city, county and civic functions
Christian Beidler's Grist Mill		Berks County	1729–1738	Mill	Built during the reign of George II of Great Britain, Christian Beidler's grist mill is one of the oldest commercial buildings in the United States, dating from before the start of the Industrial Revolution.
Michael Billmeyer House		Philadelphia, Germantown	1730	House	
The Bake House at RittenhouseTown		Philadelphia, Germantown	c. 1730	Mill	
Quaker Mill House		Goldsboro	1731	House	One of the oldest houses in central Pennsylvania
Bartram's Garden		Philadelphia, Kingsessing	1731	House	The home of John Bartram (1699–1777), America's first botanist and father of William Bartram (1739–1823), himself an eminent botanist and artist
Ephrata Cloister		Ephrata	1732	Religious	Established in 1732 by Johann Conrad Beissel; one of the oldest religious communities in the United States; had the second German printing press in the American colonies which published the largest book by page count in the colonies, Martyrs Mirror
Shelter House		Emmaus	c. 1734–41	House	Longest site of continuous habitation in the Lehigh Valley area
Old Norriton Presbyterian Church		East Norriton Township	1737	Religious	Congregation practicing in vicinity since 1698.
Reading Furnace Home		East Nantmeal Township	1736	House & furnace	Historical house owned by the local Irons works owner and a United States Army officer Samuel Van Leer. The location is listed as a temporary George Washington Headquarter.
Augustus Lutheran Church		Trappe	1743	Religious	Oldest unchanged Lutheran church building in the United States in continuous use by the same congregation
Grumblethorpe		Philadelphia, Germantown	1744	House	
Wister Tenant House		Philadelphia, 5269 Germantown Avenue	c. 1745	House	
Belmont Mansion		Philadelphia, Fairmount Park	1745	House	
The Monastery		Philadelphia, Wissahickon Park	1747	House	
Glen Fern		Philadelphia, 1100 Livezey Lane	1747	House	Glen Fern, also known as the Livezey House, is a fine example of Colonial architecture. This mill that later was one of the largest on the Wissahickon, just below Cresheim Creek, was built by Thomas Shoemaker in 1746 on twenty acres of land purchased from John Harmer on February 5, 1746. The deed mentions buildings and improvements.
Green Tree Tavern		Philadelphia, 6023 Germantown Avenue	1748	House	This attractive house of stone was built by Daniel Pastorius, a grandson of Francis Daniel Pastorius, in 1748. The house contains a date stone with the inscription “DSP 1748,” for Daniel and Sarah Pastorius. Daniel kept a tavern there until his death in 1754.
Cresheim Cottage		Philadelphia, 7402 Germantown Avenue	c. 1748	House	A plaque on the exterior states the cottage was built in 1700 but in all likelihood it was constructed about half a century later.
Shippen-Blair House		Philadelphia, 6043 Germantown Avenue	c. 1750	House	This house was also known as "The Laurens."
Van Leer Cabin		Tredyffrin Township, Pennsylvania	1759	Cabin	Historic cabin and one of the last historical dwellings in Tredyffrin Township, Pennsylvania
Germantown White House		Philadelphia, Germantown	1752	House	Twice served as temporary residence of George Washington during his presidency
Old Germantown Academy and Headmasters' Houses		Philadelphia, Germantown	1760	School	
Mount Pleasant Mansion		Philadelphia, Fairmount Park	1761-62	House	Built by Thomas Nevell. John Adams visited the mansion in 1775 and called it "the most elegant seat in Pennsylvania."
Cliveden		Philadelphia, Germantown	1762	House	Home of Thomas Pettit
Fort Pitt Blockhouse		Pittsburgh	1764	Defense	Oldest structure in Pittsburgh and one of the oldest colonial structures west of the Allegheny Mountains
Harris Cameron Mansion		Harrisburg	1765	House	
Chichester Friends Meetinghouse		Upper Chichester Township	1769	Religious	Quaker meeting house first built in 1688; rebuilt after a fire in 1769.
Summerseat		Morrisville	c. 1770	House	Only house in America owned by two signers of the United States Constitution and Declaration of Independence, Robert Morris and George Clymer; headquarters of George Washington while he plotted the Battle of Trenton
Wyckoff-Mason House		Verona	1774	House	
Concord School House		Philadelphia, Germantown	1775	School	
White Horse Tavern (Douglassville, Pennsylvania)		Douglassville	1780	Tavern	The building operated as a tavern for 90 years until it was converted into a three-family residence in 1870. In 1971, the building was restored and was listed on the National Register of Historic Places in 1975.
Van Leer Pleasant Hill Plantation		West Nantmeal Township, Pennsylvania	c. 1780	House	Historic stone farmhouse located near Glen Moore in West Nantmeal Township, Chester County, Pennsylvania
Tomlinson-Huddleston House		Langhorne	1783	House	
Denison House		Forty Fort	1790	House	Oldest house in Luzerne County
Headhouse at New Market		Philadelphia, Society Hill	1804	Firehouse	Oldest firehouse in the United States
Dickson Tavern		Erie	1815	Commercial	Oldest building in Erie
Academy Hall		Edinboro	1857	School	Oldest normal school building in Pennsylvania; on the Edinboro University campus
Sturgis Pretzel House		Lititz	1861	Commercial	Oldest commercial pretzel bakery in the United States

== See also ==
- List of the oldest buildings in the United States
- National Register of Historic Places listings in Pennsylvania
