= Anthony Sadowski =

- Born: Antoni Sadowski c. 1669; Poland
- Died: April 22, 1736 (aged 67); Amityville, Pennsylvania, U.S.
- Occupations: Trader, interpreter, settler
- Spouse: Marya Bordt (Mary Bird)

Anthony Sadowski (c. 1669 – April 22, 1736) was a Polish-born Indian trader and interpreter employed by the provincial governor of Pennsylvania as an Indian agent in the western country.

== Biography ==
=== Early life ===
Sadowski was born in about 1669 in Poland. He hailed from Ostrowiec Świętokrzyski near the town of Kielce. His father was Marcin Sadowski, who was a chamberlain at the Polish king's castle in Gostyń and, as a deputy of the Polish Sejm, an inspector of the king's land holdings in Ukraine. Though it is not known which schools Antoni attended in his youth, he did receive a classical education.

During the Great Northern War in 1701, Sadowski was taken captive with his brother at Riga. He managed to escape captivity, and made his way to Scotland and England. He sailed to the British colonies, landing in New York City in 1704.

=== In America ===
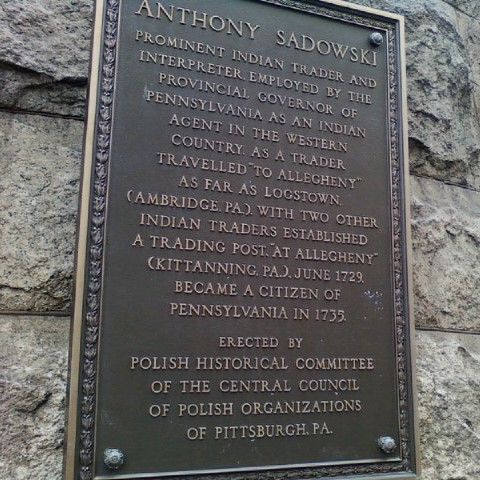
A historical marker commemorating Sadowski on the exterior of the Allegheny County Courthouse in Pittsburgh

After Sadowski moved to the colonial-era Province of New York, he married Marya Bordt (anglicized as Mary Bird), daughter of Andrew Bird of Newtown, New York. They had six children together. Their eldest son Andrew Sadowski and three daughters, Justina, Anna, and Sofia, all married and had children. Two of their grandsons through son Andrew, James and Jacob Sadowski, became noted Kentucky pioneers. Through his daughter Anna, he was also the great-great-great-great-great-grandfather of US President Gerald Ford.

Sadowski moved his family from New Jersey to Pennsylvania in 1712, to a 400-acre (1.6 km^{2}) property along the Schuylkill River. Along with George Boone, grandfather of frontiersman Daniel Boone, he was a founder of Amity Township in Berks County, Pennsylvania, in 1719.

Sadowski worked to establish friendly relations with the Native Americans in the area, learning the Delaware (Lenape) and Iroquois languages. He served as an interpreter to other settlers.

He became an Indian trader, traveling as far as Logstown, a village near present-day Ambridge, Pennsylvania. With two other Indian traders, he established a trading post at Shamokin in 1728 and another at Kittanning, in June 1729. He became a citizen of Pennsylvania in 1735.

=== Death and legacy ===
Sadowski died on April 22, 1736, in Amityville, Pennsylvania, and is buried in the cemetery of Old St. Gabriel's Episcopal Church in Douglassville, Pennsylvania.

His grave marker bears the following inscription:

Whether or not he opened an Indian trading post on the shores of Lake Erie and gave his name to Sandusky, Ohio, here lies the greatest Polish frontiersman of colonial times, an organizer of Amity Township in 1719, and founder of the Sandusky family in America.

French maps as early as 1718 identified Sandusky Bay as Lac Sandouské.
