= Weidner Mill =

- U.S. National Register of Historic Places
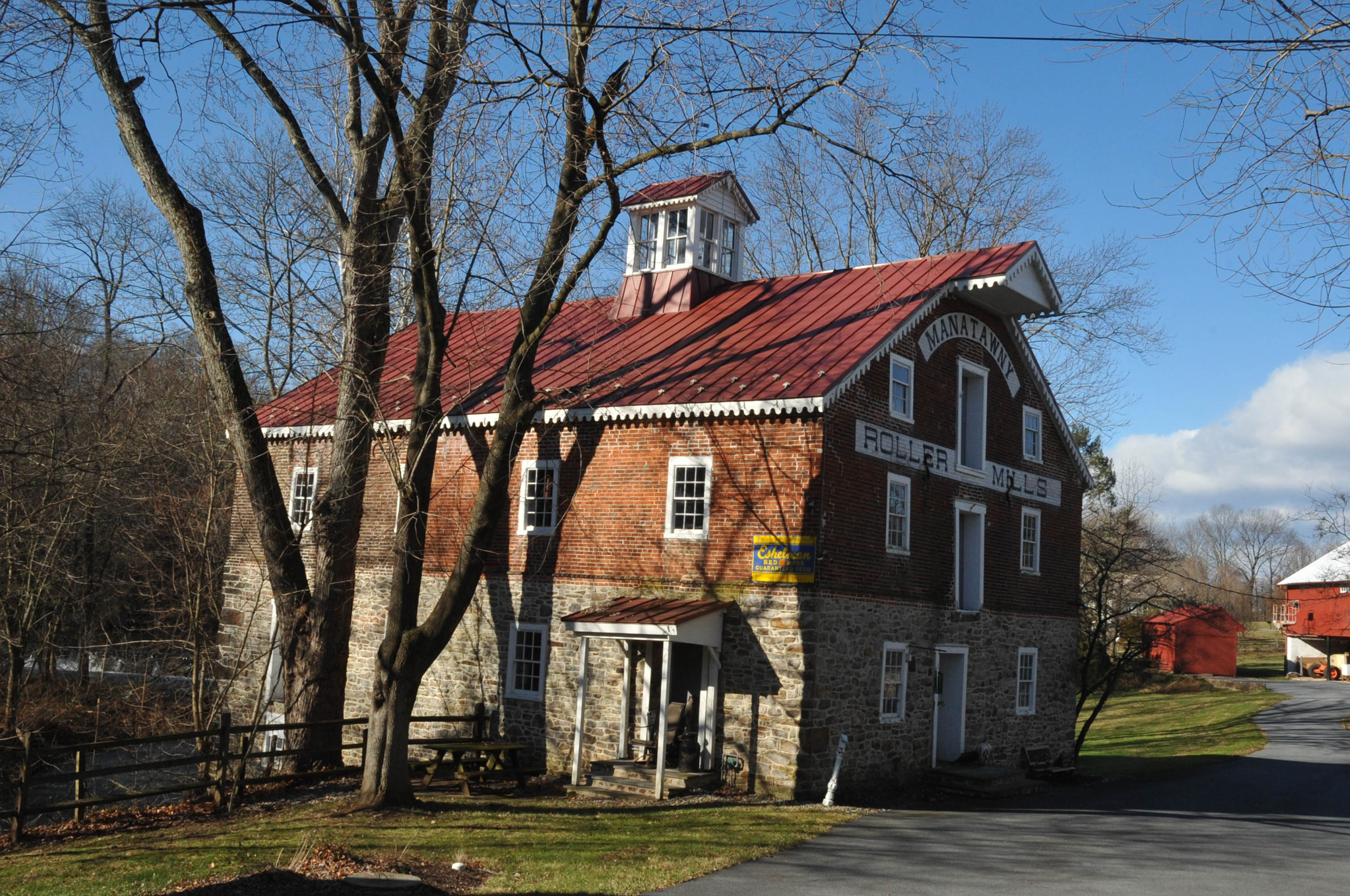

- Location within Pennsylvania Location within the United States
- Location: Blacksmith Road at Manatawny Creek, Amity Township, Pennsylvania
- Coordinates: 40°18′18″N 75°43′37″W
- Area: 6 acres (2.4 ha)
- Built: 1855
- MPS: Gristmills in Berks County MPS
- NRHP reference No.: 90001634
- Added to NRHP: November 8, 1990

Weidner Mill is a historic grist mill complex located on Manatawny Creek in Amity Township, Berks County, Pennsylvania, United States. The complex consists of the 2 1/2-story stone-and-brick banked mill (1855); 2 1/2-story, stucco-over-stone farmhouse (c. 1840); 1 1/2-story, stucco-over-stone, combined smokehouse and spring house (c. 1820); 2 1/2-story, stucco-over-stone tenant house (c. 1820); stucco-over-stone bank barn (c. 1850); and the millrace and dam. The mill ceased operation in the 1940s. The mill was built as part of a working farm.

It was listed on the National Register of Historic Places in 1990.

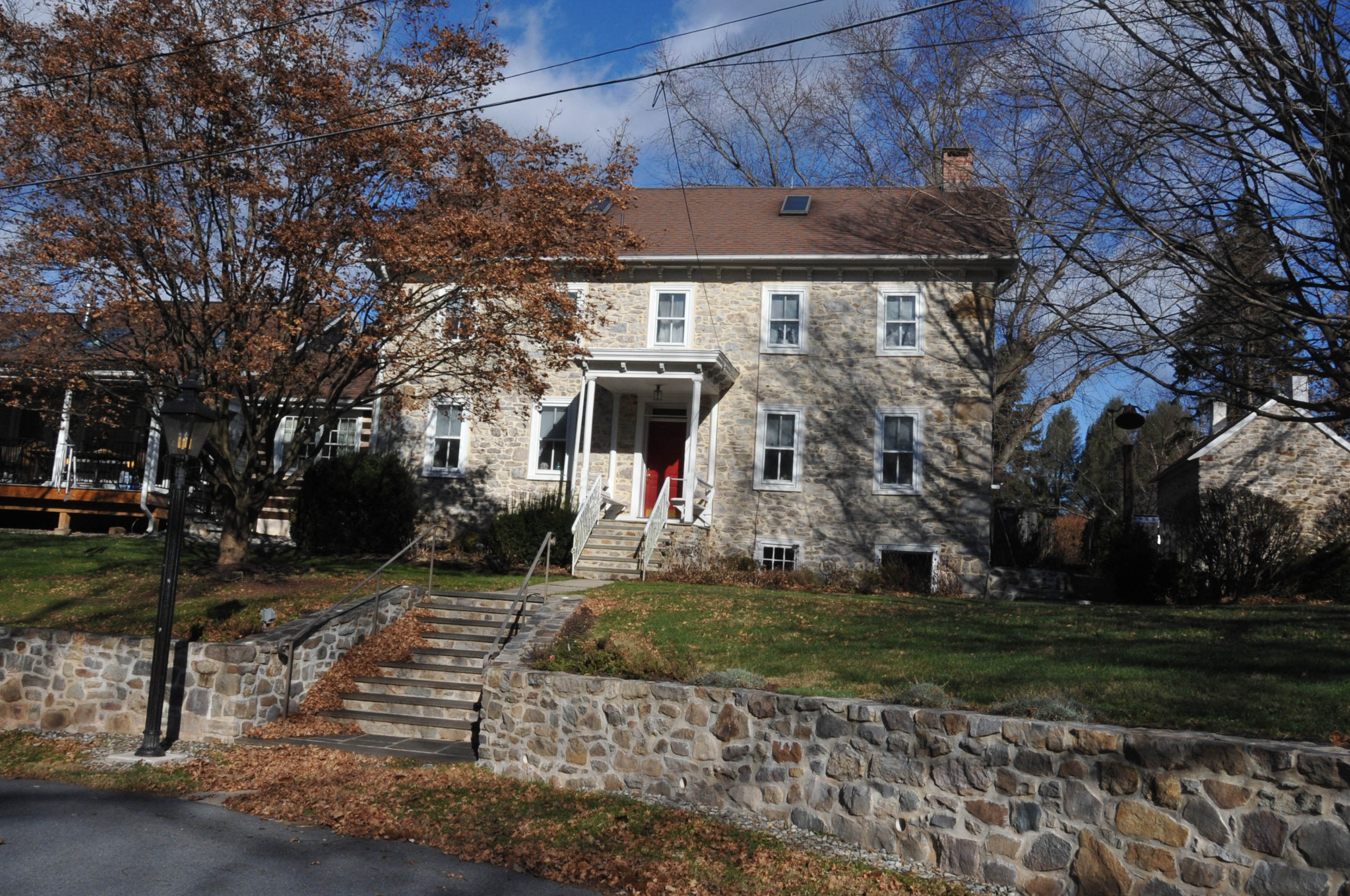
House across from the mill

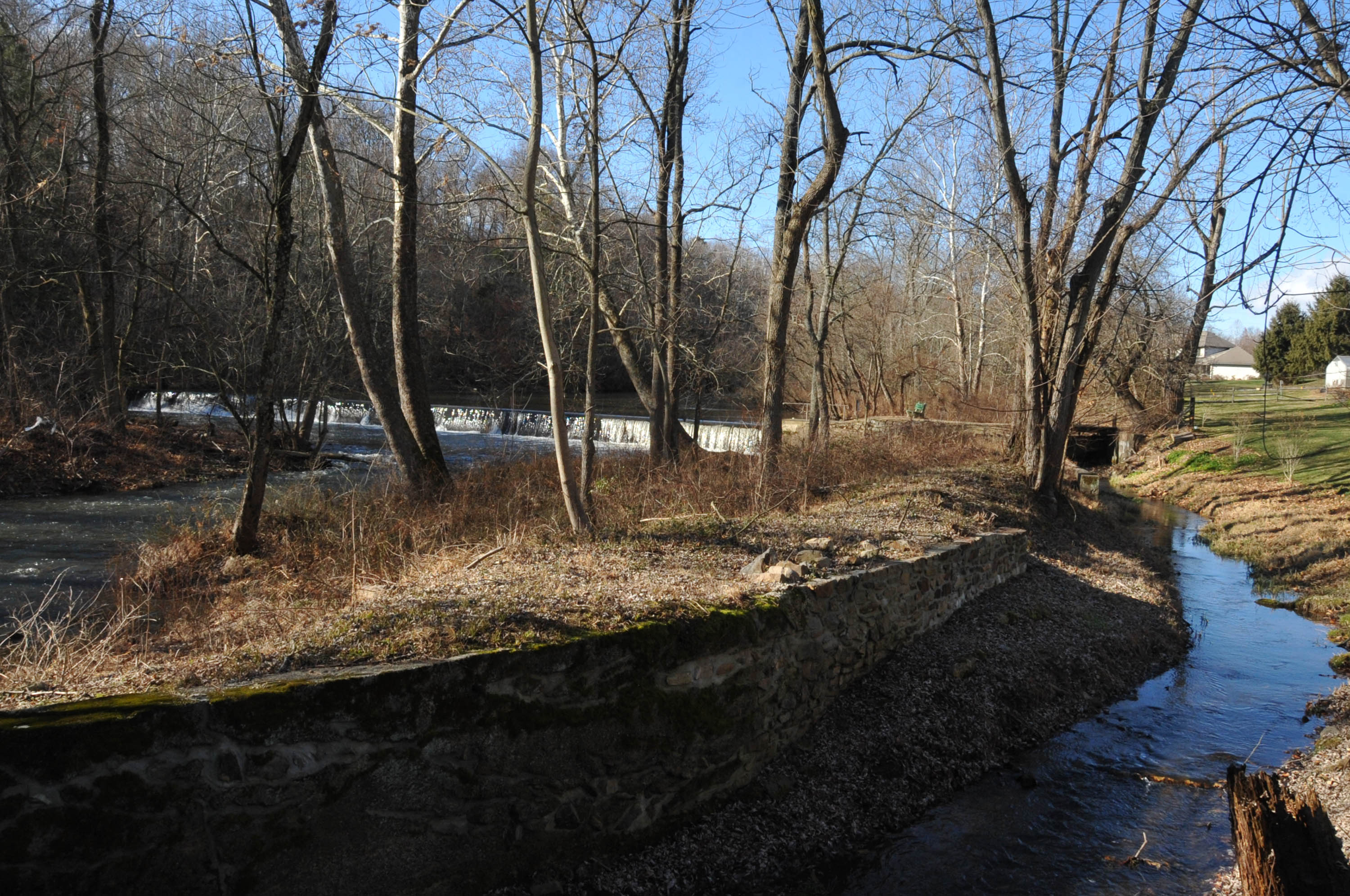
Millrace and dam
