= Boelson Cottage =

Historic house in Pennsylvania, United States

- U.S. National Register of Historic Places
- Philadelphia Register of Historic Places
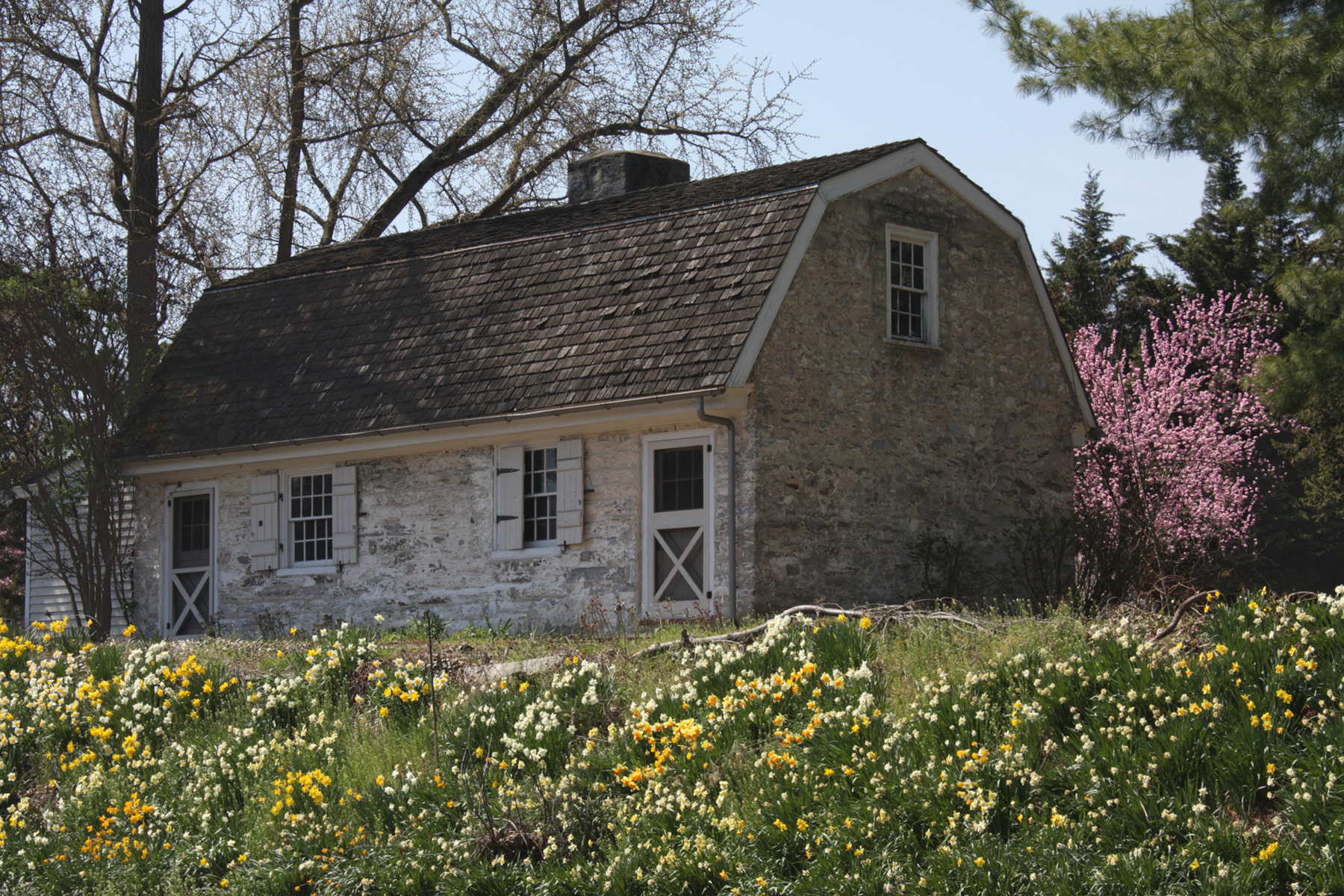

- Location within Philadelphia Location within Pennsylvania Location within the United States
- Location: 2110 Martin Luther King Jr. Drive (fka, West River Drive), Philadelphia 19131
- Coordinates: 39.9896°N 75.2030°W
- Built: 1678–84
- Architectural style: Dutch, Swedish colonial
- NRHP reference No.: 72001151

Significant dates
- Added to NRHP: February 7, 1972
- Designated PRHP: May 28, 1963

Boelson Cottage is a Dutch and Swedish-style colonial era cottage located in Fairmount Park, Philadelphia. The 1 1/2-story gambrel-roofed fieldstone cottage was built sometime between 1678 and 1684. The cottage is situated on the west bank of the Schuylkill River within a plot of 100 acres (40 ha) of land granted to John Boelson in 1677 by the Swedish colonial court in Upland, Pennsylvania. Boelson's cottage is the oldest extant structure in Fairmount Park.

The name of the cottage varied over the years, including Pig's Eye, Tom Moore's, Aunt Cornelia's, and Belmont Cottage—the latter due to its proximity to Belmont Mansion and its possible use as housing for servants of that mansion. The name is also sometimes spelled, or misspelled, Boelsen.

A wooden shed was attached to the south wall of the cottage around 1950. A group called the Friends of the Philadelphia Parks renovated the cottage in 1989–90 and then used it as their office. The original floor, windows, and doors were replaced, as was most of the original woodwork and ironwork.

The cottage is registered on the Philadelphia Register of Historic Places and is an inventoried structure within the Fairmount Park Historic District entry on the National Register of Historic Places.

== See also ==
- List of houses in Fairmount Park
- List of the oldest buildings in Pennsylvania
- National Register of Historic Places listings in West Philadelphia - an inventoried structure within the Fairmount Park listing
