= Rhoads-Lorah House and Barn =

Historic house in Pennsylvania, United States

- U.S. National Register of Historic Places
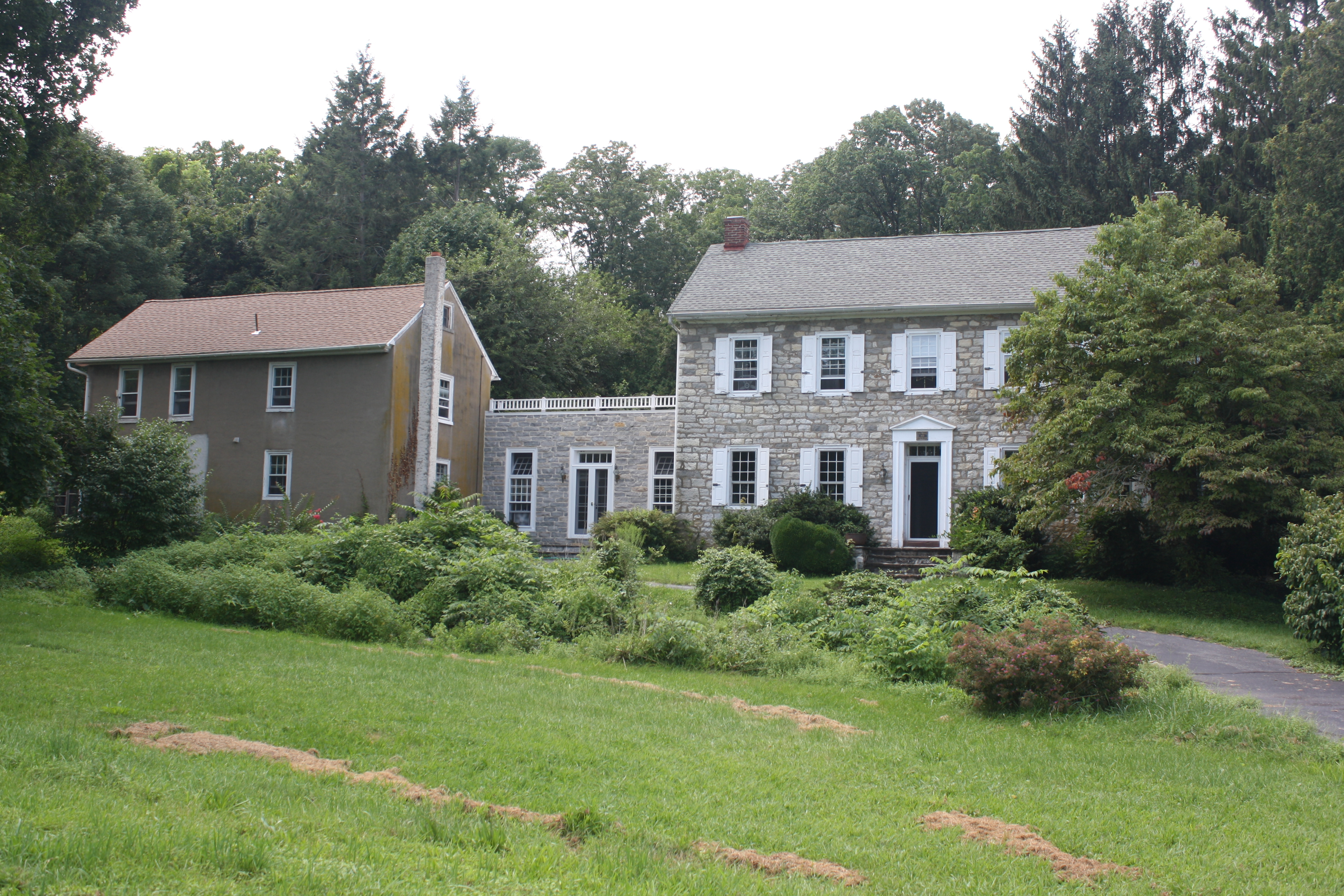
- Rhoads-Lorah House and Barn. August 2013.

- Location within Pennsylvania Location within the United States
- Location: 1832 Old Swede Rd., Amity Township, Pennsylvania
- Coordinates: 40°19′03″N 75°45′14″W
- Area: 6 acres (2.4 ha)
- Built: 1830
- Architectural style: Georgian
- NRHP reference No.: 07000216
- Added to NRHP: March 29, 2007

The Rhoads-Lorah House and Barn, also known as the "Five Springs Farm," is an historic home and barn complex that is located in Amity Township, Berks County, Pennsylvania, United States.

It was listed on the National Register of Historic Places in 2007.

== History and architectural features ==
Built circa 1830, the historic house is a 2 1/2-story, five-bay, limestone dwelling that was designed in the Georgian style and measures forty-two feet by twenty feet. It is attached to an earlier two-story, seventeen-foot by seventeen-foot, stone dwelling, making a "T"-shape. The stone barn was also built circa 1830, and measures sixty-six feet by forty-one feet. Also located on the property are a contributing springhouse, a drive-through corn crib, and a machinery shed.
