= Griesemer-Brown Mill Complex =

- U.S. National Register of Historic Places
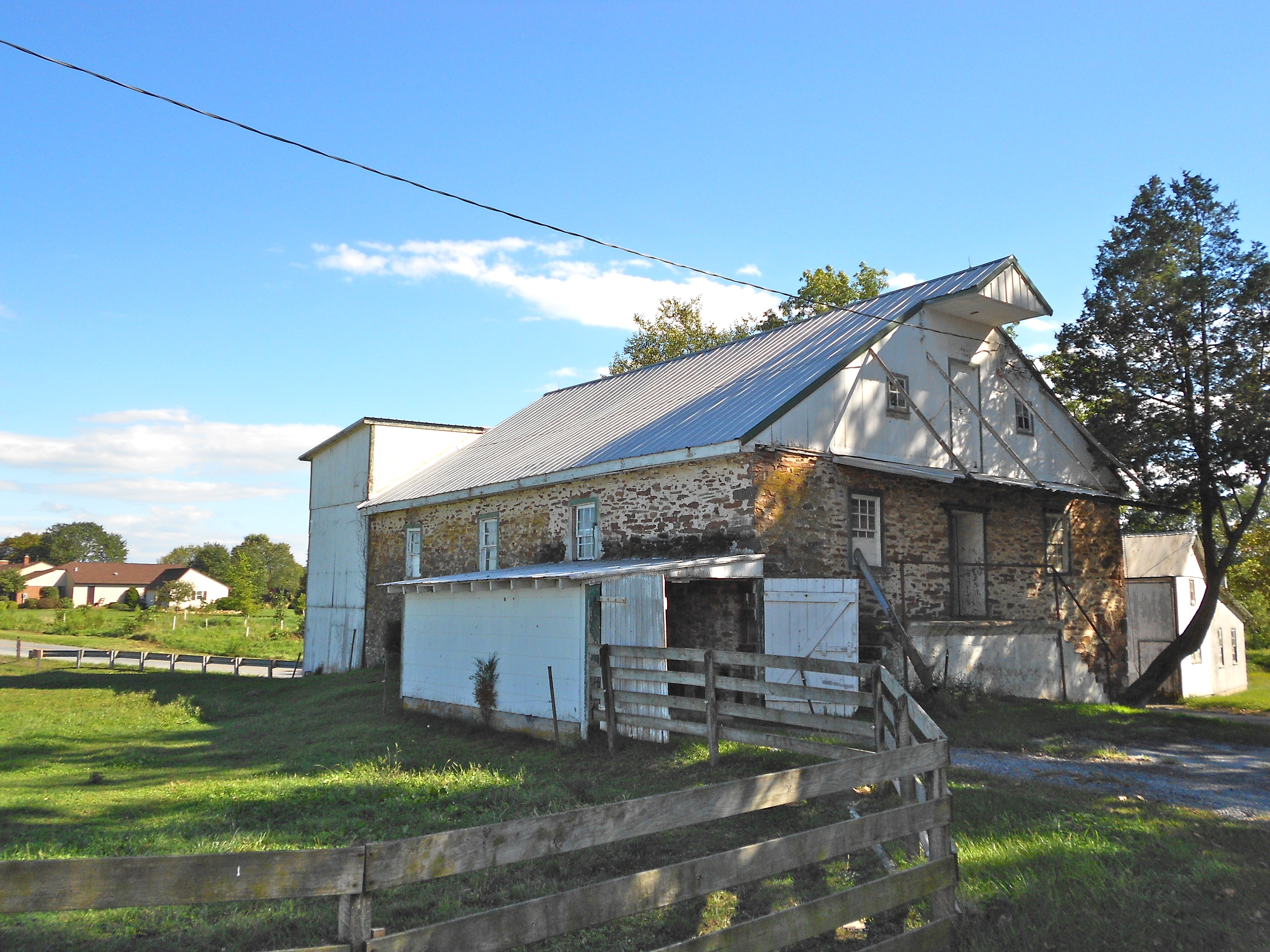
- Mill

- Location within Pennsylvania Location within the United States
- Location: Brown's Mill Road at Monocacy Creek, Amity Township, Pennsylvania
- Coordinates: 40°18′08″N 75°46′57″W
- Area: 4 acres (1.6 ha)
- Built: 1843
- MPS: Gristmills in Berks County MPS
- NRHP reference No.: 90001616
- Added to NRHP: November 8, 1990

The Griesemer-Brown Mill Complex is an historic grist mill complex which is located on Monocacy Creek in Amity Township, Berks County, Pennsylvania.

It was listed on the National Register of Historic Places in 1990.

== Description ==
The complex consists of the one-and-one-half-story, stuccoed, sandstone mill, which was erected in 1843, a two-and-one-half-story, stucco over stone farmhouse that was built sometime around 1830, a one-and-one-half-story, stucco over stone, brick and frame summer kitchen that was erected sometime around 1830, a stone and frame barn that was built circa 1850, two small barns that were built circa 1900, a wagon shed and corn crib that were erected sometime around 1920, and a frame garage that was built sometime around 1920.

The mill is representative of a country custom mill and was built as part of a working farm.

== History ==
The Gristmill was built by Abraham Griesemer in 1843. It was sold to George Brown in 1871 by Samuel Griesemer, Abraham's son. George Brown operated the mill until 1889 when he retired; his son Frank M. Brown then assumed operation of the mill. One year later, Frank installed a roller mill, which increased Flour output to one barrel per hour.

== Notable people ==
- Mike Mowrey, was an American professional baseball third baseman who played in the Major Leagues for Cardinals and Brooklyn Dodgers.
