= Joshua Humphreys =

American shipwright

The building of the Frigate Philadelphia, Plate 29 of Birch's Views of Philadelphia (1800). The man standing in the foreground may be a portrait of Humphreys.

Joshua Humphreys (June 17, 1751 – January 12, 1838) was an American shipwright. He was the constructor of the original six frigates of the United States Navy and is known as the "Father of the American Navy". Humphreys was born in Ardmore, Haverford Township, Pennsylvania, where he lived his entire life. He was the son of Joshua Humphreys (for whom he was named) and Sarah Williams, grandson of Daniel Humphreys and Hannah Wynne (daughter of Dr. Thomas Wynne). He was a nephew of Charles Humphreys, a leading Pennsylvania Patriot. His home, Pont Reading, is still a private residence.

== Career ==
As a youth, Humphreys was apprenticed to a shipbuilder in Philadelphia, Pennsylvania; most of the major shipbuilders in Philadelphia were, like Humphreys, followers of the Quaker faith. At some point during his apprenticeship, Humphreys was transferred to a different master, who died unexpectedly in 1774. Despite his youth and unfinished training, Humphreys inherited ownership of his master's yard. During the American Revolutionary War he was active as a builder and outfitter of privateering vessels and played a major part in planning the 32-gun frigate USS Randolph before the British capture of Philadelphia halted that effort.

In postwar Philadelphia, Humphreys gained a reputation as the city's best shipbuilder and quickly became a wealthy man. His main shipyard complex was on the Delaware River in the Southwark neighborhood.

When Congress passed the Naval Act of 1794 providing for the construction of six frigates, it called on him to design them. He was appointed "Master Naval Constructor" on June 28, 1794, and began work on these ships, the beginnings of the U.S. Navy.

Reputedly, one of the inspirations for his frigate designs was the South Carolina, planned by an innovative French shipwright. His designs called for ships that were longer and wider than usual, sat lower in the water and were able to equal the speed of any other fighting ships. The ships Humphrey built were more stable than other ships at the time and could carry as many guns on one deck as others did on two decks.

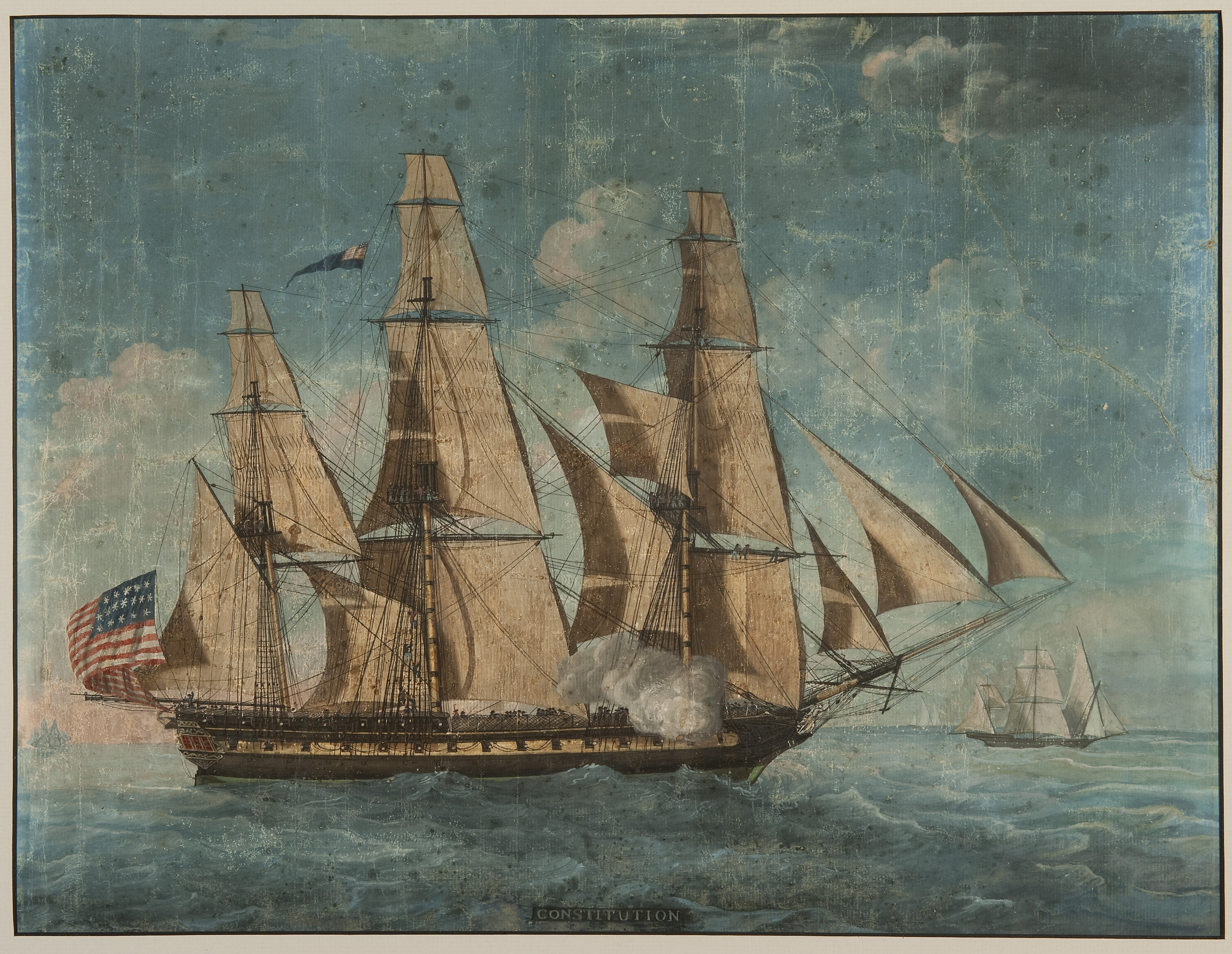
USS Constitution c. 1803–04

The USS United States was built under Humphreys' direction in Philadelphia, and was the first of the new ships to be launched on May 10, 1797. These vessels were larger than other ships of their class and formed the core of the American navy during the War of 1812, where they fought several victorious actions against the Royal Navy, although two were captured by the British. His six frigates were:

- USS United States (1797)
- USS Constellation (1797)
- USS Constitution (1797)
- USS Chesapeake (1799)
- USS Congress (1799)
- USS President (1800)

In 1789, Humphreys was elected to the American Philosophical Society.

== Family ==
His uncle was Charles Humphreys, a member of the Continental Congress. His son was another noted naval architect, Samuel Humphreys. His grandson, General Andrew Atkinson Humphreys, served throughout the American Civil War.

== Legacy ==
Two ships, USS Humphreys (DD-236) and USNS Joshua Humphreys (T-AO-188), were named for Humphreys.

Building 197 of the Washington Navy Yard was completely renovated in 2014 and renamed in honor of Humphreys. The building was the site of the Washington Navy Yard shooting on September 16, 2013.
