= Amity Township, Berks County, Pennsylvania =

Township in Pennsylvania, US

Amity Township
- Township
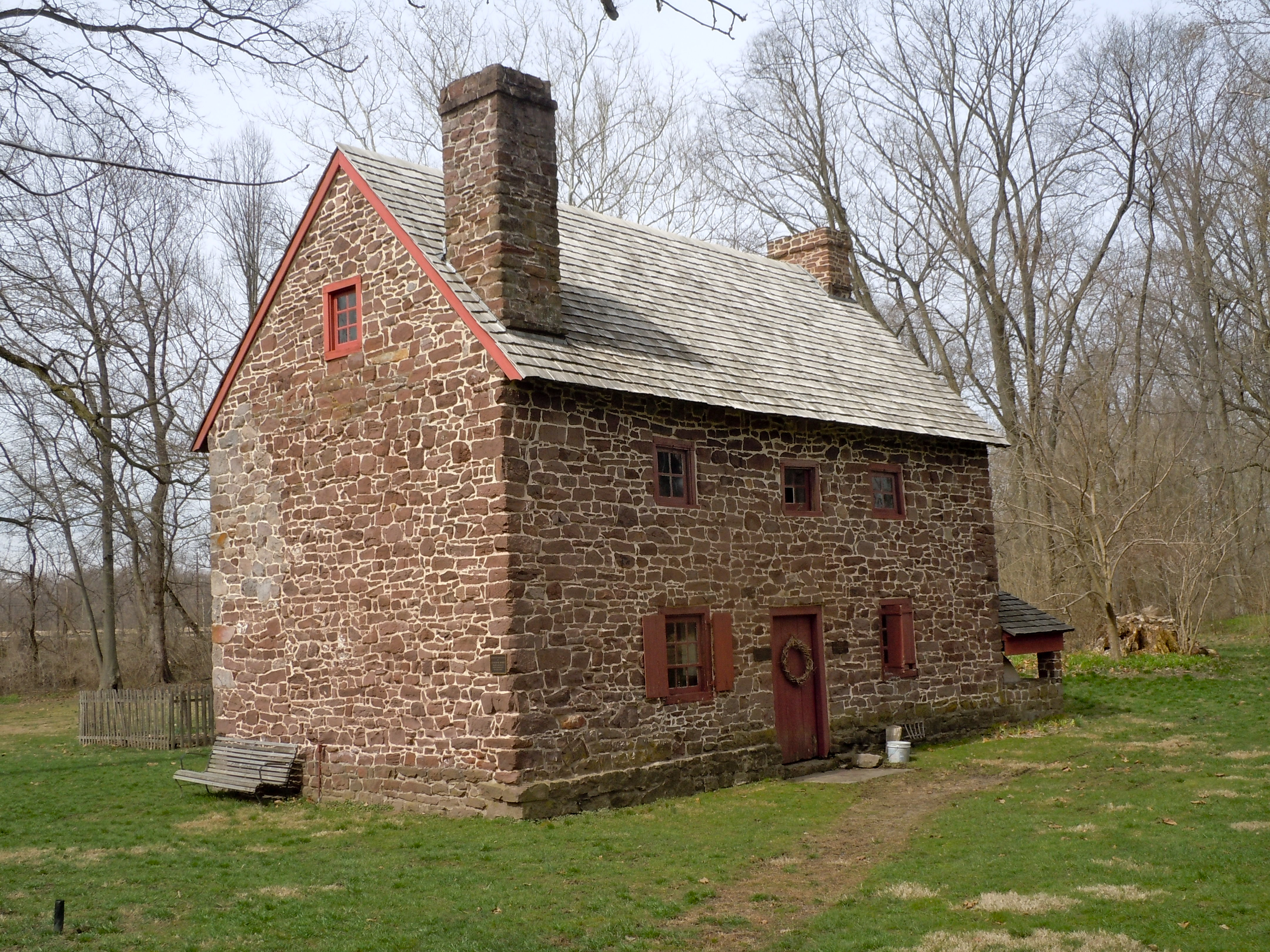
- Mouns Jones House in March 2011

- Seal

- Location of Amity Township in Pennsylvania Amity Township (the United States)
- Coordinates: 40°17′30″N 75°45′29″W
- Country: United States
- State: Pennsylvania
- County: Berks

Area
  - Total: 18.39 sq mi (47.63 km^{2})
  - Land: 18.08 sq mi (46.82 km^{2})
  - Water: 0.31 sq mi (0.81 km^{2})
- Elevation: 223 ft (68 m)

Population (2020)
  - Total: 13,435 ▲
  - Estimate (2021): 13,421
  - Density: 712.1/sq mi (274.94/km^{2})
- Time zone: UTC-5 (EST)
  - Summer (DST): UTC-4 (EDT)
- Area code: 610
- FIPS code: 42-011-02328
- Website: amitytownshippa.com

Amity Township is a township in Berks County, Pennsylvania, United States. The population was 13,435 at the 2020 census. Amity Township, especially in the Douglassville area, is seeing growth in development as a bedroom community for Philadelphia and Reading.

The township was so named for the cordial relationship, or amity, between Swedish settlers and the local Native Americans.

== History ==
The George Douglass House, Griesemer-Brown Mill Complex, Old St. Gabriel's Episcopal Church, Mouns Jones House, Rhoads-Lorah House and Barn, Weidner Mill, and White Horse Tavern are listed on the National Register of Historic Places.

== Geography ==
According to the U.S. Census Bureau, the township has a total area of 18.4 square miles (48 km^{2}), of which 18.3 square miles (47 km^{2}) is land and 0.1 square miles (0.26 km^{2}) (0.60%) is water. It has a hot-summer humid continental climate (Dfa) and is located mostly in hardiness zone 6b, with that being 7a near the river, including Douglassville.

Adjacent townships

- Exeter Township (west)
- Oley Township (northwest)
- Earl Township (north)
- Douglass Township (east)
- Union Township (south)

The census-designated places of Amity Gardens and Douglassville are both located in Amity Township, along the Schuylkill River.

== Demographics ==
At the 2000 census, there were 8,867 people, 3,219 households, and 2,510 families in the township. The population density was 484.5 inhabitants per square mile (187.1/km^{2}). There were 3,323 housing units at an average density of 181.6 per square mile (70.1/km^{2}). The racial makeup of the township was 95.68% White, 2.04% African American, 0.19% Native American, 0.67% Asian, 0.01% Pacific Islander, 0.38% from other races, and 1.03% from two or more races. Hispanic or Latino of any race were 1.00%.

Historical population
Census	Pop.	Note	%±
1980	5,883		—
1990	6,434		9.4%
2000	8,867		37.8%
2010	12,583		41.9%
2020	13,435		6.8%
2021 (est.)	13,421		−0.1%
Source: US Census Bureau

There were 3,219 households, 37.7% had children under the age of 18 living with them, 68.0% were married couples living together, 6.7% had a female householder with no husband present, and 22.0% were non-families. 17.1% of households were made up of individuals, and 6.3% were one person aged 65 or older. The average household size was 2.75 and the average family size was 3.12.

The age distribution was 27.7% under the age of 18, 5.6% from 18 to 24, 32.8% from 25 to 44, 24.1% from 45 to 64, and 9.8% 65 or older. The median age was 36 years. For every 100 females there were 97.6 males. For every 100 females age 18 and over, there were 95.3 males.

The median household income was $59,595 and the median family income was $67,069. Males had a median income of $47,002 versus $31,389 for females. The per capita income for the township was $24,652. About 2.5% of families and 4.8% of the population were below the poverty line, including 3.8% of those under age 18 and 9.8% of those age 65 or over.

== Transportation ==
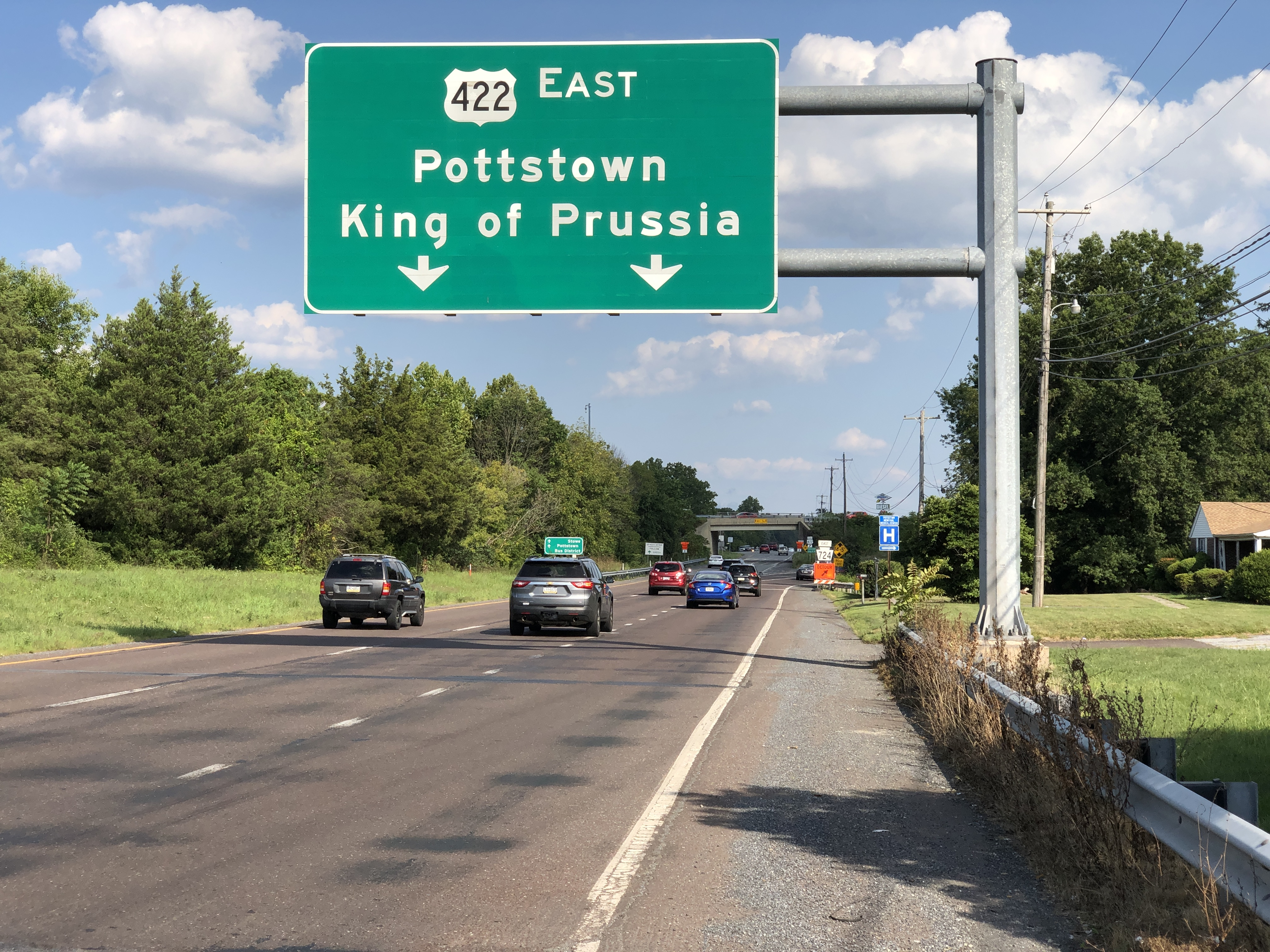
US 422 eastbound in Amity Township

As of 2020, there were 92.71 miles (149.20 km) of public roads in Amity Township, of which 27.80 miles (44.74 km) were maintained by the Pennsylvania Department of Transportation (PennDOT) and 64.91 miles (104.46 km) were maintained by the township.

U.S. Route 422 is the most prominent highway serving Amity Township. It follows the Benjamin Franklin Highway and Pottstown Expressway along a northwest–southeast alignment across the southern portion of the township. Pennsylvania Route 562 follows Boyertown Pike along an east–west alignment along the northern edge of the township. Pennsylvania Route 662 follows Old Swede Road along a north–south alignment across the northern and eastern portions of the township.

== Notable person ==
- Anthony Sadowski, emigre who became an interpreter, trader and agent with local natives
