= George Douglass House =

Historic house in Pennsylvania, United States

- U.S. National Register of Historic Places
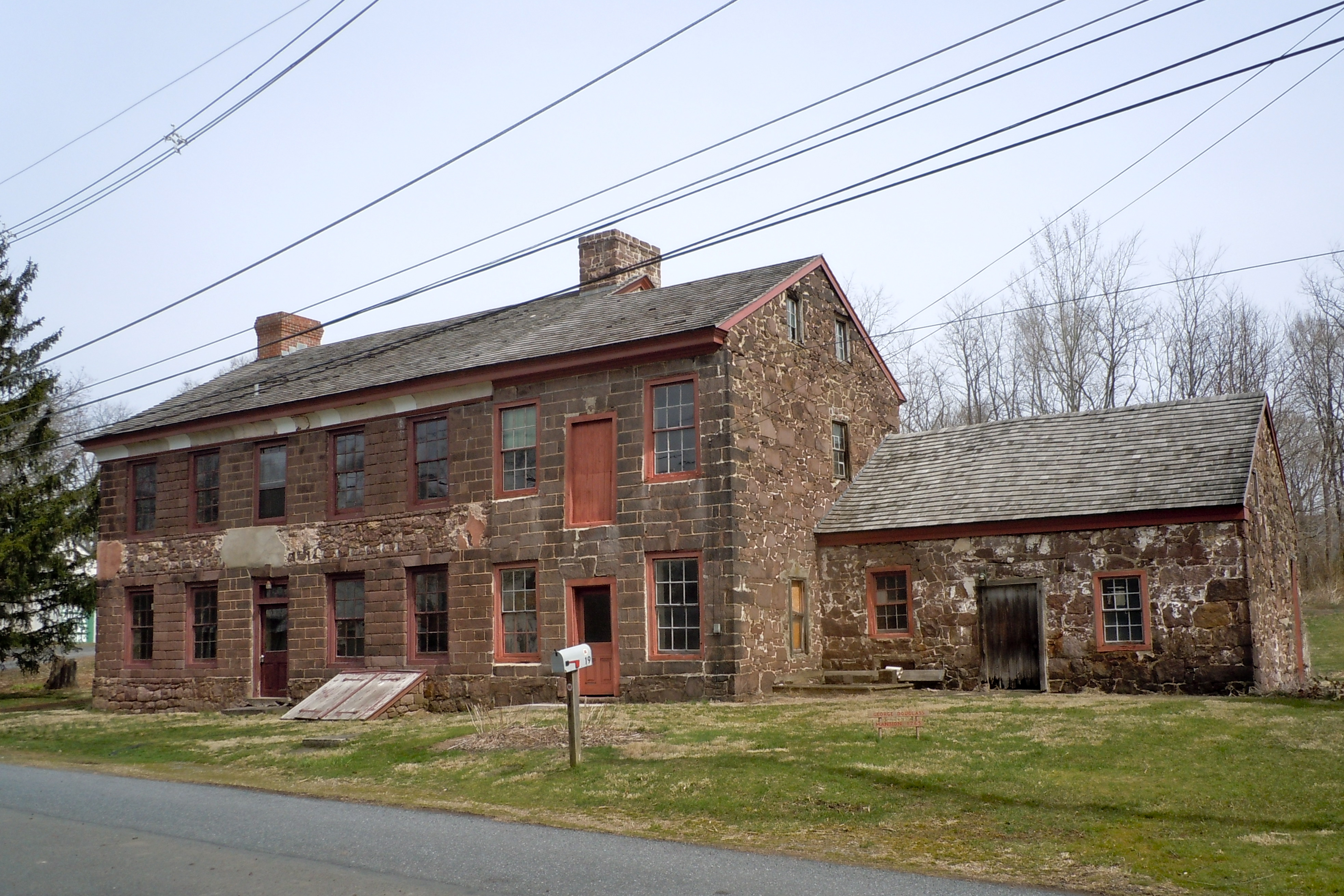
- Douglass Mansion, March 2011

- Location within Pennsylvania Location within the United States
- Location: 19 Old Philadelphia Pike, Amity Township, Pennsylvania
- Coordinates: 40°15′23″N 75°43′34″W
- Area: 1.1 acres (0.45 ha)
- Built: 1763, c. 1800, c. 1833, c. 1900
- Architectural style: Georgian
- NRHP reference No.: 09000462
- Added to NRHP: June 25, 2009

The George Douglass House is an historic home and store building which is located in Amity Township, Berks County, Pennsylvania.

It was listed on the National Register of Historic Places in 2009.

== History and architectural features ==
Built in 1763, the George Douglass House is a two-story, sandstone building with a gable roof. Its main section has a Georgian plan.

Attached to the main section is a two-story store wing that was built circa 1800, a one-story smokehouse, a wash house addition that was erected sometime around 1833, a full-width rear porch that was added around that same year, and a one-story kitchen wing that was added circa 1900.

Restoration of the house by the Historic Preservation Trust of Berks County took place between 1995 and 2002.
