= USNS Joshua Humphreys =

Oiler of the United States Navy

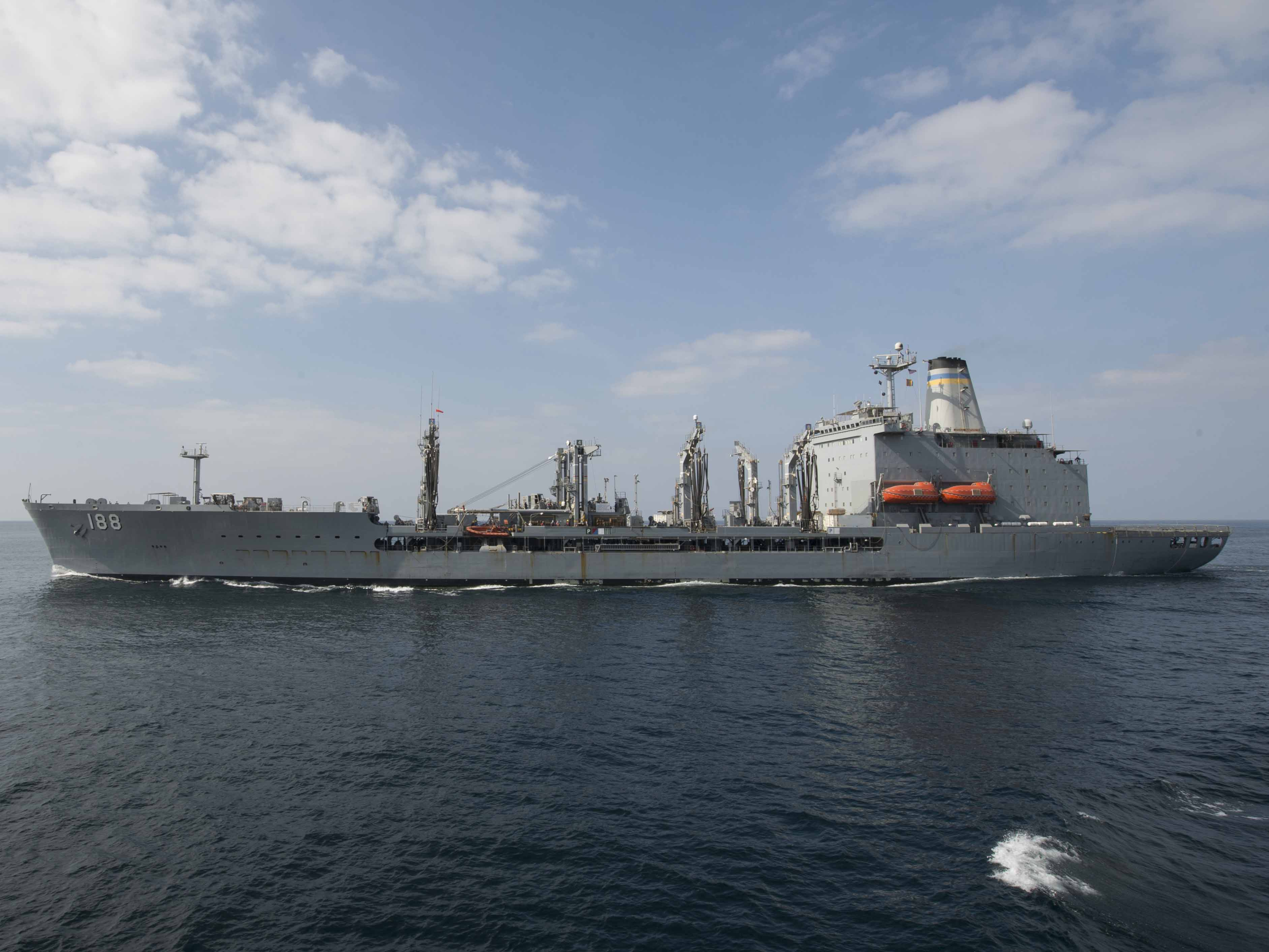
- USNS Joshua Humphreys (T-AO-188) in 2015

History

United States
- Name: Joshua Humphreys
- Namesake: Joshua Humphreys (1751-1838), American shipbuilder
- Awarded: 20 January 1983
- Builder: Avondale Shipyard
- Laid down: 17 December 1984
- Launched: 22 February 1986
- In service: 3 April 1987 – 29 June 1996 and 23 February 2005 – 1 October 2006
- Out of service: 29 June 1996 – 23 February 2005 and 1 October 2006
- Identification: IMO number: 8302428; MMSI number: 367862000; Callsign: NNJH
- Status: in active service

General characteristics
- Class & type: Henry J. Kaiser-class replenishment oiler
- Type: Fleet replenishment oiler
- Tonnage: 31,200 deadweight tons
- Displacement: 9,500 tons light; Full load variously reported as 42,382 tons and 40,700 long tons (41,353 metric tons)
- Length: 677 ft (206 m)
- Beam: 97 ft 5 in (29.69 m)
- Draft: 35 ft (11 m) maximum
- Installed power: 16,000 hp (11.9 MW) per shaft; 34,442 hp (25.7 MW) total sustained
- Propulsion: Two medium-speed Colt-Pielstick PC4-2/2 10V-570 diesel engines, two shafts, controllable-pitch propellers
- Speed: 20 knots (37 km/h; 23 mph)
- Capacity: 178,000 to 180,000 barrels (28,300 to 28,600 m^{3}) of fuel oil and jet fuel; 7,400 sq ft (690 m^{2}) dry cargo space; eight 20-foot (6.1 m) refrigerated containers with room for 128 pallets
- Complement: 103 (18 civilian officers, 1 U.S. Navy officer, 64 merchant seamen, 20 U.S. Navy enlisted personnel)
- Armament: Peacetime: none; Wartime: probably 2 x 20 mm Phalanx CIWS
- Aircraft carried: None
- Aviation facilities: Helicopter landing platform
- Notes: Five refueling stations; Two dry cargo transfer rigs

USNS Joshua Humphreys (T-AO-188) is a Henry J. Kaiser-class replenishment oiler of the United States Navy. She was named for Joshua Humphreys, who designed the six original US Navy frigates. She entered service in 1987 and was placed in reserve just nine years later, but has twice been brought out of reserve and as of 2015 is once more on active duty.

== Construction and delivery ==
Joshua Humphreys, the second ship of the Henry J. Kaiser class, was specially built for the Military Sealift Command (MSC). She was laid down at Avondale Shipyard, Inc., at New Orleans, Louisiana, on 17 December 1984 and launched on 22 February 1986. She entered non-commissioned US Navy service with a primarily civilian crew on 3 April 1987.

== Service history ==
=== 1980s-1990s ===
Joshua Humphreys served in the United States Atlantic Fleet under MSC control until taken out of active service on 29 June 1996, the second ship of her class to be deactivated. She was subsequently berthed at the Naval Inactive Ship Maintenance Facility (NISMF) at the site of the former Philadelphia Navy Yard in Philadelphia, Pennsylvania, and placed in reserve.

=== 2000s ===
Joshua Humphreys was reactivated on 23 February 2005. She was deactivated again on 1 October 2006, and again placed in reserve at the Philadelphia facility, where she was moored in the Delaware River.

=== 2010s ===
In March 2010 Atlantic Marine in Philadelphia was awarded a $12.8 million contract for the reactivation of the Joshua Humphreys. Upon reactivation, she joined the US Fifth Fleet in support of counter-piracy and counter-terrorism operations in the Indian Ocean and Gulf area. As 11 November 2010 she was providing fuel to the Abraham Lincoln Carrier Strike Group.

== Gallery ==
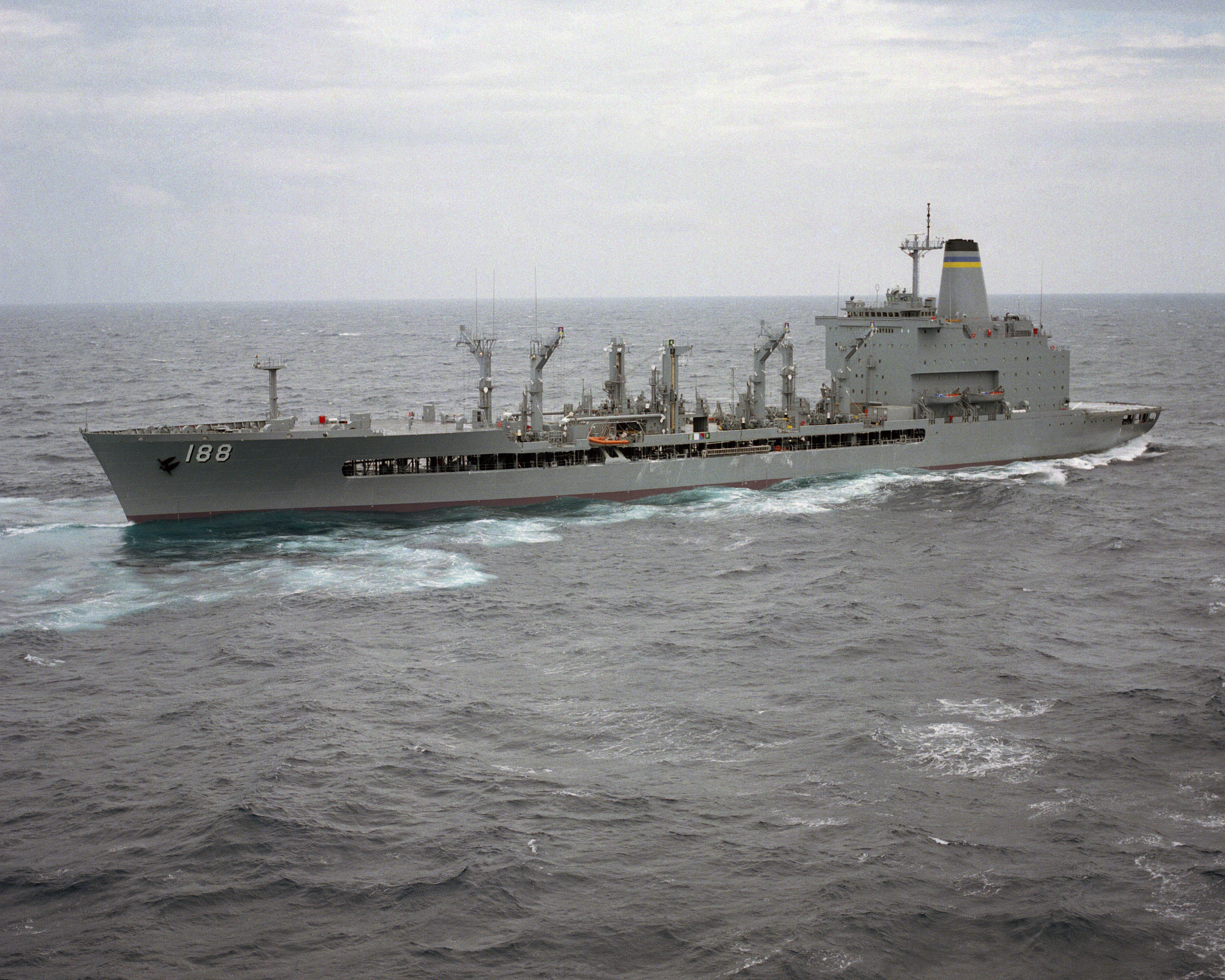
Joshua Humphreys underway in reverse during sea trials, February 1987

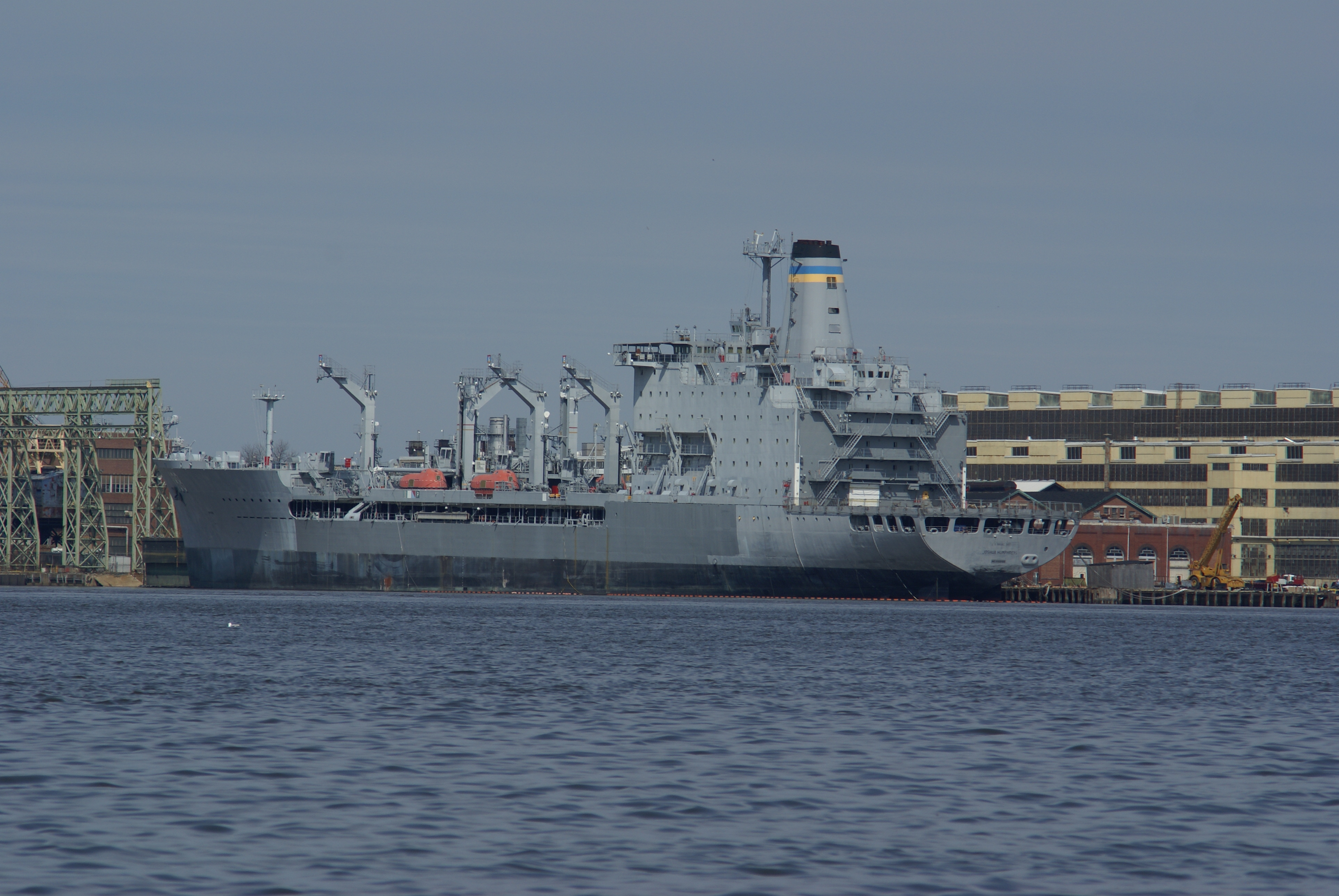
Joshua Humphreys at NISMF - Philadelphia in 2008

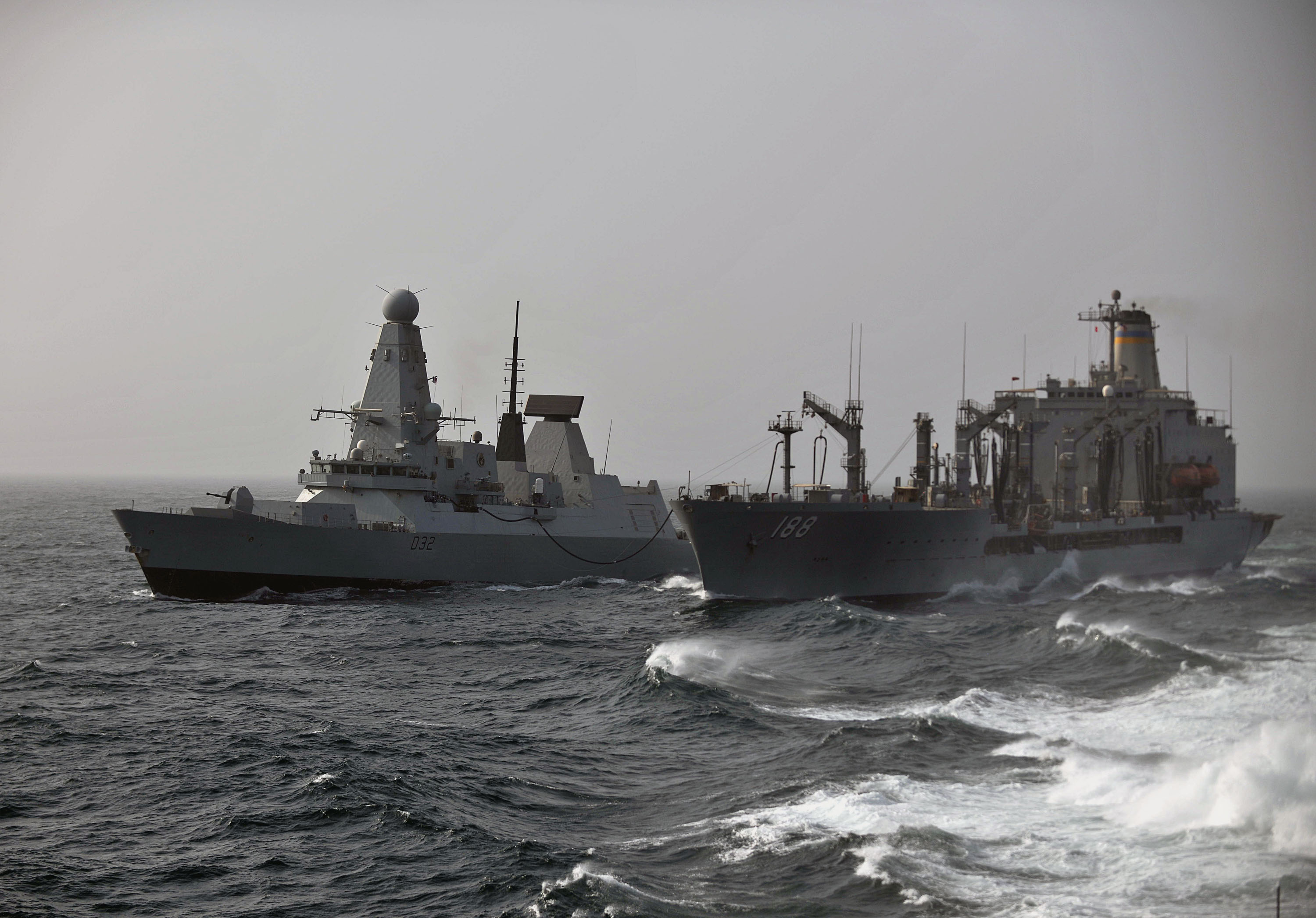
Joshua Humphreys replenishes Royal Navy destroyer HMS Daring in 2012

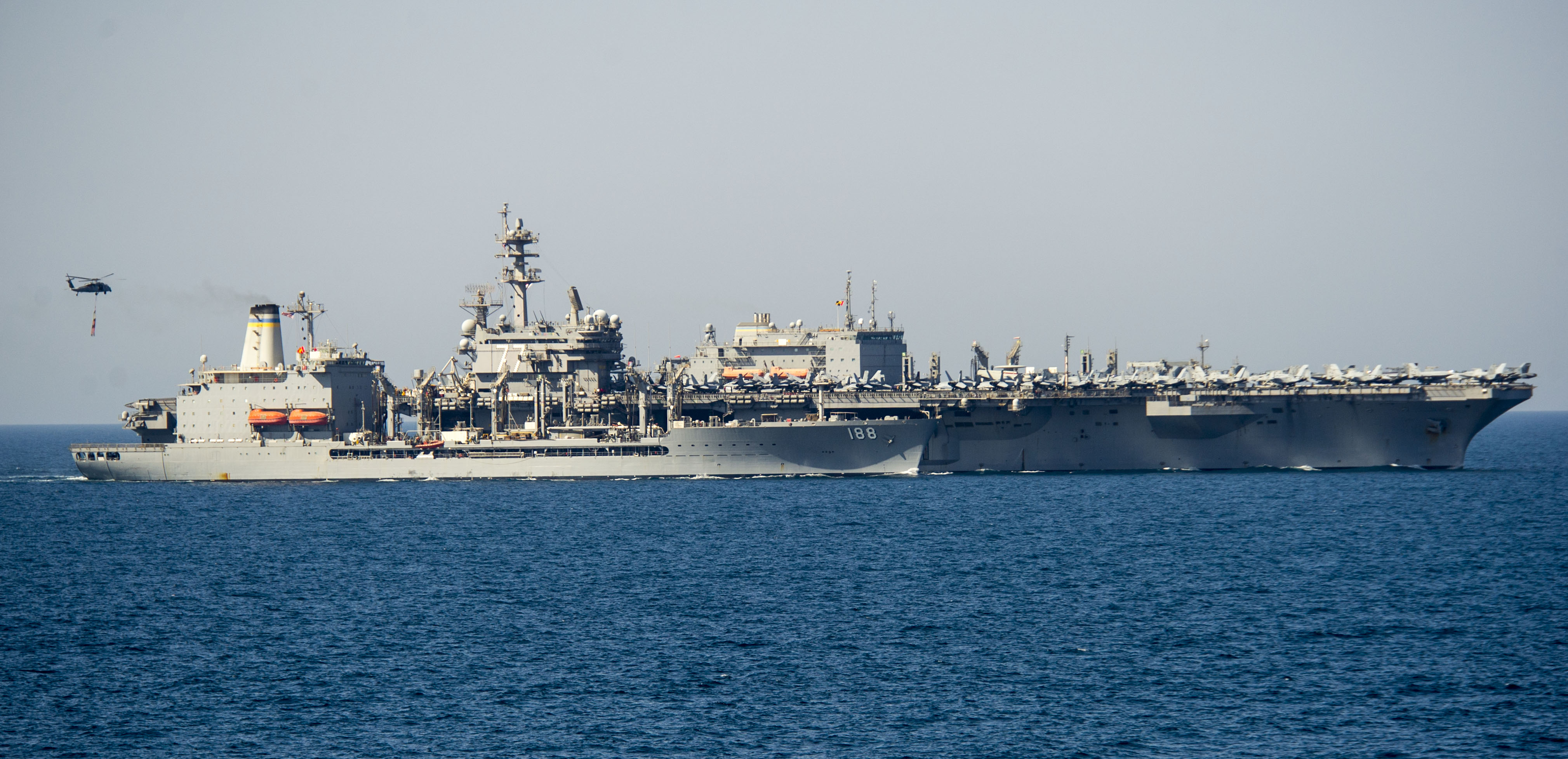
Joshua Humphreys steams alongside the carrier, George Bush, 9 July 2014
