= Lower Swedish Cabin =

Historic house in Pennsylvania, United States

- U.S. National Register of Historic Places
- Pennsylvania state historical marker
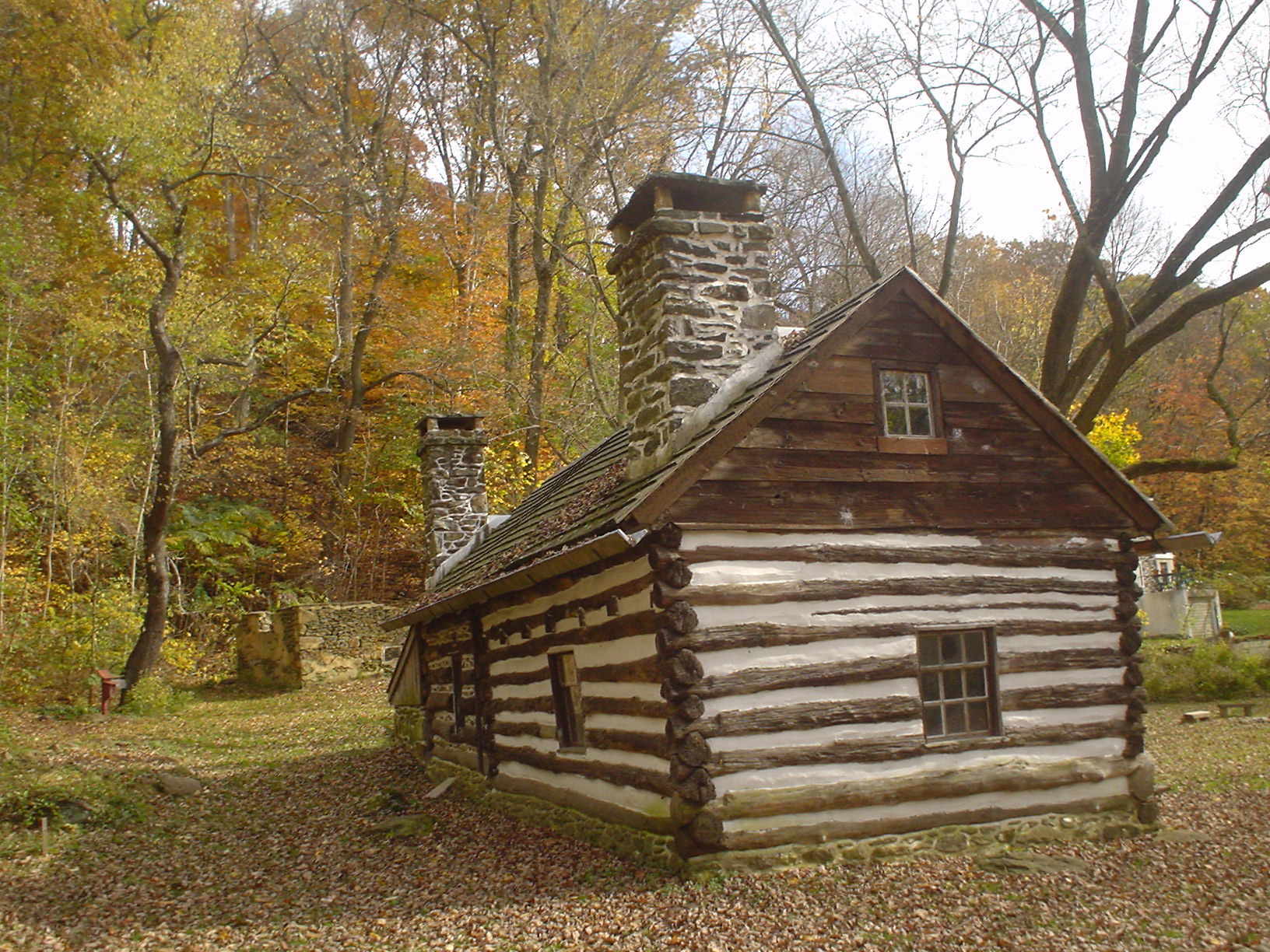
- Lower Swedish Cabin, November 2009

- Location within Pennsylvania Location within the United States
- Location: Drexel Hill, Upper Darby Township, Pennsylvania
- Coordinates: 39°56′17.78″N 75°18′04.75″W
- Area: 1.7 acres (0.69 ha)
- Built: 1640–1650
- Architectural style: Swedish Plan
- NRHP reference No.: 80003484

Significant dates
- Added to NRHP: June 9, 1980
- Designated PHMC: October 21, 1989

The Lower Swedish Cabin is a historic Swedish-style log cabin which is located on Creek Road in the Drexel Hill section of Upper Darby, Pennsylvania, along Darby Creek. The cabin may be one of the oldest log cabins in the United States and is one of the last cabins built by the Swedish settlers that remains intact.

== History ==
The house was likely built sometime between 1640 and 1650 by Swedish immigrants who were part of the New Sweden colony. During the early 1900s, film pioneer Siegmund Lubin filmed several movies at the site. Despite this being disputed, several local residents have evidence of being used as extras. The filming became such a distraction to the workers of the nearby mill, that the owner filed for an injunction to prevent Lubin filming during work hours.

The house served as a private residence until 1937, when it was recorded by the Historic American Buildings Survey. In 1941, the cabin became the property of the township of Upper Darby.

Afterwards, it was offered to local Girl Scouts who used it as a campsite for several years. Then, a series of Township-appointed tenants lived there until 1964. A partial attempt to fix-up the house was done for the Bicentennial in 1976. The building was added to the National Register of Historic Places in 1982.

A full historical restoration and archeological excavation were completed in 1989. The site is now cared for by the Friends of the Swedish Cabin.

It may be visited from April through October, on Sundays from 1 - 4 pm. Admission is free. Donations are accepted.

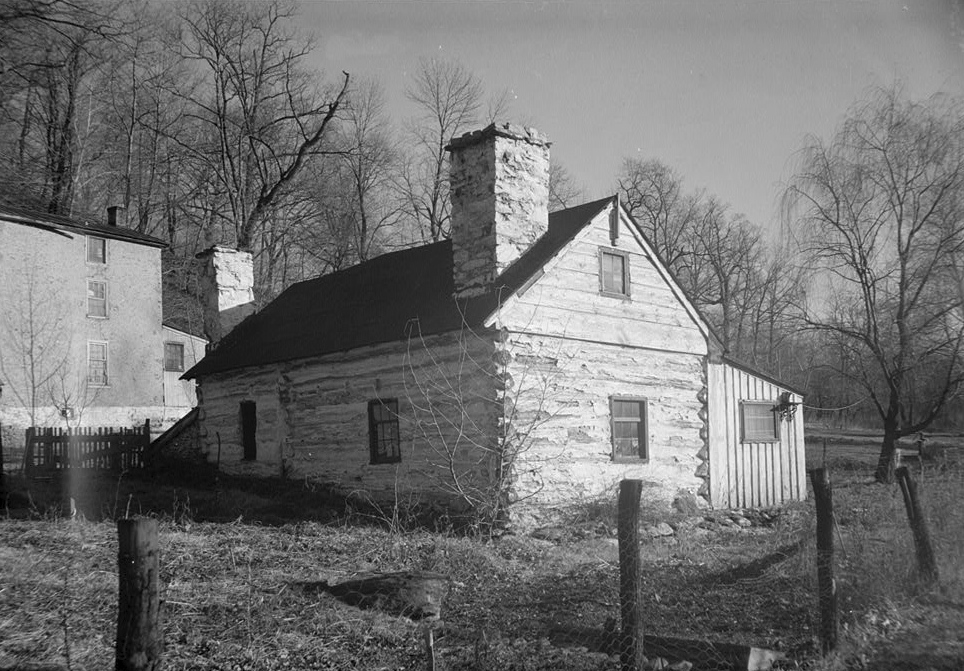
In 1937

== See also ==
- List of the oldest buildings in Pennsylvania
- National Register of Historic Places listings in Delaware County, Pennsylvania
