= Amity Gardens, Pennsylvania =

Unincorporated community in Pennsylvania, US

Amity Gardens
- Census-designated place
- Location of Amity Gardens in Pennsylvania Amity Gardens (the United States)
- Coordinates: 40°16′13″N 75°44′05″W
- Country: United States
- State: Pennsylvania
- County: Berks
- Township: Amity

Area
  - Total: 1.19 sq mi (3.08 km^{2})
  - Land: 1.19 sq mi (3.08 km^{2})
  - Water: 0 sq mi (0.00 km^{2})
- Elevation: 243 ft (74 m)

Population (2020)
  - Total: 3,715
  - Density: 3,128.9/sq mi (1,208.07/km^{2})
- Time zone: UTC-5 (EST)
  - Summer (DST): UTC-4 (EDT)
- ZIP code: 19518
- Area code: 610
- FIPS code: 42-02349

Amity Gardens is a census-designated place (CDP) in Amity Township, Berks County, Pennsylvania, United States. As of the 2020 census, the CDP had a total population of 3,715. The town lends its name to a Fountains of Wayne song.

== Geography ==
Amity Gardens is located at 40°16′13″N 75°44′5″W (40.270155, -75.734834). According to the U.S. Census Bureau, Amity Gardens has a total area of 0.9 square miles (2.3 km^{2}), all land.

== Etymology ==
=== Derivation of the name "Amity" ===
In the "History of Montgomery County", the author records the settlement of some Swedes at Douglassville a few years after 1699 and the connection of this settlement with a group of Germans at New Hanover. A road was laid out from New Hanover to Germantown. Along these roads, the word "Amity" was used to designate a locality. The name was adopted by the inhabitants of the area to symbolize their relations with the Indians. Although Sweden lost the colony in 1638, the Swedish settlers sent a letter to their homeland in 1693 asking for ministers and religious books. In this letter they stated, "We live in great amity with the Indians, who have not done us harm for many years." From this incident, those Swedish settlers who migrated up the Schuylkill beyond the Manatawny called their settlement, Amity.

== Demographics ==
Historical population
Census	Pop.	Note	%±
2000	3,370		—
2010	3,402		0.9%
2020	3,715		9.2%

=== 2020 census ===
As of the 2020 census, Amity Gardens had a population of 3,715. The median age was 40.5 years. 21.4% of residents were under the age of 18 and 18.7% of residents were 65 years of age or older. For every 100 females there were 96.9 males, and for every 100 females age 18 and over there were 91.9 males age 18 and over.

100.0% of residents lived in urban areas, while 0.0% lived in rural areas.

There were 1,415 households in Amity Gardens, of which 31.7% had children under the age of 18 living in them. Of all households, 58.6% were married-couple households, 13.1% were households with a male householder and no spouse or partner present, and 20.3% were households with a female householder and no spouse or partner present. About 22.0% of all households were made up of individuals and 11.5% had someone living alone who was 65 years of age or older.

There were 1,445 housing units, of which 2.1% were vacant. The homeowner vacancy rate was 0.7% and the rental vacancy rate was 2.7%.

Racial composition as of the 2020 census
Race	Number	Percent
White	3,187	85.8%
Black or African American	170	4.6%
American Indian and Alaska Native	3	0.1%
Asian	97	2.6%
Native Hawaiian and Other Pacific Islander	1	0.0%
Some other race	61	1.6%
Two or more races	196	5.3%
Hispanic or Latino (of any race)	181	4.9%

=== 2000 census ===
At the 2000 census, there were 3,370 people, 1,243 households, and 948 families living in the CDP. The population density was 3,543.8 inhabitants per square mile (1,368.3/km^{2}). There were 1,269 housing units at an average density of 1,334.4 per square mile (515.2/km^{2}). The racial makeup of the CDP was 95.01% White, 2.58% African American, 0.06% Native American, 0.83% Asian, 0.03% Pacific Islander, 0.27% from other races, and 1.22% from two or more races. Hispanic or Latino of any race were 1.31%.

There were 1,243 households, 36.8% had children under the age of 18 living with them, 65.4% were married couples living together, 8.0% had a female householder with no husband present, and 23.7% were non-families. 18.7% of households were made up of individuals, and 8.0% were one person aged 65 or older. The average household size was 2.71 and the average family size was 3.12.

The age distribution was 27.1% under the age of 18, 6.6% from 18 to 24, 30.2% from 25 to 44, 25.9% from 45 to 64, and 10.2% 65 or older. The median age was 37 years. For every 100 females, there were 97.0 males. For every 100 females age 18 and over, there were 92.0 males.

The median household income was $60,586 and the median family income was $70,250. Males had a median income of $48,000 versus $32,234 for females. The per capita income for the CDP was $27,614. About 2.1% of families and 3.8% of the population were below the poverty line, including 1.6% of those under age 18 and 12.8% of those age 65 or over.
