= White Horse Tavern (Douglassville, Pennsylvania) =

Historic tavern in Pennsylvania, United States

- U.S. National Register of Historic Places
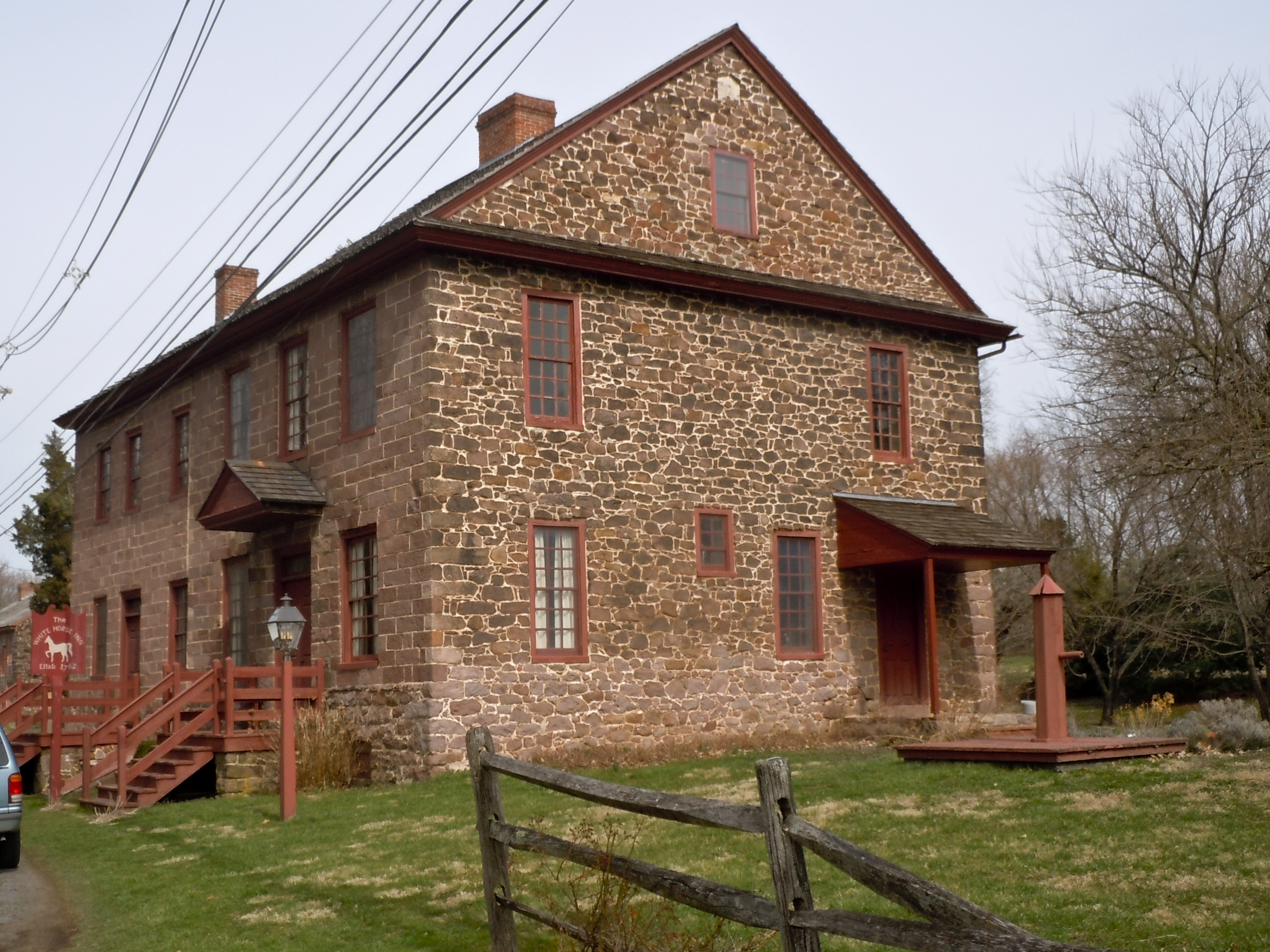
- White Horse Tavern, March 2011

- Location within Pennsylvania Location within the United States
- Location: 509 Old Philadelphia Pike, Douglassville, Amity Township, Pennsylvania
- Coordinates: 40°15′13″N 75°43′31″W
- Area: 1 acre (0.40 ha)
- Built: 1765
- Architectural style: Georgian
- NRHP reference No.: 75001618
- Added to NRHP: April 21, 1975

The White Horse Tavern is an historic inn and tavern in Douglassville, Amity Township, Berks County, Pennsylvania, United States.

Part of the Morlatton Village historic site, it was listed on the National Register of Historic Places in 1975.

== History and architectural features ==
This historic building is situated on the banks of the Schuylkill River. Originally built in 1765, it is a 2 1/2-story, five-bay, sandstone building with a gable roof. A 2 1/2-story, three-bay, addition was erected in 1780.

The building operated as an inn and tavern until 1870, when it was converted to a three-family residence. The house was obtained in 1971, and subsequently restored by the Historic Preservation Trust of Berks County.

It was listed on the National Register of Historic Places in 1975, and is part of the Morlatton Village historic site.

== See also ==
- National Register of Historic Places listings in Berks County, Pennsylvania
