= Mouns Jones House =

Historic house in Pennsylvania, United States

- Old Swede's House
- U.S. National Register of Historic Places
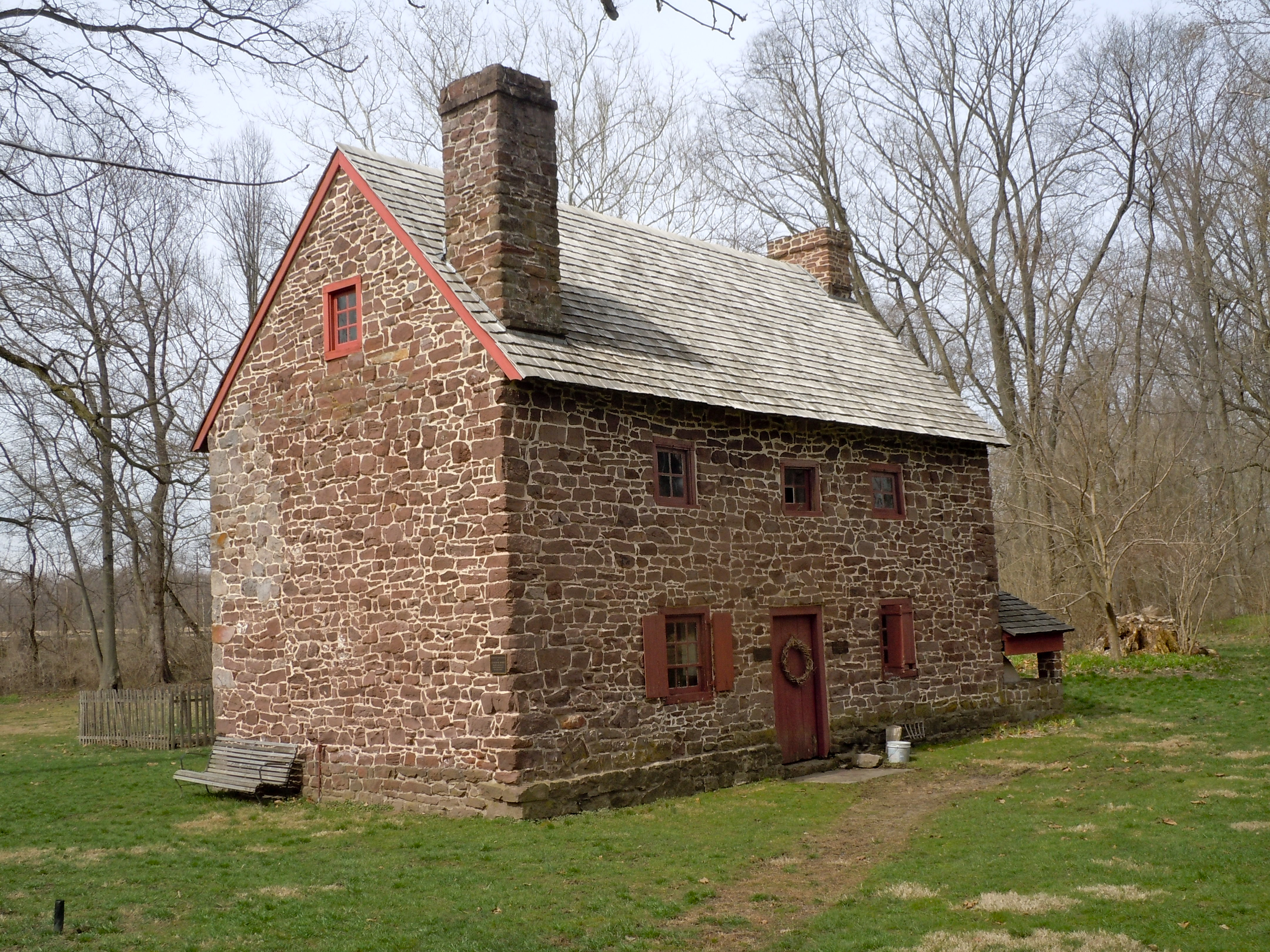
- Old Swede's House, March 2011

- Location within Pennsylvania Location within the United States
- Location: Old Philadelphia Pike, Douglassville, Amity Township, Pennsylvania
- Coordinates: 40°15′12″N 75°43′42″W
- Area: 2 acres (0.81 ha)
- Built: 1716
- Architect: Jones, Mouns
- NRHP reference No.: 74001751
- Added to NRHP: January 21, 1974

The Mouns Jones House, also known as the Old Swede's House, is an historic home that is located in Douglassville, Amity Township, Berks County, Pennsylvania, United States.

It was listed on the National Register of Historic Places in 1974.

== History and architectural features ==
Built in 1686, this historic structure is a 2 1/2-story, three-bay, stone dwelling. It measures 24 ft (7.3 m) by 30 ft (9.1 m) and features a brick chimney for a large, 9 ft (2.7 m) kitchen fireplace. It is the oldest surviving house in Berks County and one of the few remaining examples of a Swedish settler's dwelling. The house was restored by the Historic Preservation Trust of Berks County. It is open to the public periodically during the year as part of the Morlatton Village historic site.

This house was built by Mans Mouce Jonasson, who was born in Kingsessing, Philadelphia on November 10, 1663 and died Amity Township, Berks County, Pennsylvania, March 29, 1727. His wife was Ingeborg Lycan (September 5, 1665 in Gunnarskog, Sweden - December 17, 1749 in Amity Township, Berks County, Pennsylvania, daughter of Peter Nilsson Lyckan. Mans Jonasson was the son of Jonas (Joens) Nilsson who was one of fifty selected soldiers accompanying Governor Printz on the Fourth Expedition to New Sweden and helped construct Fort Nya Elfsborg. He obtained his discharge in 1653, became a Freeman and married Gertrude, the daughter of Sven Gunnarsson.

== Notable Descendants ==
Mans and Ingelborg's great-grandson was Colonel Abraham Bird who served as member of the House of Burgesses, and represented Dunmore County in the Fifth Virginia Convention in 1776.

Additionally, Francis Duke (November 29, 1783 in Berkley, Virginia - December 8, 1836 in Harpers Ferry, West Virginia), speaker of the Virginia House of Delegates from 1812 to 1816 was a descendant.

It was listed on the National Register of Historic Places in 1974.

== See also ==
- National Register of Historic Places listings in Berks County, Pennsylvania
