= Old St. Gabriel's Episcopal Church =

Historic church in Pennsylvania, U.S.

St. Gabriel's Episcopal Church
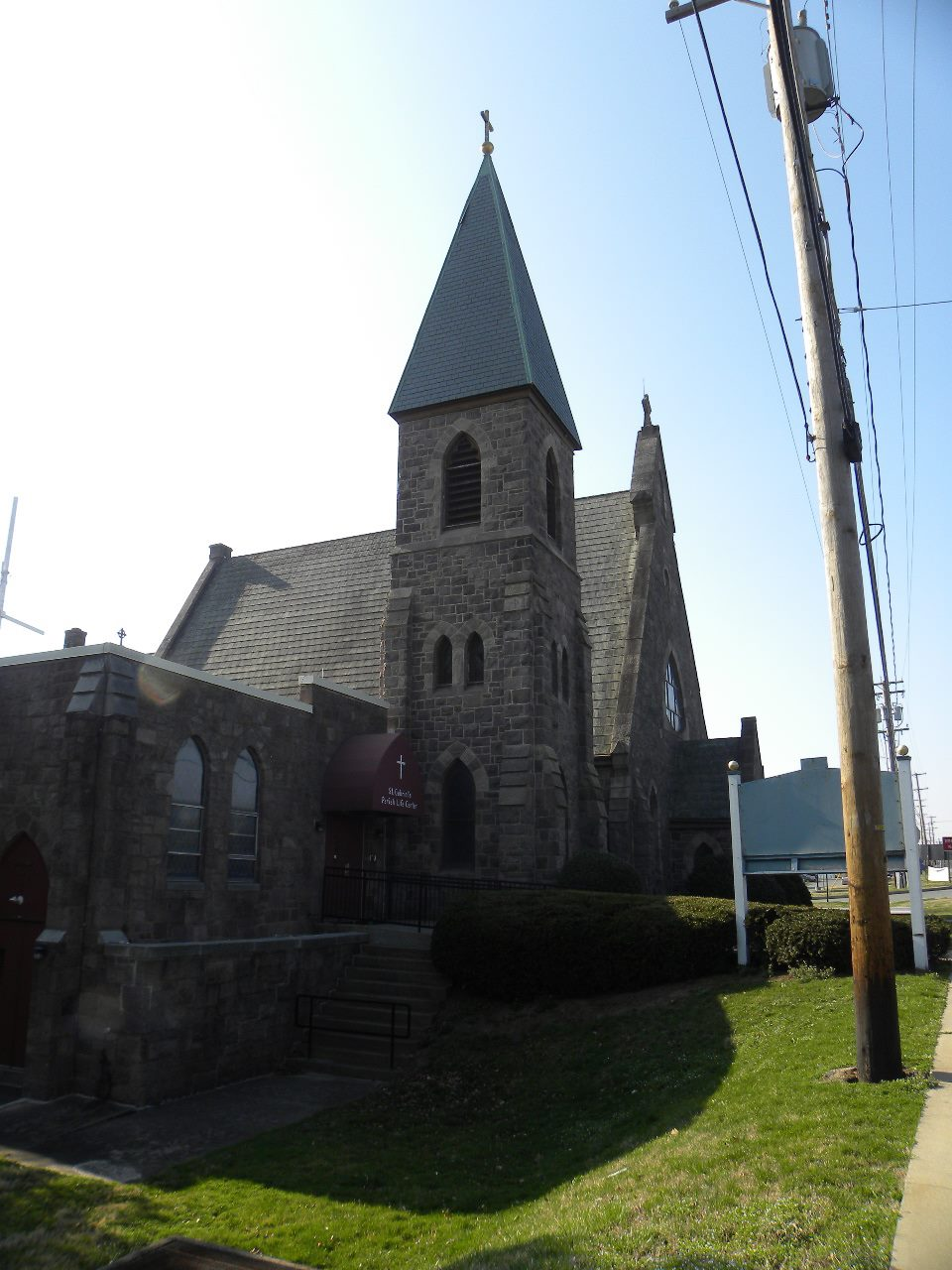

Religion
- Affiliation: Episcopal Church
- District: Diocese of the Susquehanna
- Province: III (Middle Atlantic)

Location
- Interactive map of St. Gabriel's Episcopal Church
- St. Gabriel's Episcopal Church
- U.S. National Register of Historic Places
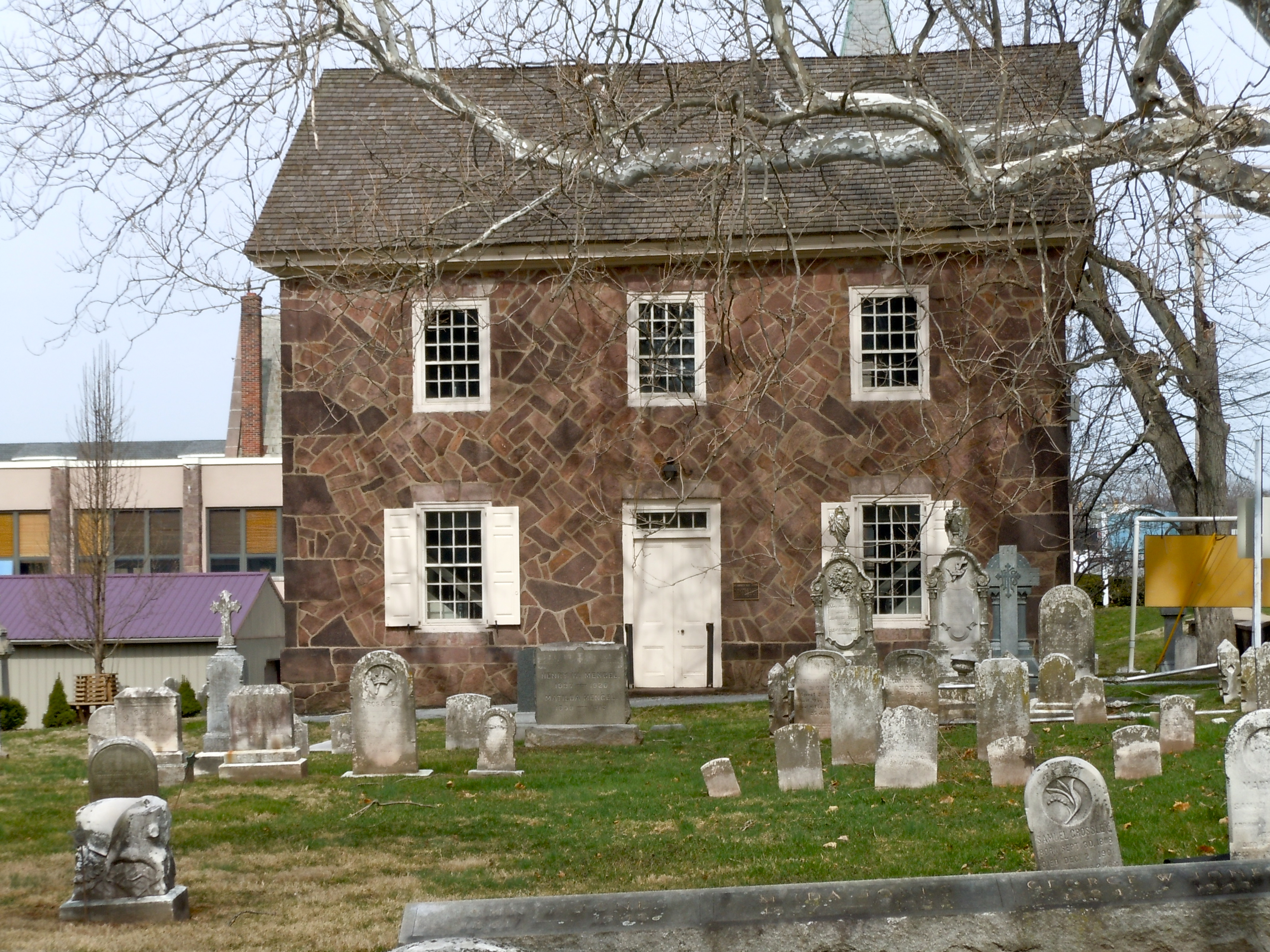
- 1801 Chapel of St. Gabriel's Episcopal Church

- Location within Pennsylvania Location within the United States
- Location: U.S. 422, Douglassville, Amity Township, Berks County, Pennsylvania
- Coordinates: 40°15′26″N 75°43′45″W
- Area: 0.3 acres (0.12 ha)
- Built: 1801
- NRHP reference No.: 78002343
- Added to NRHP: March 08, 1978

St. Gabriel's Episcopal Church is an historic Episcopal Church church located in Douglassville, Pennsylvania. The church is a part of the Diocese of the Susquehanna. The parish reported 226 members in 2023; no membership statistics were reported in 2024 parochial reports. Plate and pledge income for the congregation in 2024 was $273,270 with average Sunday attendance (ASA) of 103.

== History ==
St. Gabriel's was founded in 1720 as a Swedish Lutheran church. In 1760 the church joined the Church of England. The oldest structure is known as Saint Gabriel's 1801 Chapel. It was built in 1801, and is a two-story, three bay by two bay, brownstone building. It features a herringbone design in the stone construction. The interior was restored in 1959. It was listed on the National Register of Historic Places in 1978.

The larger structure was consecrated in 1884. An addition was made in 1959 that contains administrative offices and classrooms. The interior of the 1884 church was remodeled in 2003. In 2005, the existing 1959 portion of the building was remodeled and expanded to include more classrooms and a large parish hall.

The historic cemetery has veterans from American wars, starting with the Revolutionary War (25 veterans) and ending with the Persian Gulf War (one veteran). The one exception is the Spanish-American War.

== List of Clergy ==
- Andreas Rudman, 1701-1707
- Andrew Sandel, 1708-1719
- Samuel Hesselius, 1720-1723
- Assistant Pastors of Wicaco, 1723-1734
- Gabriel Falck, 1735-1745
- Henry M. Muhlenberg, 1748-1752
- John Abraham Lidenius, 1752-1755
- Henry M. Muhlenberg, 1755-1761
- Alexander Murray, 1762–1778, 1790-1793

(During the Revolutionary War period. Reverend Murray returned to England. The Parish was cut off from the Church of England so there were no stated public ministrations.)

- John Wade, 1795-1797
- Caleb Hopkins, 1798-1801
- John Armstrong, 1801-1805
- Caleb Hopkins, 1805-1806
- Levi Bull, 1806-1825
- Caleb J. Good, 1826-1827
- George Mintzer, 1828-1836
- William Homman, 1837-1838
- Henry F. M. Whitesides, 1839
- Oliver A. Shaw, 1840
- George Burker, 1840-1842
- Edmund Leaf, 1844-1868
- Jeremiah Karcher, 1869-1871
- Edmund Leaf, 1872-1876
- John Long, 1877-1886
- Edward J. Koons, 1886-1888
- William DuHamel, 1889-1892
- Samuel McElwee, 1892-1906
- William R. Holloway, 1907-1912
- A. S. H. Winsor, 1912-1914
- William DuHamel, 1915-1928
- Arthur B. Vossler, 1928-1934
- Daniel C. Osborne, 1935-1938
- Irving Angell McGrew, 1939-1942
- Thomas B. Smythe, 1943-1959
- Woodworth B. Allen, Jr., 1959-1962
- Lloyd I. Wolf, 1962-1965
- Kenneth T. Cosbey, 1966-1987
- Calvin C. Adams, 1987-2010
- David Green, 2013-2018
- Andrew D. VanBuren, 2019–present
