= Pont Reading =

Historic house in Pennsylvania, United States

- U.S. National Register of Historic Places
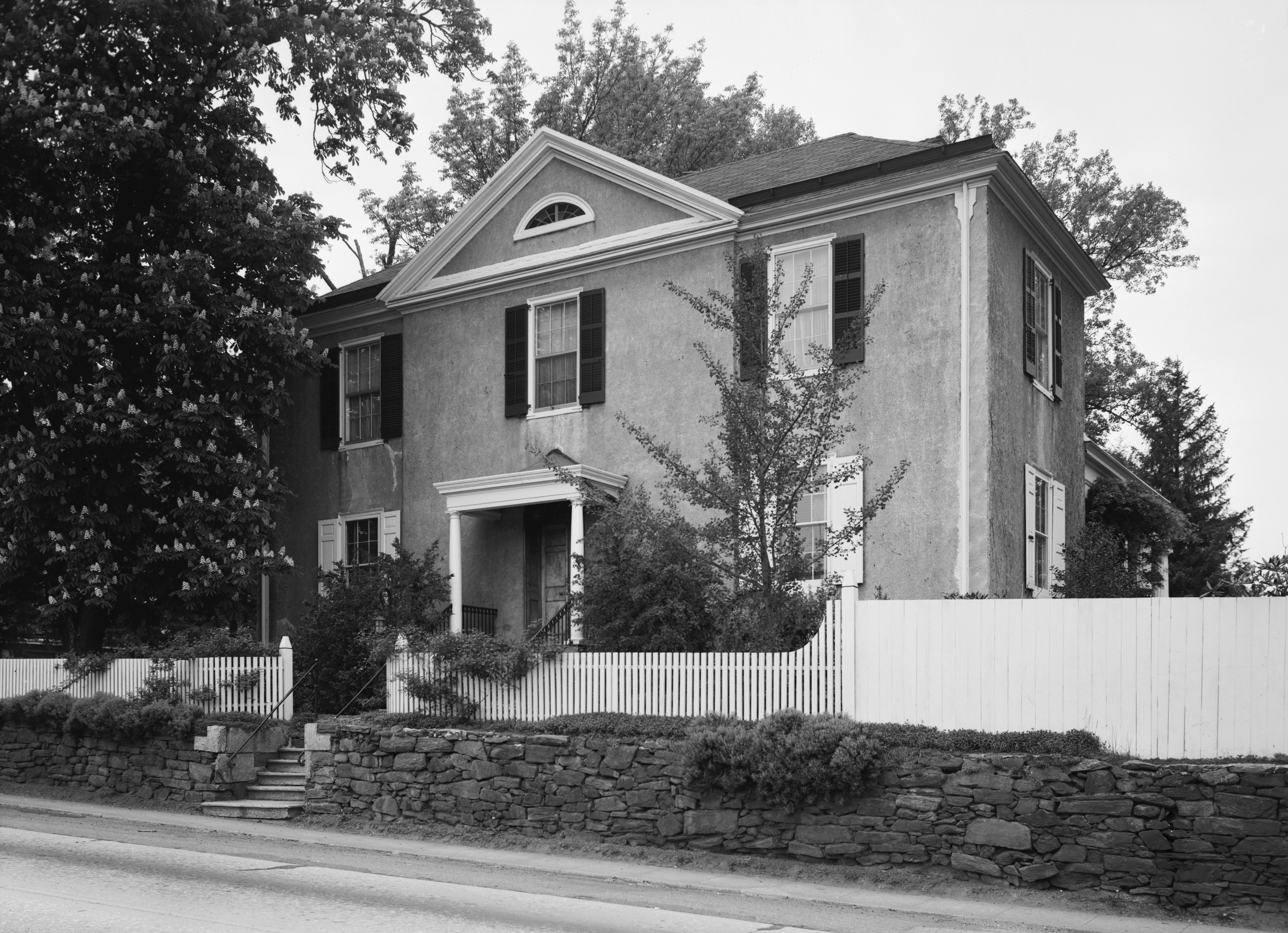
- Historic American Buildings Survey photograph

- Location within Pennsylvania Location within the United States
- Location: 2713 Haverford Road; Ardmore, Pennsylvania
- Coordinates: 39°59′47″N 75°18′10″W
- Area: 1 acre (0.40 ha)
- Built: 1683
- Built by: Humphreys, David; et al.
- NRHP reference No.: 72001116
- Added to NRHP: October 26, 1972

Pont Reading is a historic, American home that is located in the Ardmore section of Haverford Township, Delaware County, Pennsylvania. It was the residence of shipbuilder and architect, Joshua Humphreys who lived there his entire life. Pont Reading was named after his family's homestead, Reading Pont in Wales.

The house, which is a private residence, is listed on the National Register of Historic Places.

== History and architectural features ==
Humphreys was most notable for his design of the famous USS Constitution, or "Old Ironsides". The home, now stuccoed, was originally built in 1730, using stone around a log cabin that dated to 1683. The rear kitchen wing was added in 1813. The building is an excellent example of upper-class colonial architecture.

In March 2007, Cookie Magazine published an article titled "To the Manor Born" about the house and its owners. The article included internal photographs. The house's owners since 2003 (Chris DeWitt/Oscar Yague) oversaw major restoration to maintain the property.

== Gallery ==
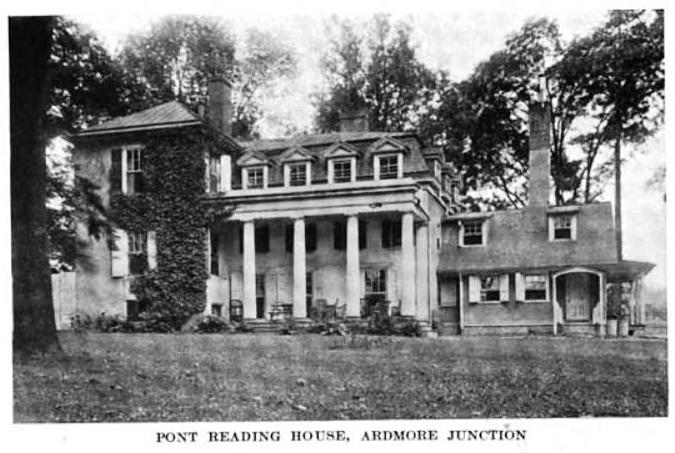
Pont Reading House, photographed circa 1919
