= Douglassville, Pennsylvania =

Unincorporated community in Pennsylvania, US

- Census-designated place
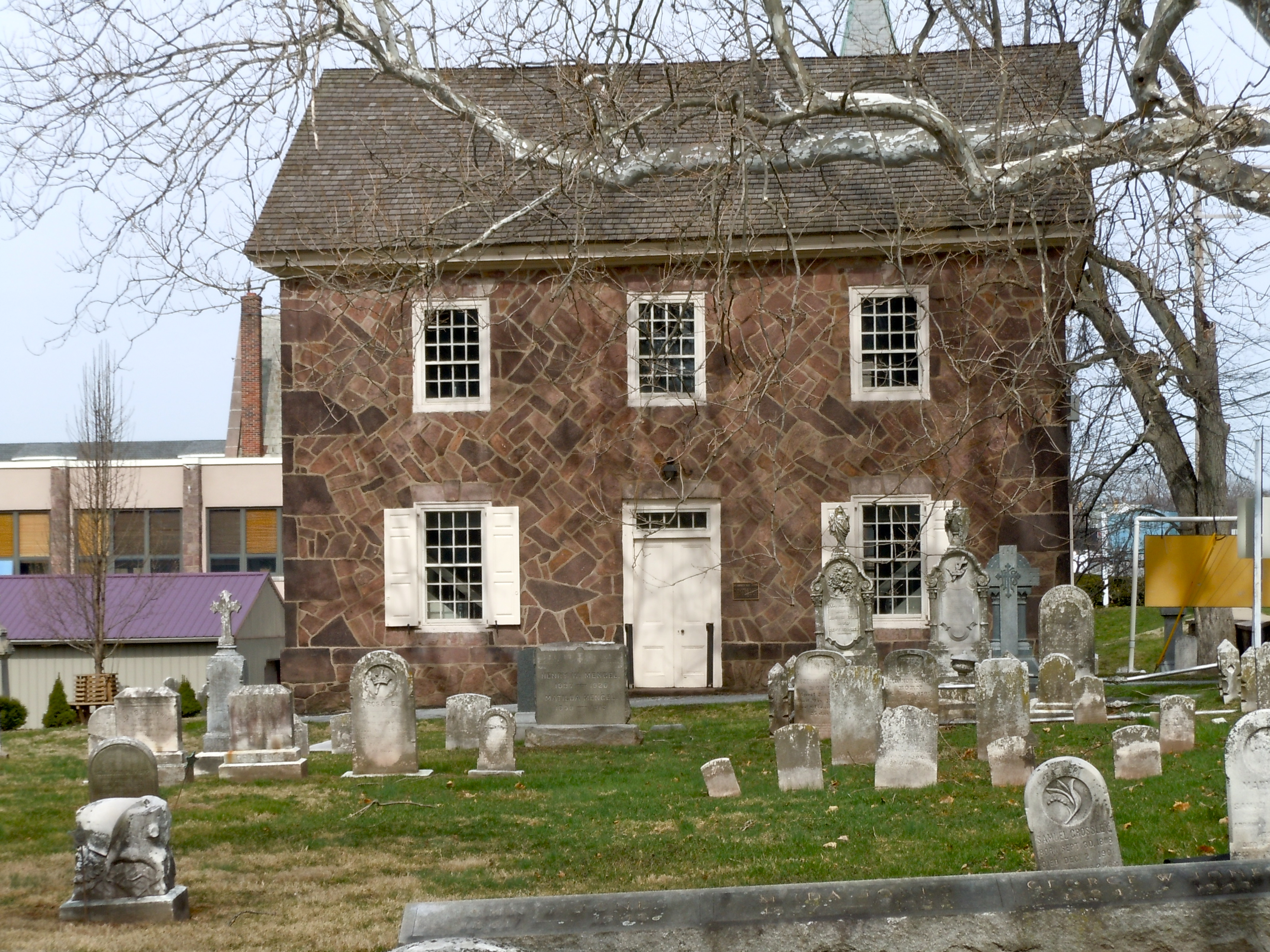
- Old St. Gabriel's Episcopal Church, founded in 1720; this building was built in 1801

- Location within Pennsylvania Location within the United States
- Coordinates: 40°15′28″N 75°43′35″W
- Country: United States
- State: Pennsylvania
- County: Berks
- Township: Amity

Area
  - Total: 0.70 sq mi (1.81 km^{2})
  - Land: 0.64 sq mi (1.67 km^{2})
  - Water: 0.054 sq mi (0.14 km^{2})
- Elevation: 194 ft (59 m)

Population (2020)
  - Total: 518
  - Density: 803/sq mi (309.9/km^{2})
- Time zone: UTC-5 (Eastern (EST))
  - Summer (DST): UTC-4 (EDT)
- ZIP code: 19518
- Area codes: 610 and 484
- GNIS feature ID: 1173428

Douglassville is a census-designated place (CDP) in Amity Township, Berks County, Pennsylvania, United States. Douglassville is situated along U.S. Route 422 and Pennsylvania Route 724. Developments include the Amity Gardens subdivision, the West Ridge subdivision, the Briarwood subdivision, and the High Meadow subdivision. Douglassville also includes Cider Mill and the Woods Edge subdivision along Pennsylvania Route 562. As of the 2020 census, the population of the CDP was 518 residents.

== History ==
Swedish pioneers were the first European settlers in present Berks County on land granted by William Penn. Swedish Lutheran Minister Andreas Rudman secured an order from William Penn on October 21, 1701, setting aside 10,000 acres (40 km^{2}) up the Schuylkill, near Manatawny Creek, for members of his congregation. The boundaries of Amity Township are almost identical to the boundaries of the original area known as the Swedes' tract. Morlatton Village, an early settlement which became part of what is now Douglassville, was Berks County's first settlement site along the Schuylkill River. The settlement later became the location of Old St. Gabriel's Episcopal Church or Old Swedes, founded in 1720 as the oldest church in Berks County. The site also included the Mouns Jones House, built by Swedish settlers in 1716. The house is the oldest documented dwelling in Berks County.

== Geography ==
Douglassville is located on the Schuylkill River and mainly upon its left bank. The CDP has a hot-summer humid continental climate (Dfa) and average monthly temperatures range from 30.7 °F in January to 75.5 °F in July. The hardiness zone is 7a bordering upon 6b.

== Demographics ==
Historical population
Census	Pop.	Note	%±
2020	518		—
U.S. Decennial Census

== Parks and recreation ==
Lake Drive Park and Recreation Area is in the Amity Gardens subdivision. Facilities include basketball and tennis courts, a skateboard park, a pavilion, and a picnic area. Hill Road Park is located in the West Ridge subdivision, and includes a baseball field and a pavilion. Monocacy Hill Preserve is an undeveloped park used for hiking and environmental education outside Douglassville. The park has trails going around the mountain.

== Infrastructure ==
Klein Transportation provides bus service from Douglassville to Reading, Kutztown, Wescosville, Hellertown, and Midtown Manhattan in New York City.

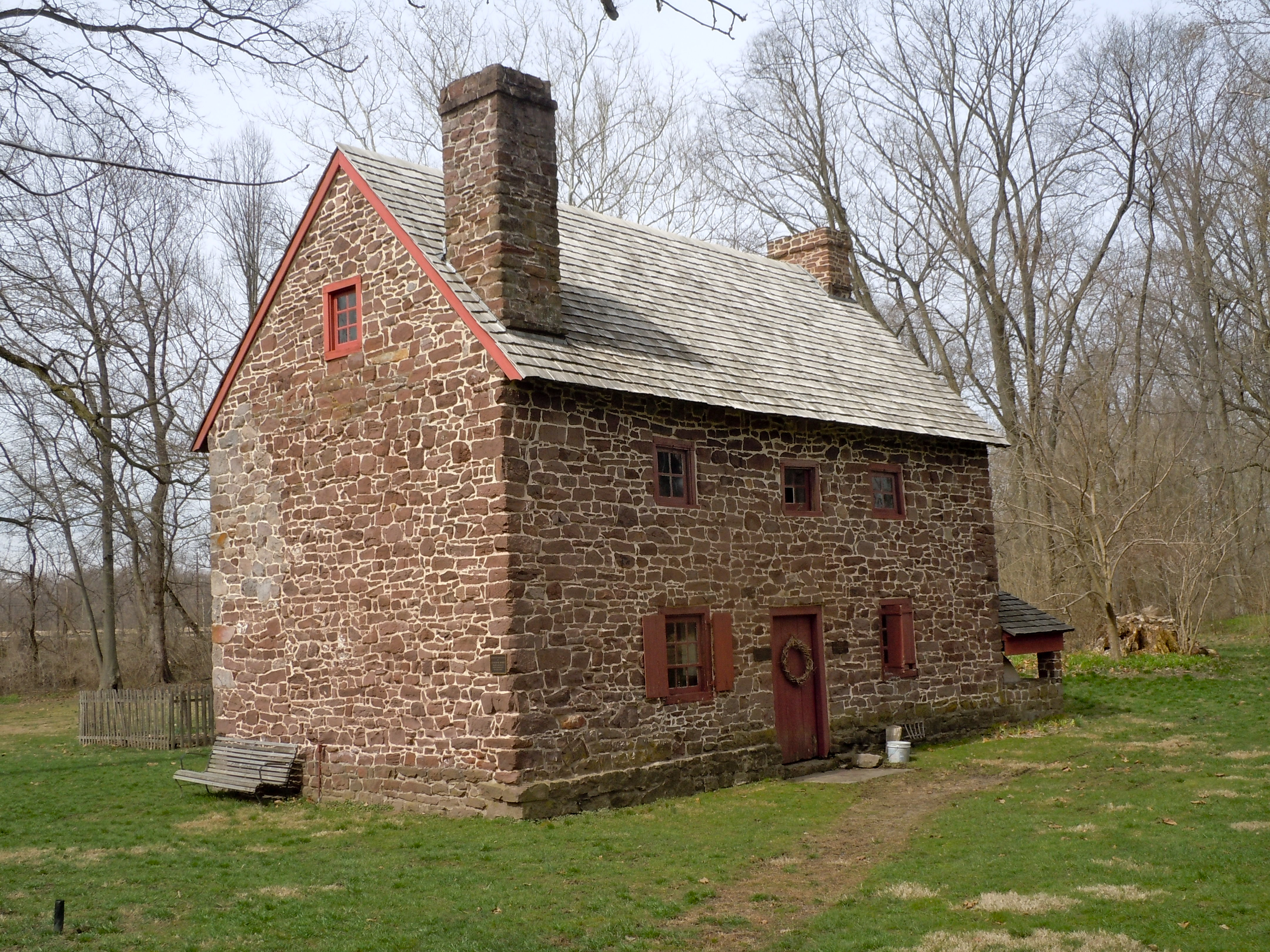
Old Swede's House, built 1716

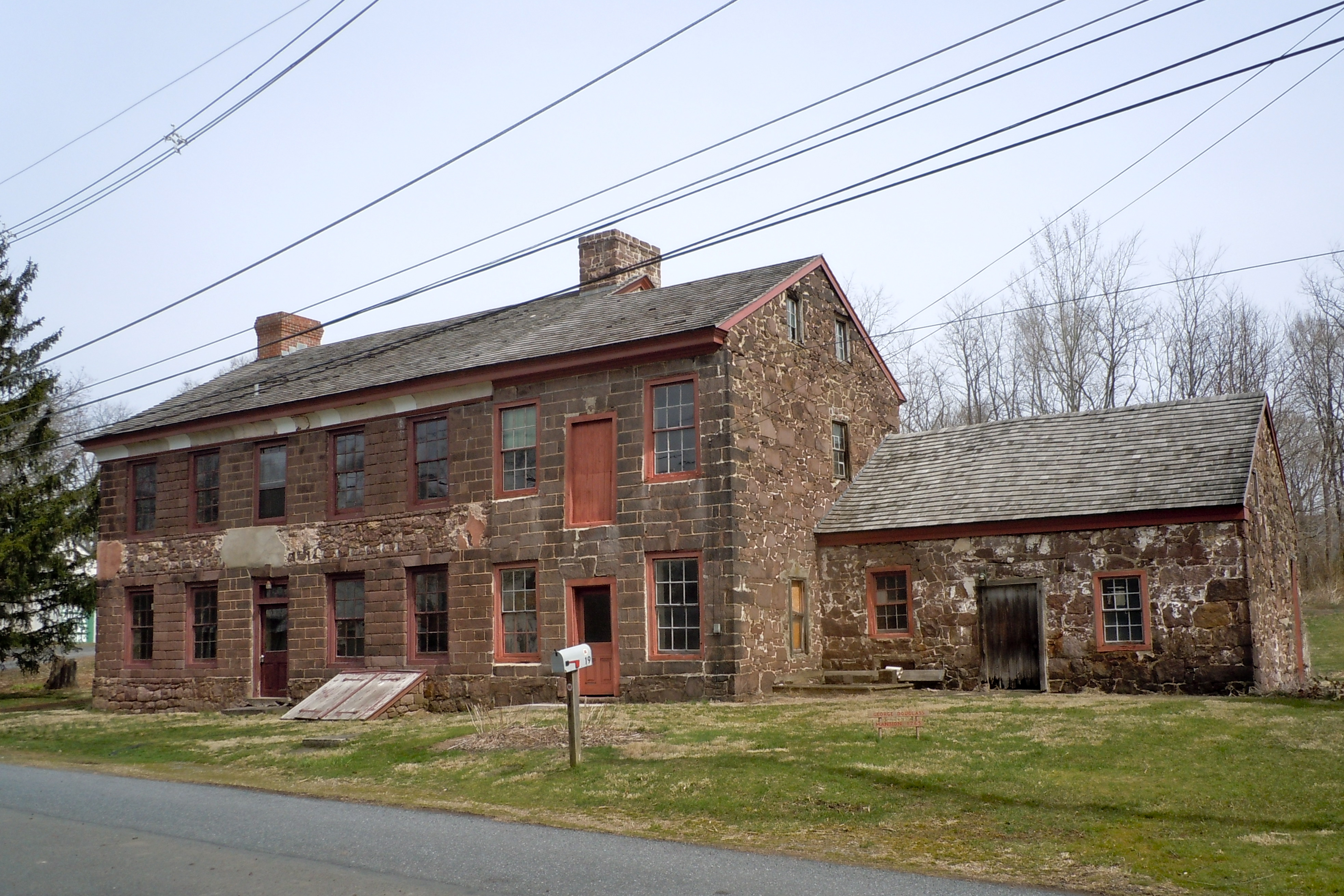
Douglass House

== Notable people ==
- Lucy L. Flippin – actress
- Mark Forrest (born 1996) – professional footballer
- Chris Guiliano (born 2003) – Olympic swimmer
- Alex Horton (born 2003) – professional tenpin bowler, two-time champion on the PBA Tour
- Carmelo Marrero (born 1981) – professional mixed martial artist
- James W. McCord (1924–2017) – CIA officer who participated in the Watergate scandal
- Jacob K. McKenty (1827–1866) – attorney and politician
- Natalie Wojcik (born 1999) – college artistic gymnast
