= 2010 Pennsylvania House of Representatives election =

- November 2, 2010

All 203 seats in the Pennsylvania House of Representatives 102 seats needed for a majority
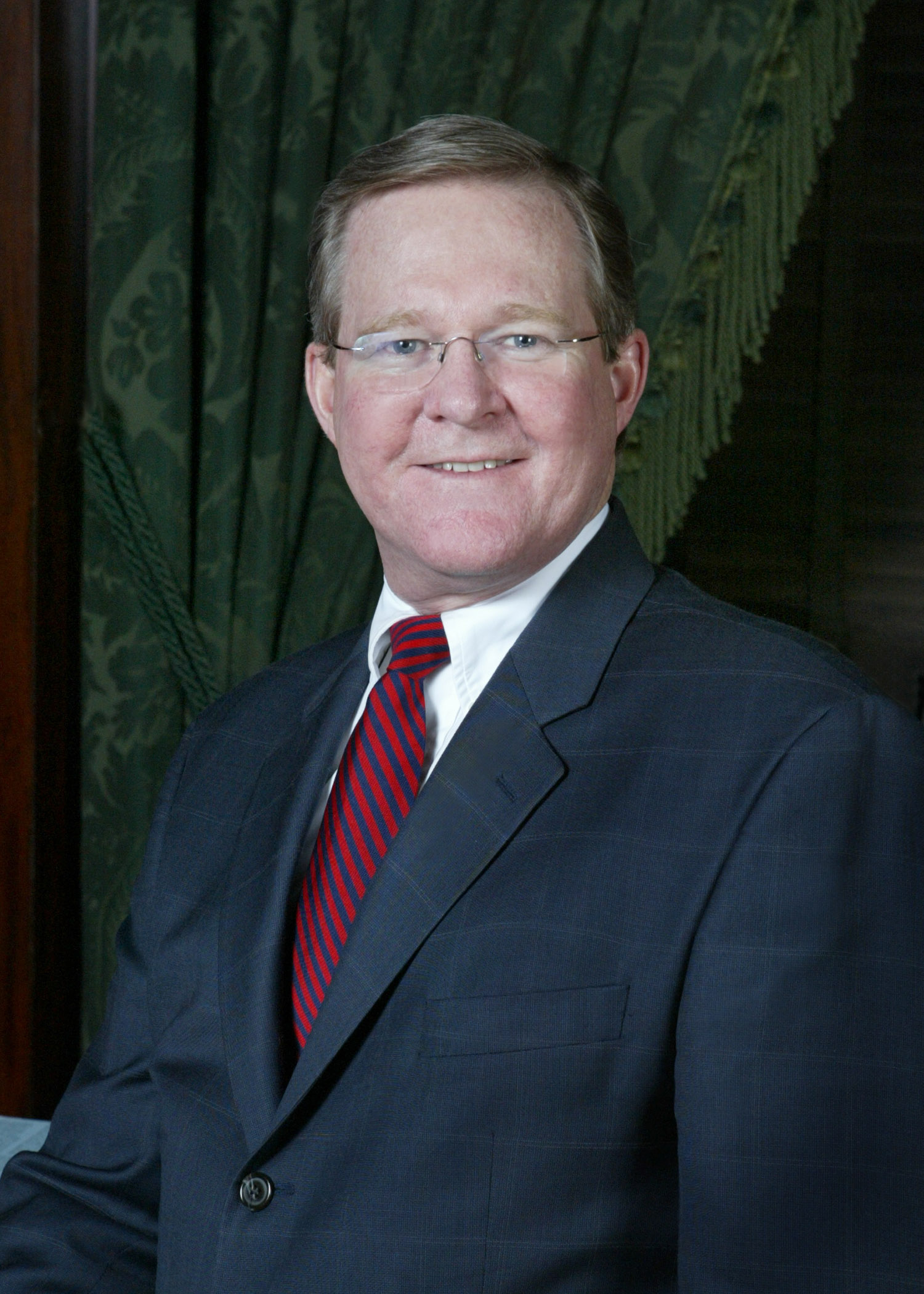

	Majority party	Minority party
Leader	Sam Smith	Keith McCall
Party	Republican	Democratic
Leader since	January 2, 2007	January 6, 2009
Leader's seat	66th	122nd
Last election	99	104
Seats after	112	91
Seat change	▲13	▼13
- Results: Republican hold Republican gain Democratic hold Democratic gain
Speaker before election
Keith McCall
Democratic
Elected Speaker
Sam Smith
Republican

The 2010 elections for the Pennsylvania House of Representatives were held on November 2, 2010, with all districts being contested. Necessary primary elections were held on May 18, 2010. The term of office for those elected in 2010 will run from January 4, 2011, until November 30, 2012. State Representatives are elected for two-year terms, with the entire House of Representatives up for election every two years.

== Overview ==
Affiliation	Seats at Last Election	Seats at End of Legislative Session	Seats after Election	Change Since Last Election
Democratic	104	102	91	-13
Republican	99	101	112	+13

== Predictions ==
Source	Ranking	As of
Governing	Lean R (flip)	November 1, 2010

== 2010 General election ==
District	Party	Incumbent	Status	Party	Candidate	Votes	%
1	Democratic	Patrick Harkins	Re-elected	Democratic	Patrick Harkins	10,621	100.0
2	Democratic	Florindo Fabrizio	Re-elected	Democratic	Florindo Fabrizio	13,869	100.0
3	Democratic	John Hornaman	Re-elected	Democratic	John Hornaman	12,467	53.6
3	Democratic	John Hornaman	Re-elected	Republican	Regina K. Smith	10,812	46.5
4	Republican	Curt Sonney	Re-elected	Republican	Curt Sonney	13,754	72.6
4	Republican	Curt Sonney	Re-elected	Democratic	Gerald Price	5,198	27.4
5	Republican	John R. Evans	Re-elected	Republican	John R. Evans	13,830	100.0
6	Republican	Brad Roae	Re-elected	Republican	Brad Roae	13,135	100.0
7	Democratic	Mark Longietti	Re-elected	Democratic	Mark Longietti	16,253	100.0
8	Republican	Dick Stevenson	Re-elected	Republican	Dick Stevenson	17,694	100.0
9	Democratic	Chris Sainato	Re-elected	Democratic	Chris Sainato	15,448	100.0
10	Democratic	Jaret Gibbons	Re-elected	Democratic	Jaret Gibbons	9,816	52.3
10	Democratic	Jaret Gibbons	Re-elected	Republican	Michael See	8,964	47.7
11	Republican	Brian L. Ellis	Re-elected	Republican	Brian L. Ellis	16,784	100.0
12	Republican	Daryl Metcalfe	Re-elected	Republican	Daryl Metcalfe	19,083	75.4
12	Republican	Daryl Metcalfe	Re-elected	Democratic	Zack Byrnes	6,241	24.6
13	Democratic	Tom Houghton	Defeated	Republican	John Lawrence	12,768	55.0
13	Democratic	Tom Houghton	Defeated	Democratic	Tom Houghton	10,460	45.0
14	Republican	Jim E. Marshall	Re-elected	Republican	Jim E. Marshall	11,590	67.4
14	Republican	Jim E. Marshall	Re-elected	Democratic	Dennis Powell	5,595	32.6
15	Republican	Jim Christiana	Re-elected	Republican	Jim Christiana	13,295	62.3
15	Republican	Jim Christiana	Re-elected	Democratic	Frank E. Bovalino	8,060	37.7
16	Democratic	Robert F. Matzie	Re-elected	Democratic	Robert F. Matzie	13,998	100.0
17	Republican	Michele Brooks	Re-elected	Republican	Michele Brooks	14,957	100.0
18	Republican	Gene DiGirolamo	Re-elected	Republican	Gene DiGirolamo	13,698	100.0
19	Democratic	Jake Wheatley	Re-elected	Democratic	Jake Wheatley	10,688	100.0
20	Democratic	Adam Ravenstahl	Re-elected	Democratic	Adam Ravenstahl	10,590	59.2
20	Democratic	Adam Ravenstahl	Re-elected	Republican	Alex Dubart	6,359	35.6
20	Democratic	Adam Ravenstahl	Re-elected	Independent	Kenneth J. Vybiral, Jr.	928	5.2
21	Democratic	Dom Costa	Re-elected	Democratic	Dom Costa	14,589	100.0
22	Democratic	Chelsa Wagner	Re-elected	Democratic	Chelsa Wagner	14,655	100.0
23	Democratic	Dan Frankel	Re-elected	Democratic	Dan Frankel	16,078	79.9
23	Democratic	Dan Frankel	Re-elected	Republican	Daniel Ulrich Wiseman	4,039	20.1
24	Democratic	Joseph Preston, Jr.	Re-elected	Democratic	Joseph Preston, Jr.	14,011	100.0
25	Democratic	Joe Markosek	Re-elected	Democratic	Joe Markosek	11,663	53.8
25	Democratic	Joe Markosek	Re-elected	Republican	Mike Doyle	10,036	46.2
26	Republican	Tim Hennessey	Re-elected	Republican	Tim Hennessey	12,052	56.7
26	Republican	Tim Hennessey	Re-elected	Democratic	Fern B. Kauffman	9,209	43.3
27	Democratic	Dan Deasy	Re-elected	Democratic	Dan Deasy	11,495	76.0
27	Democratic	Dan Deasy	Re-elected	Reform	Frank Liberatore	3,631	24.0
28	Republican	Mike Turzai	Re-elected	Republican	Mike Turzai	21,607	77.4
28	Republican	Mike Turzai	Re-elected	Democratic	Sharon Brown	6,322	22.6
29	Republican	Bernie O'Neill	Re-elected	Republican	Bernie O'Neill	16,144	63.7
29	Republican	Bernie O'Neill	Re-elected	Democratic	Frank Fineberg	9,182	36.3
30	Republican	Randy Vulakovich	Re-elected	Republican	Randy Vulakovich	22,024	100.0
31	Democratic	Steve Santarsiero	Re-elected	Democratic	Steve Santarsiero	12,873	50.4
31	Democratic	Steve Santarsiero	Re-elected	Republican	Robert Ciervo	12,684	49.6
32	Democratic	Anthony M. DeLuca	Re-elected	Democratic	Anthony M. DeLuca	15,693	100.0
33	Democratic	Frank Dermody	Re-elected	Democratic	Frank Dermody	11,254	56.3
33	Democratic	Frank Dermody	Re-elected	Republican	Gerry Vaerewyck	8,748	43.7
34	Democratic	Paul Costa	Re-elected	Democratic	Paul Costa	15,430	100.0
35	Democratic	Marc Gergely	Re-elected	Democratic	Marc Gergely	12,412	100.0
36	Democratic	Harry Readshaw	Re-elected	Democratic	Harry Readshaw	14,081	100.0
37	Republican	Thomas C. Creighton	Re-elected	Republican	Thomas C. Creighton	17,612	100.0
38	Democratic	William C. Kortz	Re-elected	Democratic	William C. Kortz	14,427	100.0
39	Democratic	David Levdansky	Defeated	Republican	Rick Saccone	10,651	50.3
39	Democratic	David Levdansky	Defeated	Democratic	David Levdansky	10,526	49.7
40	Republican	John A. Maher	Re-elected	Republican	John A. Maher	21,276	100.0
41	Republican	Katie True	Retired	Republican	Ryan Aument	15,563	66.2
41	Republican	Katie True	Retired	Democratic	Gerald E. Policoff	7,958	33.8
42	Democratic	Matthew H. Smith	Re-elected	Democratic	Matthew H. Smith	15,505	59.8
42	Democratic	Matthew H. Smith	Re-elected	Republican	Sue Means	10,406	40.2
43	Republican	Scott W. Boyd	Re-elected	Republican	Scott W. Boyd	16,722	100.0
44	Republican	Mark Mustio	Re-elected	Republican	Mark Mustio	17,174	69.8
44	Republican	Mark Mustio	Re-elected	Democratic	Ray Uhric	7,431	30.2
45	Democratic	Nick Kotik	Re-elected	Democratic	Nick Kotik	12,035	57.1
45	Democratic	Nick Kotik	Re-elected	Republican	Aaron Kime	9,032	42.9
46	Democratic	Jesse J. White	Re-elected	Democratic	Jesse J. White	11,266	54.2
46	Democratic	Jesse J. White	Re-elected	Republican	Gregory E. DeLuca	9,539	45.9
47	Republican	Keith J. Gillespie	Re-elected	Republican	Keith J. Gillespie	16,818	72.8
47	Republican	Keith J. Gillespie	Re-elected	Democratic	Eric P. Wolfgang	6,292	27.2
48	Democratic	Tim Solobay	Elected to State Senate	Democratic	Brandon P. Neuman	10,481	52.6
48	Democratic	Tim Solobay	Elected to State Senate	Republican	Cody Knotts	9,441	47.4
49	Democratic	Peter Daley	Re-elected	Democratic	Peter Daley	8,776	54.5
49	Democratic	Peter Daley	Re-elected	Republican	Richard Massafra	7,324	45.5
50	Democratic	Bill DeWeese	Re-elected	Democratic	Bill DeWeese	8,477	52.5
50	Democratic	Bill DeWeese	Re-elected	Republican	Richard A. Yeager	7,667	47.5
51	Democratic	Timothy S. Mahoney	Re-elected	Democratic	Timothy S. Mahoney	9,803	100.0
52	Democratic	Deberah Kula	Re-elected	Democratic	Deberah Kula	10,854	100.0
53	Republican	Robert Godshall	Re-elected	Republican	Robert Godshall	12,789	65.2
53	Republican	Robert Godshall	Re-elected	Democratic	Jack Hansen	6,348	32.4
53	Republican	Robert Godshall	Re-elected	Green	Edward R. Bonsell	476	2.4
54	Democratic	John Pallone	Defeated	Republican	Eli Evankovich	12,355	59.7
54	Democratic	John Pallone	Defeated	Democratic	John Pallone	8,329	40.3
55	Democratic	Joseph Petrarca, Jr.	Re-elected	Democratic	Joseph Petrarca, Jr.	12,470	100.0
56	Democratic	James E. Casorio, Jr.	Defeated	Republican	George Dunbar	11,363	51.8
56	Democratic	James E. Casorio, Jr.	Defeated	Democratic	James E. Casorio, Jr.	10,572	48.2
57	Republican	Tim Krieger	Re-elected	Republican	Tim Krieger	12,827	67.4
57	Republican	Tim Krieger	Re-elected	Democratic	Michael J. Kester	4,791	25.2
57	Republican	Tim Krieger	Re-elected	Independent	Ronald M. Gazze	1,412	7.4
58	Democratic	Ted Harhai	Re-elected	Democratic	Ted Harhai	10,695	56.2
58	Democratic	Ted Harhai	Re-elected	Republican	Rob Ferguson	8,349	43.8
59	Republican	Mike Reese	Re-elected	Republican	Mike Reese	19,694	100.0
60	Republican	Jeff Pyle	Re-elected	Republican	Jeff Pyle	12,972	68.8
60	Republican	Jeff Pyle	Re-elected	Democratic	Jo Ellen Bowman	5,877	31.2
61	Republican	Kate M. Harper	Re-elected	Republican	Kate M. Harper	14,744	58.9
61	Republican	Kate M. Harper	Re-elected	Democratic	Mary Lou Readinger	10,303	41.1
62	Republican	Dave L. Reed	Re-elected	Republican	Dave L. Reed	16,049	100.0
63	Republican	Donna Oberlander	Re-elected	Republican	Donna Oberlander	15,398	88.8
63	Republican	Donna Oberlander	Re-elected	Libertarian	Michael J. Robertson	1,939	11.2
64	Republican	Scott Hutchinson	Re-elected	Republican	Scott Hutchinson	13,172	84.2
64	Republican	Scott Hutchinson	Re-elected	Libertarian	Vance H. Mays	2,473	15.8
65	Republican	Kathy Rapp	Re-elected	Republican	Kathy Rapp	13,476	100.0
66	Republican	Samuel H. Smith	Re-elected	Republican	Samuel H. Smith	11,009	68.4
66	Republican	Samuel H. Smith	Re-elected	Democratic	Dennis J. Peck	3,502	21.8
66	Republican	Samuel H. Smith	Re-elected	Independent	Luther E. Yoas, Sr.	1,575	9.8
67	Republican	Martin Causer	Re-elected	Republican	Martin Causer	12,851	100.0
68	Republican	Matt E. Baker	Re-elected	Republican	Matt E. Baker	15,709	100.0
69	Republican	Carl Walker Metzgar	Re-elected	Republican	Carl Walker Metzgar	18,202	100.0
70	Democratic	Matthew Bradford	Re-elected	Democratic	Matthew Bradford	11,841	52.5
70	Democratic	Matthew Bradford	Re-elected	Republican	Jay R. Moyer	10,698	47.5
71	Democratic	Bryan Barbin	Re-elected	Democratic	Bryan Barbin	8,931	50.1
71	Democratic	Bryan Barbin	Re-elected	Republican	Jim Rigby	8,895	49.9
72	Democratic	Frank Burns	Re-elected	Democratic	Frank Burns	18,461	100.0
73	Democratic	Gary Haluska	Re-elected	Democratic	Gary Haluska	10,381	61.1
73	Democratic	Gary Haluska	Re-elected	Republican	Stephen J. Shuagis	6,599	38.9
74	Democratic	Bud George	Re-elected	Democratic	Bud George	8,900	52.0
74	Democratic	Bud George	Re-elected	Republican	Glenn Johnston	8,223	48.0
75	Republican	Matt Gabler	Re-elected	Republican	Matt Gabler	12,727	72.2
75	Republican	Matt Gabler	Re-elected	Democratic	Frank Straub	4,907	27.8
76	Democratic	Mike Hanna	Re-elected	Democratic	Mike Hanna	9,412	59.1
76	Democratic	Mike Hanna	Re-elected	Republican	Daryl Schafer	6,118	38.4
76	Democratic	Mike Hanna	Re-elected	Constitution	Scott Stout	392	2.5
77	Democratic	Scott Conklin	Re-elected	Democratic	Scott Conklin	11,576	56.3
77	Democratic	Scott Conklin	Re-elected	Republican	Joyce Haas	8,972	43.7
78	Republican	Dick Hess	Re-elected	Republican	Dick Hess	18,803	100.0
79	Republican	Richard Geist	Re-elected	Republican	Richard Geist	11,796	100.0
80	Republican	Jerry Stern	Re-elected	Republican	Jerry Stern	16,925	100.0
81	Republican	Mike Fleck	Re-elected	Republican	Mike Fleck	14,628	100.0
82	Republican	Adam Harris	Re-elected	Republican	Adam Harris	15,356	100.0
83	Democratic	Rick Mirabito	Re-elected	Democratic	Rick Mirabito	8,584	52.4
83	Democratic	Rick Mirabito	Re-elected	Republican	Dave Huffman	7,792	47.6
84	Republican	Garth Everett	Re-elected	Republican	Garth Everett	15,694	100.0
85	Republican	Russ Fairchild	Retired	Republican	Fred Keller	11,408	66.0
85	Republican	Russ Fairchild	Retired	Democratic	Trey Casimir	4,319	25.0
85	Republican	Russ Fairchild	Retired	Libertarian	Erik Viker	1,549	9.0
86	Republican	Mark Keller	Re-elected	Republican	Mark Keller	17,393	100.0
87	Republican	Glen Grell	Re-elected	Republican	Glen Grell	18,780	71.3
87	Republican	Glen Grell	Re-elected	Democratic	Angela West	7,569	28.7
88	Republican	Sheryl M. Delozier	Re-elected	Republican	Sheryl M. Delozier	19,198	100.0
89	Republican	Bob Kauffman	Re-elected	Republican	Bob Kauffman	15,886	86.0
89	Republican	Bob Kauffman	Re-elected	Independent	Blyden B. Potts	2,592	14.0
90	Republican	Todd Rock	Re-elected	Republican	Todd Rock	18,336	100.0
91	Republican	Dan Moul	Re-elected	Republican	Dan Moul	14,197	69.7
91	Republican	Dan Moul	Re-elected	Democratic	Derf W. Maitland	6,159	30.3
92	Republican	Scott Perry	Re-elected	Republican	Scott Perry	20,552	100.0
93	Republican	Ron Miller	Re-elected	Republican	Ron Miller	17,492	71.6
93	Republican	Ron Miller	Re-elected	Democratic	Linda E. Small	6,955	28.5
94	Republican	Stan Saylor	Re-elected	Republican	Stan Saylor	14,818	71.8
94	Republican	Stan Saylor	Re-elected	Democratic	Metta Barbour	5,823	28.2
95	Democratic	Eugene DePasquale	Re-elected	Democratic	Eugene DePasquale'	9,801	100.0
96	Democratic	Mike Sturla	Re-elected	Democratic	Mike Sturla	6,910	61.9
96	Democratic	Mike Sturla	Re-elected	Republican	Tom Garmon, Jr.	4,246	38.1
97	Republican	John C. Bear	Re-elected	Republican	John C. Bear	17,937	72.2
97	Republican	John C. Bear	Re-elected	Democratic	F. Patrick O'Keeffe	6,897	27.8
98	Republican	David Hickernell	Re-elected	Republican	David Hickernell	15,703	100.0
99	Republican	Gordon Denlinger	Re-elected	Republican	Gordon Denlinger	14,175	100.0
100	Republican	Bryan Cutler	Re-elected	Republican	Bryan Cutler	13,791	100.0
101	Republican	Mauree Gingrich	Re-elected	Republican	Mauree Gingrich	12,308	70.2
101	Republican	Mauree Gingrich	Re-elected	Democratic	Patricia K. Stephens	3,697	21.1
101	Republican	Mauree Gingrich	Re-elected	Independent	Richard L. Mase, Sr.	1,534	8.8
102	Republican	RoseMarie Swanger	Re-elected	Republican	RoseMarie Swanger	18,225	100.0
103	Democratic	Ron Buxton	Re-elected	Democratic	Ron Buxton	13,337	100.0
104	Republican	Sue Helm	Re-elected	Republican	Sue Helm	11,579	50.7
104	Republican	Sue Helm	Re-elected	Democratic	Gene Stilp	11,264	49.3
105	Republican	Ron Marsico	Re-elected	Republican	Ron Marsico	21,090	100.0
106	Republican	John D. Payne	Re-elected	Republican	John D. Payne	15,017	69.6
106	Republican	John D. Payne	Re-elected	Democratic	Phyllis Bennett	6,554	30.4
107	Democratic	Robert Belfanti	Retired	Republican	Kurt A. Masser	10,814	67.0
107	Democratic	Robert Belfanti	Retired	Democratic	George L. Zalar	5,335	33.0
108	Republican	Merle Phillips	Retired	Republican	Lynda Schlegel-Culver	13,210	76.6
108	Republican	Merle Phillips	Retired	Democratic	Antonio D. Michetti	4,044	23.4
109	Republican	David R. Millard	Re-elected	Republican	David R. Millard	10,605	64.8
109	Republican	David R. Millard	Re-elected	Democratic	Dan Rae	4,852	29.7
109	Republican	David R. Millard	Re-elected	Libertarian	Thomas Anderson	899	5.5
110	Republican	Tina Pickett	Re-elected	Republican	Tina Pickett	15,169	100.0
111	Republican	Sandra Major	Re-elected	Republican	Sandra Major	14,136	73.6
111	Republican	Sandra Major	Re-elected	Democratic	Jim Knapp	3,992	20.8
111	Republican	Sandra Major	Re-elected	Green	Jay Sweeney	1,084	5.6
112	Democratic	Kenneth J. Smith	Re-elected	Democratic	Kenneth J. Smith	9,169	57.4
112	Democratic	Kenneth J. Smith	Re-elected	Republican	Lee Morgan	6,818	42.7
113	Democratic	Kevin P. Murphy	Re-elected	Democratic	Kevin P. Murphy	11,980	66.1
113	Democratic	Kevin P. Murphy	Re-elected	Republican	Mike Lapolla	6,134	33.9
114	Democratic	James Wansacz	Ran for State Senate	Democratic	Sid Michaels Kavulich	11,683	56.2
114	Democratic	James Wansacz	Ran for State Senate	Republican	Daniel R. Naylor	9,095	43.8
115	Democratic	Edward Staback	Re-elected	Democratic	Edward Staback	13,020	63.7
115	Democratic	Edward Staback	Re-elected	Republican	Theresa Kane	7,428	36.3
116	Democratic	Todd A. Eachus	Defeated	Republican	Tarah Toohil	9,702	54.9
116	Democratic	Todd A. Eachus	Defeated	Democratic	Todd A. Eachus	7,967	45.1
117	Republican	Karen Boback	Re-elected	Republican	Karen Boback	15,834	81.6
117	Republican	Karen Boback	Re-elected	Democratic	Richard Shermanski	3,573	18.4
118	Democratic	Michael B. Carroll	Re-elected	Democratic	Michael B. Carroll	10,613	59.2
118	Democratic	Michael B. Carroll	Re-elected	Republican	Terrence O'Connor	7,307	40.8
119	Democratic	John Yudichak	Elected to State Senate	Democratic	Gerald Mullery	8,631	51.9
119	Democratic	John Yudichak	Elected to State Senate	Republican	Rick Arnold	7,274	43.7
119	Democratic	John Yudichak	Elected to State Senate	Libertarian	Brian R. Bergman	741	4.5
120	Democratic	Phyllis Mundy	Re-elected	Democratic	Phyllis Mundy	10,153	53.0
120	Democratic	Phyllis Mundy	Re-elected	Republican	Bill Goldsworthy	6,154	32.1
120	Democratic	Phyllis Mundy	Re-elected	Libertarian	Tim Mullen	2,858	14.9
121	Democratic	Eddie Day Pashinski	Re-elected	Democratic	Eddie Day Pashinski	9,444	71.6
121	Democratic	Eddie Day Pashinski	Re-elected	Republican	James O'Meara, Sr.	3,751	28.4
122	Democratic	Keith R. McCall	Retired	Republican	Doyle Heffley	10,817	56.4
122	Democratic	Keith R. McCall	Retired	Democratic	Justin Yaich	8,375	43.6
123	Democratic	Neal Goodman	Re-elected	Democratic	Neal Goodman	10,646	65.9
123	Democratic	Neal Goodman	Re-elected	Republican	Ettore G. DiCasimirro	5,519	34.1
124	Republican	Jerry Knowles	Re-elected	Republican	Jerry Knowles	13,219	63.8
124	Republican	Jerry Knowles	Re-elected	Democratic	Jeffrey Faust	5,382	26.0
124	Republican	Jerry Knowles	Re-elected	Independent	Dante Picciano	2,109	10.2
125	Democratic	Tim Seip	Defeated	Republican	Mike Tobash	10,657	54.2
125	Democratic	Tim Seip	Defeated	Democratic	Tim Seip	8,521	43.3
125	Democratic	Tim Seip	Defeated	No party affiliation	Dennis Baylor	481	2.5
126	Democratic	Dante Santoni	Re-elected	Democratic	Dante Santoni	9,759	62.1
126	Democratic	Dante Santoni	Re-elected	Republican	Roger Voit	5,962	37.9
127	Democratic	Thomas Caltagirone	Re-elected	Democratic	Thomas Caltagirone	7,050	100.0
128	Republican	Sam Rohrer	Ran for Governor	Republican	Mark M. Gillen	14,699	65.0
128	Republican	Sam Rohrer	Ran for Governor	Democratic	Bryan P. Boughter	7,923	35.0
129	Republican	Jim A. Cox	Re-elected	Republican	Jim A. Cox	16,451	100.0
130	Democratic	David R. Kessler	Defeated	Republican	David M. Maloney	12,748	57.3
130	Democratic	David R. Kessler	Defeated	Democratic	David R. Kessler	9,285	42.7
131	Republican	Karen D. Beyer	Lost primary	Republican	Justin Simmons	10,742	56.9
131	Republican	Karen D. Beyer	Lost primary	Democratic	Mike Horton	8,144	43.1
132	Democratic	Jennifer Mann	Re-elected	Democratic	Jennifer Mann	9,142	100.0
133	Democratic	Joseph F. Brennan	Re-elected	Democratic	Joseph F. Brennan	7,956	62.6
133	Democratic	Joseph F. Brennan	Re-elected	Republican	David Moloney	4,753	37.4
134	Republican	Doug Reichley	Re-elected	Republican	Doug Reichley	18,184	68.0
134	Republican	Doug Reichley	Re-elected	Democratic	Patrick J. Slattery	8,545	32.0
135	Democratic	Steve Samuelson	Re-elected	Democratic	Steve Samuelson	12,963	100.0
136	Democratic	Robert L. Freeman	Re-elected	Democratic	Robert L. Freeman	9,965	64.2
136	Democratic	Robert L. Freeman	Re-elected	Republican	Ron Shegda	5,552	35.8
137	Democratic	Richard Grucela	Retired	Republican	Joe Emrick	13,527	62.1
137	Democratic	Richard Grucela	Retired	Democratic	Charles Dertinger	8,261	37.9
138	Republican	Marcia Hahn	Re-elected	Republican	Marcia Hahn	22,097	100.0
139	Republican	Michael Peifer	Re-elected	Republican	Michael Peifer	15,085	100.0
140	Democratic	John Galloway	Re-elected	Democratic	John Galloway	10,954	63.1
140	Democratic	John Galloway	Re-elected	Republican	Jane Burger	6,413	36.9
141	Democratic	Anthony Melio	Retired	Democratic	Tina M. Davis	8,486	50.7
141	Democratic	Anthony Melio	Retired	Republican	Kevin Glasson	8,245	49.3
142	Republican	Frank Farry	Re-elected	Republican	Frank Farry	14,081	64.2
142	Republican	Frank Farry	Re-elected	Democratic	John Toth	7,855	35.8
143	Republican	Marguerite Quinn	Re-elected	Republican	Marguerite Quinn	15,655	63.1
143	Republican	Marguerite Quinn	Re-elected	Democratic	Kathy McQuarrie	8,148	33.0
143	Republican	Marguerite Quinn	Re-elected	Independent	Tom Lingenfelter	990	4.0
144	Republican	Kathy Watson	Re-elected	Republican	Kathy Watson	18,511	100.0
145	Republican	Paul Clymer	Re-elected	Republican	Paul Clymer	14,112	65.7
145	Republican	Paul Clymer	Re-elected	Democratic	Mary A. Whitesell	6,372	29.7
145	Republican	Paul Clymer	Re-elected	Green	Charles Moyer	575	2.7
145	Republican	Paul Clymer	Re-elected	Independent	Julie M. Fagan	425	2.0
146	Republican	Tom Quigley	Re-elected	Republican	Tom Quigley	11,025	56.2
146	Republican	Tom Quigley	Re-elected	Democratic	Mark Painter	8,605	43.8
147	Republican	Marcy Toepel	Re-elected	Democratic	Robert Dodge	7,087	33.4
147	Republican	Marcy Toepel	Re-elected	Republican	Marcy Toepel	14,138	66.6
148	Democratic	Michael F. Gerber	Re-elected	Democratic	Michael F. Gerber	16,685	62.0
148	Democratic	Michael F. Gerber	Re-elected	Republican	Matt Maguire	10,227	38.0
149	Democratic	Tim Briggs	Re-elected	Democratic	Tim Briggs	14,410	62.5
149	Democratic	Tim Briggs	Re-elected	Republican	Peter M. Kohut	8,655	37.5
150	Republican	Mike Vereb	Re-elected	Republican	Mike Vereb	12,782	60.5
150	Republican	Mike Vereb	Re-elected	Democratic	Andrea Baptiste	8,343	39.5
151	Democratic	Rick Taylor	Defeated	Republican	Todd Stephens	12,288	53.1
151	Democratic	Rick Taylor	Defeated	Democratic	Rick Taylor	10,877	47.0
152	Republican	Tom Murt	Re-elected	Republican	Tom Murt	14,807	67.6
152	Republican	Tom Murt	Re-elected	Democratic	Robert H. McGuckin	7,083	32.4
153	Democratic	Josh Shapiro	Re-elected	Democratic	Josh Shapiro	17,291	70.1
153	Democratic	Josh Shapiro	Re-elected	Republican	Tom Bogar	7,382	29.9
154	Democratic	Lawrence Curry	Re-elected	Democratic	Lawrence Curry	18,945	70.6
154	Democratic	Lawrence Curry	Re-elected	Republican	Tom Bell	7,894	29.4
155	Republican	Curt Schroder	Re-elected	Republican	Curt Schroder	15,558	63.3
155	Republican	Curt Schroder	Re-elected	Democratic	Barbara Bergeron	9,020	36.7
156	Democratic	Barbara McIlvaine Smith	Defeated	Republican	Dan Truitt	11,465	50.5
156	Democratic	Barbara McIlvaine Smith	Defeated	Democratic	Barbara McIlvaine Smith	11,251	49.5
157	Democratic	Paul Drucker	Defeated	Republican	Warren Kampf	13,143	51.8
157	Democratic	Paul Drucker	Defeated	Democratic	Paul Drucker	12,240	48.2
158	Republican	L. Chris Ross	Re-elected	Republican	L. Chris Ross	15,425	63.8
158	Republican	L. Chris Ross	Re-elected	Democratic	Susan F. Rzucidlo	8,743	36.2
159	Democratic	Thaddeus Kirkland	Re-elected	Democratic	Thaddeus Kirkland	10,145	78.1
159	Democratic	Thaddeus Kirkland	Re-elected	Republican	William Rocky Brown	3,990	28.2
160	Republican	Stephen Barrar	Re-elected	Republican	Stephen Barrar	18,070	66.6
160	Republican	Stephen Barrar	Re-elected	Democratic	Nick DiGregory	7,755	28.6
160	Republican	Stephen Barrar	Re-elected	Independent	David G. Cleary	1,307	4.8
161	Democratic	Bryan Lentz	Ran for the U.S. House	Republican	Joe Hackett	13,489	53.6
161	Democratic	Bryan Lentz	Ran for the U.S. House	Democratic	Walter A. Waite, Jr.	11,696	46.4
162	Republican	Nick Miccarelli	Re-elected	Republican	Nick Miccarelli	11,624	63.6
162	Republican	Nick Miccarelli	Re-elected	Democratic	Scott MacNeil	6,642	39.4
163	Republican	Nicholas Micozzie	Re-elected	Republican	Nicholas Micozzie	11,691	57.1
163	Republican	Nicholas Micozzie	Re-elected	Democratic	Shannon P. Meehan	8,241	40.3
163	Republican	Nicholas Micozzie	Re-elected	Independent	Rodney L. Lacy	538	2.3
164	Republican	Mario Civera	Elected to county council	Democratic	Margo L. Davidson	9,971	54.6
164	Republican	Mario Civera	Elected to county council	Republican	Maureen Carey	8,309	45.5
165	Republican	Bill Adolph	Re-elected	Republican	Bill Adolph	16,693	100.0
166	Democratic	Greg Vitali	Re-elected	Democratic	Greg Vitali	14,484	58.2
166	Democratic	Greg Vitali	Re-elected	Republican	John Williamson	10,406	41.8
167	Republican	Duane Milne	Re-elected	Republican	Duane Milne	14,819	57.1
167	Republican	Duane Milne	Re-elected	Democratic	Bill Holmes	9,260	35.7
167	Republican	Duane Milne	Re-elected	Independent	P. Joseph Corrigan III	1,862	7.2
168	Republican	Tom Killion	Re-elected	Republican	Tom Killion	15,994	61.6
168	Republican	Tom Killion	Re-elected	Democratic	Gail M. Conner	9,979	38.4
169	Republican	Dennis M. O'Brien	Re-elected	Republican	Dennis M. O'Brien	12,376	100.0
170	Democratic	Brendan F. Boyle	Re-elected	Democratic	Brendan F. Boyle	10,271	63.6
170	Democratic	Brendan F. Boyle	Re-elected	Republican	Marc D. Collazzo	6,142	36.4
171	Republican	Kerry Benninghoff	Re-elected	Republican	Kerry Benninghoff	15,747	100.0
172	Republican	John Perzel	Defeated	Democratic	Kevin J. Boyle	8,998	53.9
172	Republican	John Perzel	Defeated	Republican	John Perzel	7,712	46.2
173	Democratic	Michael McGeehan	Re-elected	Democratic	Michael McGeehan	9,385	100.0
174	Democratic	John Sabatina	Re-elected	Democratic	John Sabatina	10,818	100.0
175	Democratic	Michael H. O'Brien	Re-elected	Democratic	Michael H. O'Brien	12,750	79.5
175	Democratic	Michael H. O'Brien	Re-elected	Republican	Louis S. Schwartz	3,281	20.5
176	Republican	Mario Scavello	Re-elected	Republican	Mario Scavello	14,343	'100.0
177	Republican	John J. Taylor	Re-elected	Republican	John J. Taylor	8,251	100.0
178	Republican	Scott Petri	Re-elected	Republican	Scott Petri	17,061	69.2
178	Republican	Scott Petri	Re-elected	Democratic	David Apfelbaum	7,605	30.8
179	Democratic	Tony Payton	Re-elected	Democratic	Tony Payton	9,760	90.3
179	Democratic	Tony Payton	Re-elected	Republican	Matthew F. Franchetti	1,050	9.7
180	Democratic	Angel Cruz	Re-elected	Democratic	Angel Cruz	7,241	100.0
181	Democratic	W. Curtis Thomas	Re-elected	Democratic	W. Curtis Thomas	14,307	100.0
182	Democratic	Babette Josephs	Re-elected	Democratic	Babette Josephs	17,464	100.0
183	Republican	Julie Harhart	Re-elected	Republican	Julie Harhart	14,079	80.9
183	Republican	Julie Harhart	Re-elected	Green	Rex A. D'Agostino	3,482	19.1
184	Democratic	William F. Keller	Re-elected	Democratic	William F. Keller	11,144	78.5
184	Democratic	William F. Keller	Re-elected	Republican	Stephen J. Pico	3,052	21.5
185	Democratic	Robert Donatucci	Re-elected	Democratic	Robert Donatucci	13,409	83.7
185	Democratic	Robert Donatucci	Re-elected	Republican	Michael D. Bruno	2,618	16.3
186	Democratic	Kenyatta Johnson	Re-elected	Democratic	Kenyatta Johnson	16,461	93.1
186	Democratic	Kenyatta Johnson	Re-elected	Republican	Keith Todd	1,228	6.9
187	Republican	Gary Day	Re-elected	Republican	Gary Day	14,596	70.0
187	Republican	Gary Day	Re-elected	Democratic	Richard A. Stine	6,240	30.0
188	Democratic	James R. Roebuck, Jr.	Re-elected	Democratic	James R. Roebuck, Jr.	14,999	100.0
189	Democratic	John Siptroth	Defeated	Republican	Rosemary M. Brown	9,608	54.7
189	Democratic	John Siptroth	Defeated	Democratic	John Siptroth	7,969	45.3
190	Democratic	Vanessa L. Brown	Re-elected	Democratic	Vanessa L. Brown	17,728	100.0
191	Democratic	Ronald Waters	Re-elected	Democratic	Ronald Waters	16,750	100.0
192	Democratic	Louise Bishop	Re-elected	Democratic	Louise Bishop	19,325	100.0
193	Republican	Will Tallman	Re-elected	Republican	Will Tallman	14,694	75.3
193	Republican	Will Tallman	Re-elected	Democratic	Mike Strausbaugh	4,834	24.8
194	Democratic	Kathy Manderino	Retired	Democratic	Pamela A. DeLissio	12,015	61.4
194	Democratic	Kathy Manderino	Retired	Republican	Timothy S. Downey	4,007	20.5
194	Democratic	Kathy Manderino	Retired	Green	Hugh Giordano	3,547	18.1
195	Democratic	Frank Louis Oliver	Retired	Democratic	Michelle F. Brownlee	15,108	85.8
195	Democratic	Frank Louis Oliver	Retired	Republican	W. James Kernaghan III	2,205	12.5
195	Democratic	Frank Louis Oliver	Retired	Independent	Warren Bloom	305	1.7
196	Republican	Seth Grove	Re-elected	Republican	Seth Grove	16,359	74.4
196	Republican	Seth Grove	Re-elected	Democratic	Curtis Kann	4,312	19.6
196	Republican	Seth Grove	Re-elected	Libertarian	William E. Kohler	1,305	5.9
197	Democratic	Jewell Williams	Re-elected	Democratic	Jewell Williams	'16,565	100.0
198	Democratic	Rosita Youngblood	Re-elected	Democratic	Rosita Youngblood	17,562	100.0
199	Republican	Will Gabig	Retired	Republican	Stephen Bloom	12,889	67.5
199	Republican	Will Gabig	Retired	Democratic	Fred Baldwin	6,206	32.5
200	Democratic	Cherelle Parker	Re-elected	Democratic	Cherelle Parker	22,521	100.0
201	Democratic	John L. Myers	Re-elected	Democratic	John L. Myers	18,685	97.9
201	Democratic	John L. Myers	Re-elected	Republican	Joseph L. Messa	409	2.1
202	Democratic	Mark B. Cohen	Re-elected	Democratic	Mark B. Cohen	13,587	100.0
203	Democratic	Dwight E. Evans	Re-elected	Democratic	Dwight E. Evans	18,256	98.2
203	Democratic	Dwight E. Evans	Re-elected	Libertarian	Michael C. Muhammad	336	1.8
