= Telek =

Telek may refer to:

== People ==
- András Telek (born 1970), Hungarian retired footballer
- April Telek (born 1975), Canadian actress
- George Telek (born 1959), musician and singer from Papua New Guinea
- Leona Telek (born 1931), American politician, widow of William Telek
- Ron Telek (1962–2017), Canadian First Nations sculptor
- Sara Telek (born 1988), Austrian football referee
- William Telek (1924–1988), American politician

== Other uses ==
- Telek (novella), a 1952 novella by Jack Vance
- Telek (album), 1997 debut album of George Telek
- Telek, a village in the commune of Budureasa, Romania
