= Joseph Battisto =

American politician

Joseph W. Battisto

Member of the Pennsylvania House of Representatives from the 189th district
- In office January 4, 1983 – November 30, 2000
- Preceded by: Martin P. Mullen
- Succeeded by: Kelly Lewis

Personal details
- Born: June 27, 1931 Mount Pocono, Pennsylvania, U.S.
- Died: October 25, 2014 (aged 83) East Stroudsburg, Pennsylvania, U.S.
- Party: Democratic
- Spouse: Virginia
- Children: 4
- Education: East Stroudsburg State College; University of Scranton
- Occupation: Legislator

Joseph William Battisto was a Democratic member of the Pennsylvania House of Representatives.

== Biography ==
Battisto graduated from Stroudsburg High School in 1949, earned a bachelor's degree from East Stroudsburg State College in 1956 and an M.S. degree from the University of Scranton in 1966.

He was sworn in to represent the 189th legislative district in 1983, a position he held until his defeat by Republican Kelly Lewis in the 2000 general election. In an April 2002 special election, he ran against Mario Scavello for the newly reconfigured 176th legislative district.

In 2013, the Marshalls Creek bypass was named for the former legislator, who along with former Smithfield Township Supervisor Al Wilson, came up with the idea to create it.

== Personal life ==
Joseph was born on June 27, 1931, in Mount Pocono, Pennsylvania, to Jennie (née Santasiero) and Angelo Battisto. He was the eldest of four children, and grew up with his sisters Mary Battisto Gunn and Genevieve Battisto, and brother Thomas Battisto.

In 1961, he married Virginia Marie Mayer. They had four children: Joseph William Battisto, Jr., James William Battisto, Pamela Battisto Watkins, and Jessica Battisto Dieffenbacher.

Joseph was a grandfather of eight: Rachel Watkins, Allison Watkins, Evan Battisto, Joseph Battisto III, Victoria Watkins, Brielle Battisto, Blake Battisto, and Sage Battisto.
