= Frank Lynch =

Frank or Franklin Lynch may refer to:

== People ==
- Frank J. Lynch (1922–1987), lawyer, judge and politician from Pennsylvania
- Frank Lynch (Gaelic footballer) (born 1938), Irish Gaelic games administrator, manager and player
- Frank Lynch (trade unionist) (1909–1980), British trade union leader and politician
- Budd Lynch (1917–2012), Detroit Red Wings' public address announcer
- Frank C. Lynch-Staunton (1905–1990), Lieutenant Governor of Alberta, 1979–1985
- Francis Lynch (1920–1993), also known as Frank Lynch, politician
- Frank Lynch of Keller Sisters and Lynch
- Franklin Lynch (serial killer) (born 1955), American serial killer on death row in California

== Ships ==
- SS Frank Lynch

== See also ==
- Francis Lynch (disambiguation)
