= Goebbels (surname) =

- Pronunciation: German: [ˈɡœbəls]
- Gender: Masculine
- Language: German

Origin
- Language: Middle Low German
- Origin: gobelet
- Meaning: goblet

Other names
- Variant forms: Göbbels, Goebels

Goebbels is a German surname, normally found in the western areas of Germany. It is probably derived from the Low German word gobelet. Notable people with the surname include:

- Heiner Goebbels (born 1952), German composer and music director
- Joseph Goebbels (1897–1945), Propaganda Minister of Nazi Germany
  - Magda Goebbels (1901–1945), wife of Joseph Goebbels
  - Joseph and Magda Goebbels' 6 children (murdered 1945)
- Matthias Goebbels (1836–1912), German historicist painter and priest
- Robert Goebbels (1944–2026), Luxembourgish politician and vice president of the European Left

== See also ==
- Goebbels (disambiguation)
- Ronald Goebbel (born 1936), American politician
