= Goebbels (disambiguation) =

Joseph Goebbels (1897–1945) was the Propaganda Minister of Nazi Germany.

Goebbels may also refer to:

- Goebbels (surname), other persons named Goebbels
- Goebbels Diaries, a 29-volume edition of the diaries of Joseph Goebbels
- Goebbels und Geduldig, a 2002 German war comedy film
- Goebbels Schnauze, German slang for a type of radio receiver
- Goebbels cabinet

== See also ==
- Goebel (disambiguation)
- Ronald Goebbel (born 1936), American politician
