= Pennsylvania House of Representatives, District 189 =

American legislative district

Pennsylvania's 189th State House of Representatives district
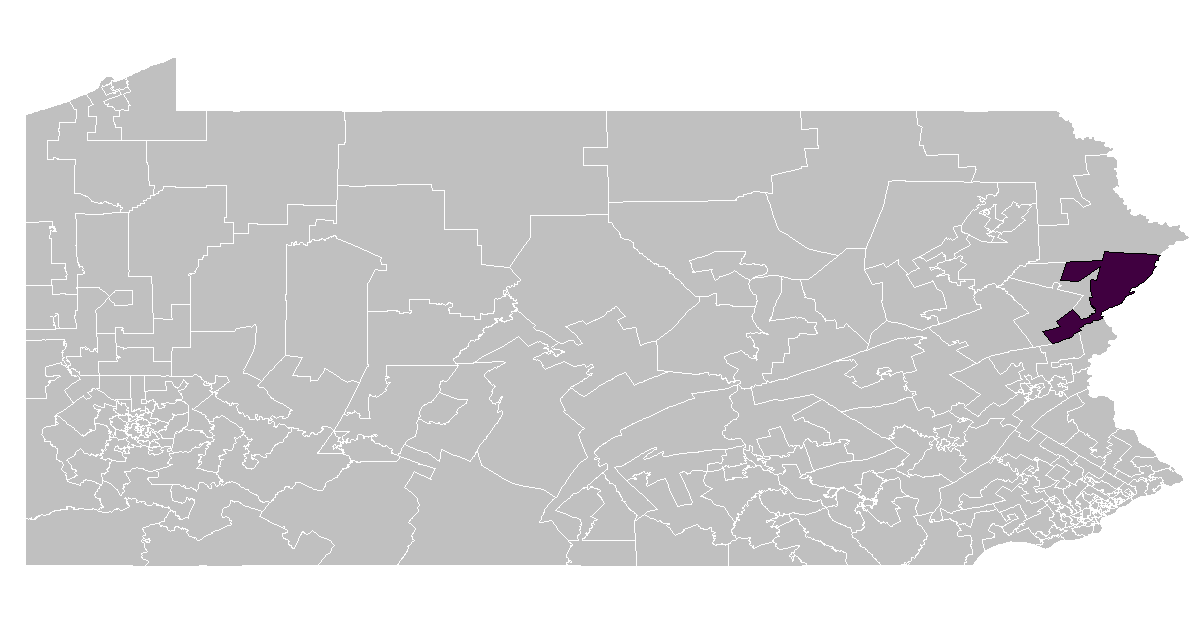
Representative
Tarah Probst; D–Stroudsburg
- Demographics: 80.7% White; 11.0% Black; 12.2% Hispanic
- Population (2011) • Citizens of voting age: 62,591; 47,559

The 189th Pennsylvania House of Representatives District is located in Northeast Pennsylvania and has been represented since 2023 by Tarah Probst.

== District profile ==
The 189th Pennsylvania House of Representatives District is located in Monroe County and Pike County and is home to the Pennsylvania Welcome Center and the Frazetta Art Museum. It also includes the following areas:

- Monroe County
  - Delaware Water Gap
  - East Stroudsburg
  - Middle Smithfield Township (PART, District East)
  - Smithfield Township
  - Stroud Township (PART, Districts 01, 03, 06, and 07)
  - Stroudsburg
- Pike County
  - Delaware Township
  - Lehman Township
  - Porter Township

== Representatives ==
Representative	Party	Years	District home	Note
Prior to 1969, seats were apportioned by county.
Martin P. Mullen	Democrat	1969 – 1982		
District moved from Philadelphia County to Monroe County after 1982
Joseph W. Battisto	Democrat	1983 – 2000		
Kelly Lewis	Republican	2001 – 2004		Resigned on December 6, 2004
John Siptroth	Democrat	2005 – 2010		Elected on February 8, 2005, to fill vacancy. Defeated in November 2010.
Rosemary M. Brown	Republican	2011 – 2023		Elected to Pennsylvania Senate, District 40 in 2022
Tarah Probst	Democrat	2023 – present		Incumbent

== Recent election results ==
PA House election, 2010: Pennsylvania House, District 189
Party	Candidate	Votes	%	±%
Republican	Rosemary Brown	9,912	54.86	
Democratic	John Siptroth	8,157	45.14	
Margin of victory		1,755	9.72	
Turnout		18,069	100.0	

PA House election, 2012: Pennsylvania House, District 189
Party	Candidate	Votes	%	±%
Republican	Rosemary Brown	14,996	55.63	▲.77
Democratic	Elizabeth Forrest	11,962	44.37	
Margin of victory		3,034	11.26	▲1.48
Turnout		26,958	100.0	

PA House election, 2014: Pennsylvania House, District 189
Party	Candidate	Votes	%	±%
Republican	Rosemary Brown	8,033	63.07	▲7.44
Democratic	Elizabeth Forrest	4,704	36.93	▼7.44
Margin of victory		3,329	26.14	▲14.88
Turnout		12,737	100.0	

PA House election, 2016: Pennsylvania House, District 189
Party	Candidate	Votes	%	±%
Republican	Rosemary Brown	16,142	63.52	▲.45
Democratic	Damary Bonilla-Rodriguez	9,272	36.48	
Margin of victory		6,870	27.04	▲.9
Turnout		25,414	100	
