= 1974 Pennsylvania gubernatorial election =

- November 5, 1974
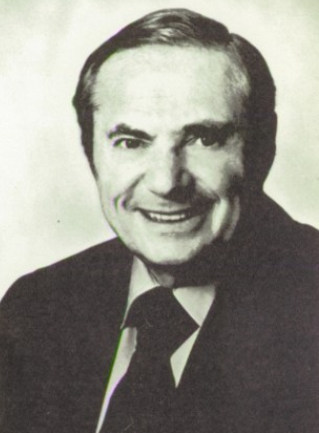

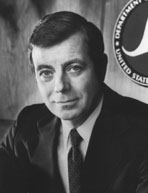
| Nominee | Milton Shapp | Drew Lewis |
| Party | Democratic | Republican |
| Running mate | Ernie Kline | Ken Lee |
| Popular vote | 1,878,252 | 1,578,917 |
| Percentage | 53.66% | 45.11% |
- County results Shapp: 40–50% 50–60% 60–70% Lewis: 40–50% 50–60% 60–70%
Governor before election
Milton Shapp
Democratic
Elected Governor
Milton Shapp
Democratic

The 1974 Pennsylvania gubernatorial election was held on November 5. Incumbent Democratic Governor Milton Shapp defeated Republican Drew Lewis. Under the state's 1968 constitution, Shapp was the first governor who was eligible to run for consecutive terms.

== Democratic primary ==
=== Candidates ===
- Harvey Johnston
- Martin P. Mullen, state representative from Philadelphia
- Milton Shapp, incumbent governor

Incumbent Governor Shapp easily dispelled a spirited challenge from Martin Mullen, a state representative from Philadelphia who was well known as a firebrand conservative opponent of abortion and pornography.

=== Results ===
Democratic primary results Shapp: 50%–60%; 60%–70%; 70%–80%; 80%–90%; Mullen: 40%–50%

1974 Democratic gubernatorial primary
| Party | Candidate | Votes | % |
|---|---|---|---|
| Democratic | Milton Shapp (incumbent) | 729,201 | 70.41 |
| Democratic | Martin Mullen | 199,613 | 19.27 |
| Democratic | Harvey Johnston | 106,474 | 10.28 |
| Total votes | | 1,035,288 | 100.00 |

== Republican primary ==
=== Candidates ===
- Alvin Jacobson
- Drew Lewis, staffing executive and Richard Schweiker campaign manager
- Leonard Strunk

With a short Republican bench, wealthy staffing executive Drew Lewis was the only serious contender in the race.

=== Results ===
Republican primary results Lewis: 50%-60%; 60%-70%; 70%-80%; 80%-90%

1974 Republican gubernatorial primary
| Party | Candidate | Votes | % |
|---|---|---|---|
| Republican | Drew Lewis | 534,637 | 76.67 |
| Republican | Alvin Jacobson | 97,072 | 13.91 |
| Republican | Leonard Strunk | 63,868 | 9.15 |
| Total votes | | 695,577 | 100.00 |

== General election ==
=== Candidates ===
- Stephen Depue (Constitutional)
  - Running mate: Ellis Werft
- Drew Lewis, staffing executive (Republican)
  - Running mate: Ken Lee, speaker of the State House of Representatives
- Roberta Scherr (Socialist Workers)
  - Running mate: Fred Stanton
- Milton Shapp, incumbent governor (Democratic)
  - Running mate: Ernie Kline, incumbent lieutenant governor

=== Campaign ===
Shapp's popularity had waned somewhat since his comfortable victory in 1970; although he could claim to have saved the state from bankruptcy, he did so at the expense of large tax increases. Furthermore, Shapp, an unabashed liberal, had difficulty rekindling support from the state's rural, socially conservative regions. However, Shapp and Democrats as a whole received a significant boost from the Watergate scandal; with President Richard Nixon's popularity in a tailspin, many of the top tier Republicans declined to run. Instead, the party turned to the wealthy businessman Lewis, who was able to project an "outsider" image. Lewis focused on local issues and greatly undercut Shapp in rural areas; despite lagging at the polls in traditional Democratic strongholds such as Pittsburgh and Scranton, Shapp preserved a moderate victory by winning the combined vote of suburban Philadelphia, an unexpected accomplishment for a Democrat at the time.

=== Results ===
Pennsylvania gubernatorial election, 1974
| Party | Candidate | Running mate | Votes | Percentage |
|---|---|---|---|---|
| Democratic | Milton Shapp (incumbent) | Ernie Kline (incumbent) | 1,878,252 | 53.66% |
| Republican | Drew Lewis | Ken Lee | 1,578,917 | 45.11% |
| Constitutional | Stephen Depue | Ellis Werft | 33,691 | 0.96% |
| Socialist Workers | Roberta Scherr^{[a]} | Fred Stanton | 8,980 | 0.26% |
| Write-ins | Write-in | | 374 | 0.01% |
| Total votes | | | 3,500,214 | 100.00% |
| Voter turnout (Voting age population) | | | | 63.31% |

== Notes ==
a. Scherr, at the time, was only 21 years old and therefore ineligible to be governor.

== Sources ==
- Roche, Kathleen M, ed. (1975). The Pennsylvania Manual. Vol. 102. Harrisburg: Pennsylvania Department of General Services.
