= Francis Lynch (disambiguation) =

Francis Lynch a.k.a. Frank Lynch or Francis J. Lynch, Democratic member of the Pennsylvania State Senate from Philadelphia.

Francis Lynch is also the name of:

- Francis Lynch, a.k.a. Sir Francis Lynch-Blosse, 9th Baronet (1801–1840) of the Lynch Baronets, in Ireland
- Frank J. Lynch a.k.a. Francis Lynch (1922–1987), Republican member of the Pennsylvania House of Representatives from Delaware County, Pennsylvania
- Francis Charles Lynch-Staunton (1905–1990), 11th Lieutenant Governor of Alberta
- a fictional military police colonel

== See also ==
- Frank Lynch (disambiguation)
- Fran Lynch (1945–2014), American football player
- Frances Lynch, historian, see Reader's Digest Condensed Books
