= Tarah Probst =

American politician

Member of the Pennsylvania House of Representatives from the 189th district
- Incumbent
- Assumed office January 3, 2023
- Preceded by: Rosemary Brown

Mayor of Stroudsburg
- In office 2015–2022
- Preceded by: Charles Baughman
- Succeeded by: Michael Moreno

Personal details
- Born: East Stroudsburg, Pennsylvania, United States
- Party: Democratic
- Education: King's College; Widener University
- Website: Official website

Tarah Dorothea Probst is a Democratic member of the Pennsylvania House of Representatives, representing the 189th District since 2023.

== Biography ==
Born in East Stroudsburg, Pennsylvania, Probst graduated from King's College with a Bachelor of Arts degree in Communications in 1992 and from Widener University's School of Law with a Juris Doctor in 2003.

From 2015 to 2022, she served as mayor of Stroudsburg; as a part-time mayor, she also worked as a regional outreach coordinator at a drug and alcohol rehabilitation facility. She previously owned a restaurant with her husband and spent many years in business marketing.

In 2018, she unsuccessfully challenged Republican incumbent Mario Scavello for Pennsylvania's 40th Senate District, receiving 42,396 votes to Scavello's 54,783.

When State Representative Rosemary Brown ran to succeed the retiring Scavello in 2022, Probst ran for Brown's seat and won with 56% of the vote, defeating Republican Steve Ertle.

Political offices
Pennsylvania House of Representatives
Preceded by Rosemary Brown	Member of the Pennsylvania House of Representatives from the 189th district 2023–present	Incumbent
