= Brian Wrightson =

American politician

Member-elect of the Pennsylvania State Senate from the 40th district
- Assuming office January 2027
- Succeeding: Rosemary Brown

Personal details
- Party: Democratic

Brian Wrightson is an American politician. A member of the Democratic Party, he is the member-elect for the 40th district of the Pennsylvania State Senate.
