= Louis Sherman =

Louis Sherman may refer to:

- Bud Sherman (Louis Ralph Sherman, 1926–2015), politician in Manitoba, Canada
- Louis Sherman (Pennsylvania politician), former Democratic member of the Pennsylvania House of Representatives
- Louis Sherman (bishop) (1886–1953), Anglican bishop in Canada
- Lou Sherman (1914-2001), politician in London, England
