= Pennsylvania House of Representatives, District 129 =

American legislative district

Pennsylvania's 129th State House of Representatives district
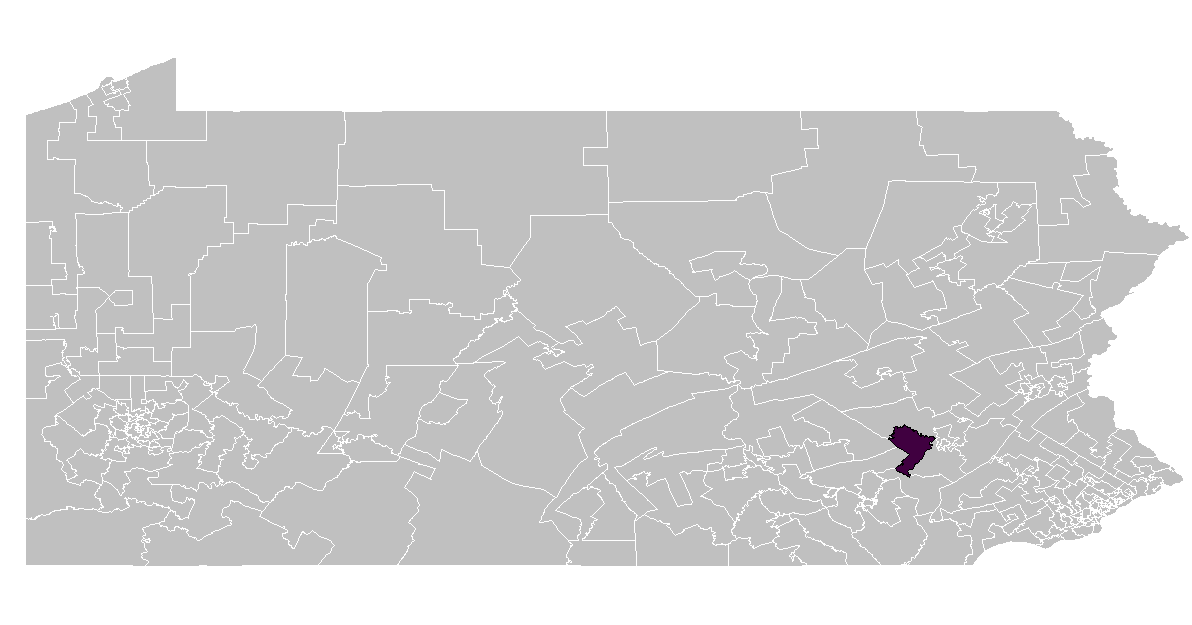
Representative
Johanny Cepeda-Freytiz; D–Reading
- Demographics: 48.1% White; 12.3% Black; 38.8% Hispanic
- Population (2020) • Citizens of voting age: 63,444; 47,862

The 129th Pennsylvania House of Representatives District is located in Southeastern Pennsylvania and has been represented since 2023 by Johanny Cepeda-Freytiz.

== District profile ==
The 129th Pennsylvania House of Representatives District is located within Berks County. It includes Penn State Berks. It is made up of the following areas

- Berks County
  - City of Reading, (PART, Wards 06, 14 [PART, Divisions 01, 04 and 05],15 and 19)
  - Wyomissing
  - West Reading
  - Sinking Spring
  - Spring Township ((PART, Districts 01, 02, 03, 04, 06, 09, 10 and 13))

== Representatives ==
Representative	Party	Years	District home	Note
Prior to 1969, seats were apportioned by county.
William G. Piper	Republican	1969 – 1974		
John S. Davies	Republican	1975 – 1992		
Sheila Miller	Republican	1993 – 2006		
Jim A. Cox	Republican	2007 – 2022	Sinking Spring	
Johanny Cepeda-Freytiz	Democrat	2023 – present	Reading, Pennsylvania	

== Recent election results ==
PA House election, 2010: Pennsylvania House, District 129
Party	Candidate	Votes	%	±%
Republican	Jim A. Cox	16,899		
Margin of victory		16,899		
Turnout		16,899	100	

PA House election, 2012: Pennsylvania House, District 129
Party	Candidate	Votes	%	±%
Republican	Jim A. Cox	17,926	59.41	
Democratic	Erik Saar	12,245	40.59	
Margin of victory				▼40.59
Turnout			100	

PA House election, 2014: Pennsylvania House, District 129
Party	Candidate	Votes	%	±%
Republican	Jim A. Cox	11,552	100	
Margin of victory		11,552		
Turnout		11,552	100	

PA House election, 2016: Pennsylvania House, District 129
Party	Candidate	Votes	%	±%
Republican	Jim A. Cox	20,268	100	
Margin of victory		20,268		
Turnout		20,268	100	
