= Gina Curry =

American politician

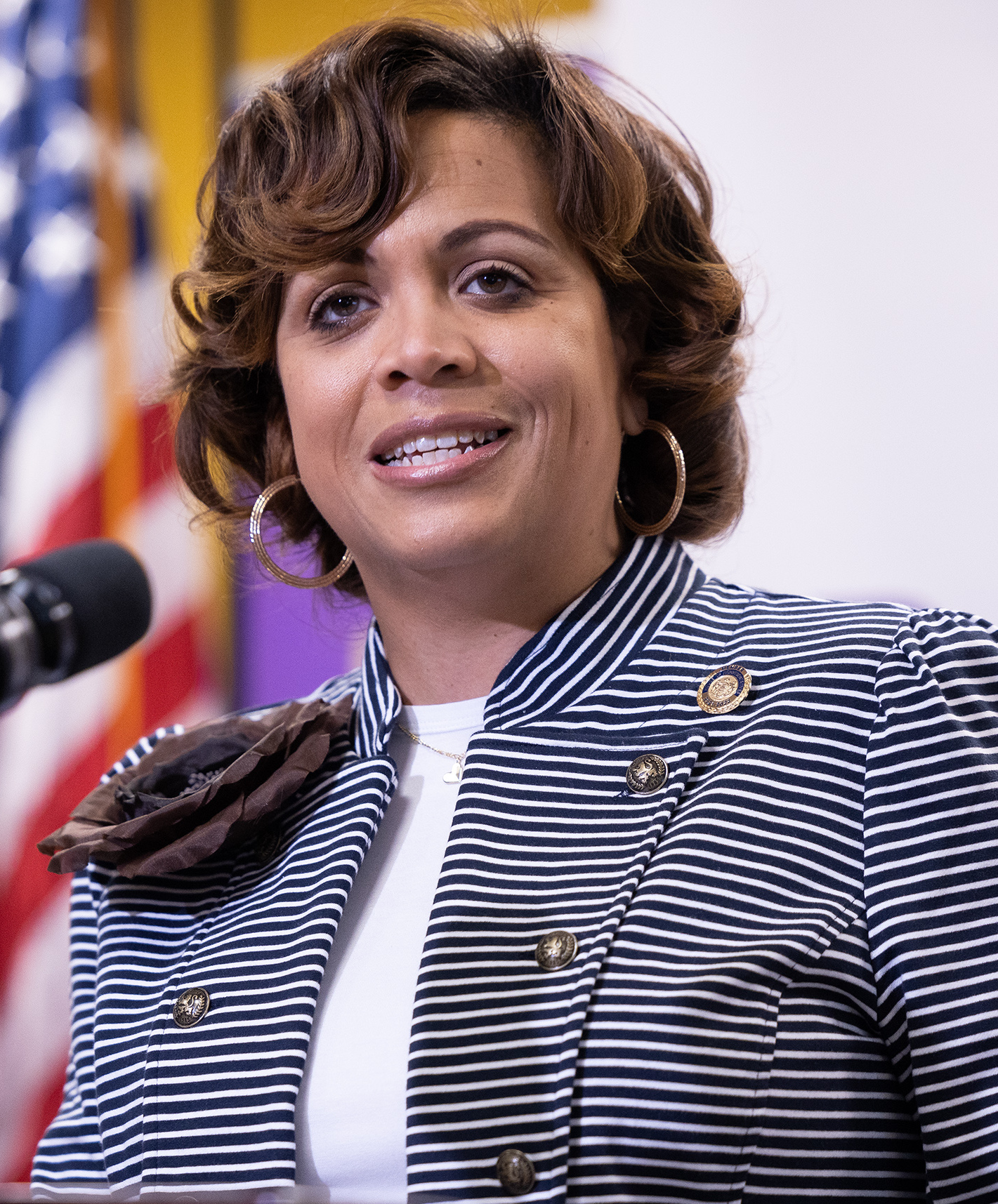
- Curry in 2022

Member of the Pennsylvania House of Representatives from the 164th district
- Incumbent
- Assumed office November 2, 2021
- Preceded by: Margo L. Davidson

Personal details
- Born: Gina Hackett Curry; October 23, 1972 (age 53) Philadelphia, Pennsylvania, U.S.
- Party: Democratic
- Education: Institute of Notre Dame; St. Joseph's University (BA, MA)
- Website: Official website

Gina Hackett Curry (born October 23, 1972) is an American politician who has represented the 164th district in the Pennsylvania House of Representatives since 2021.

== Biography ==
Born in Philadelphia, Pennsylvania on October 23, 1972, Curry received her high school diploma from the Institute of Notre Dame in 1990, and earned her Bachelor's and Master's degrees from Saint Joseph's University. Prior to her election to the Pennsylvania House of Representatives, Curry served on the Upper Darby School Board.

During her legislative career, she has served on the Pennsylvania House Appropriations Committee and its Education and Government Financial Oversight subcommittees, the Children & Youth Committee, the Education Committee and its Higher Education and Special Education subcommittees, and the Transportation Committee and its Ports and Railroads subcommittees (serving as chair of the Railroads subcommittee).

A member of the Pennsylvania Black Maternal Health Caucus, Curry and her caucus colleagues, Representatives Morgan Cephas and La'Tasha Mayes, introduced a legislative package of eight bills in March 2024 to improve and increase access to maternal healthcare statewide. Known as the "Momnibus," the package of bills proposed that Medicaid coverage be extended to cover doula services, that health insurance providers be required to provide insurance for doula services, that a Doula Advisory Board be created at the state level to set and oversee the adherence to professional standards and educational requirements for doulas, that Medicaid be expanded to cover blood pressure monitors for pregnant and postpartum enrollees and that health insurance providers also be required to cover those types of services, and that access to mental health services for pregnant or postpartum patients be increased.

Political offices
Pennsylvania House of Representatives
Preceded by Margo L. Davidson	Member of the Pennsylvania House of Representatives from the 164th district 2021–present	Incumbent
