= Rosemary Brown (American politician) =

American politician (born 1970)

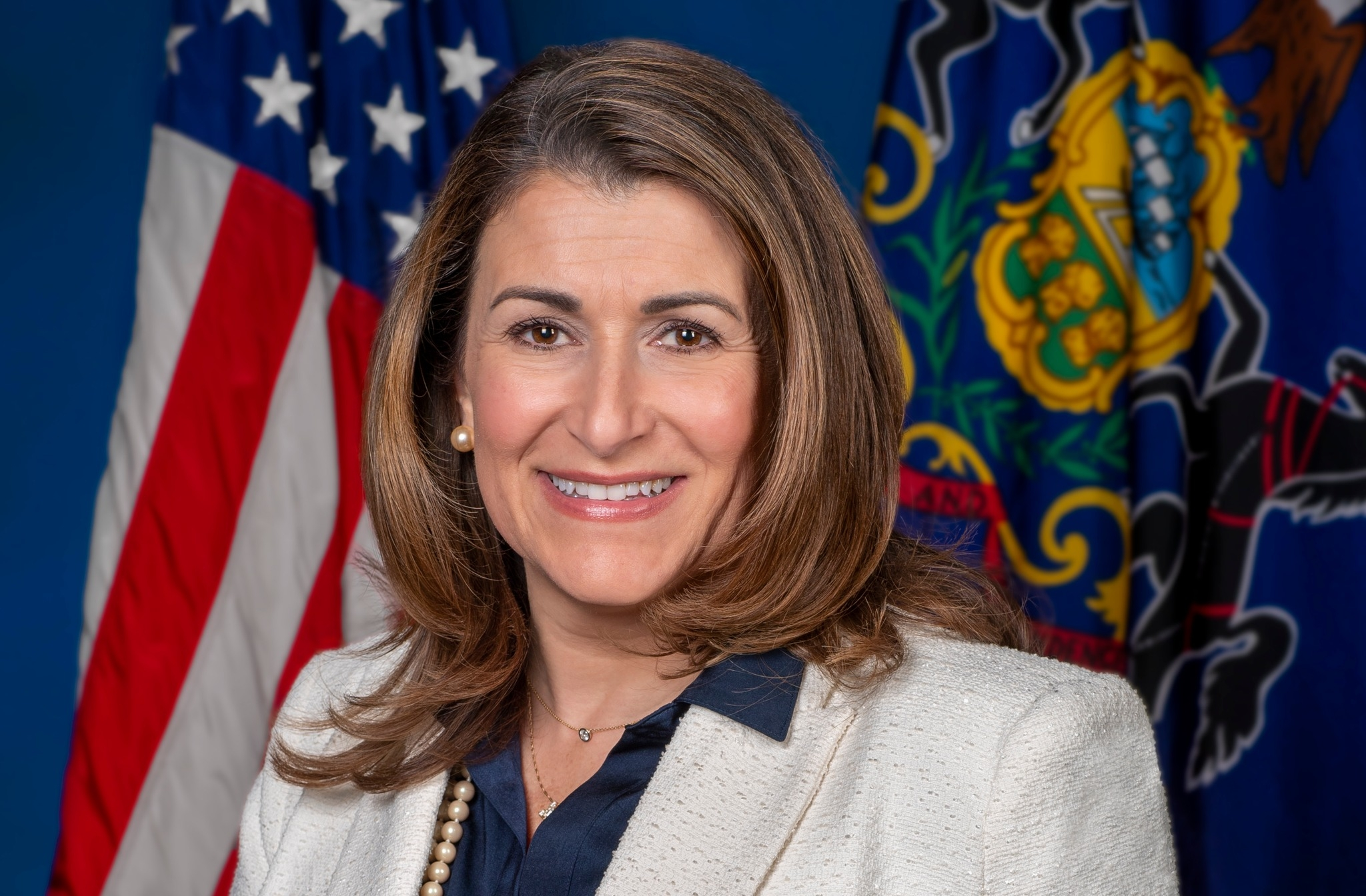

Member of the Pennsylvania Senate from the 40th district
- Incumbent
- Assumed office January 3, 2023
- Preceded by: Mario Scavello
- Succeeded by: Brian Wrightson (elect)

Member of the Pennsylvania House of Representatives from the 189th district
- In office January 4, 2011 – November 30, 2022
- Preceded by: John Siptroth
- Succeeded by: Tarah Probst

Personal details
- Born: November 20, 1970 (age 55)
- Party: Republican
- Spouse: Joe Brown
- Children: 3
- Education: University of Scranton
- Website: senatorbrown40.com

Rosemary Brown (born 1970) is an American politician. A Republican, she is a member of the Pennsylvania State Senate representing the 40th district since 2023. She previously served as a member of the Pennsylvania House of Representatives representing the 189th district from 2011-2022.

== Early life and education ==
Brown graduated from East Stroudsburg High School and holds a bachelor's degree in communications from the University of Scranton.

== Career ==
Prior to becoming a legislator, Brown worked as an assistant buyer for Macy's and as an executive sales manager for Macy’s, Saks Fifth Avenue, and The Bon-Ton stores. Brown then began working in pharmaceutical sales for Hoffmann-La Roche and Vistakon, which is a branch of Johnson & Johnson.

The 2019-20 legislative session marks her fifth term representing the people of the 189th District in the Pennsylvania House of Representatives. Brown was first elected to represent the 189th district in the Pennsylvania House of Representative in November 2010.

She served as a deputy whip for the House Republican Caucus and as a member of the House Appropriations, Education, Professional Licensure and Transportation committees.

Brown announced she would run for the Pennsylvania State Senate and not seek re-election to the House in 2022.

For the 2025-2026 Session Brown serves on the following committees in the State Senate:

- Community, Economic & Recreational Development (Chair)
- Local Government (Vice Chair)
- Appropriations
- Consumer Protection & Professional Licensure
- Judiciary
- Labor & Industry
- Transportation

== Personal life ==
Brown resides in Middle Smithfield Township with her husband, Joe, and their three children.

== Electoral history ==
2022 General Election Results for Pennsylvania State Senate District 4
Party	Candidate	Votes	%	±%
Republican	Rosemary Brown	53,795	55.3	{{{change}}}
Democratic	Jennifer Shukaitis	43,557	44.7	
Total votes		97,352	100.00	
Republican hold		Swing	{{{swing}}}	
