= Tim Brennan (politician) =

American politician (born c. 1978)

Member of the Pennsylvania House of Representatives from the 29th district
- Incumbent
- Assumed office January 3, 2023
- Preceded by: Meghan Schroeder

Personal details
- Born: c. 1978 Pennsylvania, U.S.
- Party: Democratic
- Spouse: Trish
- Children: 1
- Education: Ursinus College; Widener University School of Law
- Alma mater: Nativity BVM High School

Timothy Patrick Brennan (born c. 1978) is an American attorney and politician who has represented the 29th District in the Pennsylvania House of Representatives as a Democrat since 2023.

== Early life and education ==
Brennan is a graduate of Nativity BVM High School. He graduated from Ursinus College in 2000. He later attended Trinity University in Ireland and Charles University in Prague, Czech Republic. He became certified in law and government from Widener University School of Law in 2003.

== Political career ==
In 2015, Brennan was elected to represent the Second Ward on the Borough Council of Doylestown, Pennsylvania, where he served from 2016 until December 2022.

In 2018, Brennan unsuccessfully sought the Democratic nomination for the 143rd District seat in the Pennsylvania House of Representatives, losing to Wendy Ullman by 55 votes.

In 2022, Brennan won the election to represent the 29th District (which included much of the former 143rd), defeating the Republican and Independent candidates. He won re-election in 2024 with 55.6% of the vote.

== Electoral history ==
2015 Doylestown Borough Council election, Ward 2
Party	Candidate	Votes	%
Democratic	Tim Brennan	457	56.14
Republican	Jean Stevens	357	43.86
Total votes		814	100.00

2018 Pennsylvania House of Representatives Democratic primary election, District 143
Party	Candidate	Votes	%
Democratic	Wendy Ullman	2,723	50.51
Democratic	Tim Brennan	2,668	49.49
Total votes		5,391	100.00

2019 Doylestown Borough Council election, Ward 2
Party	Candidate	Votes	%
Democratic	Tim Brennan (incumbent)	Unopposed	
Total votes		758	100.00

2022 Pennsylvania House of Representatives election, District 29
Party	Candidate	Votes	%
Democratic	Tim Brennan	21,345	55.86
Republican	Diane Smith	15,601	40.83
Independent	Robert Ronky	1,243	3.25
Write-in		20	0.05
Total votes		30,209	100.00
Democratic gain from Republican			

2024 Pennsylvania House of Representatives election, District 29
Party	Candidate	Votes	%
Democratic	Tim Brennan (incumbent)	25,176	55.56
Republican	Steve Mekanik	19,118	42.19
Libertarian	Rob Ronky	963	2.13
Write-in		55	0.12
Total votes		45,312	100
