= William G. Piper =

American politician

Member of the Pennsylvania House of Representatives from the 129th district
- In office 1969–1974
- Preceded by: District created
- Succeeded by: John S. Davies

Member of the Pennsylvania House of Representatives from the Berks County district
- In office 1957–1968

Personal details
- Born: February 16, 1906 Philadelphia, Pennsylvania
- Died: November 30, 1976 (aged 70) Reading, Pennsylvania
- Party: Republican

William Goodman Piper (February 16, 1906 – November 30, 1976) was a Republican member of the Pennsylvania House of Representatives.
