= Harry Englehart =

American politician

Harry A. Englehart, Jr.

Member of the Pennsylvania House of Representatives from the 70th district
- In office 1969–1978
- Preceded by: District created
- Succeeded by: William Telek

Member of the Pennsylvania House of Representatives from the Cambria County district
- In office 1965–1968

Personal details
- Born: August 21, 1923 Ebensburg, Pennsylvania
- Died: May 14, 1982 (aged 58) Pittsburgh, Pennsylvania
- Party: Democratic

Harry A. Englehart, Jr. (August 21, 1923 – May 1982) was a lawyer and Democratic member of the Pennsylvania House of Representatives. He sponsored the legislation that created the Pennsylvania Lottery, and also sponsored legislation protecting miners from black lung disease. He graduated from the United States Naval Academy. He served in the United States Navy in the Pacific Front of World War II and later in the Korean War. After WWII he attended Yale Law School where he graduated in 1951. He joined his father's law firm in Cambria County, Pennsylvania where he practiced law for more than thirty years.

Englehart died suddenly in a Pittsburgh hospital in 1982.
