= Christopher Wogan =

American politician

Christopher R. Wogan

Member of the Pennsylvania House of Representatives from the 176th district
- In office 1981 – January 9, 2002
- Preceded by: Gerald J. McKelvey
- Succeeded by: Mario Scavello

Personal details
- Born: February 15, 1950 (age 76) Philadelphia, Pennsylvania
- Party: Republican
- Spouse: Susan
- Education: La Salle University; Temple University School of Law; US Army Command and General Staff College
- Occupation: Judge

Military service
- Allegiance: United States
- Branch/service: U.S. Army Reserve
- Years of service: Retired as a lieutenant colonel in the J.A.G. Corps in 2003

Christopher R. Wogan (born February 15, 1950) is a former Republican member of the Pennsylvania House of Representatives.

== Biography ==
Wogan grew up in a row house in Philadelphia with seven siblings. He graduated from Cardinal Dougherty High School in 1968. He earned a degree in political science from La Salle University (then La Salle College) in 1972 and a law degree from the Temple University Beasley School of Law in 1975. He has served as a member of the U.S. Army Reserve and worked as staff counsel for SEPTA in the 1970s.

Wogan was first elected to represent the 176th legislative district in 1980, a position he held until 2001, when he was elected judge of the Philadelphia County Court of Common Pleas. As a Republican, he was endorsed by both parties and the AFL-CIO Philadelphia Council and AFSCME District Council 33.

As of April 2026, Wogan and his wife, Susan, reside in a retirement community in Pennsylvania.
