= Edward Early =

American politician

Edward M. Early

Member of the Pennsylvania Senate from the 40th district
- In office January 3, 1975 – November 30, 1986
- Preceded by: Robert Fleming
- Succeeded by: John Regoli
- Constituency: Parts of Allegheny, Armstrong, and Westmoreland Counties

Member of the Pennsylvania House of Representatives from the 29th district
- In office January 5, 1971 – November 30, 1974
- Preceded by: Raymond Wilt
- Succeeded by: Harry Menhorn

Personal details
- Born: October 2, 1935 (age 90) Allegheny County, Pennsylvania
- Spouse: Sandy (Chestnut) Early

Edward M. Early (born October 2, 1935) is a former member of the Pennsylvania State Senate, serving from 1975 to 1986. He also served in the Pennsylvania House of Representatives.

== Life ==
Born on October 2, 1935, in Allegheny County, Pennsylvania, Edward M. Early was a son of Edward A. Early and Christina Marie (Snead) Early, and was married to Sandy Chestnut.

A Democrat, he was a member of the Pennsylvania State House of Representatives from 1971 to 1974, and then represented the 40th District of the Pennsylvania State Senate from 1975 to 1986.
