= Kelly Lewis =

American politician

Member of the Pennsylvania House of Representatives from the 189th district
- In office January 02, 2001 – December 6, 2004
- Preceded by: Joseph Battisto
- Succeeded by: John Siptroth

Personal details
- Born: May 18, 1964 (age 62) East Stroudsburg, Pennsylvania, U.S.
- Party: Republican
- Education: Bloomsburg University; Widener University School of Law
- Occupation: Legislator-Business Owner-Attorney
- Website: www.lewisstrategic.com

Kelly Lewis (born May 18, 1964) is a former Republican member of the Pennsylvania House of Representatives.

== Biography ==
He is a graduate of East Stroudsburg High School. He earned a degree in business administration and finance from Bloomsburg University and a J.D./M.B.A. from the Widener University School of Law.

He served as Monroe County Controller from 1996 through 2000, where he oversaw annual operating budgets exceeding $100 million and cost-saving measures and financial system improvements for the county.

He was elected to represent the 189th legislative district in the Pennsylvania House of Representatives in 2000, when he defeated long-term incumbent Joseph Battisto in "one of the biggest upsets in PA House history." He focused his efforts on reforming the property tax system, successfully lobbying both 2002 gubernatorial candidates to commit to addressing the issue. Lewis' bill, Act 9 of 2001, created the Education Investment Tax Credit program in Pennsylvania and helped expand access to automated external defibrillators, placing 2,400 in Pennsylvania schools and public buildings. Still among the largest AED bids ever, Pennsylvania's bids for AEDs helped lower AED prices by 50%. He resigned his seat in the legislature on December 6, 2004, to take a position as President of the Technology Council of Central Pennsylvania.

From 2005 to May 2012, Kelly Lewis was the president and CEO of TechQuest Pennsylvania, now known as the Technology Council of Pennsylvania, the trade group for the technology industry in Pennsylvania. For many years, Mr. Lewis was the host of TechQuest TV, a statewide television program featuring interviews with leaders of Pennsylvania's technology industry. In 2007, Lewis helped co-found the Pennsylvania Infrastructure Group, which led dozens of successful infrastructure initiatives.

For 26 years, Kelly Lewis was the president of Lewis Strategic, a firm providing strategic advice and government guidance to Pennsylvania companies, governments, hospitals, universities and non-profits. For many years, Lewis was the lobbyist for the Pennsylvania National Guard Associations. At the forefront of electronic medical records, Lewis was also the president and CEO of Allied Health Information Exchange Company, a health IT solutions firm.

Kelly Lewis is the author of the book, Rheingold: Born Fatima, a political thriller racing to end one of civilizations worst crimes against women. Available on Amazon Books.

Diagnosed in 2021 with Multiple Myeloma, a rare form of blood cancer with no present cure, Kelly Lewis advocates for cancer research and helping cancer survivors.

Since September 4, 2024, Kelly Lewis has been the Borough Manager of his hometown of East Stroudsburg, Pennsylvania, in the heart of the Pocono Mountains. He started Borough Beautification Days to bring the community together to improve the Best Hometown in Pennsylvania. Www.eaststroudsburgboro.org
