= Johanny Cepeda-Freytiz =

American politician

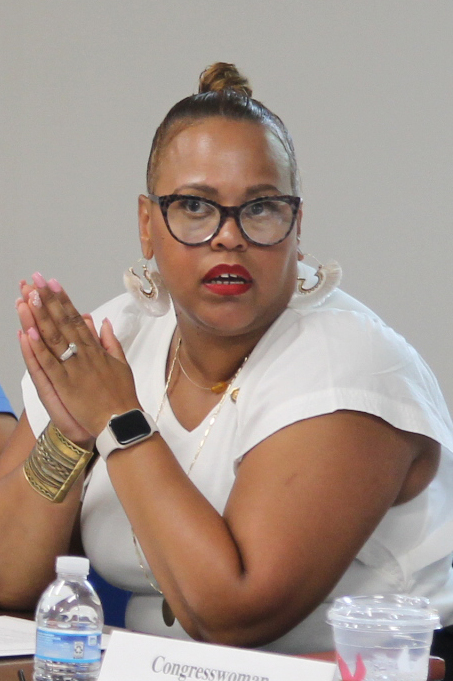

Member of the Pennsylvania House of Representatives from the 129th district
- Incumbent
- Assumed office January 3, 2023
- Preceded by: Jim Cox

Personal details
- Born: August 31, 1973 (age 53) New York City, New York, U.S.
- Party: Democratic
- Spouse: Felix Freytiz III
- Children: 2
- Education: Mother Cabrini High School State University of New York at New Paltz (BA); Long Island University (MS)
- Website: Official website

Johanny Cepeda-Freytiz (born August 31, 1973) is an American businesswoman and politician who is a Democratic member of the Pennsylvania House of Representatives for the 129th district.

== Background ==
Cepeda-Freytiz was born on August 31, 1973, in New York City to Ana and Luis Cepeda. She attended school in the Dominican Republic from ages 9 to 14, before graduating from Mother Cabrini High School. She studied French at the State University of New York at New Paltz, receiving a Bachelors of Arts. Later, she acquired a Master of Science in Education degree from Long Island University. She moved to Reading, Pennsylvania, in 2007 and opened "Mi Casa Su Casa Café" in downtown Reading, after previously living in Washington Heights, Manhattan.

== Political career ==
Prior to her election to the Pennsylvania General Assembly she served on the Reading City Council, and as its president from July 2022 until December 2022. She announced her reelection candidacy on January 25, 2024.

Cepeda currently serves on the committees below:

Agriculture & Rural Affairs

Commerce

Subcommittee on Housing Finance

Subcommittee on Local Business

Finance

Gaming Oversight

Tourism & Economic & Recreational Development

Subcommittee on Travel Promotion, History and Heritage

Political offices
Pennsylvania House of Representatives
Preceded by Jim A. Cox	Member of the Pennsylvania House of Representatives from the 129th district 2023–present	Incumbent
