= John Fichter =

American politician (1935–2014)

John W. Fichter

Member of the Pennsylvania House of Representatives from the 70th district
- In office January 5, 1993 – November 30, 2006
- Preceded by: Leona G. Telek
- Succeeded by: Jay R. Moyer

Personal details
- Born: January 2, 1935 West Conshohocken, Pennsylvania
- Died: February 11, 2014 (aged 79) East Norriton Township, Pennsylvania
- Party: Republican
- Spouse: Maryann

John W. Fichter (January 2, 1935 – February 11, 2014) was a Republican member of the Pennsylvania House of Representatives.

He was a 1952 Norristown High School graduate. He earned a degree from Ursinus College in 1975. He was first elected to represent the 70th legislative district in the Pennsylvania House of Representatives in 1992. He retired prior to the 2006 election.

He died in 2014, aged 79.
