= Sheila Miller =

American politician (born 1952)

Sheila R. Miller

Member of the Pennsylvania House of Representatives from the 129th district
- In office January 5, 1993 – November 30, 2006
- Preceded by: John S. Davies
- Succeeded by: Jim A. Cox

Personal details
- Born: May 12, 1952 (age 74)
- Party: Republican
- Spouse: Michael L. Miller
- Occupation: Farmer-Legislator

Sheila R. Miller is a former Republican member of the Pennsylvania House of Representatives.

She is a 1970 graduate of Lower Dauphin High School. She earned a degree in agriculture from the Pennsylvania State University in 1974.

From 1974 to 1979, she coordinated engineering projects for the United States Department of Agriculture in Adams, Berks, and Lackawanna Counties. She was editor of Lancaster Farming, a leading farm newspaper, from 1979 to 1983. She served the Pennsylvania Senate as executive director of the Agriculture and Rural Affairs Committee from 1983 to 1992. She was first elected to represent the 129th legislative district in the Pennsylvania House of Representatives in 1992. She retired prior to the 2006 election.

In 2007, she was hired by the Berks County Commissioners to be an agricultural coordinator for the county's farm land.

She founded two agriculture-related non-profits: Adopt an Acre Inc., a farmland preservation organization in Wernersville, Pennsylvania, and the Historic Barn and Farm Foundation of Pennsylvania, a statewide organization focused on preserving and recording historic barns.
