= Meghan Schroeder =

American politician (born 1986)

Member of the Pennsylvania House of Representatives from the 29th district
- In office January 1, 2019 – November 30, 2022
- Preceded by: Bernie O'Neill
- Succeeded by: Tim Brennan

Personal details
- Born: 1986 (age 39–40)
- Party: Republican
- Education: Millersville University

Meghan Schroeder (born 1986) is an American politician. She worked for Bernie O'Neill, and succeeded him in office as a member of the Pennsylvania House of Representatives in 2019, representing District 29.

== Education ==
Schroeder graduated from Central Bucks High School East in 2004, and completed a bachelor's degree in political science at Millersville University in 2008.

== Political career ==
Schroeder worked for Bernie O'Neill throughout his sixteen-year tenure as a member of the Pennsylvania House of Representatives. Schroeder replaced O'Neill as the Republican Party candidate for House District 29 in August 2018, after O'Neill decided to end his bid for reelection. Schroeder defeated Democratic Party candidate Andrew Dixon. She won a party primary in 2020, against Greg Archetto. In the general election, Schroeder faced Marlene Katz, the Democratic Party candidate. Schroeder defeated Katz, and won reelection by approximately 6,000 votes.

In 2022, Schroeder decided to retire from her House seat and not seek re-election.

=== Committee assignments ===
- Appropriations
- Education, Secretary
- Gaming Oversight
- Transportation, Subcommittee on Ports - Chair
