= Pennsylvania House of Representatives, District 29 =

American legislative district

Pennsylvania's 29th State House of Representatives district
Representative
Tim Brennan; D–Doylestown
- Population (2022): 65,554

The 29th Pennsylvania House of Representatives District is in southeastern Pennsylvania and has been represented by Tim Brennan since 2023.

== District profile ==
The 29th Pennsylvania House of Representatives District is located in Bucks County and includes the following areas:

- Buckingham Township
- Chalfont
- Doylestown
- Doylestown Township
- New Britain
- New Hope
- Solebury Township

== Representatives ==
Representative	Party	Years	District home	Note
Prior to 1969, seats were apportioned by county.
Raymond Wilt	Republican	1969 – 1970		
Edward M. Earley	Democrat	1971 – 1974		
Harry G. Menhorn, Jr.	Democrat	1975 – 1976		
Ronald R. Goebbel	Republican	1977 – 1980		
Lori Heiser	Republican	1981 – 1982		
David J. Mayernik	Democrat	1983 – 2002		
District moved from Westmoreland County to Bucks County after 2002
Bernie O'Neill	Republican	2003 – 2019	Warminster Township	
Meghan Schroeder	Republican	2019 – 2022	Buckingham Township	
Tim Brennan	Democrat	2023 – present	Doylestown	Incumbent

== Recent election results ==
PA House election, 2024: Pennsylvania House, District 29
Party	Candidate	Votes	%
Democratic	Tim Brennan (incumbent)	25,176	55.63
Republican	Steve Mekanik	19,118	42.24
Libertarian	Rob Ronky	963	2.13
Total votes		45,257	100.00
Democratic hold			

PA House election, 2022: Pennsylvania House, District 29
Party	Candidate	Votes	%
Democratic	Tim Brennan	21,345	55.89
Republican	Diane Smith	15,601	40.85
Independent	Rob Ronky	1,243	3.25
Total votes		38,189	100.00
Democratic gain from Republican			

PA House election, 2020: Pennsylvania House, District 29
Party	Candidate	Votes	%
Republican	Meghan Schroeder (incumbent)	23,237	55.24
Democratic	Marlene Katz	18,475	43.92
American Solidarity	Nate Schmolze	352	0.84
Total votes		42,064	100.00
Republican hold			

PA House election, 2018: Pennsylvania House, District 29
Party	Candidate	Votes	%
Republican	Meghan Schroeder	16,555	52.20
Democratic	Andrew Dixon	15,157	47.80
Total votes		31,712	100.00
Republican hold			

PA House election, 2016: Pennsylvania House, District 29
Party	Candidate	Votes	%
Republican	Bernie O'Neill (incumbent)	22,018	61.94
Democratic	Lawrence Mullins	13,529	38.06
Total votes		35,547	100.00
Republican hold			

PA House election, 2014: Pennsylvania House, District 29
Party	Candidate	Votes	%
Republican	Bernie O'Neill (incumbent)	Unopposed	
Total votes		15,863	100.00
Republican hold			

PA House election, 2012: Pennsylvania House, District 29
Party	Candidate	Votes	%
Republican	Bernie O'Neill (incumbent)	20,970	58.30
Democratic	Brian Munroe	14,998	41.70
Total votes		35,968	100.00
Republican hold			

PA House election, 2010: Pennsylvania House, District 29
Party	Candidate	Votes	%
Republican	Bernie O'Neill (incumbent)	16,837	63.59
Democratic	Frank Feinberg	9,640	36.41
Total votes		26,477	100.00
Republican hold			
