= Raymond Wilt =

American politician

Member of the Pennsylvania House of Representatives from the 29th district
- In office 1969–1970
- Preceded by: District created
- Succeeded by: Edward Earley

Member of the Pennsylvania House of Representatives from the Allegheny County district
- In office 1965–1968

Personal details
- Born: December 5, 1907
- Died: April 24, 1978 (aged 70) Pittsburgh, Pennsylvania
- Party: Republican

Raymond E. Wilt, Sr. (December 5, 1907 – April 24, 1978) was a Republican member of the Pennsylvania House of Representatives.
