= David Mayernik =

American politician (born 1952)

David J. Mayernik

Member of the Pennsylvania House of Representatives from the 29th district
- In office January 4, 1983 – November 30, 2002
- Preceded by: Lori Heiser
- Succeeded by: Bernie O'Neill

Personal details
- Born: June 15, 1952 (age 74) Pittsburgh, Pennsylvania
- Party: Democratic
- Education: Community College of Allegheny County; University of Pittsburgh; Allegheny County Police Academy; University of Pittsburgh; Widener University School of Law

David J. Mayernik (born June 15, 1952) is a former Democratic member of the Pennsylvania House of Representatives.

== Formative years ==
Born on June 15, 1952, Mayernik is a 1970 graduate of North Hills High School. He earned an Associate of Arts degree from the Allegheny Community College in 1972 and a Bachelor of Arts from the University of Pittsburgh in 1974. In 1975, he graduated from the Allegheny County Police Academy. He then earned a Master of Arts degree from the University of Pittsburgh in 1981 and a Juris Doctor from the Widener University School of Law in 1993.

== Career ==
Mayernik was first elected to represent the 29th legislative district in the Pennsylvania House of Representatives in 1982. During his legislative career, he had eleven prime sponsored bills and twenty-one amendments signed into law by four governors.

During the decennial legislative redistricting process, following the 2000 census, his district was divided into seven other districts and moved across the state from Allegheny County to Bucks County, Pennsylvania by the House Democratic Caucus in the 2002 legislative re-apportionment plan, leaving him "scant chance of re-election." Democratic leaders were unhappy that he had crossed party lines and otherwise disobeying caucus leaders. He said, "They terminated me. This was Politics 101. It sends a message: Don't step out of line. Right now, I expect to be running. I'm just not sure where I'll be running." Instead, he retired prior to the 2002 election.

In a 2002 PoliticsPA Feature story designating politicians with yearbook superlatives, he was named the "Toughest to Work For."

Mayernik has served as an adjunct professor at the University of Pittsburgh Graduate School of Public and International Affairs and as an instructor at the Allegheny County Police Academy. He is currently practicing law with the Pittsburgh law firm of Eckert Seamans.
