= Louis Sherman (Pennsylvania politician) =

American politician

Member of the Pennsylvania House of Representatives from the 176th district
- In office 1969–1972
- Preceded by: District created
- Succeeded by: Gerald J. McKelvey

Member of the Pennsylvania House of Representatives from the Philadelphia County district
- In office 1955–1968

Personal details
- Born: March 8, 1907 New York City, New York
- Died: November 2, 1984 (aged 77) Philadelphia, Pennsylvania
- Party: Democratic

Louis Sherman (March 8, 1907 – November 2, 1984) was a former Democratic member of the Pennsylvania House of Representatives.
