= Harry Menhorn =

American politician

Harry G. Menhorn, Jr.

Member of the Pennsylvania House of Representatives from the 29th district
- In office 1975–1976
- Preceded by: Edward Earley
- Succeeded by: Ronald Goebbel

Personal details
- Born: August 16, 1921 Cumberland, Maryland
- Died: March 10, 2008 (aged 86) Ross Township, Allegheny County, Pennsylvania
- Party: Democratic

Harry G. Menhorn, Jr. (August 16, 1921 – March 10, 2008) was a former Democratic member of the Pennsylvania House of Representatives. He was a Ross commissioner for 12 years and a state legislator for one year. He died of cancer on March 10, 2008.
