= Margo L. Davidson =

American politician (born 1962)

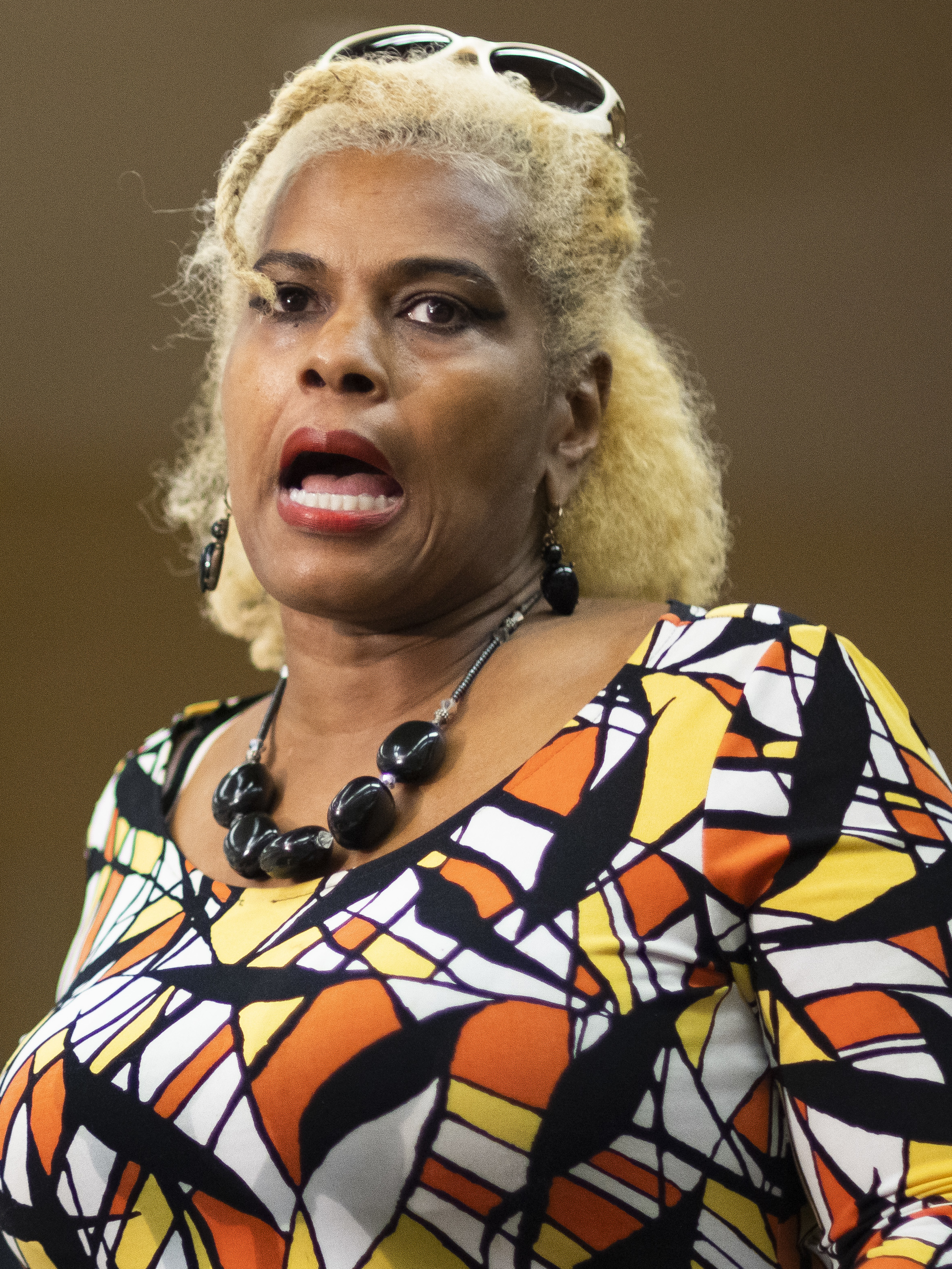

Member of the Pennsylvania House of Representatives from the 164th district
- In office January 4, 2011 – July 22, 2021
- Preceded by: Mario Civera
- Succeeded by: Gina Curry

Personal details
- Born: September 27, 1962 (age 63) Philadelphia, Pennsylvania, U.S.
- Party: Democratic
- Spouse: Robert
- Children: 4
- Education: Temple University

Margo Lomax Davidson (born September 27, 1962) is a former Democratic member of the Pennsylvania House of Representatives, representing the 164th Legislative District from 2011 until her resignation on July 22, 2021 due to criminal charges. The district included parts of Upper Darby Township, and the boroughs of East Lansdowne and Millbourne.

== Early life and education ==
The oldest of three children, Davidson was born in West Philadelphia, where she and her siblings were raised by their single mother. She graduated from the Philadelphia High School for the Creative and Performing Arts in 1980. The first in her family to graduate college, she earned a Bachelor of Arts degree in Communications from Temple University in 1988.

== Career ==
She began her career as a broadcast journalist, hosting a show on WDAS and often covering politics. She also started two non-profit organizations: the Anti-drug and Alcohol Crusaders, which offers programs for children whose parents are struggling with addiction, and the African American Female Entrepreneurs Alliance, which focuses on small business development. She worked on Barack Obama's presidential campaign during the 2008 election, traveling as far as Montana to work for the campaign.

== Pennsylvania House of Representatives ==
Davidson announced her candidacy for the Pennsylvania House of Representatives after longtime Republican incumbent Mario Civera was elected to the Delaware County Council. Civera eventually resigned his state House seat, and Davidson defeated Republican school board member Maureen Carey in the general election. She was just the third person to hold this seat but the first Democrat, first woman, and first African American to represent the 164th district.

Davidson assumed office on January 4, 2011.

=== Controversies ===
On October 28, 2016, Davidson was evicted from her campaign office in Lansdowne, Delaware County. The landlord filed suit demanding $2,796.77. He was awarded the judgement by a district judge in Upper Darby. Davidson filed a countersuit that was ultimately dismissed by the court.

Davidson was charged in 2018 for two accidents while using a taxpayer-funded vehicle. The story went national after yc.news announced charges had been filed against Davidson for crashing her taxpayer-funded vehicle while leaving a political fundraiser February 3, 2018 in Concord Township, Delaware County. After further investigation, yc.news discovered Davidson was involved in a second accident one month prior on January 11, 2018 where Pennsylvania State Police informed the media outlet that Davidson had fled the scene of the crash. Shortly after the news broke, it was picked up by Philly.com and distributed nationally. According to the Associated Press, Davidson was driving under a suspended license on all accidents involving the taxpayer-funded vehicle.

On April 10, 2018, Pennsylvania State Representative Brad Roae and State Rep. Kristin Phillips-Hill proposed legislation to rid lawmakers of all state-lease vehicles, citing the two accidents Margo Davidson was involved in that year.

=== Fraud charges and resignation ===
On July 22, 2021, Attorney General Josh Shapiro announced charges against Davidson for stealing from the Commonwealth by filing fraudulent overnight per diem requests and various other expenses through the State House Comptroller's Office as well as hindering a state prosecution. A grand jury found that Davidson had requested overnight expenses for nights she did not spend in Harrisburg, and received personal reimbursements from the Commonwealth for expenses that had been paid for by her campaign. She was also charged with Election Code violations arising from failure to report campaign finance information, as well as soliciting a witness to lie during the course of the investigation. Davidson was reimbursed by the state for out-of-pocket expenses incurred during official events and trips, despite also being reimbursed for those same expenses by her campaign.

She was charged with misdemeanor charges of Theft, Solicitation to Hinder Apprehension, and Election Code Violations. She waived her preliminary hearing, and has paid the restitution of $6,925. The case is being prosecuted by Deputy Attorney General James Price. Davidson resigned from the State House after accepting responsibility for the charges.

== 2018 Congressional bid ==
Davidson ran as a Democratic candidate for U.S. Congress in Pennsylvania's 5th congressional district during the 2018 primary, the primary and general election were won by Mary Gay Scanlon.

Democratic primary results
Party	Candidate	Votes	%
Democratic	Mary Gay Scanlon	16,804	28.4
Democratic	Ashley Lunkenheimer	9,044	15.3
Democratic	Richard Lazer	8,892	15.0
Democratic	Molly Sheehan	6,099	10.3
Democratic	Greg Vitali	5,558	9.4
Democratic	Lindy Li	4,126	7.0
Democratic	Theresa Wright	3,046	5.2
Democratic	Thaddeus Kirkland	2,327	3.9
Democratic	Margo L. Davidson	2,275	3.9
Democratic	Larry Arata	913	1.5
Total votes		59,084	100.0

== Election results ==
=== 2010 ===
PA House election, 2010: Pennsylvania House, District 164
Party	Candidate	Votes	%	±%
Democratic	Margo L. Davidson	10,083	53.65	
Republican	Maureen Carey	8,711	46.35	
Margin of victory		1,372	7.3	
Turnout		18,794	100	

=== 2012 ===
PA House election, 2012: Pennsylvania House, District 164
Party	Candidate	Votes	%	±%
Democratic	Margo L. Davidson	17,240	66.6	
Republican	Earl Toole	8,649	33.4	
Margin of victory		8,591	33.2	▲12.95
Turnout		25,889	100	

=== 2014 ===
PA House election, 2014: Pennsylvania House, District 164
Party	Candidate	Votes	%	±%
Democratic	Margo L. Davidson	12,272	80.1	
Republican	Saud Siddiqui	3,056	19.9	
Margin of victory		9,216	60.2	▲13.5
Turnout		15,328	100	

=== 2016 ===
PA House election, 2016: Pennsylvania House, District 164
Party	Candidate	Votes	%	±%
Democratic	Margo L. Davidson	20,448	79.04	
Republican	Inderjit Singh Bains	5,423	20.96	
Margin of victory		15,025	58.14	▼1.06
Turnout		25,871	100	
