= John S. Davies (Pennsylvania politician) =

American politician (1926–2010)

Member of the Pennsylvania House of Representatives from the 129th district
- In office 1975–1992
- Preceded by: William G. Piper
- Succeeded by: Sheila Miller

Personal details
- Born: September 4, 1926 Springmont, Pennsylvania
- Died: March 29, 2010 (aged 83) Reading, Pennsylvania
- Party: Republican

John S. Davies (1926–2010) was a former Republican member of the Pennsylvania House of Representatives. He was the son of John and Caroline (née Boas) Davies.
