= Pennsylvania House of Representatives, District 164 =

American legislative district

Pennsylvania's 164th State House of Representatives district
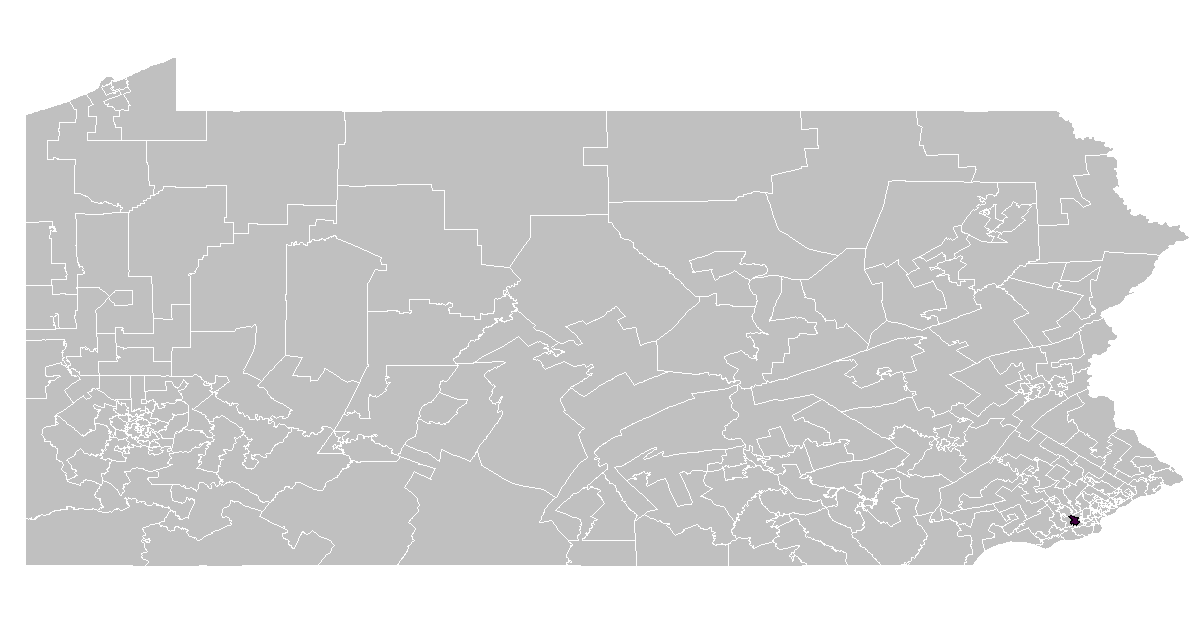
Representative
Gina Curry; D–Upper Darby Township
- Population (2021): 63,129

Pennsylvania House of Representatives District 164 includes part of Delaware County. It is currently represented by Democrat Gina Curry.

== District profile ==
The district includes the following areas:

Delaware County:

- East Lansdowne
- Lansdowne
- Millbourne
- Upper Darby Township (PART)
  - District 03 [PART, Divisions 06 and 07]
  - District 04
  - District 05 [PART, Divisions 01, 02, 03, 05, 07 and 10]
  - District 06
  - District 07

== Representatives ==
Representative	Party	Years	District home	Note
Prior to 1969, seats were apportioned by county.
Frank J. Lynch	Republican	1969 – 1980		Resigned on January 7, 1980.
Mario J. Civera, Jr.	Republican	1980 – 2011		Elected March 11, 1980 to fill vacancy
Margo L. Davidson	Democrat	2011 – 2021	Upper Darby Township	Resigned on July 22, 2021.
Gina Curry	Democrat	2021 – Present	Upper Darby Township	Incumbent

== Recent election results ==
2022 election
Party	Candidate	Votes	%
Democratic	Gina Curry (incumbent)	15,366	100.0
Total votes		15,366	100.0
Democratic hold			

2021 special election
Party	Candidate	Votes	%
Democratic	Gina Curry	6,896	79.5
Republican	Brian Taylor	1,564	18.0
Libertarian	Aniket Josan	218	2.5
Total votes		8,678	100.0
Democratic hold			

2020 election
Party	Candidate	Votes	%
Democratic	Margo L. Davidson (incumbent)	24,398	100.0
Total votes		24,398	100.0
Democratic hold			

2018 election
Party	Candidate	Votes	%
Democratic	Margo L. Davidson (incumbent)	17,785	83.0
Republican	Inderjit Bains	3,648	17.0
Total votes		21,433	100.0
Democratic hold			

2016 election
Party	Candidate	Votes	%
Democratic	Margo L. Davidson (incumbent)	20,448	79.0
Republican	Inderjit Bains	5,423	21.0
Total votes		25,871	100.0
Democratic hold			

2014 election
Party	Candidate	Votes	%
Republican	Margo L. Davidson (incumbent)	12,272	80.1
Democratic	Saudi Siddiqui	3,056	19.9
Total votes		15,328	100.0
Democratic hold			

2012 election
Party	Candidate	Votes	%
Republican	Margo L. Davidson (incumbent)	17,240	66.6
Democratic	Earl Toole	8,649	33.4
Total votes		25,889	100.0
Democratic hold			

2010 election
Party	Candidate	Votes	%
Republican	Margo L. Davidson	10,083	53.7
Democratic	Maureen Carey	8,711	46.3
Total votes		18,794	100.0
Democratic gain from Republican			
