= Lori Heiser =

American politician

Member of the Pennsylvania House of Representatives from the 29th district
- In office 1981–1982
- Preceded by: Ronald Goebbel
- Succeeded by: David Mayernik

Personal details
- Born: Loraine Mary Rams; April 20, 1928 Chicago, Illinois, United States
- Died: September 21, 2014 (aged 86) Atlanta, Georgia, U.S.
- Party: Republican
- Spouse: Richard Heiser
- Parent(s): Michael and Helen Rams
- Education: Northern Illinois University
- Occupation: state legislator, home economist, dietician, teacher

Loraine M. Heiser (April 20, 1928 – September 21, 2014) was a Republican member of the Pennsylvania House of Representatives.

During the 1970s, she played a key role in the planning and opening of a crisis center for survivors of domestic violence in Pittsburgh's North Hills neighborhood.

== Formative years ==
Born on April 20, 1928, in Chicago, Illinois as Loraine M. Rams, Lori Heiser was a daughter of Michael and Helen Rams. A graduate of Carl Schurz High School, she earned her Bachelor of Science degree from Northern Illinois University and, in 1949, became a home economics teacher in the Chicago public schools, and later worked as a hospital dietician.

== Political and government career ==
In 1975, Heiser served on a special committee formed to study the efficacy of the services offered by the North Hills School District's guidance department and recommend improvements. Findings by the committee included the need to improve the ratio of guidance counselors to students for North Hills, which had the least satisfactory ratio when compared to other school districts in the area, that guidance directors report to a director of guidance, rather than the current system of having them managed by individual building principals, that the district add more paraprofessionals to take over routine, administrative duties in order to free up guidance counselors to work with more students, and that guidance counselors do a better job of working with students not planning to attend college.

The first woman to serve as president of the Ross Township Republican Committee, Heiser co-chaired the Allegheny County Republican Leadership Training program, and was elected as an alternate delegate to the Republican National Convention in 1976.

In 1978, she chaired the gubernatorial campaign of Richard Thornburgh, and was also a candidate for the Allegheny County Home Rule Study Commission.

Elected as a Republican to the Pennsylvania House of Representatives in 1980, she represented Pennsylvania's 29th legislative district, and was appointed to the House Finance, State Government and Conservation committees. She ran an unsuccessful campaign for reelection to the House in 1982.

From 1985 through 1992, she served as a gubernatorial appointee to the Pennsylvania Securities Commission.

=== Awards and other honors ===
In 1987, the YMCA of Greater Pittsburgh presented Heiser with its Government Public Service Award for leadership.

== Community service ==
During the 1970s, Heiser played a key role in the planning and opening of a crisis center for survivors of domestic violence in Pittsburgh's North Hills neighborhood. Co-founder of the American Association of University Women's North Hills chapter and chapter president at that time, Heiser worked with members of her club and other women's organizations, including the New Century Club of Ingomar, North Area YWCA, the North Boroughs Woman's and Junior Woman's Clubs, and the Perry Highland Junior Women's Club, to create a phone and drop-in center with a playroom for children to enable women who were experiencing domestic violence to find information about legal aid and shelter services available to them. It became known as the Women's Center of Greater North Hills.

Heiser, who remained active with the AAUW for many years, was also a delegate to the Governor's Conference on Libraries, the founder of the Committee for Elderly Concerns, a member of the boards of directors of the Girl Scouts of Southwestern Pennsylvania and Regency Hall Nursing Home, and also was a volunteer for the Zoar Home.

== Death ==
Heiser died on September 21, 2014, in Atlanta, Georgia. She was eighty-six years old.
