= William Telek =

American politician

Member of the Pennsylvania House of Representatives from the 70th district
- In office 1979–1988
- Preceded by: Harry A. Englehart
- Succeeded by: Leona Telek

Personal details
- Born: January 6, 1924 Slickville, Pennsylvania, U.S.
- Died: May 17, 1988 (aged 64) Susquehanna Township, Pennsylvania, U.S.
- Party: Republican
- Spouse: Leona Telek
- Children: William; Karen(d.); Brian; Tracy; Rita; Robin; Marcia
- Education: University of Miami (B.Ed.); Pennsylvania State University (M.Ed.)
- Occupation: Educator

William Telek (January 6, 1924 – May 17, 1988) was a Republican member of the Pennsylvania House of Representatives. He joined the state House in 1979.

Telek was found beaten to death on a street in Susquehanna Township, Pennsylvania in May 1988. He had been robbed and beaten with a hammer; his car was found eight hours later being driven by Bernard Williams, who was subsequently convicted of the murder. The killer was sentenced to life in prison, and his conviction was upheld by the Pennsylvania Superior Court after an appeal.

Telek's widow, Leona, was elected in November 1988 to fill her husband's District seat.
