= Mario Scavello =

American politician

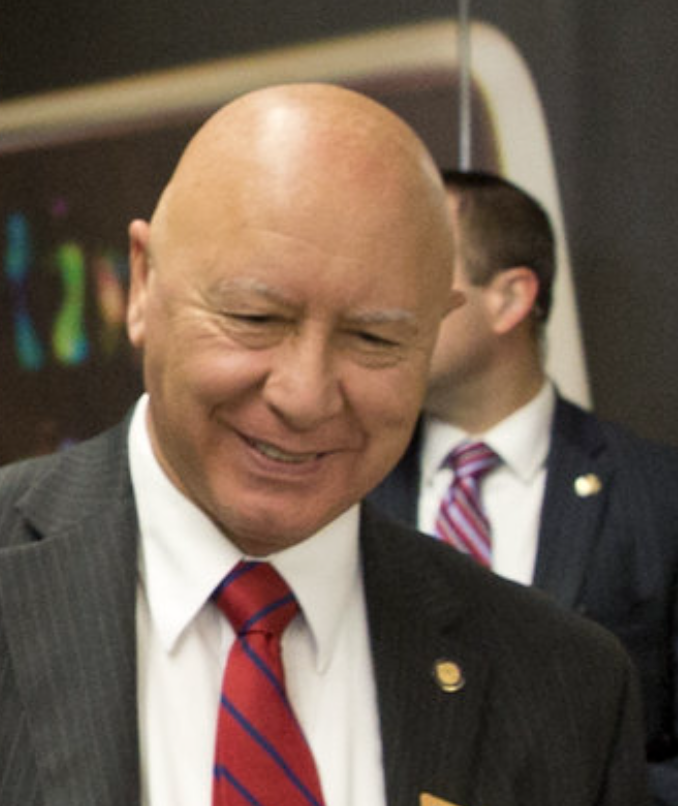
- Scavello in 2015

Member of the Pennsylvania Senate from the 40th district
- In office January 6, 2015 – November 30, 2022
- Preceded by: Randy Vulakovich
- Succeeded by: Rosemary Brown

Member of the Pennsylvania House of Representatives from the 176th district
- In office 2002–2014
- Preceded by: Christopher Wogan
- Succeeded by: Jack Rader

Personal details
- Born: May 9, 1952 (age 74) Cosenza, Italy
- Party: Republican
- Spouse: Mary Ann
- Children: Melissa, Michelle
- Occupation: Legislator
- Website: (archived - December 1, 2022)

Mario Michael Scavello (born May 9, 1952) is an American retired politician who served in the Pennsylvania State Senate from 2015 to 2022, representing the 40th district. A member of the Republican Party, Scavello previously served as a member of the Pennsylvania House of Representatives representing the 176th district.

== Career ==
Prior to his election to the State House, Scavello was the mayor of Mount Pocono, Pennsylvania and former chairman of the Monroe County Board of Commissioners.

Scavello was first elected in a special election held April 23, 2002 to replace Chris Wogan, who was elected to serve on the Philadelphia Court of Common Pleas. The combination of Wogan's resignation and statewide redistricting eliminated the Philadelphia district and triggered a special election for the new district in Monroe County. Scavello defeated a former representative, Democrat Joseph Battisto with over 60% of the vote to take the seat. He was elected to a full term in November, 2002, and served six full terms in the House until he decided to run for the newly created 40th Senate District, which was moved from Allegheny County to Monroe and Northampton counties. In the House, Scavello was a member of the House Appropriations, Ethics, Finance, Professional Licensure, and Tourism and Recreational Development Committees.

Scavello ran for and was elected to the Pennsylvania State Senate in the 2014 election, defeating Democrat Mark Aurand. On November 6, 2018, Scavello won his re-election bid against Democrat Tarah Probst. On March 16, 2022 Scavello announced he would not seek re-election due to unknown health reasons.

== Committee assignments ==
- Transportation, Vice Chair
- Aging & Youth
- Consumer Protection & Professional Licensure
- Rules & Executive Nominations
- Urban Affairs & Housing

== Personal ==
Scavello is a graduate of Theodore Roosevelt High School in the Bronx, New York and attended the City University of New York.

He lives in Mount Pocono with his wife Mary Ann, and has two grown daughters.
