= Pennsylvania House of Representatives, District 70 =

American legislative district

Pennsylvania's 70th State House of Representatives district
Representative
Matthew Bradford; D–Worcester Township
- Population (2022): 65,364

The 70th Pennsylvania House of Representatives District is located in southeast Pennsylvania and has been represented by Matthew Bradford since 2009.

== District profile ==
The 70th District is located in Montgomery County and includes the following areas:

- East Norriton Township
- Perkiomen Township
- Schwenksville
- Skippack Township
- West Norriton Township (part)
  - District 01
  - District 02
  - District 04
- Whitpain Township (part)
  - District 08
  - District 09
  - District 10
  - District 11
- Worcester Township

== Representatives ==
Representative	Party	Years	District home	Note
Prior to 1969, seats were apportioned by county.
Harry A. Englehart, Jr.	Republican	1969 – 1978		
William Telek	Republican	1979 – 1988		Died in 1988
Leona G. Telek	Republican	1989 – 1992		
District moved from Cambria County to Montgomery County in 1992.
John W. Fichter	Republican	1993 – 2006		
Jay R. Moyer	Republican	2007 – 2008	Lower Salford Township	Lost re-election
Matthew D. Bradford	Democrat	2009 – present	Worcester Township	Incumbent

== Recent election results ==
PA House election, 2024: Pennsylvania House, District 70
Party	Candidate	Votes	%
Democratic	Matthew Bradford (incumbent)	24,570	60.17
Republican	Ed Moye	16,267	39.83
Total votes		40,837	100.00
Democratic hold			

PA House election, 2022: Pennsylvania House, District 70
Party	Candidate	Votes	%
Democratic	Matthew Bradford (incumbent)	20,051	60.91
Republican	Arthur Bustard	12,870	39.09
Total votes		32,921	100.00
Democratic hold			

PA House election, 2020: Pennsylvania House, District 70
Party	Candidate	Votes	%
Democratic	Matthew Bradford (incumbent)	21,596	69.11
Republican	Daniel Wissert	9,653	30.89
Total votes		31,249	100.00
Democratic hold			

PA House election, 2018: Pennsylvania House, District 70
Party	Candidate	Votes	%
Democratic	Matthew Bradford (incumbent)	16,055	69.30
Republican	Christopher Mundiath	7,112	30.70
Total votes		23,167	100.00
Democratic hold			

PA House election, 2016: Pennsylvania House, District 70
Party	Candidate	Votes	%
Democratic	Matthew Bradford (incumbent)	18,433	66.99
Republican	Charles Springer, Jr.	9,084	33.01
Total votes		27,517	100.00
Democratic hold			
