= Martin P. Mullen =

American politician (1921–1996)

Member of the Pennsylvania House of Representatives from the 189th district
- In office 1969–1982
- Preceded by: District created
- Succeeded by: Joseph Battisto

Member of the Pennsylvania House of Representatives from the Philadelphia County district
- In office 1955–1968

Personal details
- Born: July 29, 1921 Philadelphia, Pennsylvania
- Died: February 26, 1996 (aged 74) Philadelphia, Pennsylvania
- Party: Democratic
- Spouse: Mary Mullen
- Children: John J. Mullen Esq.
- Education: University of Pennsylvania, Wharton School, Temple Law School
- Occupation: Attorney, Politician

Military service
- Allegiance: United States of America
- Branch/service: United States Army Air Corps
- Rank: Sergeant
- Battles/wars: World War II Pacific Theater

Martin P. Mullen (July 29, 1921 – February 26, 1996) was a Democratic member of the Pennsylvania House of Representatives.

== Biography ==
Born to Irish immigrants John and Nellie Mullen on July 29, 1921, Mullen grew up in Philadelphia and attended the Wharton School at the University of Pennsylvania. His education was interrupted by World War II, during which time he served in the Army Air Corps in the Pacific Theater, eventually rising to the rank of Sergeant.

After the war, he returned to Philadelphia and finished his degree at Wharton in 1948. He later attended Temple Law School and received his Juris Doctor in 1954.

Mullen served in the Pennsylvania House of Representatives from 1955 to 1982, when he left office after redistricting following the 1980 census. He was first elected to represent Philadelphia's multi-member 29th legislative district in 1954. After 1968 redistricting, he ran in the 189th legislative district winning re-election serving from 1969-1982. He was redistricted out of the 189th into the 191st legislative district in 1981, and lost to Peter Truman in 1982. During his time in office, he was one of the most vocal opponents of abortion, adultery and pornography. He unsuccessfully sponsored legislation that sought to outlaw all three, as well as fornication.

In 1974, he unsuccessfully ran for governor receiving only nineteen percent of the vote.

He served as in-house counsel for Wanamaker's department store until 1988.
