= Matthew Bradford =

American politician

Matt Bradford
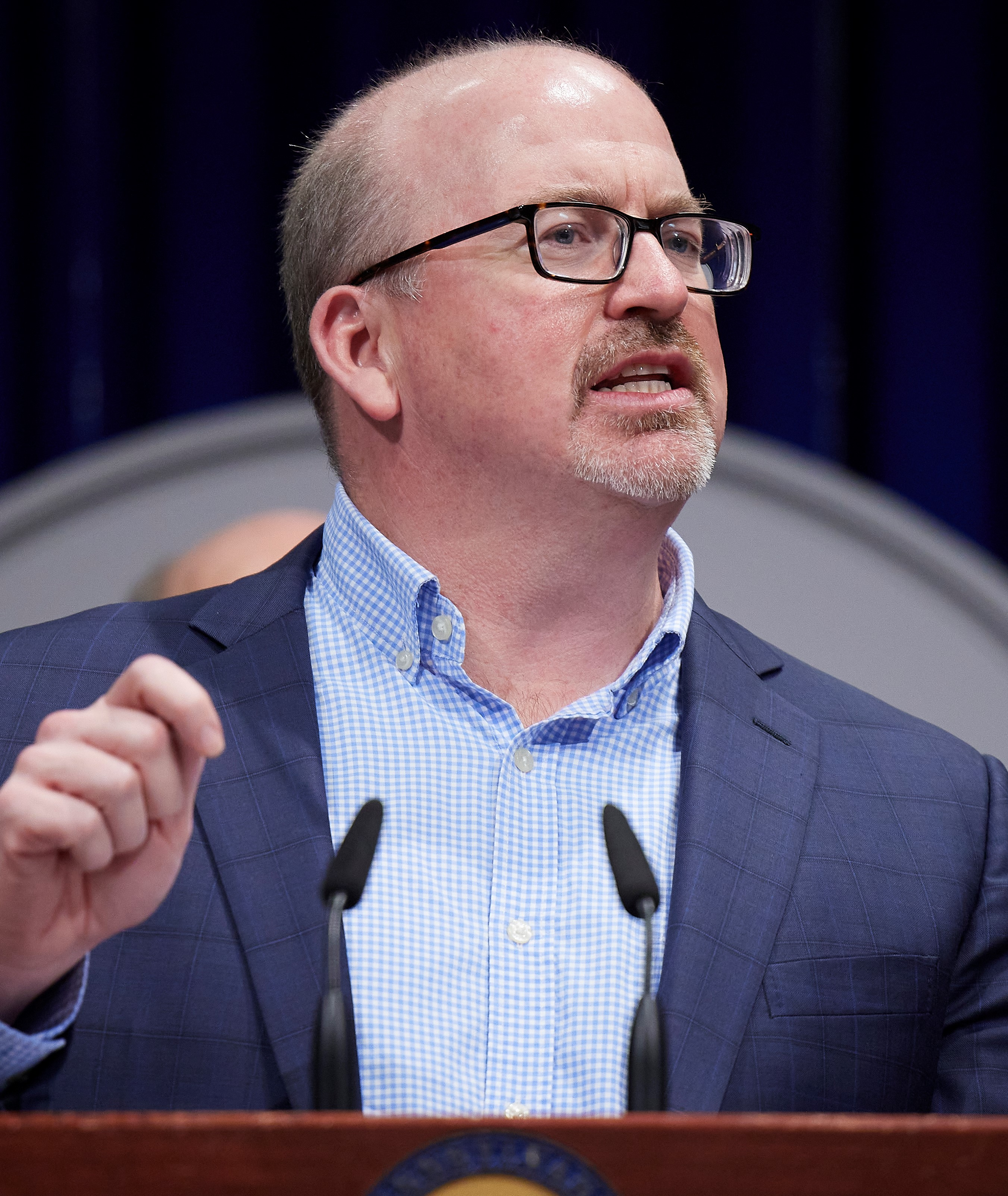

Majority Leader of the Pennsylvania House of Representatives
- Incumbent
- Assumed office February 28, 2023
- Preceded by: Joanna McClinton

Member of the Pennsylvania House of Representatives from the 70th district
- Incumbent
- Assumed office January 6, 2009
- Preceded by: Jay R. Moyer

Personal details
- Born: Matthew Douglas Bradford; May 23, 1975 (age 49); Media, Pennsylvania, U.S.
- Political party: Democratic
- Spouse: Renee
- Education: Villanova University (BA, JD)

Matthew Douglas Bradford (born May 23, 1975) is an American attorney and politician. As a Democrat, he serves as a member of the Pennsylvania House of Representatives representing the 70th district in Montgomery County.

== Early life ==
Bradford was raised in nearby Chester County, the youngest of three boys and the son of Marguerite and David Bradford. Marguerite served her country in the United States Naval Reserve. Later, Bradford's parents opened a small family business where Bradford frequently worked after school, on weekends and during the summer.

== Education and community service ==
While working to help pay for school, Bradford earned his undergraduate and law degrees from Villanova University. While an undergraduate, Bradford was active in numerous charitable organizations as well as a volunteer as a youth basketball coach for the local C.Y.O. In law school, Bradford spent the summer working for the United Steelworkers Union's General Counsel's Office, the United States Attorney's Office and a federal district court judge.

== Professional life ==
After law school, Bradford was an associate in the law firm Drinker Biddle's litigation department. Bradford took a leave from his practice when he was appointed municipal administrator and chief executive officer of Norristown Borough, serving alongside Gov. Ed Rendell's special advisor to Norristown, Joseph C. Vignola.

Bradford is Of Counsel at a municipal law firm. Bradford previously served as a solicitor for several Montgomery County communities and a school board.

== Political life ==
Bradford was first elected to the Pennsylvania House of Representatives in 2009. In addition to his prior service as chair of the House State Government Committee, Bradford served for eight years on the House Appropriations Committee and in 2018, his peers elected him to serve as chair of the committee.

On February 28, 2023, Bradford was elected as Majority Leader for the Democratic Caucus.

== Personal life ==
Matt resides in Worcester Township with his wife, Renee, and their four children.

Pennsylvania House of Representatives
Preceded by Joanna McClinton	Majority Leader of the Pennsylvania House of Representatives; 2023–present	Incumbent
