= Pennsylvania House of Representatives, District 176 =

American legislative district

Pennsylvania's 176th State House of Representatives district
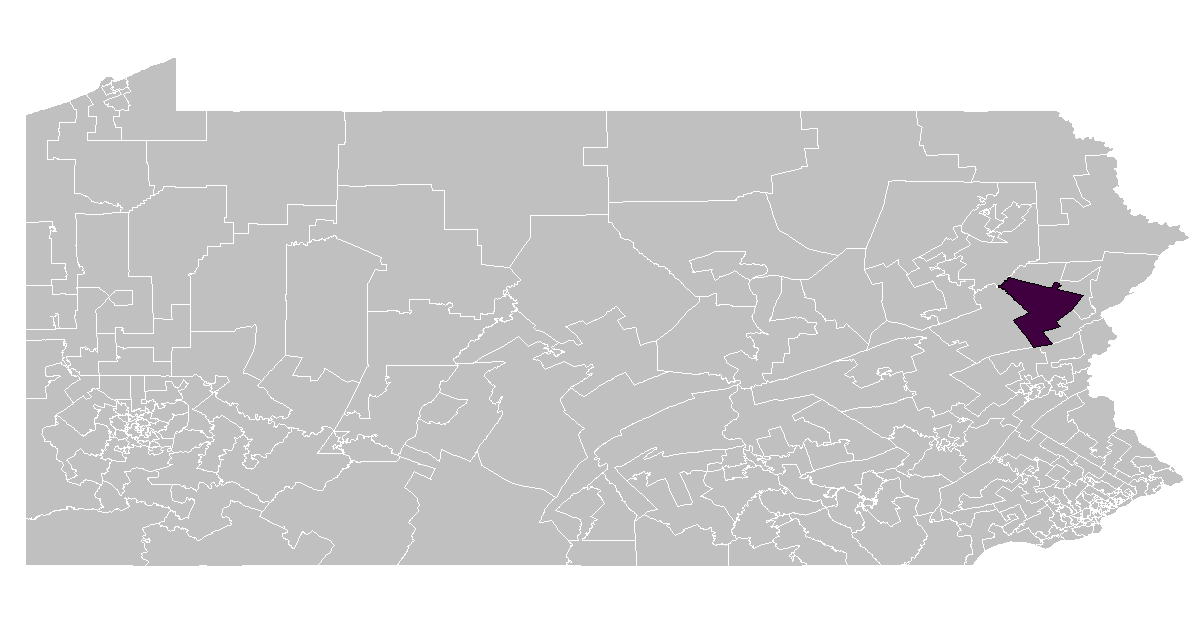
Representative
Jack Rader; R–Jackson Township

The 176th Pennsylvania House of Representatives District is located in Monroe County, Pennsylvania and includes the following areas:

- Chestnuthill Township
- Eldred Township
- Hamilton Township
- Jackson Township
- Polk Township
- Ross Township
- Tobyhanna Township
- Tunkhannock Township

== Representatives ==
Representative	Party	Years	District home	Note
Prior to 1969, seats were apportioned by county.
Louis Sherman	Democrat	1969 – 1972		
Gerald J. McKelvey	Republican	1979 – 1980		
Christopher R. Wogan	Republican	1981 – 2002	Bustleton	Resigned January 9, 2002 after election as Philadelphia City Judge.
District moved from Philadelphia County to Monroe County in 2002.
Mario M. Scavello	Republican	2002 – 2014	Mount Pocono	Elected April 23, 2002 to fill vacancy. Elected to Pennsylvania Senate, District 40 in 2014.
Jack Rader	Republican	2015 – present	Jackson Township	Incumbent
