= Bernie O'Neill (politician) =

American politician

Member of the Pennsylvania House of Representatives from the 29th district
- In office January 7, 2003 – January 1, 2019
- Preceded by: David J. Mayernik
- Succeeded by: Meghan Schroeder

Personal details
- Party: Republican
- Spouse: Linda O'Neill
- Education: Pennsylvania State University; Temple University

Bernard "Bernie" T. O'Neill is a Republican former member of the Pennsylvania House of Representatives for the 29th District from 2003 to 2019.

== Career ==
O'Neill earned degrees from Bucks County Community College, Pennsylvania State University, and Temple University.

Before entering politics, O'Neill was a special education teacher at William Tennent High School in the Centennial School District for 25 years.

O'Neill served as a township supervisor in Warminster Township, Pennsylvania from 1998 until 2003. His final three years, he served as chairman of the Board of Supervisors.

He was elected to the House in 2002 and won re-election in 2004 and 2006. O'Neill currently serves on the House Education, Judiciary, Labor Relations, and Professional Licensure Committees. He is also a member of the Governor's Commission on Higher Education and is a member of the Board of Trustees of Bucks County Community College.

== Personal ==
O’Neill is a resident of Warminster, Pennsylvania and lives with his wife and sister.

Representative O'Neill graduated from William Tennent High School, and received a bachelor's degree from Penn State University and a master's degree in education from Temple University.
