= Gerald McKelvey =

American politician

Gerald J. McKelvey

Member of the Pennsylvania House of Representatives from the 176th district
- In office 1979–1980
- Preceded by: Al Katz
- Succeeded by: Chris R. Wogan

Personal details
- Born: March 1, 1946
- Died: April 23, 2009 (aged 63)
- Party: Republican

Gerald J. McKelvey (March 1, 1946 – April 23, 2009) was a former Republican member of the Pennsylvania House of Representatives.
