= Leona Telek =

American politician

Leona G. Telek

Member of the Pennsylvania House of Representatives from the 70th district
- In office 1989–1992
- Preceded by: William Telek
- Succeeded by: John Fichter

Personal details
- Born: April 6, 1931 (age 95) Johnstown, Pennsylvania, United States
- Party: Republican
- Spouse: William Telek
- Children: William; Karen(d.); Brian; Tracy; Rita; Robin; Marcia
- Occupation: Tax collector

Leona G. Telek (born April 6, 1931) is a former American government official. A Republican, she served as a member of the Pennsylvania House of Representatives during the late 1980s and early 1990s.

== Formative years ==
Born in Johnstown, Pennsylvania on April 6, 1931, Telek graduated from East Conemaugh High School in 1949.

== Career ==
Employed early in her career as a keypunch operator for the National Radiator Company, Telek also worked as a supermarket cashier and as an assistant manager for a retail store.

A Republican, she ran for office in November 1988, seeking to fill a seat in the Pennsylvania House of Representatives that had been previously held by her late husband, William Telek, who had been murdered in May of that same year. She won and served in the House during its 1989 and 1991 terms. She was then unsuccessful in her bid for reelection to the House for its 1993 term. Elected as the tax collector for Richland Township, she served in that capacity from 2009 to 2016.
