= Jim Cox (American politician) =

American politician

Member of the Pennsylvania House of Representatives from the 129th district
- In office January 2, 2007 – November 30, 2022
- Preceded by: Sheila Miller
- Succeeded by: Johanny Cepeda-Freytiz

Personal details
- Born: October 5, 1969 (age 56) Chicago, Illinois, U.S.
- Party: Republican
- Spouse: Kelly
- Children: 5
- Education: Pensacola Christian College (B.A.); Regent University School of Law (J.D.)
- Alma mater: Marquette Manor Baptist Academy

James A. Cox, Jr. (born October 5, 1969) is an American politician. He was a Republican member of the Pennsylvania House of Representatives from the 129th District from 2007 until 2022.

== Early life and education ==
Cox was born on October 5, 1969, in Chicago, Illinois. He graduated from Marquette Manor Baptist Academy in 1987. Cox earned a Bachelor of Arts degree in pre-law from Pensacola Christian College and a Juris Doctor degree from Regent University School of Law in 1992 and 1996, respectively. Following graduation from law school, Cox worked as Government Affairs Coordinator for the Rutherford Institute. From 1998 to 2006, he served as Chief of Staff for Pennsylvania State Representative Sam Rohrer.

== Political career ==
Cox was first elected to represent the 129th District in the Pennsylvania House of Representatives in 2006. He was re-elected to seven more consecutive terms.

Cox served as chair of the House Labor and Industry Committee for the 2019–20 and the 2021-22 legislative sessions.

In 2020, Cox was among 26 Pennsylvania House Republicans who called for the reversal of Joe Biden's certification as the winner of Pennsylvania's electoral votes in the 2020 United States presidential election, citing false claims of election irregularities.

In 2022, Cox announced he would not seek re-election.

== Personal life ==
Cox has five children with his wife, Kelly.
