= Mario Civera =

American politician

Mario Civera, Jr.

Member of the Delaware County Council from the at-large district
- In office January 4, 2010 – January 8, 2018 Serving with John J. "Jack" Whelan, David J. White
- Preceded by: Linda A. Cartisano
- Succeeded by: Kevin Madden; Brian Zidek

Member of the Pennsylvania House of Representatives from the 164th district
- In office April 8, 1980 – April 30, 2010
- Preceded by: Frank Lynch
- Succeeded by: Margo Davidson

Personal details
- Born: June 19, 1946 (age 80) Philadelphia, Pennsylvania
- Party: Republican
- Spouse: Donna Civera
- Education: Temple University

Military service
- Allegiance: United States
- Branch/service: United States Air Force
- Rank: Staff Sergeant

Mario J. Civera, Jr. (born June 19, 1946) is an American politician from Pennsylvania. A Republican, he served as a member of the Pennsylvania House of Representatives for the 164th District (1980-2010) and Delaware County Council (2010-2017).

== Career ==
Prior to his election to the House, Civera served on the Upper Darby Board of Commissioners. While serving on the Upper Darby Township Council, he was also chairman of the Public Safety Committee.

On March 11, 1980, Civera won election to the House in a special election to replace Frank Lynch, who had resigned in January 1980. He has won re-election to each succeeding session of the House.

Civera did not run for reelection in 2010.

=== Dual office controversy ===
In November 2009, Civera was elected to the Delaware County Council and was sworn into office on January 4, 2010. However, controversy arose when Civera would not resign from his state House seat and thus is holding both offices. During his county council campaign, Civera said he would step down from the House, but after the election said he had no plans to leave, saying he wanted to stay in Harrisburg to complete work on a table games bill needed to finalize the 2009 budget and tie up some other loose ends. He also pointed out that he had never given a definitive date for his resignation. Democrats would like Civera to resign by March so a special election could take place in the May primary at the same time a competitive primary race for a state Senate seat is expected to drive up Democratic voter turnout, hence Civera's assertion that Democrats "want to steal the election."

I thought that Mario Civera might be helpful in [the 2010] budget process, but given his votes on table games where he voted against filling a $250 million hole in the budget, it's pretty apparent that there are other things at play rather than his desire to help the budget, so I think he should just resign, go do the job he was elected to do here locally and then let the speaker of the House, as is his legal power, set the special election.

— Governor Ed Rendell

== Personal ==
Civera lives with his wife in Delaware County. He has one son, three stepsons, and seven grandchildren.
