= Jay R. Moyer =

American politician (1947–2018)

Member of the Pennsylvania House of Representatives from the 70th district
- In office January 2, 2007 – November 24, 2008
- Preceded by: John W. Fichter
- Succeeded by: Matthew D. Bradford

Personal details
- Born: April 20, 1947 Harleysville, Pennsylvania
- Died: February 28, 2018 (aged 70) Sellersville, Pennsylvania
- Party: Republican
- Spouse: Suzette Moyer
- Education: Syracuse University

Military service
- Allegiance: United States
- Branch/service: United States Air Force
- Years of service: 1966 — 1970
- Rank: Sergeant

Jay R. Moyer (April 20, 1947 – February 28, 2018) was a Republican member of the Pennsylvania House of Representatives for the 70th legislative district. He was first elected in 2006 and was defeated in the 2008 election.

== Formative years and family ==
Moyer served in the United States Air Force from 1966 to 1970, achieving the rank of sergeant. He went on to graduate from Syracuse University and attended graduate school at Temple University. He subsequently became vice president of his family's business, Moyer Electric.

He resided in Lower Salford Township with his wife. Their daughter, Christine, is a reporter who lives in the Chicago area.

== Political career ==
Moyer served as a township supervisor in Lower Salford Township until 1989, when he was appointed as acting treasurer of Montgomery County, Pennsylvania to fill the vacancy created by the departure of Floriana Bloss, who had joined the County Board of Commissioners. Moyer was re-elected to full terms in 1991 and 1995.

After leaving the treasurer's post in 2000, Moyer went on to serve under Governor Tom Ridge as the southeast regional director of the Pennsylvania Department of Revenue and deputy secretary of the Pennsylvania Department of Environmental Protection. Prior to his election, Moyer was the regional representative for the deputy secretary of the United States Department of Education.

In 2006, Moyer ran for the House seat being vacated by retiring Rep. John Fichter. He defeated Philip Heilman in the Republican primary election and won a close 103-vote victory in the general election over Democrat Netta Young Hughes.

He was defeated for re-election in the 2008 general election.

== Death ==
Moyer died in Sellersville, Pennsylvania on February 28, 2018.
