= John Siptroth =

American politician

Member of the Pennsylvania House of Representatives from the 189th district
- In office 2005–2011
- Preceded by: Kelly Lewis
- Succeeded by: Rosemary Brown

Personal details
- Born: 1946 (age 79–80) East Stroudsburg, Pennsylvania, U.S.
- Party: Democratic
- Spouse: Elaine
- Education: Stroudsburg High School
- Occupation: Air traffic controller

John J. Siptroth (born 1946) is a Democratic politician who was a member of the Pennsylvania House of Representatives. He was first elected to represent the 189th legislative district on February 8, 2005.

== Biography ==
John Siptroth was born in the Delaware Water Gap Borough, and later attended Stroudsburg High School. He joined the Navy and served until receiving an honorable discharge in 1970.

He worked for the Federal Aviation Administration following his time in the Navy.

Siptroth and his wife Elaine have two sons and three grandchildren, currently residing in Smithfield Township.

John was a Smithfield Township Supervisor for 15 years, and Chairman for 5 years, prior to being approached to stand as a candidate for State Representative in a Special Election in 2005.

As Supervisor, John was very active in the Pennsylvania State Association of Township Supervisors and was Chair of Monroe County's Solid Waste Advisory Council.

As a US Military Veteran and sportsman, John is a strong advocate for gun rights and consistently earns the highest grades from the NRA and other 2nd amendment groups.

He endorsed Adam Rodriguez for State Representative of the 189th district for the 2018 midterm election.
