= Frank J. Lynch =

American politician

Member of the Pennsylvania House of Representatives from the 164th district
- In office January 7, 1969 – January 7, 1980
- Preceded by: District Created
- Succeeded by: Mario Civera

Member of the Pennsylvania House of Representatives from the Delaware County district
- In office January 2, 1967 – November 30, 1968

Personal details
- Born: November 6, 1922 Philadelphia, Pennsylvania
- Died: January 25, 1987 (aged 64) Drexel Hill, Pennsylvania
- Party: Republican

Frank J. Lynch (November 6, 1922 – January 25, 1987) was a lawyer, judge, and legislator from Pennsylvania.

He was a Delaware County, Pennsylvania County Councilman. He was a Republican member of the Pennsylvania House of Representatives from 1969 to 1980. He was appointed Judge of the Delaware Court of Common Pleas in 1985.
