= Ronald Goebbel =

American politician

Ronald P. Goebbel

Member of the Pennsylvania House of Representatives from the 29th district
- In office 1977–1980
- Preceded by: Harry Menhorn
- Succeeded by: Lori Heiser

Personal details
- Born: September 8, 1936 Pittsburgh, Pennsylvania
- Died: October 30, 2020 Cranberry Township, Butler County, Pennsylvania
- Party: Republican
- Children: Paul Ronald, Don Elmer, Elizabeth Innamorato, Rachel Goebel
- Education: Allegheny County Community College
- Occupation: Congressman

Ronald Paul Goebbel (born September 8, 1936) was a former Republican member of the Pennsylvania House of Representatives from Allegheny County. He was born in Pittsburgh.

His education spanned multiple institutions, including Carnegie Mellon, Art Institute of Pittsburgh, Ivy School of Art, and Allegheny County Community College.

He died following a twelve-year-battle with cancer in 2020. He passed in his sleep.
