= Pennsylvania's 40th Senate district =

American legislative district

Pennsylvania's 40th State Senate district
Senator
| Rosemary Brown; R–East Stroudsburg |
- Population (2021): 256,698

Pennsylvania State Senate District 40 includes parts of Lackawanna County and Wayne County and all of Monroe County. It is currently represented by Republican Rosemary Brown.

== District profile ==
The district includes the following areas:

Lackawanna County:

- Archbald
- Blakely
- Carbondale
- Carbondale Township
- Clifton Township
- Covington Township
- Elmhurst Township
- Fell Township
- Jefferson Township
- Jermyn
- Jessup
- Madison Township
- Mayfield
- Moscow
- Olyphant
- Roaring Brook Township
- Spring Brook Township
- Thornhurst Township
- Vandling

All of Monroe County

Wayne County:

- Canaan Township
- Cherry Ridge Township
- Dreher Township
- Honesdale
- Lake Township
- Lehigh Township
- Prompton
- Salem Township
- South Canaan Township
- Sterling Township
- Texas Township
- Waymart

== Senators ==
| Representative | Party | Years | District home | Note | Counties |
|---|---|---|---|---|---|
| Robert D. Fleming | Republican | 1951–1974 | | | Allegheny (part) |
| Edward M. Early | Democratic | 1975–1982 | | | Allegheny (part) |
| Edward M. Early | Democratic | 1983–1986 | | | Allegheny (part), Armstrong (part), Westmoreland (part) |
| John W. Regoli | Democratic | 1987–1990 | | | Allegheny (part), Armstrong (part), Westmoreland (part) |
| Melissa A. Hart | Republican | 1991–1992 | | Resigned on January 3, 2001, following election to Congress. | Allegheny (part), Armstrong (part), Westmoreland (part) |
| Melissa A. Hart | Republican | 1993–2001 | | Resigned on January 3, 2001, following election to Congress. | Allegheny (part), Butler (part), Westmoreland (part) |
| Jane Clare Orie | Republican | 2001–2012 | | Elected March 20, 2001 to fill vacancy, resigned on May 21, 2012. | Allegheny (part), Butler (part) |
| Randy Vulakovich | Republican | 2012–2014 | | Elected August 7, 2012 to fill vacancy.; Subsequently, represented the 38th district | Allegheny (part), Butler (part) |
| Mario Scavello | Republican | 2015–2023 | | Elected November 4, 2014 upon redistricting. | Monroe (part), Northampton (part) |
| Rosemary Brown | Republican | 2023–present | | | Lackawanna County (part), Wayne County (part), Monroe County |
