= 2018 Pennsylvania House of Representatives election =

- November 6, 2018

All 203 seats in the Pennsylvania House of Representatives 102 seats needed for a majority
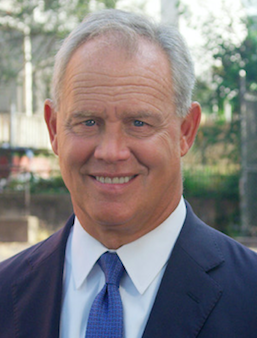

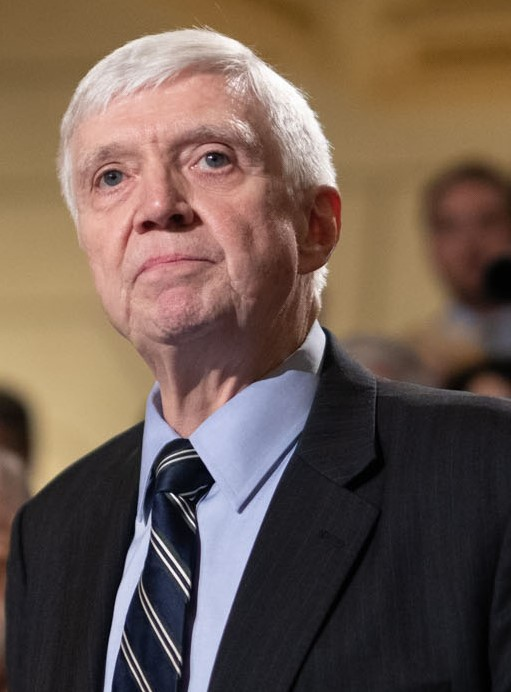
	Majority party	Minority party
Leader	Mike Turzai	Frank Dermody
Party	Republican	Democratic
Leader since	January 6, 2015	January 4, 2011
Leader's seat	28th	33rd
Seats before	121	82
Seats won	110	93
Seat change	▼11	▲11
Popular vote	2,075,093	2,568,968
Percentage	44.43%	55.00%
Swing	▼6.06%	▲6.24%
- Results: Republican hold Republican gain Democratic hold Democratic gain
Speaker before election
Mike Turzai
Republican
Elected Speaker
Mike Turzai
Republican

The 2018 elections for the Pennsylvania House of Representatives was held on November 6, 2018, with all districts being decided. The term of office for those who were elected in 2018 began when the House of Representatives convened in January 2019. Pennsylvania state representatives are elected for two-year terms, with all 203 seats up for election every two years. The election coincided with the election for governor and one-half of the state senate. The Republican Party maintained its majority in the House of Representatives, despite receiving less than 45% of the popular vote.

== Special elections ==
=== 35th legislative district ===
Democratic state representative Marc Gergely resigned his seat on November 6, 2017, after pleading guilty to charges regarding an illegal gambling machine ring. A special election for the 35th legislative district was held on January 23, 2018, to fill the seat.

Democrats selected Austin Davis, an assistant to Allegheny County executive Rich Fitzgerald, as their nominee. Republicans nominated Fawn Walker-Montgomery. Davis won the special election in the heavily Democratic district.

Pennsylvania House of Representatives, District 35 special election, 2018
Party	Candidate	Votes	%
Democratic	Austin Davis	3,209	73.97
Republican	Fawn Walker-Montgomery	1,129	26.03
Total votes		4,338	100.00
Democratic hold			

=== 48th legislative district ===
Democratic state representative Brandon Neuman was elected to be a judge on the Washington County Court of Common Pleas in 2017. A special election to fill his House seat was held on May 15, 2018, in conjunction with the 2018 primary.

Democrats nominated attorney Clark Mitchell Jr, while Republicans nominated Afghan War veteran Tim O'Neal. Both candidates also ran for their respective party's nomination for the 2018 general election. Libertarian candidate Demosthenes Agoris also ran in this special election. O'Neal won the special election, flipping a seat into GOP hands.

Pennsylvania House of Representatives, District 48 special election, 2018
Party	Candidate	Votes	%
Republican	Tim O'Neal	5,615	54.57
Democratic	Clark Mitchell Jr.	4,512	43.85
Libertarian	Demosthenes Agoris	162	1.57
Total votes		10,289	100.00
Republican gain from Democratic			

=== 68th legislative district ===
Republican state representative Matt E. Baker was appointed by President Donald Trump to serve in the U.S. Department of Health and Human Services in March 2018. A special election to fill his House seat was held on May 15, 2018, in conjunction with the 2018 primary.

Democrats nominated educator Carrie Heath, while Republicans nominated businessman Clint Owlett. Both candidates also ran for their respective party's nomination for the 2018 general election. Owlett won the special election in the heavily Republican district.

Pennsylvania House of Representatives, District 68 special election, 2018
Party	Candidate	Votes	%
Republican	Clint Owlett	7,840	75.87
Democratic	Carrie Heath	2,493	24.13
Total votes		10,333	100.00
Republican hold			

=== 178th legislative district ===
Republican state representative Scott Petri was named executive director of the Philadelphia Parking Authority in December 2017. A special election to fill his House seat was held on May 15, 2018, in conjunction with the 2018 primary.

Democrats nominated Solebury Township supervisor Helen Tai, while Republicans nominated Council Rock School District board member Wendi Thomas. Both candidates also ran for their respective party's nomination for the 2018 general election. Tai defeated Thomas, flipping a seat for the Democrats, though Thomas would go on to win the seat back from Tai in the general election.

Pennsylvania House of Representatives, District 178 special election, 2018
Party	Candidate	Votes	%
Democratic	Helen Tai	6,366	50.4
Republican	Wendi Thomas	6,265	49.6
Total votes		12,631	100.00
Democratic gain from Republican			

== Predictions ==
Source	Ranking	As of
Governing	Likely R	October 8, 2018

== Overview ==
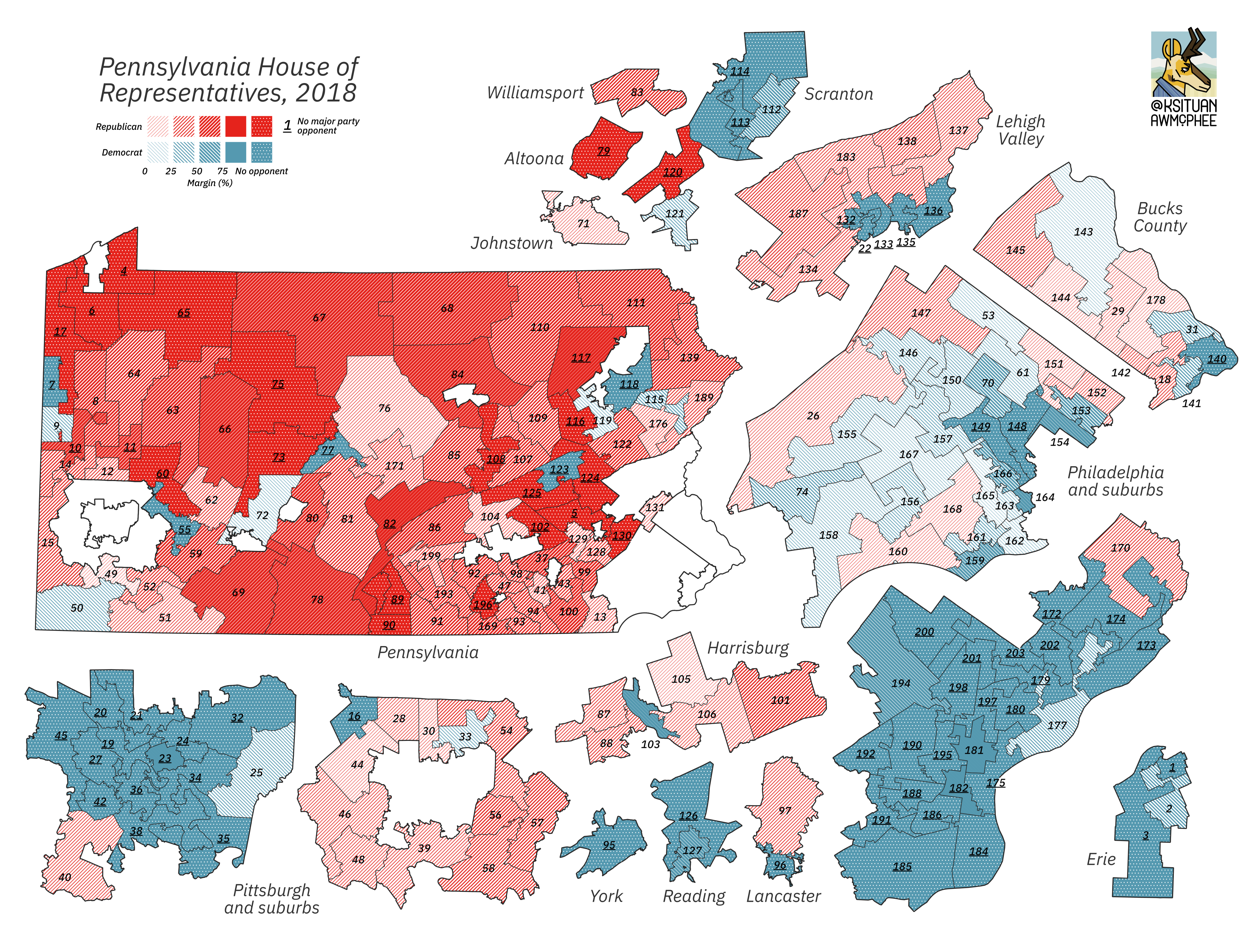
Proportional results of the 2018 Pennsylvania House of Representatives election

Affiliation	Candidates	Votes	Vote %	Seats won
Republican	144	2,075,093	44.43	110 (▼11)
Democratic	183	2,568,968	55.00	93 (▲11)
Independent	3	11,140	0.24	0
Libertarian	10	8,214	0.18	0
Green	2	6,849	0.15	0
Total	342	4,670,264	100%	203

Popular vote
Democratic	55.00%
Republican	44.43%
Other	0.57%

House seats
Republican	54.19%
Democratic	45.81%

=== Close races ===
Districts where the margin of victory was under 10%:

1. District 165, 0.5% (gain)
2. District 49, 0.56%
3. District 105, 1.64%
4. District 178, 1.66%
5. District 143, 1.68% (gain)
6. District 144, 1.94%
7. District 168, 2.34%
8. District 160, 2.94%
9. District 151, 2.98%
10. District 162, 3.1% (gain)
11. District 44, 3.68%
12. District 53, 4.21% (gain)
13. District 71, 4.28% (gain)
14. District 167, 4.3% (gain)
15. District 30, 4.54%
16. District 72, 4.84%
17. District 29, 5.4%
18. District 26, 5.58%
19. District 131, 5.64%
20. District 119, 6.12%
21. District 163, 6.84% (gain)
22. District 158, 6.88% (gain)
23. District 76, 7.44% (gain)
24. District 61, 7.52% (gain)
25. District 104, 8.96%
26. District 28, 9.1%
27. District 106, 9.16%
28. District 155, 9.3% (gain)
29. District 176, 9.48%
30. District 129, 9.95%
31. District 152, 9.98%

== Results by district ==
District	Party	Incumbent	Status	Party	Candidate	Votes	%
1	Democratic	Pat Harkins	Re-elected	Democratic	Pat Harkins	13,019	100.00
2	Democratic	Florindo Fabrizio	Died in office	Democratic	Robert E. Merski	13,736	64.90
2	Democratic	Florindo Fabrizio	Died in office	Republican	Timothy P. Kuzma	7,429	35.10
3	Democratic	Ryan Bizzarro	Re-elected	Democratic	Ryan Bizzarro	20,265	100.00
4	Republican	Curt Sonney	Re-elected	Republican	Curt Sonney	17,389	100.00
5	Republican	Barry Jozwiak	Re-elected	Republican	Barry Jozwiak	18,082	100.00
6	Republican	Brad Roae	Re-elected	Republican	Brad Roae	17,735	100.00
7	Democratic	Mark Longietti	Re-elected	Democratic	Mark Longietti	27,497	100.00
8	Republican	Tedd Nesbit	Re-elected	Republican	Tedd Nesbit	16,221	70.78
8	Republican	Tedd Nesbit	Re-elected	Democratic	Lisa K. Boeving-Learned	6,696	29.22
9	Democratic	Chris Sainato	Re-elected	Democratic	Chris Sainato	11,959	56.87
9	Democratic	Chris Sainato	Re-elected	Republican	Greg E. Michalek	9,068	43.13
10	Republican	Aaron Bernstine	Re-elected	Republican	Aaron Bernstine	16,090	78.19
10	Republican	Aaron Bernstine	Re-elected	Green	Darcelle L. Slappy	4,487	21.81
11	Republican	Brian Ellis	Re-elected	Republican	Brian Ellis	16,079	76.50
11	Republican	Brian Ellis	Re-elected	Independent	Samuel Doctor	4,939	23.50
12	Republican	Daryl Metcalfe	Re-elected	Republican	Daryl Metcalfe	18,086	58.33
12	Republican	Daryl Metcalfe	Re-elected	Democratic	Daniel Burton Smith, Jr.	12,992	41.67
13	Republican	John Lawrence	Re-elected	Republican	John Lawrence	13,796	54.50
13	Republican	John Lawrence	Re-elected	Democratic	Susannah L. Walker	11,250	44.36
13	Republican	John Lawrence	Re-elected	Libertarian	Dominic J Pirocchi	313	1.23
14	Republican	Jim Marshall	Re-elected	Republican	Jim Marshall	16,260	63.09
14	Republican	Jim Marshall	Re-elected	Democratic	Amy Fazo	9,514	36.91
15	Republican	Jim Christiana	Ran for U.S. Senate	Republican	Josh Kail	15,222	61.41
15	Republican	Jim Christiana	Ran for U.S. Senate	Democratic	Terri Mitko	9,564	38.59
16	Democratic	Rob Matzie	Re-elected	Democratic	Rob Matzie	18,528	100.00
17	Republican	Parke Wentling	Re-elected	Republican	Parke Wentling	17,434	100.00
18	Republican	Gene DiGirolamo	Re-elected	Republican	Gene DiGirolamo	12,870	56.53
18	Republican	Gene DiGirolamo	Re-elected	Democratic	James Lamb III	9,897	43.47
19	Democratic	Jake Wheatley	Re-elected	Democratic	Jake Wheatley	17,534	100.00
20	Democratic	Adam Ravenstahl	Re-elected	Democratic	Adam Ravenstahl	21,719	100.00
21	Democratic	Dom Costa	Defeated in Primary	Democratic	Sara Innamorato	19,766	100.00
22	Democratic	Peter Schweyer	Re-elected	Democratic	Peter Schweyer	9,911	100.00
23	Democratic	Dan Frankel	Re-elected	Democratic	Dan Frankel	22,414	90.58
23	Democratic	Dan Frankel	Re-elected	Green	Jay T. Walker	2,332	9.42
24	Democratic	Ed Gainey	Re-elected	Democratic	Ed Gainey	24,994	100.00
25	Democratic	Joe Markosek	Retired	Democratic	Brandon Markosek	13,963	57.60
25	Democratic	Joe Markosek	Retired	Republican	Steve Schlauch	10,278	42.40
26	Republican	Tim Hennessey	Re-elected	Republican	Tim Hennessey	14,290	52.79
26	Republican	Tim Hennessey	Re-elected	Democratic	Pamela Hacker	12,778	47.21
27	Democratic	Dan Deasy	Re-elected	Democratic	Dan Deasy	19,413	100.00
28	Republican	Mike Turzai	Re-elected	Republican	Mike Turzai	17,902	54.55
28	Republican	Mike Turzai	Re-elected	Democratic	Emily Skopov	14,915	45.45
29	Republican	Bernie O'Neill	Retired	Republican	Meghan Schroeder	16,555	52.20
29	Republican	Bernie O'Neill	Retired	Democratic	Andrew Dixon	15,157	47.80
30	Republican	Hal English	Retired	Republican	Lori Mizgorski	17,172	52.27
30	Republican	Hal English	Retired	Democratic	Elizabeth Monroe	15,682	47.73
31	Democratic	Perry Warren	Re-elected	Democratic	Perry Warren	20,583	59.96
31	Democratic	Perry Warren	Re-elected	Republican	Ryan W Gallagher	13,745	40.04
32	Democratic	Tony DeLuca	Re-elected	Democratic	Tony DeLuca	22,726	100.00
33	Democratic	Frank Dermody	Re-elected	Democratic	Frank Dermody	12,907	55.64
33	Democratic	Frank Dermody	Re-elected	Republican	Joshua Nulph	10,292	44.36
34	Democratic	Paul Costa	Defeated in Primary	Democratic	Summer Lee	21,123	100.00
35	Democratic	Austin Davis	Re-elected	Democratic	Austin Davis	15,080	100.00
36	Democratic	Harry Readshaw	Re-elected	Democratic	Harry Readshaw	19,089	100.00
37	Republican	Mindy Fee	Re-elected	Republican	Mindy Fee	18,510	72.66
37	Republican	Mindy Fee	Re-elected	Democratic	Suzanne Delahunt	6,964	27.34
38	Democratic	Bill Kortz	Re-elected	Democratic	Bill Kortz	19,975	100.00
39	Republican	Rick Saccone	Ran for Congress	Republican	Mike Puskaric	14,751	55.88
39	Republican	Rick Saccone	Ran for Congress	Democratic	Rob Rhoderick	11,645	44.12
40	Republican	John Maher	Retired	Republican	Natalie Mihalek	18,271	56.02
40	Republican	John Maher	Retired	Democratic	Sharon Guidi	14,343	43.98
41	Republican	Brett Miller	Re-elected	Republican	Brett Miller	16,951	56.27
41	Republican	Brett Miller	Re-elected	Democratic	Michele Wherley	13,173	43.73
42	Democratic	Dan Miller	Re-elected	Democratic	Dan Miller	23,837	100.00
43	Republican	Keith Greiner	Re-elected	Republican	Keith Greiner	15,692	62.42
43	Republican	Keith Greiner	Re-elected	Democratic	Jennie Porter	9,448	37.58
44	Republican	Mark Mustio	Retired	Republican	Valerie Gaydos	15,094	51.84
44	Republican	Mark Mustio	Retired	Democratic	Michele Knoll	14,023	48.16
45	Democratic	Anita Astorino Kulik	Re-elected	Democratic	Anita Astorino Kulik	20,781	100.00
46	Republican	Jason Ortitay	Re-elected	Republican	Jason Ortitay	15,505	55.67
46	Republican	Jason Ortitay	Re-elected	Democratic	Byron Timmins	12,345	44.33
47	Republican	Keith Gillespie	Re-elected	Republican	Keith Gillespie	16,286	64.30
47	Republican	Keith Gillespie	Re-elected	Democratic	Michael Wascovich	9,044	35.70
48	Republican	Tim O'Neal	Re-elected	Republican	Tim O'Neal	12,993	55.75
48	Republican	Tim O'Neal	Re-elected	Democratic	Clark Mitchell Jr.	10,313	44.25
49	Republican	Donald Cook	Re-elected	Republican	Donald Cook	9,750	50.28
49	Republican	Donald Cook	Re-elected	Democratic	Steve Toprani	9,642	49.72
50	Democratic	Pam Snyder	Re-elected	Democratic	Pam Snyder	10,532	56.61
50	Democratic	Pam Snyder	Re-elected	Republican	Elizabeth L. Rohanna McClure	8,072	43.39
51	Republican	Matt Dowling	Re-elected	Republican	Matt Dowling	10,773	55.47
51	Republican	Matt Dowling	Re-elected	Democratic	Tim Mahoney	8,650	44.53
52	Republican	Ryan Warner	Re-elected	Republican	Ryan Warner	12,251	61.17
52	Republican	Ryan Warner	Re-elected	Democratic	Ethan Keedy	7,776	38.83
53	Republican	Bob Godshall	Retired	Democratic	Steve Malagari	13,632	51.06
53	Republican	Bob Godshall	Retired	Republican	George Szekely II	12,775	47.85
53	Republican	Bob Godshall	Retired	Libertarian	John Waldenberger	290	1.09
54	Republican	Eli Evankovich	Announced retirement, then resigned	Republican	Robert Brooks	16,276	59.85
54	Republican	Eli Evankovich	Announced retirement, then resigned	Democratic	Jonathan McCabe	10,918	40.15
55	Democratic	Joe Petrarca	Re-elected	Democratic	Joe Petrarca	14,567	100.00
56	Republican	George Dunbar	Re-elected	Republican	George Dunbar	17,597	62.99
56	Republican	George Dunbar	Re-elected	Democratic	Douglas Hunt	10,341	37.01
57	Republican	Eric Nelson	Re-elected	Republican	Eric Nelson	16,043	62.83
57	Republican	Eric Nelson	Re-elected	Democratic	Collin Warren	9,491	37.17
58	Republican	Justin Walsh	Re-elected	Republican	Justin Walsh	14,172	61.74
58	Republican	Justin Walsh	Re-elected	Democratic	Mary E. Popovich	8,782	38.26
59	Republican	Mike Reese	Re-elected	Republican	Mike Reese	18,481	70.34
59	Republican	Mike Reese	Re-elected	Democratic	Clare Dooley	7,794	29.66
60	Republican	Jeff Pyle	Re-elected	Republican	Jeff Pyle	19,079	100.00
61	Republican	Kate Harper	Defeated	Democratic	Liz Hanbidge	17,689	53.76
61	Republican	Kate Harper	Defeated	Republican	Kate Harper	15,214	46.24
62	Republican	Dave Reed	Retired	Republican	James Struzzi	12,321	58.18
62	Republican	Dave Reed	Retired	Democratic	Logan Dellafiora	8,858	41.82
63	Republican	Donna Oberlander	Re-elected	Republican	Donna Oberlander	15,163	73.08
63	Republican	Donna Oberlander	Re-elected	Democratic	Conrad Warner	5,585	26.92
64	Republican	Lee James	Re-elected	Republican	Lee James	13,839	67.54
64	Republican	Lee James	Re-elected	Democratic	John Kluck	6,652	32.46
65	Republican	Kathy Rapp	Re-elected	Republican	Kathy Rapp	16,259	100.00
66	Republican	Cris Dush	Re-elected	Republican	Cris Dush	17,007	79.56
66	Republican	Cris Dush	Re-elected	Democratic	Kerith Strano Taylor	4,369	20.44
67	Republican	Martin Causer	Re-elected	Republican	Martin Causer	15,823	78.75
67	Republican	Martin Causer	Re-elected	Democratic	Maryanne Cole	4,270	21.25
68	Republican	Clint Owlett	Re-elected	Republican	Clint Owlett	16,109	76.92
68	Republican	Clint Owlett	Re-elected	Democratic	Carrie Heath	4,834	16,109
69	Republican	Carl Walker Metzgar	Re-elected	Republican	Carl Walker Metzgar	19,028	'79.16
69	Republican	Carl Walker Metzgar	Re-elected	Democratic	Jeff Cole	5,008	20.84
70	Democratic	Matt Bradford	Re-elected	Democratic	Matt Bradford	16,055	69.30
70	Democratic	Matt Bradford	Re-elected	Republican	Christopher Mundiath	7,112	30.70
71	Democratic	Bryan Barbin	Defeated	Republican	James Rigby	11,615	52.14
71	Democratic	Bryan Barbin	Defeated	Democratic	Bryan Barbin	10,661	47.86
72	Democratic	Frank Burns	Re-elected	Democratic	Frank Burns	11,819	52.42
72	Democratic	Frank Burns	Re-elected	Republican	Gerald Carnicella	10,726	47.58
73	Republican	Tommy Sankey	Re-elected	Republican	Tommy Sankey	19,607	100.00
74	Republican	Harry Lewis	Retired	Democratic	Dan Williams	14,826	61.47
74	Republican	Harry Lewis	Retired	Republican	Amber Turner	9,294	38.53
75	Republican	Matt Gabler	Re-elected	Republican	Matt Gabler	21,725	100.00
76	Democratic	Mike Hanna Sr.	Retired	Republican	Stephanie Borowicz	11,224	53.72
76	Democratic	Mike Hanna Sr.	Retired	Democratic	Mike Hanna Jr.	9,669	46.28
77	Democratic	Scott Conklin	Re-elected	Democratic	Scott Conklin	14,996	100.00
78	Republican	Jesse Topper	Re-elected	Republican	Jesse Topper	18,937	79.21
78	Republican	Jesse Topper	Re-elected	Democratic	Deborah Baughman	4,971	20.79
79	Republican	John McGinnis	Retired	Republican	Louis Schmitt Jr.	15.106	100.00
80	Republican	Judy Ward	Retired	Republican	James V. Gregory	17,889	74.37
80	Republican	Judy Ward	Retired	Democratic	Laura Burke	6,164	25.63
81	Republican	Rich Irvin	Re-elected	Republican	Rich Irvin	15,579	62.52
81	Republican	Rich Irvin	Re-elected	Democratic	Richard J. Rogers Sr.	8,619	34.59
81	Republican	Rich Irvin	Re-elected	Libertarian	Joseph Soloski	721	2.89
82	Republican	Adam Harris	Retired	Republican	John D. Hershey	15,406	82.54
82	Republican	Adam Harris	Retired	Independent	Elizabeth Book	3,258	17.46
83	Republican	Jeff Wheeland	Re-elected	Republican	Jeff Wheeland	13,108	65.94
83	Republican	Jeff Wheeland	Re-elected	Democratic	Airneezer Page-Delahaye	6,771	34.06
84	Republican	Garth Everett	Re-elected	Republican	Garth Everett	18,192	78.93
84	Republican	Garth Everett	Re-elected	Democratic	Linda Sosniak	4,855	21.07
85	Republican	Fred Keller	Re-elected	Republican	Fred Keller	14,714	67.73
85	Republican	Fred Keller	Re-elected	Democratic	Jennifer Rager-Kay	7,012	32.27
86	Republican	Mark Keller	Re-elected	Republican	Mark Keller	16,152	71.89
86	Republican	Mark Keller	Re-elected	Democratic	Karen Anderson	6,317	28.11
87	Republican	Greg Rothman	Re-elected	Republican	Greg Rothman	18,541	56.62
87	Republican	Greg Rothman	Re-elected	Democratic	Sean Quinlan	14,201	43.38
88	Republican	Sheryl Delozier	Re-elected	Republican	Sheryl Delozier	16,134	58.10
88	Republican	Sheryl Delozier	Re-elected	Democratic	Jean Marie Foschi	11,636	41.9
89	Republican	Rob Kauffman	Re-elected	Republican	Rob Kauffman	18,087	100.00
90	Republican	Paul Schemel	Re-elected	Republican	Paul Schemel	19,096	100.00
91	Republican	Dan Moul	Re-elected	Republican	Dan Moul	20,069	63.06
91	Republican	Dan Moul	Re-elected	Democratic	Marty Qually	9,324	36.94
92	Republican	Dawn Keefer	Re-elected	Republican	Dawn Keefer	19,528	69.23
92	Republican	Dawn Keefer	Re-elected	Democratic	Shanna Danielson	8,679	30.77
93	Republican	Kristin Phillips-Hill	Retired	Republican	Paul M. Jones	18,036	65.88
93	Republican	Kristin Phillips-Hill	Retired	Democratic	Delma Rivera-Lytle	9,341	34.12
94	Republican	Stan Saylor	Re-elected	Republican	Stan Saylor	15,799	66.31
94	Republican	Stan Saylor	Re-elected	Democratic	Stephen Snell	8,027	33.69
95	Democratic	Carol Hill-Evans	Re-elected	Democratic	Carol Hill-Evans	12,297	100.00
96	Democratic	Mike Sturla	Re-elected	Democratic	Mike Sturla	15,318	100.00
97	Republican	Steven Mentzer	Re-elected	Republican	Steven Mentzer	18,469	56.64
97	Republican	Steven Mentzer	Re-elected	Democratic	Dana Gulick	14,137	43.36
98	Republican	Dave Hickernell	Re-elected	Republican	Dave Hickernell	15,577	64.49
98	Republican	Dave Hickernell	Re-elected	Democratic	Mary Auker-Endres	7,993	33.09
98	Republican	Dave Hickernell	Re-elected	Libertarian	James Miller	584	2.42
99	Republican	David Zimmerman	Re-elected	Republican	David Zimmerman	14,328	71.43
99	Republican	David Zimmerman	Re-elected	Democratic	Elizabeth Malarkey	5,731	28.57
100	Republican	Bryan Cutler	Re-elected	Republican	Bryan Cutler	14,111	72.05
100	Republican	Bryan Cutler	Re-elected	Democratic	Dale Allen Hamby	5,475	27.95
101	Republican	Frank Ryan	Re-elected	Republican	Frank Ryan	15,512	64.46
101	Republican	Frank Ryan	Re-elected	Democratic	Cesar Liriano	8,553	35.54
102	Republican	Russ Diamond	Re-elected	Republican	Russ Diamond	17,966	100.00
103	Democratic	Patty Kim	Re-elected	Democratic	Patty Kim	15,422	83.98
103	Democratic	Patty Kim	Re-elected	Republican	Anthony Harrell	2,941	16.02
104	Republican	Sue Helm	Re-elected	Republican	Sue Helm	15,385	54.48
104	Republican	Sue Helm	Re-elected	Democratic	Patty Smith	12,856	45.52
105	Republican	Ron Marsico	Retired	Republican	Andrew Lewis	15,789	50.82
105	Republican	Ron Marsico	Retired	Democratic	Eric Epstein	15,277	49.18
106	Republican	Thomas Mehaffie	Re-elected	Republican	Thomas Mehaffie	14,513	54.58
106	Republican	Thomas Mehaffie	Re-elected	Democratic	Jill Linta	12,079	45.42
107	Republican	Kurt Masser	Re-elected	Republican	Kurt Masser	13,678	67.52
107	Republican	Kurt Masser	Re-elected	Democratic	Sarah Donnelly	6,581	32.48
108	Republican	Lynda Schlegel-Culver	Re-elected	Republican	Lynda Schlegel-Culver	17,541	100.00
109	Republican	David Millard	Re-elected	Republican	David Millard	14,039	66.26
109	Republican	David Millard	Re-elected	Democratic	Edward Thomas Sanders III	7,149	33.74
110	Republican	Tina Pickett	Re-elected	Republican	Tina Pickett	14,648	71.19
110	Republican	Tina Pickett	Re-elected	Democratic	Donna Iannone	5,929	28.81
111	Republican	Jon Fritz	Re-elected	Republican	Jon Fritz	16,244	71.70
111	Republican	Jon Fritz	Re-elected	Democratic	Rebecca Kinney	6,412	28.30
112	Democratic	Kevin Haggerty	Retired	Democratic	Kyle Mullins	17,081	69.69
112	Democratic	Kevin Haggerty	Retired	Republican	Ernest D. Lemoncelli	7,428	30.31
113	Democratic	Marty Flynn	Re-elected	Democratic	Marty Flynn	16,661	100.00
114	Democratic	Sid Michaels Kavulich	Re-elected (Died in office but name remained on ballot)	Democratic	Sid Michaels Kavulich	15,787	100.00
115	Democratic	Maureen Madden	Re-elected	Democratic	Maureen Madden	11,316	60.11
115	Democratic	Maureen Madden	Re-elected	Republican	David Parker	7,511	39.89
116	Republican	Tarah Toohil	Re-elected	Republican	Tarah Toohil	14,996	100.00
117	Republican	Karen Boback	Re-elected	Republican	Karen Boback	18,360	82.12
117	Republican	Karen Boback	Re-elected	Libertarian	Louis R. Jasikoff	3,998	17.88
118	Democratic	Mike Carroll	Re-elected	Democratic	Mike Carroll	15,936	100.00
119	Democratic	Jerry Mullery	Re-elected	Democratic	Jerry Mullery	10,719	53.06
119	Democratic	Jerry Mullery	Re-elected	Republican	Justin Valera Behrens	9,484	46.94
120	Republican	Aaron Kaufer	Re-elected	Republican	Aaron Kaufer	16,667	100.00
121	Democratic	Eddie Day Pashinski	Re-elected	Democratic	Eddie Day Pashinski	9,690	57.30
121	Democratic	Eddie Day Pashinski	Re-elected	Republican	Susan Henry	7,222	42.70
122	Republican	Doyle Heffley	Re-elected	Republican	Doyle Heffley	14,355	67.11
122	Republican	Doyle Heffley	Re-elected	Democratic	Kara Scott	7,035	32.89
123	Democratic	Neal Goodman	Re-elected	Democratic	Neal Goodman	12,020	100.00
124	Republican	Jerry Knowles	Re-elected	Republican	Jerry Knowles	17,929	100.00
125	Republican	Mike Tobash	Re-elected	Republican	Mike Tobash	18,243	100.00
126	Democratic	Mark Rozzi	Re-elected	Democratic	Mark Rozzi	15,291	100.00
127	Democratic	Tom Caltagirone	Re-elected	Democratic	Tom Caltagirone	8,333	79.93
127	Democratic	Tom Caltagirone	Re-elected	Republican	Vincent Gagliardo Jr.	2,092	20.07
128	Republican	Mark Gillen	Re-elected	Republican	Mark Gillen	16,707	60.40
128	Republican	Mark Gillen	Re-elected	Democratic	Doug Metcalfe	10.955	39.60
129	Republican	Jim Cox	Re-elected	Republican	Jim Cox	14,564	54.95
129	Republican	Jim Cox	Re-elected	Democratic	Tricia Wertz	11,940	45.05
130	Republican	David Maloney	Re-elected	Republican	David Maloney	18,369	100.00
131	Republican	Justin Simmons	Re-elected	Republican	Justin Simmons	15,579	52.82
131	Republican	Justin Simmons	Re-elected	Democratic	Andrew Lee	13,915	47.18
132	Democratic	Mike Schlossberg	Re-elected	Democratic	Mike Schlossberg	14,025	100.00
133	Democratic	Jeanne McNeill	Re-elected	Democratic	Jeanne McNeill	15,366	100.00
134	Republican	Ryan Mackenzie	Re-elected	Republican	Ryan Mackenzie	16,237	57.29
134	Republican	Ryan Mackenzie	Re-elected	Democratic	Thomas Applebach	12,107	42.71
135	Democratic	Steve Samuelson	Re-elected	Democratic	Steve Samuelson	15,872	100.00
136	Democratic	Bob Freeman	Re-elected	Democratic	Bob Freeman	14,516	100.00
137	Republican	Joe Emrick	Re-elected	Republican	Joe Emrick	14,200	55.26
137	Republican	Joe Emrick	Re-elected	Democratic	Amy Cozze	11,203	43.60
137	Republican	Joe Emrick	Re-elected	Libertarian	Ed Reagan	293	1.14
138	Republican	Marcia Hahn	Re-elected	Republican	Marcia Hahn	16,705	57.76
138	Republican	Marcia Hahn	Re-elected	Democratic	Dean Donaher	11,741	40.60
138	Republican	Marcia Hahn	Re-elected	Libertarian	Jake Towne	474	1.64
139	Republican	Mike Peifer	Re-elected	Republican	Mike Peifer	17,048	68.46
139	Republican	Mike Peifer	Re-elected	Democratic	Orlando Marrero	7,853	31.54
140	Democratic	John Galloway	Re-elected	Democratic	John Galloway	17,490	100.00
141	Democratic	Tina Davis	Re-elected	Democratic	Tina Davis	13,347	62.13
141	Democratic	Tina Davis	Re-elected	Republican	Anthony Sposato	8,137	37.87
142	Republican	Frank Farry	Re-elected	Republican	Frank Farry	18,177	56.07
142	Republican	Frank Farry	Re-elected	Democratic	Malinda Lareau	14,241	43.93
143	Republican	Marguerite Quinn	Ran for State Senate	Democratic	Wendy Ullman	17,339	50.84
143	Republican	Marguerite Quinn	Ran for State Senate	Republican	Joseph Patrick Flood	16,763	49.16
144	Republican	Kathy Watson	Retired	Republican	Todd Polinchock	15,457	50.97
144	Republican	Kathy Watson	Retired	Democratic	Meredith Buck	14,867	49.03
145	Republican	Craig Staats	Re-elected	Republican	Craig Staats	15,598	56.52
145	Republican	Craig Staats	Re-elected	Democratic	Brian Kline	11,997	43.48
146	Republican	Tom Quigley	Defeated	Democratic	Joe Ciresi	14,093	55.53
146	Republican	Tom Quigley	Defeated	Republican	Tom Quigley	11,286	44.47
147	Republican	Marcy Toepel	Re-elected	Republican	Marcy Toepel	15,776	56.67
147	Republican	Marcy Toepel	Re-elected	Democratic	Joshua Camson	12,056	43.33
148	Democratic	Mary Jo Daley	Re-elected	Democratic	Mary Jo Daley	26,807	100.00
149	Democratic	Tim Briggs	Re-elected	Democratic	Tim Briggs	23,320	100.00
150	Republican	Mike Corr	Retired	Democratic	Joe Webster	15,535	56.01
150	Republican	Mike Corr	Retired	Republican	Nicholas Fountain	12,201	43.99
151	Republican	Todd Stephens	Re-elected	Republican	Todd Stephens	15,340	51.49
151	Republican	Todd Stephens	Re-elected	Democratic	Sara Johnson Rothman	14,451	48.51
152	Republican	Tom Murt	Re-elected	Republican	Tom Murt	16,469	54.98
152	Republican	Tom Murt	Re-elected	Democratic	Daryl Boling	13,488	45.02
153	Democratic	Madeleine Dean	Ran for Congress	Democratic	Ben Sanchez	23,694	70.76
153	Democratic	Madeleine Dean	Ran for Congress	Republican	Douglas Beaver Jr.	9,437	28.18
153	Democratic	Madeleine Dean	Ran for Congress	Libertarian	Marc Bozzacco	353	1.05
154	Democratic	Steve McCarter	Re-elected	Democratic	Steve McCarter	26,592	81.47
154	Democratic	Steve McCarter	Re-elected	Republican	Kathleen Bowers	6,047	18.53
155	Republican	Becky Corbin	Defeated	Democratic	Danielle Friel Otten	18,434	54.65
155	Republican	Becky Corbin	Defeated	Republican	Becky Corbin	15,300	45.35
156	Democratic	Carolyn Comitta	Re-elected	Democratic	Carolyn Comitta	17,923	56.51
156	Democratic	Carolyn Comitta	Re-elected	Republican	Nicholas Deminski	13,792	43.49
157	Republican	Warren Kampf	Defeated	Democratic	Melissa Shusterman	17,681	56.58
157	Republican	Warren Kampf	Defeated	Republican	Warren Kampf	13,567	43.42
158	Republican	Eric M. Roe	Defeated	Democratic	Christina Sappey	15,641	53.44
158	Republican	Eric M. Roe	Defeated	Republican	Eric M. Roe	13,628	46.56
159	Democratic	Brian Joseph Kirkland	Re-elected	Democratic	Brian Joseph Kirkland	13,379	76.49
159	Democratic	Brian Joseph Kirkland	Re-elected	Republican	Ruth Moton	4,113	23.51
160	Republican	Steve Barrar	Re-elected	Republican	Steve Barrar	15,480	51.47
160	Republican	Steve Barrar	Re-elected	Democratic	Anton Andrew	14,593	48.53
161	Democratic	Leanne Krueger-Braneky	Re-elected	Democratic	Leanne Krueger-Braneky	17,573	58.50
161	Democratic	Leanne Krueger-Braneky	Re-elected	Republican	Pattie Rodgers Morrisette	12,467	41.50
162	Republican	Nick Miccarelli	Retired	Democratic	David Delloso	12,826	51.55
162	Republican	Nick Miccarelli	Retired	Republican	Mary Hopper	12,056	48.45
163	Republican	James Santora	Defeated	Democratic	Michael Zabel	15,000	53.42
163	Republican	James Santora	Defeated	Republican	James Santora	13,077	46.58
164	Democratic	Margo Davidson	Re-elected	Democratic	Margo Davidson	17,490	83.07
164	Democratic	Margo Davidson	Re-elected	Republican	Inderjit Singh Bains	3,565	16.93
165	Republican	Alex Charlton	Defeated	Democratic	Jennifer O'Mara	15,639	50.25
165	Republican	Alex Charlton	Defeated	Republican	Alex Charlton	15,485	49.75
166	Democratic	Greg Vitali	Re-elected	Democratic	Greg Vitali	22,728	72.54
166	Democratic	Greg Vitali	Re-elected	Republican	Baltazar Rubio	8,604	27.46
167	Republican	Duane Milne	Defeated	Democratic	Kristine Howard	17,109	52.15
167	Republican	Duane Milne	Defeated	Republican	Duane Milne	15,700	47.85
168	Republican	Christopher B. Quinn	Re-elected	Republican	Christopher B. Quinn	16,569	51.17
168	Republican	Christopher B. Quinn	Re-elected	Democratic	Kristin Seale	15,811	48.83
169	Republican	Kate Klunk	Re-elected	Republican	Kate Klunk	17,688	70.57
169	Republican	Kate Klunk	Re-elected	Democratic	Sarah Hammond	7,378	29.43
170	Republican	Martina White	Re-elected	Republican	Martina White	11,754	57.61
170	Republican	Martina White	Re-elected	Democratic	Michael F Doyle Jr.	8,650	42.39
171	Republican	Kerry Benninghoff	Re-elected	Republican	Kerry Benninghoff	17,398	59.13
171	Republican	Kerry Benninghoff	Re-elected	Democratic	Erin McCracken	12,023	40.87
172	Democratic	Kevin Boyle	Re-elected	Democratic	Kevin Boyle	14,598	100.00
173	Democratic	Michael Driscoll	Re-elected	Democratic	Michael Driscoll	13,757	100.00
174	Democratic	Ed Neilson	Re-elected	Democratic	Ed Neilson	14,213	100.00
175	Democratic	Mike O'Brien	Retired	Democratic	Mary-Louise Isaacson	24,538	100.00
176	Republican	Jack Rader	Re-elected	Republican	Jack Rader	11,635	54.74
176	Republican	Jack Rader	Re-elected	Democratic	Claudette Williams	9,621	45.26
177	Republican	John Taylor	Retired	Democratic	Joseph C. Hohenstein	11,436	59.43
177	Republican	John Taylor	Retired	Republican	Patty Kozlowski	7,808	40.57
178	Republican	Scott Petri	Resigned. Special election held.	Republican	Wendi Thomas	17,608	50.83
178	Republican	Scott Petri	Resigned. Special election held.	Democratic	Helen Tai	17,036	49.17
179	Democratic	Jason Dawkins	Re-elected	Democratic	Jason Dawkins	14,735	100.00
180	Democratic	Angel Cruz	Re-elected	Democratic	Angel Cruz	10,418	100.00
181	Democratic	Curtis Thomas	Retired	Democratic	Malcolm Kenyatta	21,382	95.32
181	Democratic	Curtis Thomas	Retired	Republican	Thomas M. Street	1,050	4.68
182	Democratic	Brian Sims	Re-elected	Democratic	Brian Sims	28,234	90.56
182	Democratic	Brian Sims	Re-elected	Independent	James McDevitt	2,943	9.44
183	Republican	Zachary Mako	Re-elected	Republican	Zachary Mako	14,020	56.64
183	Republican	Zachary Mako	Re-elected	Democratic	Jason Ruff	10,731	43.36
184	Democratic	Bill Keller	Retired	Democratic	Elizabeth Fiedler	17,441	100.00
185	Democratic	Maria Donatucci	Re-elected	Democratic	Maria Donatucci	20,087	100.00
186	Democratic	Jordan Harris	Re-elected	Democratic	Jordan Harris	25,775	100.00
187	Republican	Gary Day	Re-elected	Republican	Gary Day	16,018	59.35
187	Republican	Gary Day	Re-elected	Democratic	Michael Blichar	10,972	40.65
188	Democratic	Jim Roebuck	Re-elected	Democratic	Jim Roebuck	22,868	100.00
189	Republican	Rosemary Brown	Re-elected	Republican	Rosemary Brown	12,085	58.55
189	Republican	Rosemary Brown	Re-elected	Democratic	Adam Rodriguez	8,557	41.45
190	Democratic	Vanessa Brown	Re-elected	Democratic	Vanessa Brown	22,644	100.00
191	Democratic	Joanna E. McClinton	Re-elected	Democratic	Joanna E. McClinton	20,372	100.00
192	Democratic	Morgan Cephas	Re-elected	Democratic	Morgan Cephas	25,070	100.00
193	Republican	Will Tallman	Retired	Republican	Torren Ecker	16,388	67.92
193	Republican	Will Tallman	Retired	Democratic	Matt Nelson	7,740	32.08
194	Democratic	Pamela DeLissio	Re-elected	Democratic	Pamela DeLissio	22,745	78.03
194	Democratic	Pamela DeLissio	Re-elected	Republican	Sean Patrick Stevens	5,648	19.38
194	Democratic	Pamela DeLissio	Re-elected	Libertarian	Matthew Baltsar	755	2.59
195	Democratic	Donna Bullock	Re-elected	Democratic	Donna Bullock	25,525	100.00
196	Republican	Seth Grove	Re-elected	Republican	Seth Grove	19,632	100.00
197	Democratic	Danilo Burgos	Re-elected	Democratic	Danilo Burgos	15,473	100.00
198	Democratic	Rosita Youngblood	Re-elected	Democratic	Rosita Youngblood	22,164	100.00
199	Republican	Stephen Bloom	Ran for Congress	Republican	Barbara Gleim	14,733	58.86
199	Republican	Stephen Bloom	Ran for Congress	Democratic	Joseph McGinnis Jr.	9,866	39.41
199	Republican	Stephen Bloom	Ran for Congress	Libertarian	Charles Boust	433	1.73
200	Democratic	Chris Rabb	Re-elected	Democratic	Chris Rabb	32,558	100.00
201	Democratic	Stephen Kinsey	Re-elected	Democratic	Stephen Kinsey	22,903	100.00
202	Democratic	Jared Solomon	Re-elected	Democratic	Jared Solomon	14,153	100.00
203	Democratic	Isabella Fitzgerald	Re-elected	Democratic	Isabella Fitzgerald	22,825	100.00
