= Donatucci =

Donatucci is an Italian surname. Notable people with the surname include:

- Maria Donatucci (born 1954), American politician
- Robert Donatucci (1952–2010), American politician, husband of Maria
- Ronald Donatucci (1948–2020), American politician
- Sandy Donatucci, American politician
