= Michael Armanini =

American politician

Member of the Pennsylvania House of Representatives from the 75th district
- Incumbent
- Assumed office December 1, 2020
- Preceded by: Matt Gabler

Personal details
- Born: Kersey, Pennsylvania, U.S.
- Party: Republican
- Spouse: Valerie
- Children: 2
- Education: Clarion University of Pennsylvania (BS)

Michael Armanini is an American politician serving as a member of the Pennsylvania House of Representatives from the 75th district. Elected in November 2020, he assumed office on December 1, 2020.

== Early life and education ==
Armanini was born in Kersey, Pennsylvania and graduated from Elk County Catholic High School in 1981. He earned a Bachelor of Science degree in business administration from Clarion University of Pennsylvania in 1985.

== Career ==
Armanini began his career in the metallurgy industry in 1987, working for Laurel Manufacturing. In 1997, he co-founded Product Assurance Services and Proform Powdered Metals. In 2015, after leaving the metallurgy industry, he became the headmaster of the Central Catholic High School. He was elected to the Pennsylvania House of Representatives in November 2020 and assumed office on December 1, 2020.

== House of Representatives ==
For the 2025-2026 Session, Armanini sits on the following committees:

- Energy
- Liquor Control
- Professional Licensure
- Tourism, Recreation & Economic Development
  - Subcommittee on Travel Promotion, History & Heritage Republican Chair

== Personal life ==
Armanini lives in Treasure Lake, Pennsylvania with his wife, Valerie, and their two children.
