= Pennsylvania House of Representatives, District 178 =

American legislative district

Pennsylvania's 178th State House of Representatives district
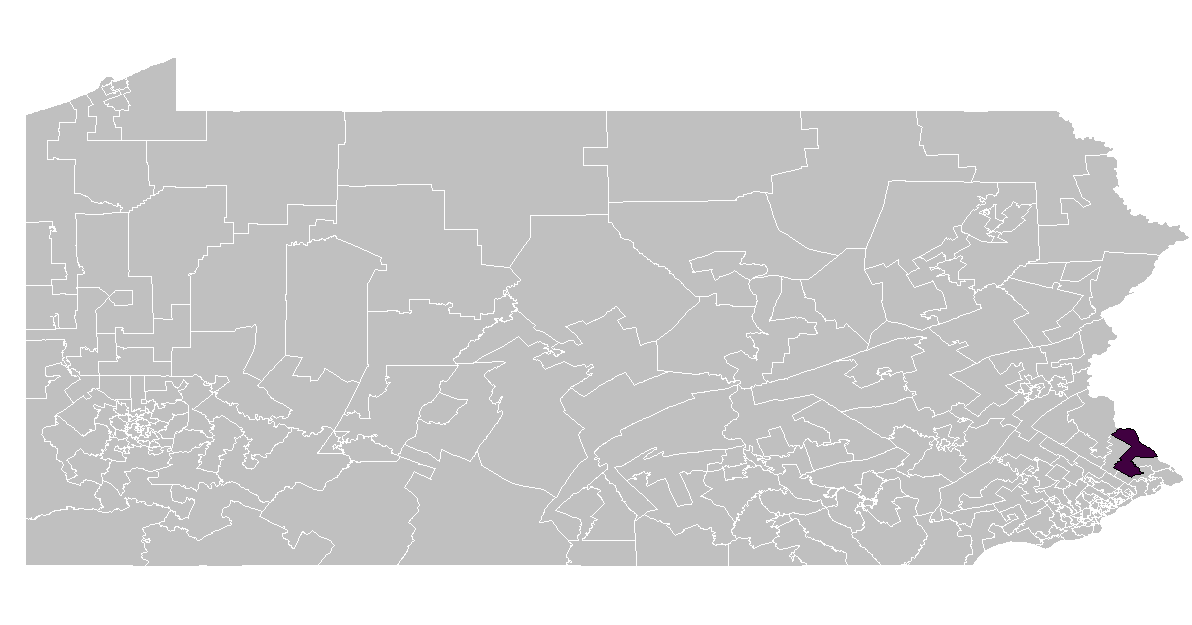
Representative
Kristin Marcell; R–Wrightstown Township

The 178th Pennsylvania House of Representatives District is located in Bucks County and includes the following areas:

- Northampton Township [PART, Districts 01, 02, 03, 04, 05, 06, 07, 08, 11, 12, 13, 15, 16, 17 and 18]
- Upper Southampton Township
- Warwick Township
- Wrightstown Township

== Representatives ==
Representative	Party	Years	District home	Note
Prior to 1969, seats were apportioned by county.
Harry R. J. Comer	Democrat	1969 – 1974		
James M. McIntyre	Democrat	1975 – 1982		Subsequently, represented the 180th district
District moved from Philadelphia County to Bucks County after 1982.
Roy Reinard	Republican	1983 – 2002	Holland	
Scott Petri	Republican	2003 – 2017	New Hope	Subsequently became Executive Director of the Philadelphia Parking Authority
Special Election held for remainder of Scott Petri's term.
Helen Tai	Democrat	2018 – 2019	Solebury	
Wendi Thomas	Republican	2019 – 2023	Northampton Township	
Kristin Marcell	Republican	2023 – present	Wrightstown Township	
