= Bonetto =

Bonetto is a surname. Notable people with the surname include:

- Aline Bonetto, French production designer and set decorator
- Felice Bonetto (1903–1953), racing driver
- Jani Bonetto, a cast member from the 1987 Argentine drama film Babilonia
- Joseph Bonetto (1921–1988), Democratic member of the Pennsylvania House of Representatives
- Mattia Bonetto (born 1997), Italian professional footballer
- Riccardo Bonetto (born 1979), Italian footballer

== Fictional characters ==
- Bonetto, a character from the 1975 Italian thriller film The Sunday Woman
