= Coppolino =

Coppolino is an Italian surname. Notable people with the surname include:

- Andrea Coppolino (born 1979), Italian artistic gymnast
- Carl A. Coppolino (1933 – after 1979), American murderer
- Eric Francis Coppolino (born 1964), American journalist
- Matthew Coppolino (1929–2000), American politician
- Nadia Bartel, née Coppolino (born 1985), Australian model
