= Roger Duffy =

Roger Duffy may refer to:

- Roger Duffy (architect), American architect
- Roger Duffy (American football) (born 1967), center and guard
- Roger F. Duffy, Pennsylvania politician
- Roger Duffy (Australian rules footballer) (born 1931), former Australian rules footballer
