= Bossert =

Bossert may refer to:

== People ==
- André Bossert (born 1963), Swiss professional golfer
- Gregory Norman Bossert (born 1962), American writer and filmmaker
- Helmuth Theodor Bossert (1889–1961), German art historian, philologist and archaeologist
- Joseph Bossert (1851–1906), French astronomer
- Laura Anne Bossert (born 1968), American violinist, violist and pedagogue
- Otto Richard Bossert (1874–1919), German portrait painter
- Tom Bossert (born 1975), American lawyer and government official
- W. Max Bossert (1906–1990), American football coach and politician
- Walter F. Bossert (1885–1946), Grand Dragon of the Ku Klux Klan for Indiana, USA
- Walter Bossert (born 1962), German economist

== Places ==
- Bossert Estates, New Jersey, unincorporated community located within Bordentown Township in Burlington County, New Jersey, United States
- Hotel Bossert, a hotel in Brooklyn, New York City, USA
