= Distler =

Distler is a German surname. Notable people with the surname include:

- Hugo Distler (1908–1942), German composer
- Jacques Distler (born 1961), American physicist
- James Distler (1934-2015), American politician

== See also ==
- 11037 Distler, main-belt asteroid
