= Wendi Thomas =

American politician

Member of the Pennsylvania House of Representatives from the 178th district
- In office January 1, 2019 – January 3, 2023
- Preceded by: Helen Tai
- Succeeded by: Kristin Marcell

Personal details
- Party: Republican
- Education: Gettysburg College

Wendi Thomas is a Republican member of the Pennsylvania House of Representatives from the 178th Legislative District.

== Career ==
Thomas previously served on the school board for the Council Rock School District.

=== Pennsylvania House of Representatives ===
Thomas ran in a special election to replace outgoing State Representative Scott Petri, who resigned his seat to become the executive director of the Philadelphia Parking Authority, but lost to Democrat Helen Tai by 51% to 49% margin. Thomas ran again in the November general election and defeated Tai by a 500-vote margin.

==== Tenure ====
Thomas authored House Bill 1421, a bill to increase burial benefits to ensure veterans are laid to rest with military honors. The bill was unanimously passed by the house on June 9, 2021.
