= Pennsylvania House of Representatives, District 33 =

American legislative district

Pennsylvania's 33rd State House of Representatives district
Representative
| Mandy Steele; D–Fox Chapel |
- Population (2022): 61,859

The 33rd Pennsylvania House of Representatives District is in southwest Pennsylvania and has been represented by Mandy Steele since 2023.

== District profile ==
The 33rd District is located in Allegheny County and includes the following areas:

- Aspinwall
- Blawnox
- Brackenridge
- Cheswick
- East Deer Township
- Fawn Township
- Fox Chapel
- Frazer Township
- Harmar Township
- Harrison Township
- Indiana Township
- O'Hara Township
- Sharpsburg
- Springdale
- Springdale Township
- Tarentum

== Representatives ==
| Representative | Party | Years | District home | Note |
Prior to 1969, seats were apportioned by county.
| Joseph F. Bonetto | Democrat | 1969 – 1976 | | |
| Roger F. Duffy | Democrat | 1977 – 1988 | | |
| Ted V. Kedrich | Republican | 1989 – 1990 | | |
| Frank Dermody | Democrat | 1991 – 2020 | Oakmont | |
| Carrie DelRosso | Republican | 2021 – 2022 | | Redistricted out of 33rd |
| Mandy Steele | Democrat | 2023 – present | | Incumbent |

== Recent election results ==
PA House election, 2024: Pennsylvania House, District 33
| Party | Candidate | Votes | % |
|---|---|---|---|
| Democratic | Mandy Steele (incumbent) | 20,030 | 55.80 |
| Republican | Gary Lotz | 15,867 | 44.20 |
| Total votes | | 35,897 | 100.00 |
| Democratic hold | | | |

PA House election, 2022: Pennsylvania House, District 33
| Party | Candidate | Votes | % |
|---|---|---|---|
| Democratic | Mandy Steele | 15,945 | 54.86 |
| Republican | Theodore Tomson II | 13,120 | 45.14 |
| Total votes | | 29,065 | 100.00 |
| Democratic gain from Republican | | | |

PA House election, 2020: Pennsylvania House, District 33
| Party | Candidate | Votes | % |
|---|---|---|---|
| Republican | Carrie DelRosso | 16,383 | 51.39 |
| Democratic | Frank Dermody (incumbent) | 15,494 | 48.61 |
| Total votes | | 31,877 | 100.00 |
| Republican gain from Democratic | | | |

PA House election, 2018: Pennsylvania House, District 33
| Party | Candidate | Votes | % |
|---|---|---|---|
| Democratic | Frank Dermody (incumbent) | 12,979 | 55.70 |
| Republican | Joshua Nulph | 10,321 | 44.30 |
| Total votes | | 23,300 | 100.00 |
| Democratic hold | | | |

PA House election, 2016: Pennsylvania House, District 33
| Party | Candidate | Votes | % |
|---|---|---|---|
| Democratic | Frank Dermody (incumbent) | Unopposed | |
| Total votes | | 21,589 | 100.00 |
| Democratic hold | | | |

PA House election, 2014: Pennsylvania House, District 33
| Party | Candidate | Votes | % |
|---|---|---|---|
| Democratic | Frank Dermody (incumbent) | 8,668 | 53.02 |
| Republican | Sean Watson | 7,681 | 46.98 |
| Total votes | | 16,349 | 100.00 |
| Democratic hold | | | |

PA House election, 2012: Pennsylvania House, District 33
| Party | Candidate | Votes | % |
|---|---|---|---|
| Democratic | Frank Dermody (incumbent) | 16,101 | 58.97 |
| Republican | Gerry Vaerewyck | 11,203 | 41.03 |
| Total votes | | 27,304 | 100.00 |
| Democratic hold | | | |

PA House election, 2010: Pennsylvania House, District 33
| Party | Candidate | Votes | % |
|---|---|---|---|
| Democratic | Frank Dermody (incumbent) | 11,305 | 56.23 |
| Republican | Gerry Vaerewyck | 8,799 | 43.77 |
| Total votes | | 20,104 | 100.00 |
| Democratic hold | | | |
