= Ted V. Kondrich =

American politician

Theodore "Ted" V. Kondrich
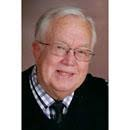

Member of the Pennsylvania House of Representatives from the 33rd district
- In office January 3, 1989 – November 30, 1990
- Preceded by: Roger Duffy
- Succeeded by: Frank Dermody

Personal details
- Born: July 10, 1935 Turtle Creek, Pennsylvania
- Died: February 6, 2018 (aged 82) Allegheny County, Pennsylvania
- Party: Republican
- Spouse: Marcia L. Wilson
- Children: Keith G. Kondrich (Helen Laffey); Kurt A. Kondrich (Margie Matta); Marla Kondrich Brashear (Mark Brashear); Tanya Kondrich Bosack (Bill Bosack)
- Education: Turtle Creek High School; Duquesne University
- Occupation: Accountant, Politician, Public Servant

Theodore "Ted" Vincent Kondrich (July 10, 1935 – February 6, 2018) was a Republican member of the Pennsylvania House of Representatives.

== Biography ==
A 1953 graduate of Turtle Creek High School, Kondrich studied accounting at Duquesne University. He spent most of his career as an accountant for Westinghouse before entering public service.

In addition to service in the United States Army, Kondrich served as a Plum Borough councilman, Pennsylvania state representative, deputy director of the Allegheny County Elections Department and as a special consultant to Allegheny County district attorney, Stephen A. Zappala Jr. Kondrich became known for his bipartisan approach.

Kondrich was a Roman Catholic who was an active member of various parishes within the Diocese of Pittsburgh throughout his life, including St. Colman (Turtle Creek), Our Lady of Joy and Saint John the Baptist (Plum), and, most recently, St. Richard (Gibsonia).

== Career ==
- United States Army (1958-1960)
- Accountant, Westinghouse Corporation (28 years)
- Elected, Council, Plum Borough (1980-1983)
- Elected as a Republican to the Pennsylvania House of Representatives in 1988; unsuccessful campaign for reelection to the House (1990)
- Republican Caucus, Pennsylvania House of Representatives
- Division manager, Allegheny County Board of Elections (1996-2003)
- Appointed, Pennsylvania Inter-branch Commission for Gender, Racial, and Ethnic Fairness (2005)
- Special Consultant, District Attorney's Office, Allegheny County
