= Mandy Steele =

American politician

Member of the Pennsylvania House of Representatives from the 33rd district
- Incumbent
- Assumed office December 1, 2022
- Preceded by: Carrie DelRosso

Personal details
- Born: O'Hara Township, Allegheny County, Pennsylvania, U.S.
- Party: Democratic
- Education: University of Pittsburgh

Mandy Steele is an American politician serving as a member of the Pennsylvania House of Representatives for the 33rd district. Elected in November 2022, she was sworn in on January 3, 2023.

== Early life and education ==
Steele was born and raised in O'Hara Township, Allegheny County, Pennsylvania. She graduated from the University of Pittsburgh.

== Career ==
Steele is the founder of two non-profit organizations and served as a member of the Fox Chapel Borough Council for one term. She was elected to the Pennsylvania House of Representatives in November 2022.
