= Regina Young =

American politician

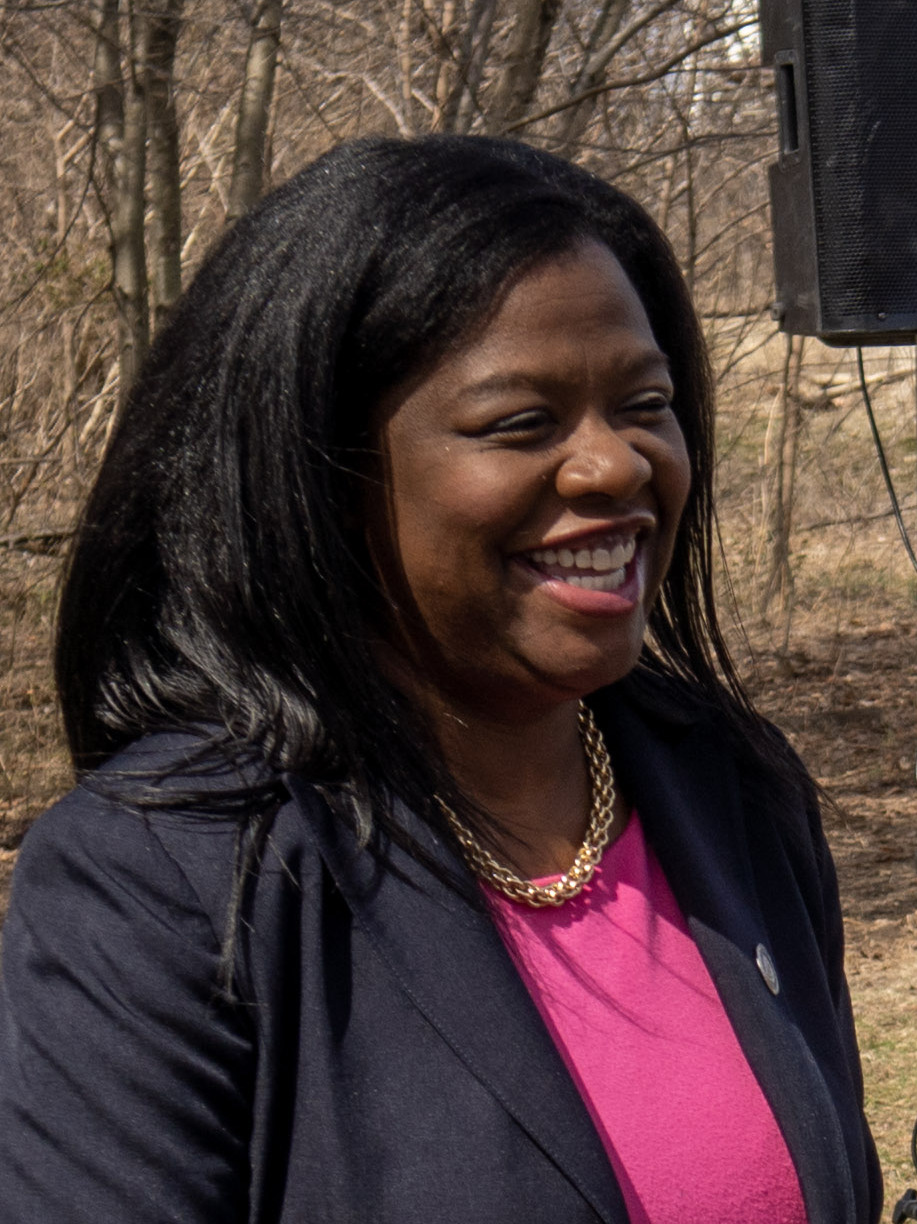
- Young in 2022

Member of the Pennsylvania House of Representatives from the 185th district
- Incumbent
- Assumed office December 1, 2020
- Preceded by: Maria Donatucci

Personal details
- Born: August 23, 1973 (age 53)
- Party: Democratic
- Children: 2
- Education: Central Connecticut State University (BA); Eastern University (MA)

Regina G. Young (born August 23, 1973) is an American politician and community organizer serving as a member of the Pennsylvania House of Representatives from the 185th district. Elected in November 2020, she assumed office on December 1, 2020.

== Education ==
Young earned a Bachelor of Arts degree in communications from Central Connecticut State University and a Master of Arts in community development from Eastern University.

== Career ==
Young has worked as a community organizer, social service worker, and licensed grief counselor. She was also a staffer in the City of Philadelphia Mayor's Office of Education. Young founded the Empowered Community Development Corporation. Young was elected to the Pennsylvania House of Representatives in November 2020 and assumed office on December 1, 2020.

== Personal life ==
Young is an honorary member of Zeta Phi Beta sorority, she was inducted on July 27, 2024 at the sorority's Boulé in Indianapolis, Indiana.
