= Pennsylvania House of Representatives, District 185 =

American legislative district

Pennsylvania's 185th State House of Representatives district
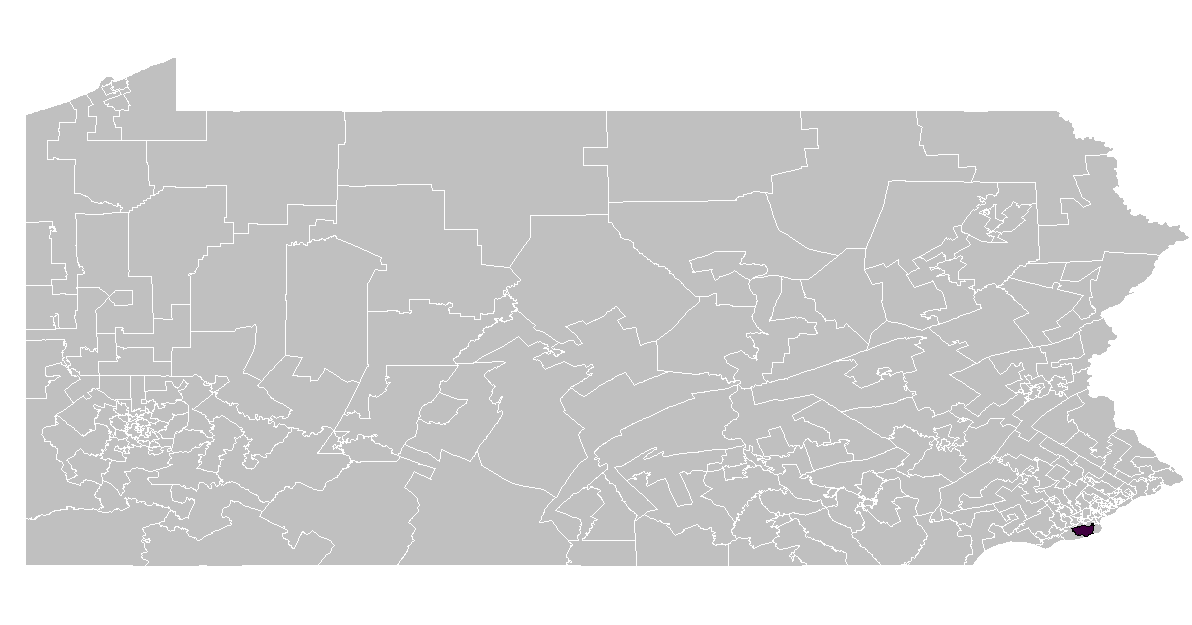
Representative
Regina Young; D–Philadelphia
- Demographics: 36.1% White; 54.4% Black; 3.0% Hispanic
- Population (2011) • Citizens of voting age: 62,552; 46,895

The 185th Pennsylvania House of Representatives District is located in Southeast Pennsylvania and has been represented since 2020 by Regina Young.

== District profile ==
The 185th Pennsylvania House of Representatives District is located in Delaware County and Philadelphia County and encompasses the Philadelphia International Airport and the Simeone Foundation Automotive Museum. It also includes the following areas:

- Delaware County
  - Colwyn
  - Darby Township (PART, Wards 01 and 02)
  - Sharon Hill
- Philadelphia
  - Ward 26
  - Ward 36 [PART, Divisions 10, 11, 12, 13 and 15]
  - Ward 40 [PART, Divisions 01, 15, 16, 17, 18, 22, 27, 28, 29, 30, 31, 32, 35, 36, 37, 38, 39, 40, 41, 42, 43, 44, 45, 46, 48, 49, 50 and 51]
  - Ward 48 [PART, Divisions 01, 02, 03 and 13]

== Representatives ==
Representative	Party	Years	District home	Notes
Before 1967, seats were apportioned by county.
Matthew Coppolino	Republican	1967 – 1972	Philadelphia	Moved from the 17th Philadelphia County district.
Frank Vacca	Republican	1973 – 1974	Philadelphia	Defeated in general election.
Anthony DiDonato	Democratic	1975 – 1976	Philadelphia	
Ronald Donatucci	Democratic	1977 – 1980	Philadelphia	Resigned January 7, 1980.
Robert Donatucci	Democratic	1980 – 2010	Philadelphia	Elected March 11, 1980, to fill vacancy. Re-elected November 2, died November 9, 2010.
Maria Donatucci	Democratic	2011 – 2020	Philadelphia	Elected February 1 to fill vacancy, took office February 15, 2011. Unsuccessful candidate for re-election.
Regina Young	Democratic	2021 – present	Philadelphia	Incumbent

== Recent election results ==
PA House election, 2010: Pennsylvania House, District 185
Party	Candidate	Votes	%
Democratic	Robert Donatucci	13,563	83.52
Republican	Michael Bruno	2,677	16.48
Total votes		16,240	100.00
Democratic hold			

PA House special election, 2011: Pennsylvania House, District 185
Party	Candidate	Votes	%
Democratic	Maria Donatucci	1,843	93.89
Republican	Lewis Harris	120	6.11
Total votes		1,963	100.00
Democratic hold			

PA House election, 2012: Pennsylvania House, District 185
Party	Candidate	Votes	%
Democratic	Maria Donatucci (incumbent)	Unopposed	
Total votes		22,282	100.00
Democratic hold			

PA House election, 2014: Pennsylvania House, District 185
Party	Candidate	Votes	%
Democratic	Maria Donatucci (incumbent)	Unopposed	
Total votes		14,208	100.00
Democratic hold			

PA House election, 2016: Pennsylvania House, District 185
Party	Candidate	Votes	%
Democratic	Maria Donatucci (incumbent)	Unopposed	
Total votes		24,085	100.00
Democratic hold			

PA House election, 2018: Pennsylvania House, District 185
Party	Candidate	Votes	%
Democratic	Maria Donatucci (incumbent)	Unopposed	
Total votes		20,132	100.00
Democratic hold			

PA House Democratic Primary, 2020: Pennsylvania House, District 185
Party	Candidate	Votes	%
Democratic	Regina Young	7,230	57.24
Democratic	Maria Donatucci (incumbent)	5,402	42.76
Total votes		12,632	100.00

PA House election, 2020: Pennsylvania House, District 185
Party	Candidate	Votes	%
Democratic	Regina Young	Unopposed	
Total votes		23,825	100.00
Democratic hold			

== Sources ==
- Trostle, Sharon, ed. (2009). The Pennsylvania Manual. Vol. 119. Harrisburg: Pennsylvania Department of General Services. ISBN 0-8182-0334-X.
