= Anthony DiDonato =

American politician

Anthony DiDonato, Jr.

Member of the Pennsylvania House of Representatives from the 185th district
- In office 1975–1976
- Preceded by: Frank Vacca
- Succeeded by: Ronald Donatucci

Personal details
- Born: January 11, 1911 Brooklyn, New York, United States
- Died: May 10, 1989 (aged 78) Philadelphia, Pennsylvania, United States
- Party: Democratic

Anthony DiDonato, Jr. (January 11, 1911 – May 10, 1989) is a former Democratic member of the Pennsylvania House of Representatives.
