= Phil Jaye =

American comedian (1926–1998)

Philip Joseph Patelmo (January 28, 1926–December 3, 1998) was a stand-up comedian and impressionist known by his stage name, Phil Jaye. Raised in South Philadelphia, Pennsylvania, he performed for many years as part of a comedy and singing duo, The Jaye Brothers, with partner Jerry Jaye Aiena, and as a solo act.

== Early life ==
Phil Jaye was born and raised in a predominantly Italian community near Columbus Square Playground in South Philadelphia, the son of Thomas and Philomena Patelmo. He attended South Philadelphia High School. At 18 years old, Jaye went into the Armed Services and was stationed in Europe during World War II, where he was a machine gunner in an Army pillbox until the Special Services (USO) took him out of the pillbox and made him a drummer and a comedian. After the army, he returned to Philadelphia and began a career in the shoe repair business at the bottom level of Wanamaker's department store. He met and married Jean Maiorano, his wife of fifty years.

== The Jaye Brothers ==
By the 1950s, Phil teamed up with Jerry Aiena, a local singer and piano player, creating The Jaye Brothers, a comedy, dancing and singing duo. The Jaye Brothers were known for their recording of "Rag Mop". The Jaye Brothers performed at area nightclubs like Palumbo's, Sciolla's, and the 500 Club in Atlantic City and the summer circuit in Wildwood, New Jersey, as well as New York City's Latin Quarter, Las Vegas' Thunderbird and tours of Canada, Mexico, and Europe.

== Solo performer ==
Jerry "Jaye" grew tired of the traveling and by the late sixties decided to leave show business. Phil Jaye made the decision to go solo, and he continued to perform for several decades. He told jokes and did musical impersonations of performers such as Dean Martin, Anthony Newley, Louie Armstrong, Louis Prima and Boris Karloff.

Phil Jaye was a regular participant in the Variety Club's "Old News Boys Day" charity event. He also hosted the Annual Phil Jaye Celebrity Golf Tournament to aid the American Cancer Society.

== Death ==
Phil "Jaye" Patelmo died on December 3, 1998, of colon cancer. He and his wife Jean had one daughter, Maria, who later became a Pennsylvania state representative.

== Television appearances ==
- Dick Clark's Band Stand
- The Paul Winchell Show
- Arthur Godfrey Time
- The Jackie Gleason Show
- The Jerry Blavat Show
- PBS "South Philadelphia Italian Style"

== Recordings ==
Rag Mop"....."The Old Two Beat"...."Ain't Nobody Here but us Chicckens",.."Pizza" (Wynne Records) Album: The Singing Comedians"....Strand Records

== Movies ==
"The BLock" (Myers & Benson Production); "Straw to an Inside straight (Saber Productions); "Disk-O-Tek Holiday" (Allied Artist)
