= William Renwick (politician) =

American politician

William F. Renwick

Member of the Pennsylvania House of Representatives from the 75th district
- In office 1969–1978
- Preceded by: District created
- Succeeded by: William Wachob

Member of the Pennsylvania House of Representatives from the Elk County district
- In office 1955–1968

Personal details
- Born: December 30, 1915 St. Mary's, Pennsylvania
- Died: February 28, 1981 (aged 65)
- Party: Democratic

William F. Renwick (December 30, 1915 – February 28, 1981) is a former Democratic member of the Pennsylvania House of Representatives.
