= Pennsylvania House of Representatives, District 76 =

American legislative district

Pennsylvania's 76th State House of Representatives district
Representative
Stephanie Borowicz; R–McElhattan
- Population (2022): 62,712

The 76th Pennsylvania House of Representatives District is located in central Pennsylvania and has been represented by Stephanie Borowicz since 2019.

== District profile ==
The 76th District encompasses all of Clinton County and the following parts of Union County:

- Buffalo Township
- Hartleton
- Hartley Township
- Kelly Township
- Lewis Township
- Lewisburg
- Limestone Township
- Mifflinburg
- New Berlin
- West Buffalo Township

== Representatives ==
Representative	Party	Years	District home	Note
Prior to 1969, seats were apportioned by county.
W. Max Bossert	Republican	1969 – 1970		
Russell P. Letterman	Democrat	1971 – 1990		Died on February 8, 1990
Mike Hanna	Democrat	1991 – 2018	Lock Haven	Retired 2018
Stephanie Borowicz	Republican	2019–present		incumbent

== Recent election results ==
PA House election, 2024: Pennsylvania House, District 76
Party	Candidate	Votes	%
Republican	Stephanie Borowicz (incumbent)	21,393	69.35
Democratic	Denise Maris	9,453	30.65
Total votes		30,846	100.00
Republican hold			

PA House election, 2022: Pennsylvania House, District 76
Party	Candidate	Votes	%
Republican	Stephanie Borowicz (incumbent)	15,776	67.41
Democratic	Denise Maris	7,627	32.59
Total votes		23,403	100.00
Republican hold			

PA House election, 2020: Pennsylvania House, District 76
Party	Candidate	Votes	%
Republican	Stephanie Borowicz (incumbent)	19,175	65.49
Democratic	Joseph Waltz	10,105	34.51
Total votes		29,280	100.00
Republican hold			

PA House election, 2018: Pennsylvania House, District 76
Party	Candidate	Votes	%
Republican	Stephanie Borowicz	11,224	53.72
Democratic	Mike Hanna, Jr.	9,669	46.28
Total votes		20,893	100.00
Republican gain from Democratic			

PA House election, 2016: Pennsylvania House, District 76
Party	Candidate	Votes	%
Democratic	Mike Hanna, Sr. (incumbent)	13,213	52.16
Republican	Stephanie Borowicz	12,121	47.84
Total votes		25,334	100.00
Democratic hold			
