= Stephanie Borowicz =

American politician

Member of the Pennsylvania House of Representatives from the 76th district
- Incumbent
- Assumed office January 1, 2019
- Preceded by: Mike Hanna

Personal details
- Born: March 23, 1977 (age 49) Orlando, Florida, U.S.
- Party: Republican
- Spouse: Jason
- Children: 3
- Education: Vanguard University (BA)
- Website: repstephanie.com

Stephanie Paige Borowicz (born 1977) is an American politician currently serving as a Republican member of the Pennsylvania House of Representatives for the 76th district since 2019.

== Early life and education ==
Borowicz was born on March 23, 1977, in Orlando, Florida. She graduated from Altamonte Christian School in 1995. Borowicz earned a bachelor of arts degree in liberal studies with a minor in Bible studies from Vanguard University, a private Christian university in Orange County, California. She worked as an elementary school teacher and as president of a non-profit organization. She moved to Clinton County, Pennsylvania, in 2009.

== Political career ==
Borowicz first ran for the Pennsylvania House of Representatives in 2016, challenging longtime incumbent Mike Hanna. She would lose that election. In 2018, Hanna decided against seeking re-election. Hanna's son Mike Hanna Jr. ran in his stead, but would lose to Borowicz by around 1,500 votes. Borowicz was re-elected in 2020 and 2022. She is a member of the Pennsylvania Freedom Caucus.

Borowicz garnered national attention when she gave an invocation at the start of a state house session in which she invoked Jesus 13 times, praised President Donald Trump, praised Israel, and said, "at the name of Jesus, every knee will bend." The prayer was given on the same day that Movita Johnson-Harrell was sworn in as the first Muslim woman to serve in the chamber. Johnson-Harrel criticized the invocation as "weaponized prayer" and as an example of Islamophobia. Borowicz brushed off the criticism in an interview with Todd Starnes on Fox News Radio, saying she prayed in the same manner she always prayed. She claimed that people were offended because "there's power in the name of Jesus."

In May 2019, a man in a shirt with the name and logo of the American Guard took a selfie with Borowicz at a pro-gun rally in Harrisburg. Borowicz's photo-op elicited criticism from the Anti-Defamation League who requested Borowicz apologize for the picture due to the American Guard's ties to white supremacy. She would issue a statement, but did not make mention of the American Guard or its ideology, "We do not, nor should we, require ID or background checks as a condition for being photographed with the people of Pennsylvania — our constituents! The many photos taken of me at this year’s Rally to Protect Your Right to Keep and Bear Arms are no different.”

During the COVID-19 pandemic, Borowicz introduced a resolution that suggested the virus was a "punishment inflicted upon us for our presumptuous sins" and sought to proclaim March 30, 2020, a day of humiliation, fasting, and prayer.

Following the 2020 United States presidential election, Borowicz joined 25 other Pennsylvania Republican lawmakers in sponsoring a resolution to demand the decertification of Pennsylvania's electoral votes. The group cited false claims of a rigged election in their resolution.

In 2022, Borowicz introduced a bill modeled after Florida's "Don't Say Gay" law. Her bill would ban discussion of sexual orientation or gender identity in schools through the fifth grade, but Borowicz said the measure should be extended through twelfth grade. The introduction of her bill came after the Pennsylvania Department of Education launched a webpage containing advice for teachers to create "gender-inclusive classrooms." The bill was referred to the State House's Education Committee, but was never taken up. She reintroduced the bill in 2023.

In 2024, Borowicz reportedly jeered former Capitol Police Officers Harry Dunn and Aquilino Gonnell when they visited the State House. The officers defended the Capitol during the January 6 attack on the Capitol, and Borowicz shouted that the attack did not happen and yelled "traitor" at the former officers, according to fellow lawmakers.

Borowicz voted against a grant program that would pay for menstrual products in public schools on the grounds that it would "have government provide everything for you, which leads to communism."

== Personal life ==
Borowicz's husband, Jason, is a pastor and together they have three sons.

== Electoral history ==
2016 Pennsylvania House of Representatives election, District 76
Party	Candidate	Votes	%
Democratic	Mike Hanna Sr. (incumbent)	13,213	52.16
Republican	Stephanie Borowicz	12,121	47.84
Total votes		25,334	100.00

2018 Pennsylvania House of Representatives election, District 76
Party	Candidate	Votes	%
Republican	Stephanie Borowicz	11,224	53.64
Democratic	Mike Hanna Jr.	9,669	46.21
Write-in		30	0.14
Total votes		20,923	100.00

2020 Pennsylvania House of Representatives election, District 76
Party	Candidate	Votes	%
Republican	Stephanie Borowicz (incumbent)	19,157	65.47
Democratic	Joe Waltz	10,080	34.45
Write-in		24	0.08
Total votes		29,261	100.00

2022 Pennsylvania House of Representatives election, District 76
Party	Candidate	Votes	%
Republican	Stephanie Borowicz (incumbent)	15,776	67.41
Democratic	Denise Maris	7,627	32.59
Total votes		23,403	100.00
