= Lynwood Savage =

American politician

Member of the Pennsylvania House of Representatives from the 192nd district
- In office April 5, 2016 – January 3, 2017
- Preceded by: Louise Bishop
- Succeeded by: Morgan Cephas

Personal details
- Born: 1954 (age 71–72) Philadelphia, Pennsylvania
- Party: Democratic

Lynwood W. Savage (born 1954) is a former member of the Pennsylvania House of Representatives. He represented the 192nd House district in Philadelphia, Pennsylvania.

Savage won the special election to complete the term of Rep. Louise Bishop, who resigned due to corruption charges. He subsequently lost the chance for a full term representing the 192nd district to Morgan Cephas in the 2016 Democratic primary.
