= Anita Palermo Kelly =

American politician

Member of the Pennsylvania House of Representatives from the 192nd district
- In office January 7, 1969 – November 30, 1978
- Preceded by: District Created
- Succeeded by: Nick Pucciarelli

Member of the Pennsylvania House of Representatives from the Philadelphia County district
- In office 1965–1968

Personal details
- Born: July 27, 1913 Ozone Park, Queens, New York
- Died: August 15, 1990 (aged 77) Wynnewood, Pennsylvania
- Party: Democratic
- Spouse: William J. Kelly

Anita Palermo Kelly (July 27, 1913 – August 15, 1990) was a former Democratic member of the Pennsylvania House of Representatives from Philadelphia County. She became known for her advocacy work on behalf of people with disabilities and health concerns, as well as senior citizens.

Self-described as "Mother Hubbard" during her legislative years, she was praised by former colleagues, at the time of her death, as "a motherly figure" and "everybody's mom." According to Bob Brady, former U.S. Congressman and chair of Philadelphia's Democratic Party:

"She was as warm as could be. Everything was personal with her. Every constituent who had a problem, she would have him come down and sit in her kitchen. All you had to do is knock on her door, and she'd let you in."

== Formative years ==
Born in Ozone Park, Queens, New York on July 27, 1913, Anita P. Kelly graduated from John Adams High School, and then pursued additional academic studies overseas before returning to the United States.

Her husband was The Honorable William J. Kelly, who preceded her in death.

== Career ==
Employed as a currency counter by the Federal Reserve Bank for thirteen years, Kelly was also active in politics, serving as a member of the 34th Ward's Democratic Executive Committee for twenty-six years.

On November 5, 1963, she won a special election to fill a vacancy in the Pennsylvania House of Representatives that had been created by her husband's death in July of that year. She was sworn in on December 4. She was then re-elected to serve seven additional terms, during which time she became vice chair and then chair of the House's Health and Welfare Committee. Kelly's committee ultimately recommended that a grand jury be empanelled and the Department of Justice become involved in further investigations of the matter.

In 1968, Kelly became a vocal and visible advocate for the passage of House Bill 1223 to ensure that chiropractors could receive payment from insurance plans for the medical services they provided to patients with chronic pain and other medical conditions. In 1969, she served as a member of the Agriculture and Dairy Industries Committee, as vice chair of the Health and Welfare Committee, and as a member of the Professional Licensure Committee. That same year, she chaired a series of four public hearings which investigated the licensing of four flat tracks by the Pennsylvania Horse Racing Commission to determine why none of the licenses were issued to any racing businesses located in western Pennsylvania.

A sponsor of legislation to improve the quality of life for people with developmental disabilities, Kelly also worked to pass legislation that would provide support for people with kidney disease who needed financial assistance in paying for kidney dialysis. In 1973, she co-sponsored legislation with Rep. Thomas Fee to improve the quality of medical care available to Pennsylvanians and address the growing shortage of doctors across the Commonwealth of Pennsylvania by improving training requirements for physicians' assistants in order to enable those healthcare professionals to perform a wider range of medical procedures under the supervision of qualified physicians. In 1975, she advocated for the passage of House Bill 1020 to support adults with disabilities by improving working conditions in sheltered workshops and by providing financial assistance for transportation expenditures and the costs of lunch incurred on school or work days.

After fifteen years of service in the House, she decided against running again for the 1979 term, and retired from the legislature in order to devote more time to her volunteer work.

=== Awards ===
Kelly was a recipient of multiple awards during her lifetime, including the:

- Humanitarian Award, Chapel of the Four Chaplains; and
- Star of Solidarity, Republic of Italy.

== Later years ==
Following her legislative career, Kelly remained active in public service, volunteering at the Edith R. Rudolphy Residence for the Blind in West Philadelphia. Described as "a tireless fundraiser" for the facility, she also organized recreational trips for residents.

== Death and interment ==
Kelly died from cancer at the age of seventy-seven on August 15, 1990, in Lankenau Hospital in Lower Merion Township in Montgomery County, Pennsylvania, and was interred in the Fernwood Cemetery and Mausoleum in Delaware County, Pennsylvania.
