= Kristin Marcell =

American politician

Member of the Pennsylvania House of Representatives from the 178th district
- Incumbent
- Assumed office January 3, 2023
- Preceded by: Wendi Thomas

Personal details
- Born: December 14, 1977 (age 48) Doylestown Township, Pennsylvania, U.S
- Party: Republican
- Education: Penn State University; George Washington University
- Website: Official website

Kristin Marcell is a Republican member of the Pennsylvania House of Representatives, representing the 178th District since 2023.

Political offices
Pennsylvania House of Representatives
Preceded by Wendi Thomas	Member of the Pennsylvania House of Representatives from the 178th district 2023–present	Incumbent
