= Pennsylvania House of Representatives, District 75 =

American legislative district

Pennsylvania's 75th State House of Representatives district
Representative
Michael Armanini; R–Treasure Lake
- Population (2022): 63,767

The 75th Pennsylvania House of Representatives District is located in central Pennsylvania and has been represented by Michael Armanini since 2021.

== District profile ==
The 75th District encompasses all of Elk County and the following parts of Clearfield County:

- Bell Township
- Bloom Township
- Brady Township
- Curwensville
- DuBois
- Ferguson Township
- Grampian
- Greenwood Township
- Huston Township
- Mahaffey
- New Washington
- Newburg
- Penn Township
- Pike Township
- Sandy Township
- Troutville
- Union Township

== Representatives ==
Representative	Party	Years	District home	Note
Prior to 1969, seats were apportioned by county.
William F. Renwick	Democrat	1969 – 1978		
William Wachob	Democrat	1979 – 1984		
James T. Distler	Republican	1985 – 1990		
Dan A. Surra	Democrat	1991 – 2008	Kersey	Unsuccessful candidate for reelection
Matt Gabler	Republican	2009 – 2020	DuBois	
Michael Armanini	Republican	2021 – present		

== Recent election results ==
PA House election, 2024: Pennsylvania House, District 75
Party	Candidate	Votes	%
Republican	Mike Armanini (incumbent)	Unopposed	
Total votes		30,415	100.00
Republican hold			

PA House election, 2022: Pennsylvania House, District 75
Party	Candidate	Votes	%
Republican	Mike Armanini (incumbent)	20,468	76.06
Democratic	Erica Vogt	6,442	23.94
Total votes		26,910	100.00
Republican hold			

PA House election, 2020: Pennsylvania House, District 75
Party	Candidate	Votes	%
Republican	Mike Armanini	25,558	76.22
Democratic	Ryan Grimm	7,973	23.78
Total votes		33,531	100.00
Republican hold			

PA House election, 2018: Pennsylvania House, District 75
Party	Candidate	Votes	%
Republican	Matt Gabler (incumbent)	Unopposed	
Total votes		21,725	100.00
Republican hold			

PA House election, 2016: Pennsylvania House, District 75
Party	Candidate	Votes	%
Republican	Matt Gabler (incumbent)	21,081	72.73
Democratic	Jay Notarianni	7,904	27.27
Total votes		28,985	100.00
Republican hold			
