= Matt Gabler =

American politician

Member of the Pennsylvania House of Representatives from the 75th district
- In office January 6, 2009 – November 30, 2020
- Preceded by: Dan Surra
- Succeeded by: Michael Armanini

Personal details
- Born: July 13, 1983 (age 43) DuBois, Pennsylvania, U.S.
- Party: Republican
- Spouse: Lisa
- Children: 2
- Education: Bucknell University (BA)

Military service
- Allegiance: United States
- Branch/service: United States Army
- Years of service: 2006-2012 (USAR); 2012- (PAARNG)
- Rank: Major
- Unit: 424th Multifunctional Medical Battalion, United States Army Reserve; 28th Infantry Division, Pennsylvania Army National Guard
- Campaigns: Operation Spartan Shield

Matthew M. Gabler (born July 13, 1983) is an American politician who formerly represented the 75th Pennsylvania House of Representatives District from 2009 until 2020.

== Early life and education ==
Gabler graduated valedictorian from DuBois Central Catholic High School. He earned a Bachelor of Arts degree in political science in 2006 with a minor in physics from Bucknell University.

== Career ==
Following graduation from Bucknell University, Gabler was commissioned to serve as a 2nd lieutenant in the United States Army Reserve. He served as commander of the Headquarters and Headquarters Detachment, 424th Multifunctional Medical Battalion before accepting his assignment as a medical logistics officer with the Headquarters, 28th Infantry Division, Pennsylvania Army National Guard. In 2018, then-Captain Gabler was deployed to the Middle East with the 28th Division. The 28th Division was there to provide mission command to troops supporting Operation Spartan Shield. During his deployment, Gabler was promoted to the rank of Major. Prior to being elected to represent the 75th Pennsylvania House of Representatives District, Gabler was a research analyst for the Pennsylvania House of Representatives Republican caucus. In 2008, Gabler was elected to the Pennsylvania House of Representatives and went on to serve a total six terms before deciding to not run for reelection in 2020.
