= Frank Vacca =

American politician

Member of the Pennsylvania House of Representatives from the 185th district
- In office 1973–1974
- Preceded by: Matthew Coppolino
- Succeeded by: Anthony DiDonato

Personal details
- Born: October 5, 1914
- Died: August 4, 1979 (aged 64) Philadelphia, Pennsylvania
- Party: Republican
- Occupation: Real estate broker

Frank Vacca (October 5, 1914 – August 4, 1979) was a Republican member of the Pennsylvania House of Representatives.
