= Nicholas Pucciarelli =

American politician

Nicholas A. Pucciarelli

Member of the Pennsylvania House of Representatives from the 192nd district
- In office January 2, 1979 – November 30, 1982
- Preceded by: Anita Palermo Kelly
- Succeeded by: Chaka Fattah

Personal details
- Born: January 1, 1923 Philadelphia, Pennsylvania
- Died: September 18, 1983 (aged 60) Philadelphia, Pennsylvania
- Party: Democratic

Nicholas A. Pucciarelli (January 1, 1923 – September 18, 1983) was a Democratic member of the Pennsylvania House of Representatives. He was in office from 1979 to 1982. He was born in Philadelphia. He died at a Philadelphia hospital in 1983 at the age of 60.
