= Parking Wars =

American reality television series (2008–2012)

- Opening animation
- Genre: Reality
- Directed by: Daniel Elias; Dan Flaherty; Po Kutchins; Andrew Dunn
- Country of origin: United States
- Original language: English
- No. of seasons: 7
- No. of episodes: 103

Production
- Executive producers: Daniel Elias; David Houts
- Producers: Dan Flaherty; Po Kutchins; Andrew Dunn; Laurissa James; Evian Patterson; Kendall E Canner; Laura Fleury; Rob Sharenow; Jordana Hochman; Laurie Sharpe
- Cinematography: Andrew Dunn; Anneliese Paull; Isaac Mathes; Ben Kutchins
- Editors: Mark Hervey; Eddie Gutch; Kevin Moore; Iain Tibbles; George Kralovansky; Sean Gill; Harriet Steel Durkes; Kristy Huffman; Rori Pitts; Tia Schellstede; Keith Sicat

Original release
- Network: A&E
- Release: January 8, 2008 – December 22, 2012

Parking Wars is an American reality television series that aired on the A&E television network from 2008 to 2012. The program followed parking enforcement officers as they engaged in ticketing, "booting", towing and releasing vehicles back to their owners, as part of their parking violation enforcement duties.

The show began airing on January 8, 2008. The 7th and final season premiered on October 6, 2012. The final episode was aired on December 22, 2012.

== Series overview ==
Season	Episodes	Originally released	
Season	Episodes	First released	Last released
1	16	January 8, 2008	February 26, 2008
2	17	October 15, 2008	December 17, 2008
3	13	October 6, 2009	November 17, 2009
4	13	October 12, 2010	November 23, 2010
5	12	April 16, 2011	June 18, 2011
6	13	February 11, 2012	May 12, 2012
7	19	October 6, 2012	December 22, 2012

== Background ==
The series' original focus was on the employees of the Philadelphia Parking Authority (PPA) and their daily work – ticketing, "booting" (via wheel clamp) and towing vehicles, as well as dealing with issues that arise with vehicle owners when they try to retrieve their vehicles from the impound lots. The show also includes footage of vehicle owners interacting with parking enforcement officers on the street when their vehicles are ticketed, booted or towed.

Each episode consists of three segments, shown either in chronological order of a car entering the PPA violation system (ticket, boot/tow, impound) or reverse chronological order. Booting a car usually requires the PPA employee to snap on a device, locking the mechanism of the front wheel so that it will not be able to move. Sometimes, attaching a boot to a car is difficult because of the size of the wheels. The procedure can often be unnerving because it is a race against time before the owner of the vehicle returns.

Many of the booting segments feature the favorite team of Steve (better known by his last name, Garfield), a longtime PPA employee and self-professed "gadget geek", and his partner Sherry (who has "the fastest fingers on the Eastern Seaboard", according to her partner) as they travel on their assigned beats to track down vehicles with three tickets or more, all at least six months old, and "boot" them so that their owners cannot drive away until they pay the outstanding fines.

One of the PPA tow truck drivers featured in the series, Martin, died shortly before the show's debut due to heart complications. The show's official page at aetv.com has a section dedicated to his memory.

== Production ==
The first five seasons of Parking Wars were filmed on location in Philadelphia. Beginning in the third season, Detroit's MPD (Municipal Parking Department) was added as a location as well, in addition to the PPA. Beginning in season 6, the parking enforcement unit of Providence, Rhode Island, is featured. In season 6, the show added Staten Island and North Hempstead, New York, and Trenton, New Jersey, to its list of filming locations.

The series was based on a 2001 documentary of the same name about the PPA, produced for A&E and Britain's Channel 5, about a day in the life of the PPA, from morning to late night, taped in April 2001. The documentary featured off-screen narration by Daniel Jenkins, as well as all elements of the PPA's operation – ticketing, booting, impounding, towing, adjudication and auctioning.

When the series debuted seven years later in 2008, the narrator was dropped in favor of the employees telling the stories themselves, each episode had three separate segments, and the adjudication and auctioning aspects were no longer featured (with towing only featured very occasionally). Some of the staffers that appeared in the documentary, such as boot crew member Steve Garfield, would later be seen in the series. When this documentary was rebroadcast after the start of the series, it was listed in television listings as "The Lost Pilot".

== Supplemental articles ==
- New York Times: City Finds a Reality Show Hard to Watch, June 22, 2009.
- New York Times: New York City Cracks Down on Tickets Left Unpaid, December 3, 2010.
