= Russell Letterman =

American politician

Russell P. Letterman

Member of the Pennsylvania House of Representatives from the 76th district
- In office January 5, 1971 – February 8, 1990
- Preceded by: Max Bossert
- Succeeded by: Mike Hanna

Personal details
- Born: March 8, 1933 Milesburg, Pennsylvania
- Died: February 8, 1990 (aged 56) State College, Pennsylvania
- Party: Democratic

Russell P. Letterman (March 8, 1933 – February 8, 1990) was a Democratic member of the Pennsylvania House of Representatives.
