= Louise Bishop =

American politician (born 1933)

Louise Williams Bishop

Member of the Pennsylvania House of Representatives from the 192nd district
- In office January 3, 1989 – December 16, 2015
- Preceded by: Chaka Fattah
- Succeeded by: Lynwood Savage

Personal details
- Born: June 27, 1933 (age 93) Cairo, Georgia, U.S.
- Party: Democratic

Louise E. Williams Bishop (born June 27, 1933) was a Democratic member of the Pennsylvania House of Representatives, District 192.

Bishop has been heavily involved in radio broadcasting for many years and she was credited with keeping Philadelphia calm following the assassination of Martin Luther King Jr. in April 1968. She was inducted into the Broadcast Pioneers of Philadelphia Hall of Fame on November 22, 2013.

As "Lois Lane", Bishop released the single "Turn me loose" on Wand Records in 1964.

She resigned her seat on Dec 16, 2015 amid corruption allegations.
