= Carrie DelRosso =

American politician

Member of the Pennsylvania House of Representatives from the 33rd district
- In office January 5, 2021 – November 30, 2022
- Preceded by: Frank Dermody
- Succeeded by: Mandy Steele

Personal details
- Born: 1975 or 1976 (age 50–51) Scranton, Pennsylvania, U.S.
- Party: Republican
- Children: 3
- Education: University of Pittsburgh
- Website: carrielewisdelrosso.com

Carrie A. Lewis DelRosso is an American politician and businesswoman who served one term as a member of the Pennsylvania House of Representatives, representing the 33rd district from 2021 to 2022. She was the Republican nominee for Lieutenant Governor of Pennsylvania in the 2022 election, running on the party's general election ticket with Doug Mastriano.

== Early life and education ==
DelRosso was born in Scranton, Pennsylvania. She graduated from West Scranton High School and studied at the University of Pittsburgh.

== Career before politics ==
From 1996 to 2006, DelRosso worked as an insurance specialist for the University of Pittsburgh Medical Center and currently runs a public relations company. She was hired by the Riverview School District as a public relations consultant in 2016, and left that position at the end of 2019, citing her other PR roles for the Penn Hills, Verona, and Plum school districts.

== Political career ==
In 2017, DelRosso was elected to serve on the Oakmont Borough Council and was sworn in on January 2, 2018. In November 2020, she won the election to represent Pennsylvania's 33rd House district, beating then-Pennsylvania House Minority Leader Frank Dermody 51% to 49%. Following the election she resigned from the Oakmont Borough Council; her resignation was made effective on December 31, 2020.

Following redistricting of the state House maps, DelRosso would have been unable to run again in the 33rd district. On February 2, 2022, DelRosso announced she would be seeking the Republican nomination for Lieutenant Governor of Pennsylvania in the 2022 election. She ran televised advertisements statewide to gain recognition and later won the nomination with 25.66% of the vote.

DelRosso appeared on the general election ballot alongside gubernatorial nominee Pennsylvania State Senator Doug Mastriano. DelRosso was not Mastriano's endorsed candidate for lieutenant governor in primary election; Mastriano supported candidate Teddy Daniels who received 12% of the vote. Despite not being Mastriano's preferred candidate, DelRosso said she would work with Mastriano on initiatives such as election integrity, school choice, and energy policy. She and Mastriano ran against the Democratic nominees for governor and lieutenant governor, Pennsylvania Attorney General Josh Shapiro and Pennsylvania State Representative Austin Davis, respectively, and lost on November 8. Following the election loss, DelRosso registered as a lobbyist for the law firm Buchanan Ingersoll & Rooney PC.

In July 2023, Pittsburgh Mayor Ed Gainey nominated DelRosso to a seat on the city's newly created infrastructure commission. However, Gainey pulled DelRosso's nomination after members of the Pittsburgh City Council expressed reservations over DelRosso's past policy positions, including a bill vetoed by Governor Tom Wolf that would have prohibited transgender college athletes from competing in the sport of their gender identity.

== Political positions ==
DelRosso has said she is "anti-establishment". She opposed mandates related to the COVID-19 pandemic. She has promoted mail-in and absentee ballots. DelRosso criticized the 2021 United States Capitol attack for its lawlessness and violence.

== Electoral history ==
2017 Oakmont Borough Council Republican primary election
| Party | Candidate | Votes | % |
|---|---|---|---|
| Republican | Laurie J. Saxon | 328 | 28.85 |
| Republican | Justin Lokay | 313 | 27.53 |
| Republican | Carrie DelRosso | 265 | 23.31 |
| Republican | Nicholas I. Armstrong | 228 | 20.05 |
| Write-in | | 3 | 0.26 |
| Total votes | | 1,137 | 100.00 |

2017 Oakmont Borough Council election
| Party | Candidate | Votes | % |
|---|---|---|---|
| Democratic | Leah Powers | 1,169 | 15.49 |
| Republican | Justin Lokay | 1,085 | 14.38 |
| Republican | Carrie DelRosso | 1,054 | 13.97 |
| Democratic | Patricia Friday | 1,039 | 13.77 |
| Democratic | David Brankley | 1,010 | 13.39 |
| Republican | Laurie J. Saxon | 943 | 12.5 |
| Democratic | Jay Weinberg | 688 | 9.12 |
| Republican | Nicholas I. Armstrong | 549 | 7.28 |
| Write-in | | 8 | 0.11 |
| Total votes | | 7,585 | 100.00 |

2020 Pennsylvania House of Representatives election, 33rd District
| Party | Candidate | Votes | % |
|---|---|---|---|
| Republican | Carrie DelRosso | 16,359 | 51.31 |
| Democratic | Frank Dermody (incumbent) | 15,471 | 48.53 |
| Write-in | | 51 | 00.16 |
| Total votes | | 31,881 | 100.00 |

2022 Republican primary, Pennsylvania lieutenant governor
| Party | Candidate | Votes | % |
|---|---|---|---|
| Republican | Carrie DelRosso | 318,537 | 25.66 |
| Republican | Richard Saccone | 195,171 | 15.72 |
| Republican | Theodore Daniels | 150,749 | 12.14 |
| Republican | Clarice D. Schillinger | 147,705 | 11.90 |
| Republican | Jeffrey H. Coleman | 125,059 | 10.07 |
| Republican | James E. Jones | 113,183 | 9.12 |
| Republican | Russell H. Diamond | 73,751 | 5.94 |
| Republican | John A. Brown | 58,961 | 4.75 |
| Republican | Christopher C. Frye, Jr. | 58,403 | 4.70 |
| Total votes | | 1,241,519 | 100.00 |

2022 Pennsylvania gubernatorial election
| Party | Candidate | Votes | % |
|---|---|---|---|
| Democratic | Josh Shapiro; Austin Davis | 3,031,137 | 56.49 |
| Republican | Doug Mastriano; Carrie DelRosso | 2,238,477 | 41.71 |
| Libertarian | Matt Hackenburg; Tim McMaster | 51,611 | 0.96 |
| Green | Christina DiGiulio; Michael Bagdes-Canning | 24,436 | 0.46 |
| Keystone | Joe Soloski; Nicole Shultz | 20,518 | 0.38 |
| Total votes | | 5,366,179 | 100.00 |

Party political offices
| Preceded by Jeff Bartos | Republican nominee for Lieutenant Governor of Pennsylvania; 2022 | Succeeded by Jason Richey |
