= Solebury, Pennsylvania =

Unincorporated community in Pennsylvania, US

- Unincorporated community
- Location within Pennsylvania
- Coordinates: 40°22′50″N 75°00′30″W
- Country: United States
- State: Pennsylvania
- County: Bucks
- Township: Solebury
- Elevation: 381 ft (116 m)
- Time zone: UTC-5 (Eastern (EST))
  - Summer (DST): UTC-4 (EDT)
- ZIP Code: 18963
- Area codes: 215, 267 and 445
- GNIS feature ID: 1187982

Solebury is an unincorporated community in Solebury Township in Bucks County, Pennsylvania, United States. Solebury is located at the intersection of Pennsylvania Route 263, Sugan Road, and Phillips Mill Road.

== Notable person ==
- Helen Tai, former Pennsylvania state legislator
