= Dan A. Surra =

American politician

Member of the Pennsylvania House of Representatives from the 75th district
- In office January 1, 1991 – November 30, 2008
- Preceded by: James T. Distler
- Succeeded by: Matt Gabler

Personal details
- Born: June 19, 1953 (age 73) Ridgway, Pennsylvania
- Party: Democratic
- Spouse: Victoria
- Education: Penn State University
- Occupation: Educator

Dan A. Surra (born June 19, 1953) is a Democratic politician who represented the 75th District in the Pennsylvania House of Representatives from 1991 to 2008. He served as Majority Caucus Administrator. He was defeated for re-election in 2008 by Republican Matt Gabler.
