= Ronald Donatucci =

American politician (1948–2020)

Ronald R. Donatucci

Register of Wills of Philadelphia
- In office January 8, 1980 – January 6, 2020
- Preceded by: Thomas A. Leonard
- Succeeded by: Tracey Gordon

Member of the Pennsylvania House of Representatives from the 185th district
- In office 1977 – January 7, 1980
- Preceded by: Anthony DiDonato
- Succeeded by: Robert Donatucci

Personal details
- Born: January 21, 1948 Philadelphia, Pennsylvania, U.S.
- Died: November 4, 2020 (aged 72) Philadelphia, Pennsylvania, U.S.
- Party: Democratic
- Spouse(s): Debra Jane Cava; Stephanie Leva
- Relations: Robert Donatucci (brother); Maria Donatucci (sister-in-law)
- Children: 3
- Education: Temple University (BA); University of Baltimore (JD)

Ronald R. Donatucci (January 21, 1948 – November 4, 2020) was an American lawyer, real estate agent, and politician who served as the Register of Wills of Philadelphia from 1980 to 2020 and as a member of the Pennsylvania House of Representatives from 1977 to 1980. He was a member of the Democratic Party.

== Early life and education ==
Donatucci was born in Philadelphia, Pennsylvania on January 21, 1948, one of five children to Thomas and Yolanda (nee D'Amico) Donatucci. His father, Thomas, ran a supermarket and was the leader of the 26th Ward Democratic Committee in South Philadelphia, and later was a deputy to Pennsylvania Auditor General Bob Casey Sr., who served as pallbearer at his funeral in 1970. He graduated from Central High School, later earning a bachelor's degree in political science from Temple University in 1970 and a J.D. from the University of Baltimore School of Law in 1974.

== Legal and early political career ==
Donatucci's career began just after he graduated from Temple University when he worked as an auditor in the Philadelphia field office of the Pennsylvania Auditor General under Bob Casey Sr. In 1972 he was hired to the City Solicitor's office and in 1974 as the chief of enforcement of the Department of Licensing and Inspections. After obtaining his J.D., he worked as a counsel for the Philadelphia Parking Authority. The Philadelphia Inquirer considered these hires as an example of the patronage politics that Donatucci would later practice in a 1994 article. In 1974 he started practicing law and would also start serving as leader of the 26th Ward Democratic Committee, a position his father held and one that he would hold for 46 years until his death in 2020.

In 1976, Donatucci was elected as a Democrat to the Pennsylvania House of Representatives, serving the 185th district in South Philadelphia for two terms until his resignation on January 7, 1980 upon his accession as the Register of Wills of Philadelphia. He was succeeded by his brother, Robert Donatucci. A 1977 Philadelphia magazine article described him as being "very tight with Rizzo" and a potential "next big Italian power broker" in South Philadelphia.

== Register of Wills ==
Donatucci was elected as the Register of Wills of Philadelphia in 1979, facing Jack Collins in the Democratic primary, and defeating Republican Vito Canuso by a 2 to 1 margin in the general election. He claimed that Martin Weinberg, City Solicitor of then Mayor Frank Rizzo, encouraged him to run. He would go on to be reelected nine more times, often running unopposed in primaries, serving for ten terms and 40 years in that role.

The Register of Wills office, which oversees marriage licenses, estate records, and wills, was often seen and criticized as a patronage office for the politically connected, and Donatucci was reportedly often proud of conducting the patronage. In a 1994 Philadelphia Inquirer article, he stated that patronage is the "most efficient" way to run government and that it "works in our office". By that year, he had hired Democratic ward leaders and committee people from 32 of the 66 city wards. The article alleged that he had used his position to benefit financially through real estate transactions, and the newspaper called him the "Prince of Patronage". In 2015, the office had included six ward leaders (including himself) and 21 committee people out of 63 employees.

In the 2016 United States presidential election, Donatucci supported Hillary Clinton in the Democratic primary and served as a superdelegate to the Democratic National Convention from Pennsylvania.

Running for an 11th term in 2019, Donatucci was defeated in the Democratic primary by deputy City Commissioner Tracey Gordon in a tight race, losing by 4 percent. The Philadelphia Inquirer would later call it a "halfhearted" campaign, owing to the fallout of his son's death.

== Personal life ==
In addition to his political and legal career, Donatucci served as president of board of directors of City Trusts, on the Board of Trustees of Temple University, and chair of the Board of Wills Eye Hospital. He often went by the nickname "Ron-Don" at City Hall.

Donatucci was married to Debra Jane Cava, with whom he had two sons, Ronald Jr. and Michael, and later married Stephanie Leva, with whom he had a daughter, Ava Marie. He has two grandchildren. His son, Michael, committed suicide in 2016 at age 30.

Donatucci died after a long illness on November 4, 2020 at age 72. He is interred at Holy Cross Cemetery in Yeadon, Pennsylvania.
