= William Wachob =

American politician

Member of the Pennsylvania House of Representatives from the 75th district
- In office 1979–1984
- Preceded by: William Renwick
- Succeeded by: James Distler

Personal details
- Born: April 8, 1953 (age 73) Ridgway, Pennsylvania
- Party: Democratic

William Wachob (born April 8, 1953) is a former Democratic member of the Pennsylvania House of Representatives.
