= James Distler =

American politician

James T. Distler

Member of the Pennsylvania House of Representatives from the 75th district
- In office 1985–1990
- Preceded by: William Wachob
- Succeeded by: Dan A. Surra

Personal details
- Born: May 22, 1934 St. Marys, Pennsylvania
- Died: March 31, 2015 (aged 80) St. Marys, Pennsylvania
- Party: Republican
- Spouse: Joan Distler (Married 1958)
- Children: 4. James K, Francis, Thomas & Diane

James T. Distler (May 22, 1934 – March 31, 2015) was a Republican member of the Pennsylvania House of Representatives.
