= Joseph Bonetto =

American politician (1921–1988)

Joseph F. Bonetto

Member of the Pennsylvania House of Representatives from the 33rd district
- In office January 7, 1969 – November 30, 1976
- Preceded by: District created
- Succeeded by: Roger Duffy

Member of the Pennsylvania House of Representatives from the Allegheny County district
- In office January 5, 1965 – November 30, 1968

Personal details
- Born: April 20, 1921
- Died: February 18, 1988 (aged 66)
- Party: Democratic

Joseph F. Bonetto (April 20, 1921 – February 18, 1988) was a Democratic member of the Pennsylvania House of Representatives.
