= Matthew Coppolino =

American politician

Matthew F. Coppolino

Member of the Pennsylvania House of Representatives from the 185th district
- In office 1969–1972
- Preceded by: District created
- Succeeded by: Frank Vacca

Member of the Pennsylvania House of Representatives from the Philadelphia County district
- In office 1967–1968

Personal details
- Born: October 16, 1929 Philadelphia, Pennsylvania
- Died: June 7, 2000 (aged 70) Philadelphia, Pennsylvania
- Party: Republican

Matthew F. Coppolino (October 16, 1929 – June 7, 2000) was a Republican member of the Pennsylvania House of Representatives.
