= Roger F. Duffy =

American politician (1925–2007)

Member of the Pennsylvania House of Representatives from the 33rd district
- In office January 4, 1977 – November 30, 1988
- Preceded by: Joseph Bonetto
- Succeeded by: Ted Kedrich

Personal details
- Born: November 19, 1925 Pittsburgh, Pennsylvania, United States
- Died: March 31, 2007 (aged 81) Shelby, North Carolina, United States
- Party: Democratic

Roger F. Duffy (November 19, 1925 – March 31, 2007) is a former Democratic member of the Pennsylvania House of Representatives.
