= Frank Dermody =

American politician (born 1951)

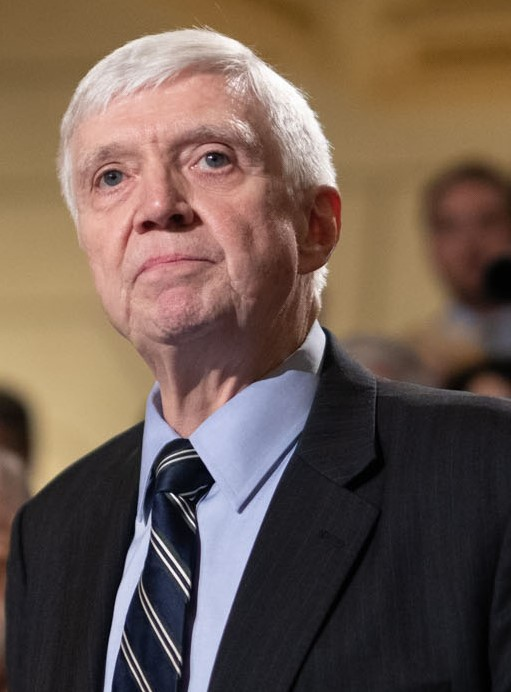

Minority Leader of the Pennsylvania House of Representatives
- In office January 4, 2011 – November 30, 2020
- Deputy: Mike Hanna; Jordan A. Harris
- Preceded by: Sam Smith
- Succeeded by: Joanna McClinton

Majority Whip of the Pennsylvania House of Representatives
- In office December 19, 2009 – November 30, 2010
- Leader: Todd Eachus
- Preceded by: Bill DeWeese
- Succeeded by: Stan Saylor

Member of the Pennsylvania House of Representatives from the 33rd district
- In office January 1, 1991 – November 30, 2020
- Preceded by: Ted Kondrich
- Succeeded by: Carrie DelRosso

Personal details
- Born: May 29, 1951 (age 75) Scranton, Pennsylvania, U.S.
- Party: Democratic
- Spouse: Debra Dermody
- Education: Columbia University (BA); Indiana University Bloomington (JD)
- Website: Official website

Frank Dermody (born May 29, 1951) is an American politician. He was a Democratic member of the Pennsylvania House of Representatives, representing the 33rd district from 1991 until 2020. Dermody served as House Democratic Leader from 2011 until 2020.

== Background ==
One of five children, Dermody was born in Scranton, Pennsylvania, and raised in nearby Clarks Summit. His father, a demolition expert who worked in the coal mines, died when Frank was 7. To support the family, his mother worked various jobs, including with Capitol Records, the Social Security Administration, and the Pennsylvania Department of Transportation.

After graduating from Abington Heights High School, he received a scholarship to play football at Columbia University in New York City. He earned a Bachelor of Arts degree in history from Columbia in 1973. For the next five years, he worked in sales for two different companies in New York while saving money for law school. He received his Juris Doctor from Indiana University School of Law-Bloomington in 1982.

Dermody then returned to Pennsylvania, working as an assistant public defender in Harrisburg. He served as assistant district attorney in Allegheny County for five years. During his tenure in the district attorney's office, he was appointed by Governor Bob Casey in 1989 to fill an unexpired term as district justice for Oakmont and Verona, which he did for seven months.

Dermody also worked as a legal advisor to Allegheny County's district justices, an instructor at the Community College of Allegheny County, and a faculty member of the Pennsylvania Bar Institute for Continuing Legal Education.

== State representative ==
In 1990, Dermody ran for the Pennsylvania House of Representatives in the 33rd Legislative District. His district is located in northeastern Allegheny County, including Brackenridge, Cheswick, East Deer, Fawn, Frazer, Harmar, Harrison, Indiana, Oakmont, part of Plum, Springdale, Tarentum, and West Deer. In the Democratic primary, he faced Arlene S. Loeffler, the president of the Riverview School Board. He won with 2,870 votes, or 53%, against Loeffler's 2,524 votes, or 47%.

In the general election, Dermody faced one-term Republican incumbent Ted V. Kondrich. The criminal justice system, education, and the environment were regarded as the top issues of the campaign. Dermody ultimately defeated Kondrich, receiving 9,082 votes to Kondrich's 8,430. He has been re-elected every two years since.

Dermody was chairman of the Subcommittee on Courts in the Judiciary Committee from 1991 to 2006, and served on the Pennsylvania Commission on Sentencing from 1991 to 2010, including 14 years as commission chairman. In 1994, he was selected by House leaders to lead the investigation into charges against Supreme Court Justice Rolf Larsen, serving as a key House manager (prosecutor) in the impeachment trial that led to Larsen's eventual removal.

He served as chairman of the Allegheny County's House Democratic delegation (1994–2006) and as caucus secretary (2006–2008). In 2009, he was elected Majority Whip, the second-highest position for his party in the House. In late 2010, he was elected Democratic floor leader on November 17, 2010, after incumbent Todd Eachus was defeated in his bid for re-election.

Dermody was defeated for reelection in 2020 by Carrie DelRosso.

== Personal life ==
Dermody resides in Oakmont with his wife, Debra (née Hewetson) Dermody, who was his classmate in law school. They have two children, Frank and Cara.

Pennsylvania House of Representatives
Preceded by Sam Smith	Minority Leader of the Pennsylvania House of Representatives; 2011–2020	Succeeded by Joanna McClinton
