= Morgan Cephas =

American politician (born 1984)

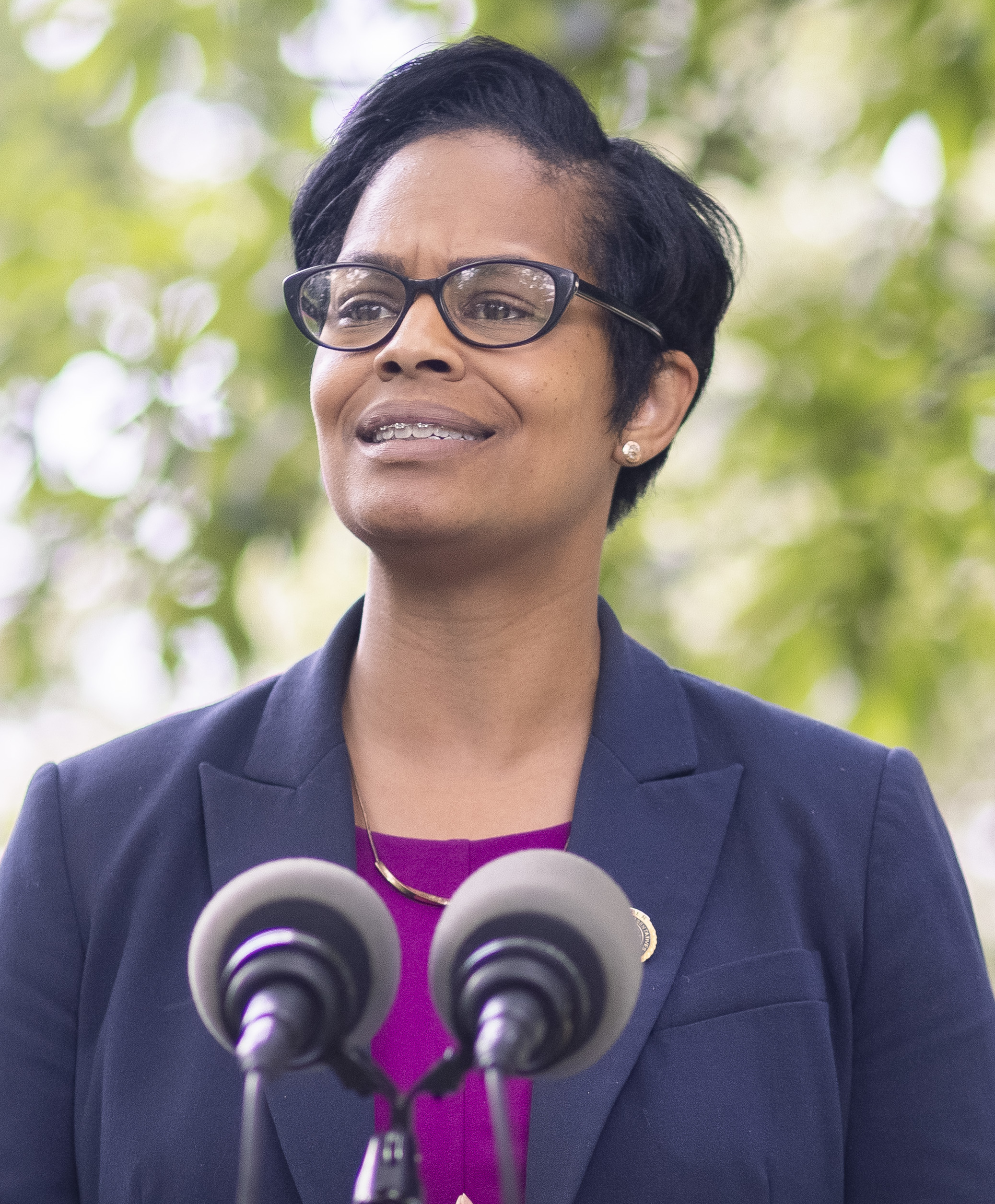
- Morgan Cephas at a 2021 press conference

Member of the Pennsylvania House of Representatives from the 192nd district
- Incumbent
- Assumed office January 3, 2017
- Preceded by: Lynwood Savage

Personal details
- Born: August 30, 1984 (age 41) Philadelphia, Pennsylvania, U.S.
- Party: Democratic
- Education: University of Virginia (BA)

Morgan Beth Cephas (born August 30, 1984) is an American politician serving as a member of the Pennsylvania House of Representatives, representing the 192nd House district in Philadelphia, Pennsylvania.

== Early life and education ==
Cephas was born and raised in West Philadelphia and is a graduate of Central High School from the class of 2002. She then graduated with a degree in political science from the University of Virginia in 2006.

== Career ==
Cephas previously served as the Deputy Chief of Staff to Philadelphia City Councilman Curtis Jones, Jr. before running for the state legislature.

Cephas was first elected to the Pennsylvania House of Representatives in 2016 after defeating incumbent Rep. Lynwood Savage in the Democratic primary. Running unopposed, Cephas was re-elected to a second term in the House in the 2018 general election on November 6, 2018.

Cephas was appointed as deputy whip of the Pennsylvania House of Representatives for the 2021–2022 session and to PennVEST in 2021. In 2024, she was elected as a delegate to the 2024 Democratic National Convention.

Cephas announced she would run for Pennsylvania's 3rd congressional district seat after Dwight Evans announced his retirement.
