= Mike Hanna =

American politician

Michael K. Hanna Sr.

Member of the Pennsylvania House of Representatives from the 76th district
- In office January 1, 1991 – January 1, 2019
- Preceded by: Russell Letterman
- Succeeded by: Stephanie Borowicz

Democratic Whip of the Pennsylvania House of Representatives
- In office January 4, 2011 – January 1, 2019
- Preceded by: Frank Dermody
- Succeeded by: Jordan A. Harris

Personal details
- Born: August 25, 1953 (age 73) Lock Haven, Pennsylvania, United States
- Party: Democratic
- Spouse: Susan Hanna
- Children: 2
- Education: Lock Haven University; University of Pittsburgh
- Occupation: Lawyer

Michael K. Hanna Sr. (born August 25, 1953) is an American politician from Pennsylvania who served as a Democratic member of the Pennsylvania House of Representatives for the 76th district from January 1, 1991 to January 1, 2019. On February 12, 2018 he announced his retirement from public office. He served as Minority Whip in the legislature from 2011 until his retirement. Hanna was Majority Chairman of The House Agriculture and Rural Affairs Committee from 2007 until 2010, shepherding the passage of PA Food Safety Bill and updates to PA Dog Law.
