= W. Max Bossert =

American football coach & politician (1906–1990)

Member of the Pennsylvania House of Representatives from the 76th district
- In office January 7, 1969 – November 30, 1970
- Preceded by: District Created
- Succeeded by: Russell Letterman

Member of the Pennsylvania House of Representatives from the Clinton County district
- In office January 3, 1961 – November 30, 1968

Personal details
- Born: July 9, 1906 Mill Hall, Pennsylvania, U.S.
- Died: May 15, 1990 (aged 83) Beech Creek Township, Pennsylvania, U.S.
- Party: Republican

Willard Max Bossert (July 9, 1906 – May 15, 1990) was an American football coach and Republican member of the Pennsylvania House of Representatives. He served as the head football coach at the State Teacher's College in Lock Haven—now Lock Haven University of Pennsylvania—from 1940 to 1942 and again in 1945, compiling a record of 14–12–3. Bossert was also the school's head wrestling and boxing coach during that time. He died on May 15, 1990, at the age of 83.
