= Robert Donatucci =

American politician

Member of the Pennsylvania House of Representatives from the 185th district
- In office April 8, 1980 – November 9, 2010
- Preceded by: Ronald Donatucci
- Succeeded by: Maria Donatucci, his widow

Personal details
- Born: May 3, 1952 Philadelphia, Pennsylvania
- Died: November 9, 2010 (aged 58) Philadelphia, Pennsylvania
- Party: Democratic
- Spouse: Maria Donatucci (m. 1984–2010)
- Relations: Ronald Donatucci (brother)

Robert Donatucci (May 3, 1952 – November 9, 2010) was a Democratic member of the Pennsylvania House of Representatives, representing the 185th Legislative District from 1980 until his death in 2010.

A native of Philadelphia, Donatucci graduated from Bishop Neumann High School in 1970 and from Temple University in 1974. He was first elected in a special election on March 11, 1980, to succeed his brother Ronald Donatucci, who resigned to become register of wills of Philadelphia County. As a state representative, he served as chair of the House Liquor Control Committee.
