= Pennsylvania House of Representatives, District 192 =

American legislative district

Pennsylvania's 192nd State House of Representatives district
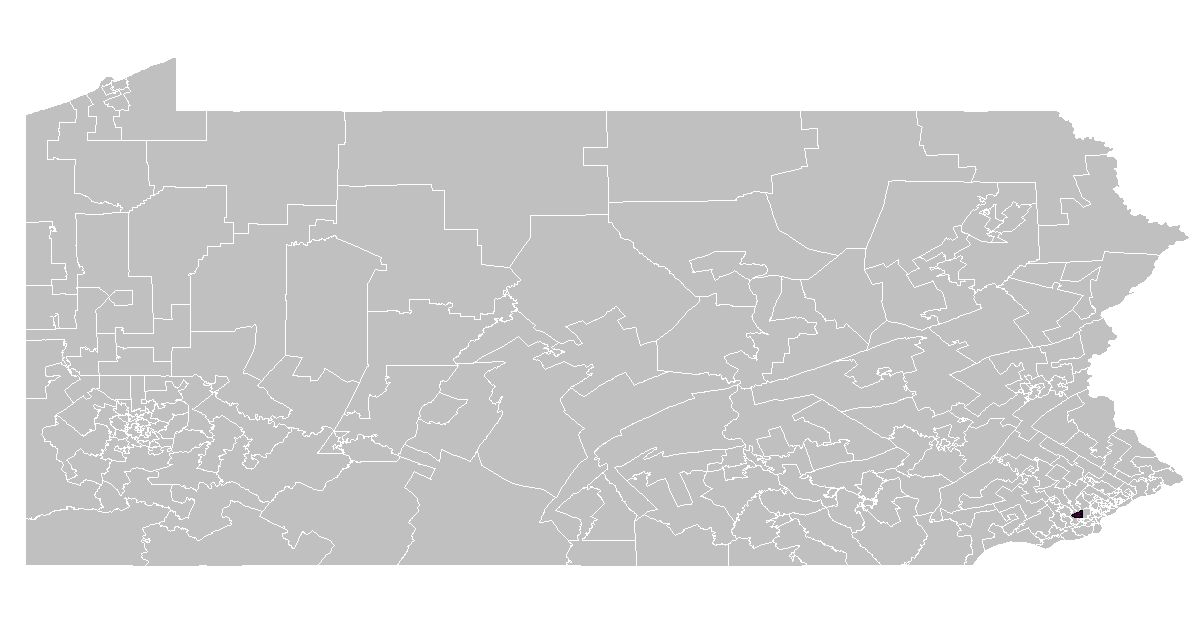
Representative
Morgan Cephas; D–Philadelphia

The 192nd Pennsylvania House of Representatives District is located in Philadelphia County and includes the following areas:

- Ward 04 [PART, Divisions 02, 03, 04, 05, 06, 09, 10, 11, 14, 15, 16, 17, 18 and 21]
- Ward 34
- Ward 52 [PART, Divisions 05, 14, 15, 16, 17, 18, 19, 20, 22, 23, 24, 25, 26 and 27]

== Representatives ==
Representative	Party	Years	District home	Note
Prior to 1969, seats were apportioned by county.
Anita Palermo Kelly	Democrat	1969 – 1978		
Nicholas A. Pucciarelli	Democrat	1979 – 1982		
Chaka Fatta	Democrat	1983 – 1988		
Louise Williams Bishop	Democrat	1989 – 2015		
Lynwood Savage	Democrat	2016 – 2017		
Morgan Cephas	Democrat	2017–Present		
