= Helen Tai =

American politician

Member of the Pennsylvania House of Representatives from the 178th district
- In office June 5, 2018 – December 1, 2018
- Preceded by: Scott Petri
- Succeeded by: Wendi Thomas

Personal details
- Born: Michigan
- Party: Democratic
- Spouse: John McDevitt
- Education: University of Michigan; Penn State University
- Occupation: Businesswoman
- Website: https://www.helentai.com

Helen Tai (戴怡平) is a former member of the Pennsylvania House of Representatives from the 178th Legislative District. She was elected in a Special Election on Tuesday, May 15, 2018 to serve out the remainder of Scott Petri's term. She previously served on the Solebury Township Board of Supervisors. However, Tai was later ousted from her seat after losing in the general election held on November 6, 2018.

== Career ==
Prior to being elected to the House, Helen had over 25 years of experience and began her professional career as a biostatistician with Ortho Pharmaceuticals, G.D. Searle, and Lorex Pharmaceuticals. At Information Resources she was associate director of statistical projections and sampling. Later, Helen held senior positions in Johnson & Johnson's Consumer Products Division. Helen also owned two companies, enabling innovation and Fearless Heart Aikido where she trains in self defense as a fourth degree black belt.

In 2018, Tai defeated Republican Wendi Thomas in a special election held on May 15 of that year. She then lost to Thomas in the general election held on November 6, 2018.

== Personal ==
A graduate of Penn State University (MS), Tai also earned a Bachelor of Arts degree from University of Michigan in Ann Arbor, Michigan, and has been a resident of Solebury since 2000 where she continues to reside with her husband.
