= Maria Donatucci =

American politician

Member of the Pennsylvania House of Representatives from the 185th district
- In office February 15, 2011 – November 30, 2020
- Preceded by: Robert Donatucci
- Succeeded by: Regina Young

Personal details
- Born: 1954 (age 71–72) South Philadelphia, Philadelphia, Pennsylvania, U.S.
- Party: Democratic
- Spouse: Robert Donatucci (m. 1984; died 2010)
- Relations: Ronald Donatucci (brother-in-law)
- Education: Philadelphia College of Art; Philadelphia Community College; Pierce Junior College; Temple University

Maria Donatucci (born 1954) is an American politician who served as a member of the Pennsylvania House of Representatives from the 185th district, which includes parts of Delaware and Philadelphia counties. She was elected in February 2011.

== Early life and education ==
Donatucci was born and raised in South Philadelphia and is the only child of stand-up comedian Phil Jaye and Jean Patelmo. She graduated from Philadelphia High School for Girls in 1972 and attended Philadelphia College of Art, Philadelphia Community College, Pierce Junior College, and Temple University.

== Career ==
Donatucci has worked in various positions for the Philadelphia Redevelopment Authority during the 1970s and the 1980s, as well as working as an adjudicator for Philadelphia's Bureau of Administrative Adjudication. She has also served as a board member for the Lions Club, from which she received the Melvin Jones Fellow Award for Outstanding Community Service in 2007.

=== Pennsylvania House ===
Donatucci was elected to the House in 2011 in a special election after the death of her husband, Robert.

She served on the Aging & Adult Older Services, Urban Affairs, and Veterans Affairs & Emergency Preparedness committees in the House.

=== Election results ===
2011 Pennsylvania House of Representatives 185th District special election
Party	Candidate	Votes	%
Democratic	Maria Donatucci	1,843	93.89%
Republican	Lewis Harris, Jr.	120	6.11%
Turnout		1,963	
Democratic hold			

== Personal life ==
In 1984, Donatucci married Robert Donatucci, who was then a state representative from the 185th district. They had two children together, Dierdre and Thomas.

Political offices
Preceded by Robert Donatucci	Member of the Pennsylvania House of Representatives from the 185th District; 2011 – 2020	Succeeded by Regina Young
