= Scott Petri =

American politician

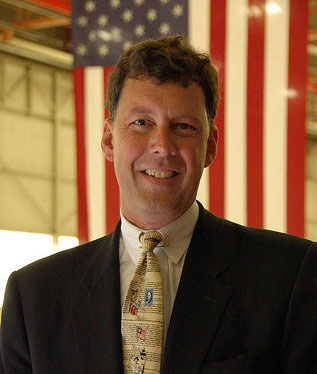

Member of the Pennsylvania House of Representatives from the 178th district
- In office January 7, 2003 – January 2, 2018
- Preceded by: Roy Reinard
- Succeeded by: Helen Tai

Personal details
- Born: 1960 (age 65–66) Abington, Pennsylvania, U.S.
- Party: Republican
- Education: Washington and Jefferson College, Villanova University School of Law
- Occupation: Attorney

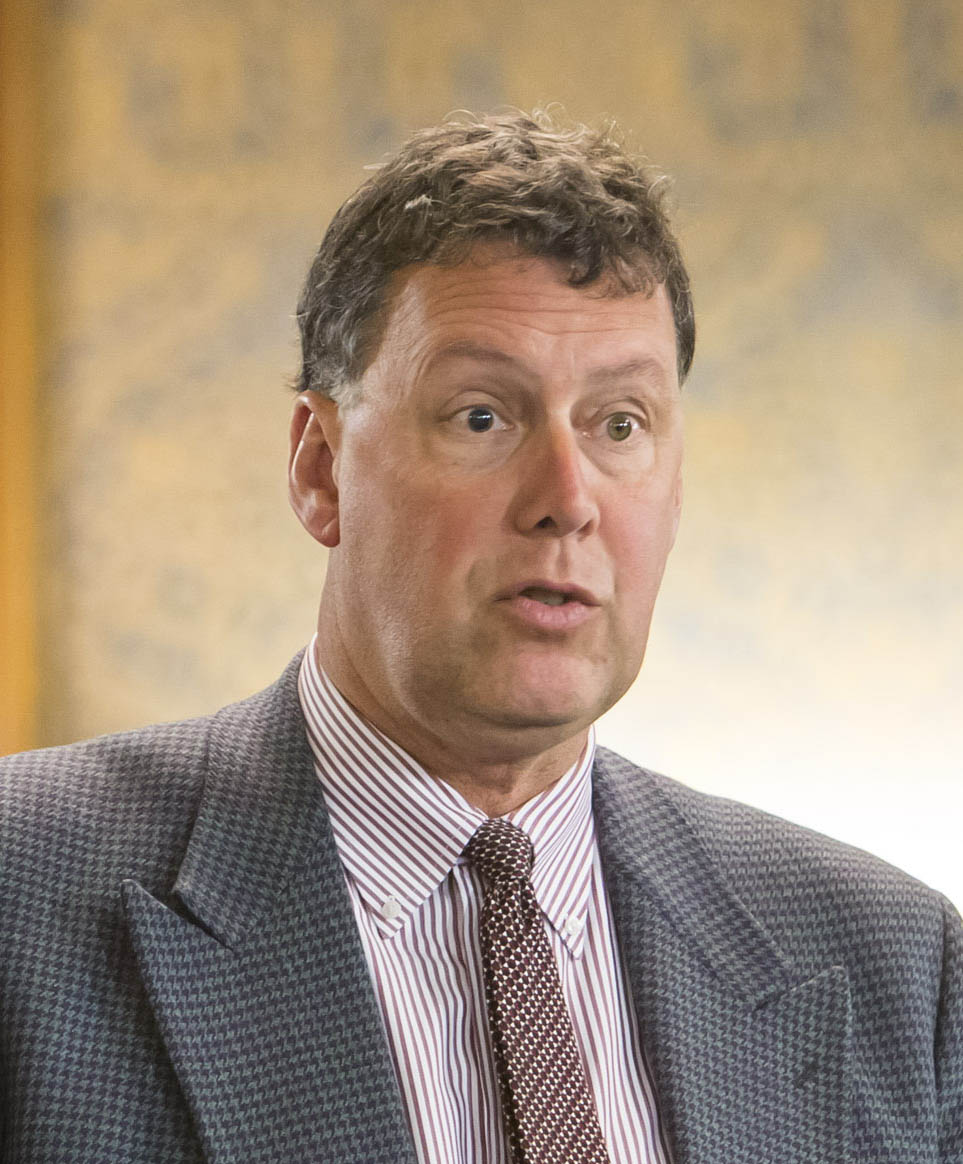

Scott Petri (born 1960) is an American politician who was a member of the Pennsylvania House of Representatives from the 178th Legislative District. He was the Chairman of House Urban Affairs and the House Ethics Committee. He also served as a member of the Liquor Control Committees. Petri served as executive director of the Philadelphia Parking Authority from 2017 until he was abruptly ousted in 2021.

== Career ==
Prior to being elected to the House, Petri was a practicing attorney, he served as counsel to Upper Makefield Township and New Britain. He also served on the Upper Makefield Township planning commission and as solicitor to the township.

In 2002, Petri defeated Philadelphia sportscaster Carl Cherkin to succeed retiring Rep. Roy Reinard. He has been re-elected to each succeeding session of the House.

Petri filed his Statement of Candidacy with the Federal Election Commission in October 2015 for the PA-8 2016 Congressional Race to succeed fellow Republican Michael G. Fitzpatrick, who was retiring. Petri subsequently dropped out of the congressional race after Republicans successfully recruited Mike Fitzpatrick's younger brother, Brian Fitzpatrick, to leave his job as a special agent for the Federal Bureau of Investigation in California to move back to Bucks County in order to run for Congress.

In 2017, Petri resigned from his seat in the State House when he was named the executive director of the PPA. After four years at PPA, Petri was abruptly ousted in 2021 by the PPA board.

== Personal ==
A graduate of Villanova University School of Law (1985), Petri also earned a Bachelor of Arts degree cum laude from Washington and Jefferson College (1982) in Washington, Pennsylvania, and is a graduate of Downingtown Senior High School.

He resides in New Hope, Pennsylvania with his wife and son.

At 6'8", Petri was the tallest member of the General Assembly until Lou Schmitt, who stands at 6’9”, was elected to represent the 79th District in 2018.

== Awards ==
2015 - "State Public Official of the Year" by Pennsylvania Bio (statewide trade association representing the life science industry).

2014 - National Federation of Independent Business - "Guardian of Small Business" award.

2012 - "State Public Official of the Year" by Pennsylvania Bio (statewide trade association representing the life science industry).
