= Central Catholic High School (DuBois, Pennsylvania) =

American private, coeducational school

Location
- 200 Central Christian Road; DuBois, (Clearfield County), Pennsylvania 15801; United States; 41°7′9″N 78°47′16″W

Information
- Type: Private, Coeducational
- Religious affiliation: Roman Catholic
- Established: 1961
- Administrator: Gretchen Caruso
- Faculty: 21
- Grades: 9-12
- Student to teacher ratio: 10:1
- Colors: Cardinal, Blue and White
- Team name: Cardinals
- Accreditation: Middle States Association of Colleges and Schools
- Website: duboiscatholic.com

Central Catholic High School is a private, Roman Catholic high school in DuBois, Pennsylvania. It is located in the Roman Catholic Diocese of Erie. Their nickname is the "Cardinals". Their colors are cardinal red, white, and blue.

== Background ==
Central Catholic High School began as St. Catherine’s High School in 1915. It relocated and was renamed Central Christian in 1961. Since then, the school has moved yet again and is now known as DuBois Area Catholic School. It opened in 2002.

The current high school is part of a pre-kindergarten through grade twelve facility with four wings. The elementary area of the school is divided into two separate wings. The younger children’s rooms are in one hallway whereas the older elementary students have their own, nearly identical hallway. In addition to classrooms, this area of the school contains its own library, office, music room, art room and auxiliary gym.

The middle and high school wings are located on the complete opposite side of the building. Similar to the young students being generally separated from the older pupils in the elementary wing, the middle and high school students are mostly separated as well. This area of the building also has its own library, music room, art room, science labs and office.

Also located on campus are a cafeteria, gymnasium, auditorium, chapel, business office, guidance office and at least one computer lab per wing. Every room in the building is equipped to accommodate the advancements of technology.
