= Philadelphia Parking Authority =

Agency of the commonwealth of Pennsylvania

Coordinates: 39.95581°N 75.185357°W

Agency overview
- Formed: January 11, 1950; 76 years ago
- Jurisdiction: Philadelphia
- Headquarters: 701 Market Street, Philadelphia, Pennsylvania 19106
- Agency executive: Richard Lazer, Executive Director
- Parent agency: Commonwealth of Pennsylvania
- Website: www.philapark.org

The Philadelphia Parking Authority (PPA) is an agency of the Commonwealth of Pennsylvania that manages many parking operations for Philadelphia. The PPA was created by the Philadelphia City Council on January 11, 1950, for the purpose of conducting research for management of off-street parking and establishing a permanent, coordinated system of parking facilities in the city. Since then, the PPA's scope has expanded to include parking operations at the Philadelphia International Airport, most street-parking policy enforcement, and regulation and enforcement of taxicabs and limousines.

The PPA's status as an agency of the Commonwealth of Pennsylvania rather than the City of Philadelphia allows for the Republican-controlled state authorities to offer patronage positions in the largely Democratic city. (Note: All local governments in every state is a part of the state government but with limited geographical jurisdiction. Supreme authority over local governments in Pennsylvania rests with the Pennsylvania General Assembly which has decided to prohibit the city from influencing the PPA whilst allowing it to influence other state agencies that are specific to Philadelphia.) The former board chairman Joseph Ashedale has over 10 family members on the agency's payroll. An audit found the PPA's former director, former Republican state representative Scott Petri, did not meet the minimum qualifications of the job description, and his $210,000 salary was above comparable positions in other cities.

The Parking Authority:

- Generates revenue for the city
- Coordinates the parking efforts of public agencies
- Builds and operates public parking facilities
- Does planning and analysis of parking requirements

to provide full parking services for Philadelphia residents, businesses, and visitors.

In popular culture it is the basis of the reality television show Parking Wars.

After three years without a bus terminal with facilities, the PPA in partnership with City of Philadelphia renovated the old Philadelphia Greyhound Terminal and renamed it the Philadelphia Parking Authority Transportation Center, opening in May 2026.

== Policies ==
=== Automated enforcement technology ===
In the 2020s, the PPA expanded its use of automated enforcement technologies, including the use of camera-based systems mounted on public transit vehicles to identify and ticket illegally parked vehicles obstructing bus lanes. The program is intended to improve traffic flow and public transit reliability. The PPA has also implemented automated systems to monitor compliance in designated loading zones and other restricted curbside areas.

=== Off-street parking ===
Originally, the Parking Authority provided parking garages and parking lots, but various city departments were responsible for on-street parking.

=== On-street parking ===
In 1982, Philadelphia City Council was authorized by the Pennsylvania General Assembly to delegate certain powers formerly exercised by various city departments to the Parking Authority. In April 1983, City Council transferred on-street parking responsibilities to the Authority.

Functions transferred from the Streets Department:

- Location, installation and maintenance of all parking meters throughout the city
- Preparation of documentation to modify existing or implement new parking regulations, establishing time limits, loading zones, fire hydrant restrictions, reserved parking for people with disabilities, tow-away zones and residential permit parking
- Preparation of work orders for parking regulations signs

Functions transferred from the Revenue Department:

- Meter Collections

Functions transferred from the Police Department:

- Issuance and processing of parking tickets
- Towing of motor vehicles
- Impoundment of motor vehicles

However, both Police Department officers and SEPTA supervisors can issue parking tickets.

Functions transferred from the Department of Licenses and Inspections:

- Issuance of Loading Zone Permits
- Administration of the Residential Parking Permit Program

A vast majority of revenue for on-street parking for PPA is generated from ticketing violations (63%) and meter parking (29%). Other revenue categories comprise less than 9% of PPA's on-street parking income. The PPA is also considering punishing unlawful parking in bus and bicycle lanes, as well as "Ghost Cars" without license plates.

=== Booting ===
A program to "boot" repeat parking violation offenders was authorized by City Council in 1983.

=== Taxicabs and limousines ===
The Authority was authorized by the General Assembly in July 2004 to regulate taxis and limousines operating in the city, and to adopt and enforce regulations for their operations.

=== Red Light Camera Program ===
The Authority has been authorized by the General Assembly to administer a pilot red light enforcement program. Cameras are installed at intersections with a high accident rate, and fines are imposed for motorists who run red lights. Notices are sent by mail to offenders, based on photos of license plates and the motorists themselves.

=== Inspection Expired ===
Pennsylvania law requires vehicles to display safety and emission inspection stickers, which must be renewed on an annual basis. As these vehicles are parked on a public street, PPA may cite otherwise legally-parked vehicles with expired inspection stickers. Failure to respond to these tickets may result in booting, towing, or the sale at auction of a vehicle repeatedly ticketed for an expired inspection violation.

== Controversies ==
The PPA has been the subject of ongoing public and political debate regarding its enforcement policies and practices. The PPA expanded the use of AI-powered cameras on public transit vehicles. The PPA's scope of regulatory authority has also been challenged in court, including a lawsuit alleging that a law granting the PPA a monopoly over abandoned vehicle towing was unconstitutional. Additionally, city officials and council hearings have scrutinized the PPA's financial transparency and oversight practices.

== Staff ==
=== PPA Executive Staff ===
- Executive Director – Richard Lazer
- Deputy Executive Director – Gabe Roberts
- Deputy Executive Director – Corinne O'Connor

=== Board Members ===
Originally, the Authority's board of directors was controlled by city officials, but the legislature, acting at the initiative of Representative John Perzel, has shifted control to state officials, including the Governor and officers of the legislature.

- Lynette M. Brown-Sow, Chairperson
- Beth C. Grossman
- Patricia M. Furlong
- Alfred W. Taubenberger
- Obra S. Kernodle, IV
- Mark C. Nicastre

=== Finances ===
Year	Assets	Liabilities	Net Assets
2014	$348,552,000.00	$236,017,000.00	$112,535,000.00
2013	$358,504,000.00	$246,896,000.00	$110,260,000.00
2012	$367,825,000.00	$263,113,000.00	$104,712,000.00
2011	$379,346,000.00	$281,646,000.00	$97,700,000.00
2010	$376,351,000.00	$282,787,000.00	$93,564,000.00
2009	$379,974,000.00	$296,739,000.00	$83,235,000.00

== See also ==
- Parking Wars – A&E television series featuring the PPA
