= 2024 United States attorney general elections =

- November 5, 2024

10 attorney general offices (Note: Seat tallies and popular vote do not include states that do not elect attorneys general or territorial attorneys general.)
	Majority party	Minority party
Party	Republican	Democratic
Seats before	23	20
Seats after	24	19
Seat change	▲1	▼1
Popular vote	14,080,527	12,630,916
Percentage	51.73%	46.41%
Seats up	5	5
Seats won	6	4
- Democratic hold; Republican hold; Republican gain; No election

The 2024 United States attorney general elections were held on November 5, 2024, to elect the attorneys general of ten U.S. states. The previous elections for this group of states took place in 2020, while Vermont's attorney general was last elected in 2022.

These elections took place concurrently with the 2024 presidential election, elections to the Senate and House of Representatives, and various other state and local elections. Republicans had a net gain of one seat in these elections, flipping Pennsylvania.

== Partisan composition ==
Going into the election, there were 23 Republican attorneys general and 20 Democratic attorneys general in the United States. This class of attorneys general was made up of 5 Democrats and 5 Republicans. Democrats were defending one state won by Donald Trump in 2020 (North Carolina), while Republicans did not hold any states won by Joe Biden.

== Election predictions ==
Several sites and individuals published predictions of competitive seats. These predictions looked at factors such as the strength of the incumbent (if the incumbent is running for re-election), the strength of the candidates, and the partisan leanings of the state (reflected in part by the state's Cook Partisan Voting Index rating). The predictions assigned ratings to each seat, with the rating indicating the predicted advantage that a party has in winning that seat.

Most election predictors use:

- "tossup": no advantage
- "tilt" (used by some predictors): advantage that is not quite as strong as "lean"
- "lean": slight advantage
- "likely": significant, but surmountable, advantage
- "safe": near-certain chance of victory

State	PVI	Incumbent	Last race	Sabato July 25, 2024	Result
Indiana	R+11	Todd Rokita	58.3% R	Likely R	Rokita; 58.8% R
Missouri	R+10	Andrew Bailey	59.4% R	Safe R	Bailey; 59.8% R
Montana	R+11	Austin Knudsen	58.5% R	Safe R	Knudsen; 59.7% R
North Carolina	R+3	Josh Stein (retiring)	50.1% D	Tossup	Jackson; 51.4% D
Oregon	D+6	Ellen Rosenblum (retiring)	56.0% D	Likely D	Rayfield; 54.4% D
Pennsylvania	R+2	Michelle Henry (retiring)	50.9% D	Tossup	Sunday; 50.8% R (flip)
Utah	R+13	Sean Reyes (retiring)	60.6% R	Safe R	Brown; 57.8% R
Vermont	D+16	Charity Clark	65.1% D	Safe D	Clark; 57.8% D
Washington	D+8	Bob Ferguson (retiring)	56.4% D	Safe D	Brown; 55.6% D
West Virginia	R+22	Patrick Morrisey (retiring)	63.8% R	Safe R	McCuskey; 70.0% R

== Race summary ==
State	Attorney General	Party	First elected	Status	Candidates
Indiana	Todd Rokita	Republican	2020	Incumbent re-elected.	▌ ✓ Todd Rokita (Republican) 58.83%; ▌Destiny Wells (Democratic) 41.17%
Missouri	Andrew Bailey	Republican	2023 (Note: Bailey took office after his predecessor, Eric Schmitt, resigned to take office as U.S. senator.)	Incumbent elected to full term.	▌ ✓ Andrew Bailey (Republican) 59.78%; ▌Elad Gross (Democratic) 37.92%; ▌Ryan Munro (Libertarian) 2.3%
Montana	Austin Knudsen	Republican	2020	Incumbent re-elected.	▌ ✓ Austin Knudsen (Republican) 59.71%; ▌Ben Alke (Democratic) 40.29%
North Carolina	Josh Stein	Democratic	2016	Incumbent retired to run for governor. Democratic hold.	▌ ✓ Jeff Jackson (Democratic) 51.43%; ▌Dan Bishop (Republican) 48.57%
Oregon	Ellen Rosenblum	Democratic	2012 (Note: Rosenblum took office after her predecessor, John Kroger, resigned. She was subsequently elected in 2012.)	Incumbent retired. Democratic hold.	▌ ✓ Dan Rayfield (Democratic) 54.37%; ▌Will Lathrop (Republican) 45.51%
Pennsylvania	Michelle Henry	Democratic	2023 (Note: Henry took office after her predecessor, Josh Shapiro, resigned.)	Interim appointee retired. Republican gain.	▌ ✓ Dave Sunday (Republican) 50.81%; ▌Eugene DePasquale (Democratic) 46.2%; ▌Rob Cowburn (Libertarian) 1.29%; ▌Eric Settle (Forward) 0.99%
Utah	Sean Reyes	Republican	2013 (Note: Reyes took office after his predecessor, John Swallow, resigned. He was subsequently elected in 2014.)	Incumbent retired. Republican hold.	▌ ✓ Derek Brown (Republican) 57.84%; ▌Rudy Bautista (Democratic) 27.68%; ▌Michelle Quist (United Utah) 7.16%; ▌Andrew McCullough (Libertarian) 3.86%
Vermont	Charity Clark	Democratic	2022	Incumbent re-elected.	▌ ✓ Charity Clark (Democratic) 57.82%; ▌Ture Nelson (Republican) 37.1%; ▌ Kevin Gustafson (Green Mountain Peace and Justice) 4.94%
Washington	Bob Ferguson	Democratic	2012	Incumbent retired to run for governor. Democratic hold.	▌ ✓ Nick Brown (Democratic) 55.58%; ▌Pete Serrano (Republican) 44.33%
West Virginia	Patrick Morrisey	Republican	2012	Incumbent retired to run for governor. Republican hold.	▌ ✓ JB McCuskey (Republican) 70.02%; ▌Teresa Toriseva (Democratic) 29.98%

== Closest races ==
States where the margin of victory was between 1% and 5%:

1. North Carolina, 2.86%
2. Pennsylvania, 4.61%

States where the margin of victory was under 10%:

1. Oregon, 8.86%

Blue denotes races won by Democrats. Red denotes races won by Republicans.

== Indiana ==
Indiana Attorney General election
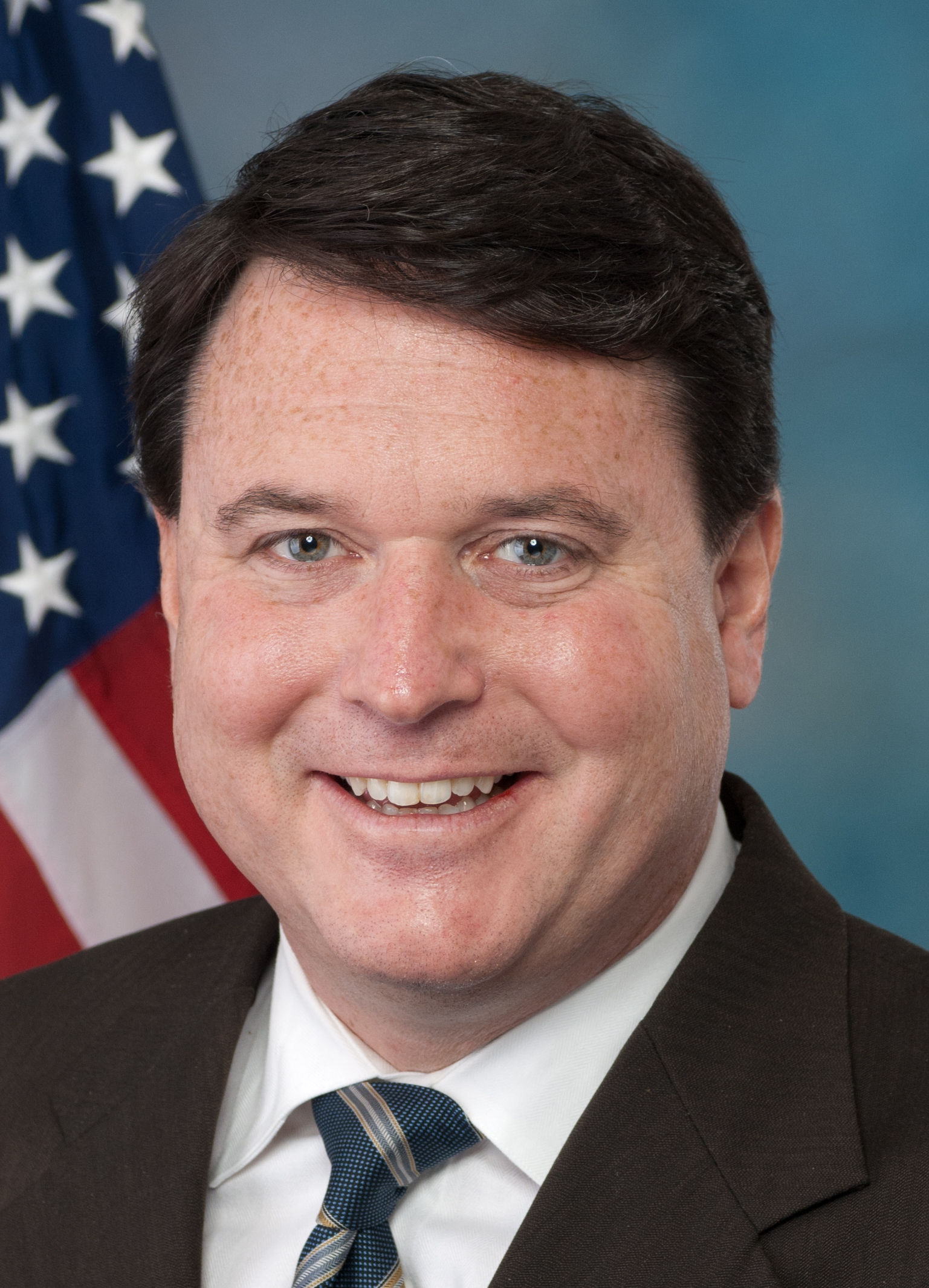

Nominee	Todd Rokita	Destiny Wells
Party	Republican	Democratic
Popular vote	1,669,586	1,168,512
Percentage	58.83%	41.17%
- County results Rokita: 50–60% 60–70% 70–80% 80–90% Wells: 50–60% 60–70%
Attorney General before election
Todd Rokita
Republican
Elected Attorney General
Todd Rokita
Republican

Attorney General Todd Rokita was elected in 2020 with 58.3% of the vote. He successfully ran for re-election defeating Democratic lawyer Destiny Wells.

2024 Indiana Attorney General election
Party	Candidate	Votes	%	±%
Republican	Todd Rokita (incumbent)	1,669,586	58.83%	+0.49%
Democratic	Destiny Wells	1,168,512	41.17%	−0.49%
Total votes		2,838,098	100.00%	N/A
Republican hold				

== Missouri ==
Missouri Attorney General election
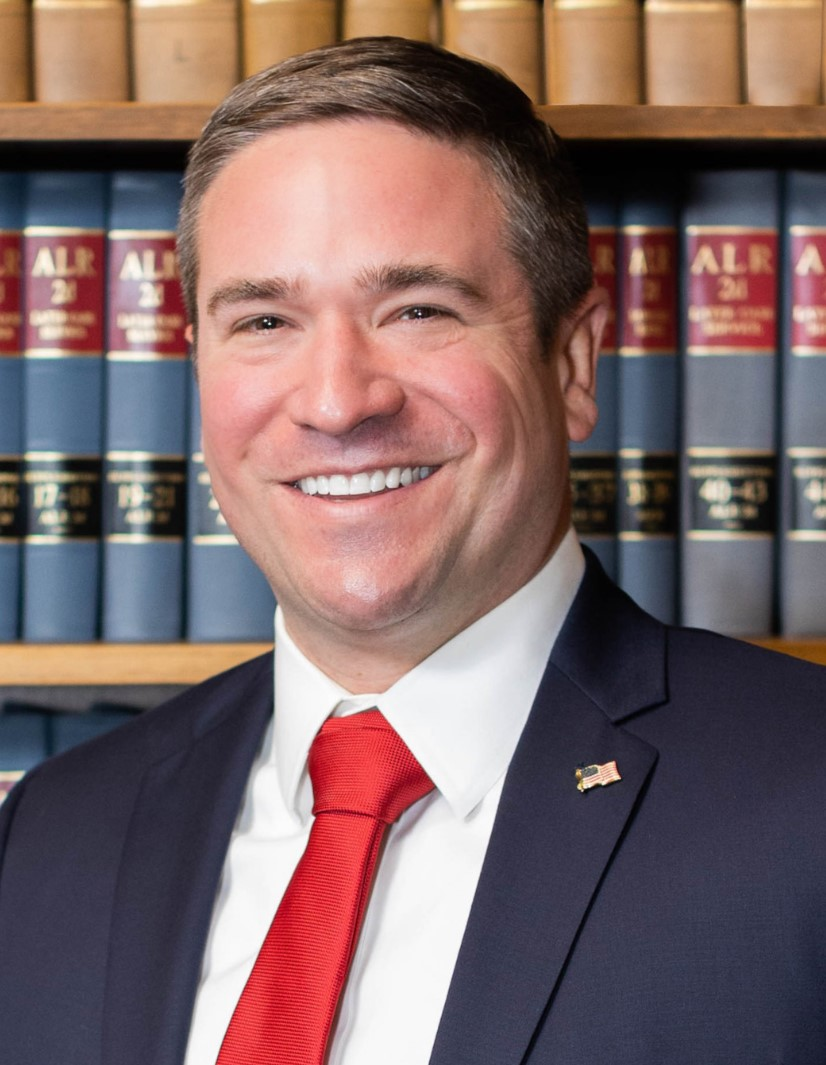

Nominee	Andrew Bailey	Elad Gross
Party	Republican	Democratic
Popular vote	1,739,626	1,103,482
Percentage	59.78%	37.92%
- County results Bailey: 50–60% 60–70% 70–80% 80–90% Gross: 50–60% 70–80%
Attorney General before election
Andrew Bailey
Republican
Elected Attorney General
Andrew Bailey
Republican

Attorney General Andrew Bailey was appointed in 2023 after his predecessor, Eric Schmitt, resigned after being elected to the United States Senate. He successfully ran for a full term, defeating Democratic civil rights attorney Elad Gross.

Republican primary results
Party	Candidate	Votes	%
Republican	Andrew Bailey (incumbent)	413,465	63.0
Republican	Will Scharf	242,680	37.0
Total votes		656,145	100.0

Democratic primary results
Party	Candidate	Votes	%
Democratic	Elad Gross	343,934	100.00%
Total votes		343,934	100.00%

Libertarian primary results
Party	Candidate	Votes	%
Libertarian	Ryan Munro	2,401	100.00%
Total votes		2,401	100.00%

2024 Missouri Attorney General election
Party	Candidate	Votes	%	±%
Republican	Andrew Bailey (incumbent)	1,739,626	59.78%	+0.40%
Democratic	Elad Gross	1,103,482	37.92%	+0.05%
Libertarian	Ryan Munro	66,878	2.30%	−0.45%
Total votes		2,909,986	100.00%	N/A
Republican hold				

== Montana ==
Montana Attorney General election
Nominee	Austin Knudsen	Ben Alke
Party	Republican	Democratic
Popular vote	352,682	237,928
Percentage	59.71%	40.29%
- County results Knudsen: 50–60% 60–70% 70–80% 80–90% 90-100% Alke: 50–60% 60–70%
Attorney General before election
Austin Knudsen
Republican
Elected Attorney General
Austin Knudsen
Republican

Attorney General Austin Knudsen was elected in 2020 with 58.5% of the vote. He successfully ran for re-election defeating Democratic attorney Ben Alke.

Republican primary results
Party	Candidate	Votes	%
Republican	Austin Knudsen (incumbent)	148,458	82.20%
Republican	Logan Olson	32,141	17.80%
Total votes		180,599	100.00%

Democratic primary results
Party	Candidate	Votes	%
Democratic	Ben Alke	93,295	100.00%
Total votes		93,295	100.00%

2024 Montana Attorney General election
Party	Candidate	Votes	%	±%
Republican	Austin Knudsen (incumbent)	352,682	59.71%	+1.20
Democratic	Ben Alke	237,928	40.29%	–1.20
Total votes		590,610	100.00%	N/A
Republican hold				

== North Carolina ==
North Carolina Attorney General election
- Turnout: 73.73% (▲0.18%)
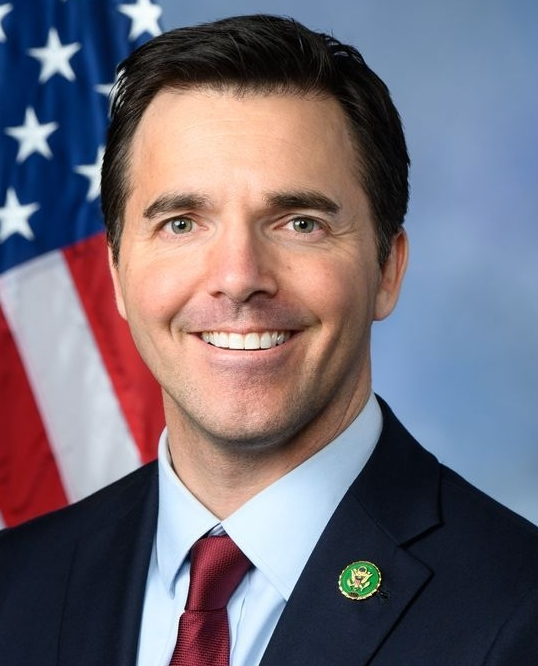

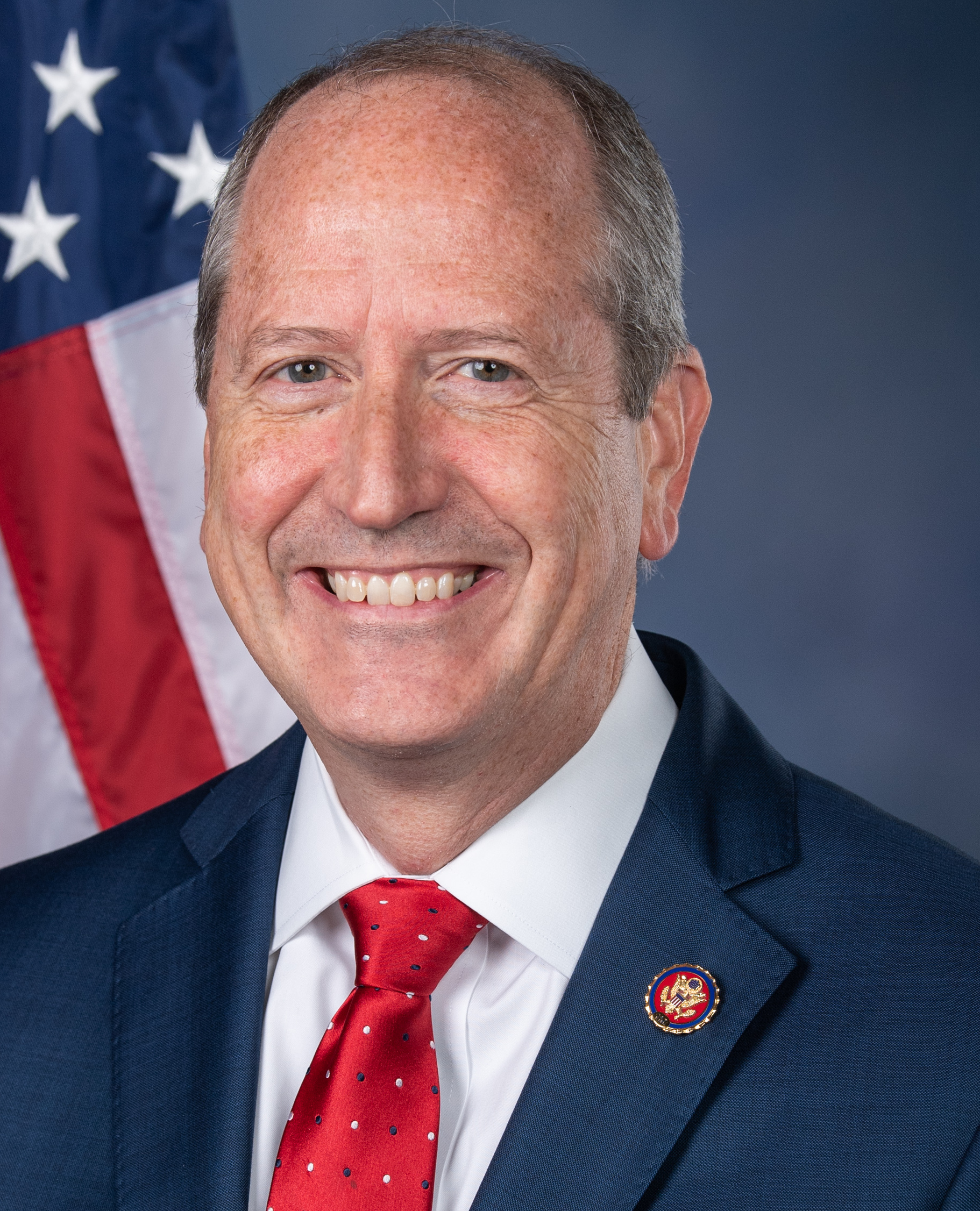
Candidate	Jeff Jackson	Dan Bishop
Party	Democratic	Republican
Popular vote	2,874,960	2,715,411
Percentage	51.43%	48.57%
- County results Jackson: 50-60% 60-70% 70-80% 80–90% Bishop: 50-60% 60-70% 70-80%
Attorney General before election
Josh Stein
Democratic
Elected Attorney General
Jeff Jackson
Democratic

Attorney General Josh Stein was re-elected in 2020 with 50.1% of the vote. He retired to run for governor.

U.S. Representative Dan Bishop was the lone Republican candidate.

U.S. Representative Jeff Jackson won the Democratic nomination defeating Durham County district attorney Satana Deberry and lawyer and Marine Corps veteran Tim Dunn.

In the general election Jeff Jackon defeated Dan Bishop with 51.43% of the vote.

Democratic primary results
Party	Candidate	Votes	%
Democratic	Jeff Jackson	370,666	54.83%
Democratic	Satana Deberry	223,835	33.11%
Democratic	Tim Dunn	81,492	12.06%
Total votes		675,993	100.00%

2024 North Carolina Attorney General election
Party	Candidate	Votes	%	±%
Democratic	Jeff Jackson	2,874,960	51.43%	+1.30%
Republican	Dan Bishop	2,715,411	48.57%	–1.30%
Total votes		5,590,371	100.00%	N/A
Democratic hold				

== Oregon ==
Oregon Attorney General election
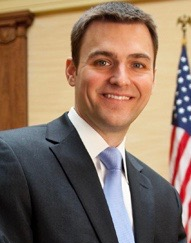

Candidate	Dan Rayfield	Will Lathrop
Party	Democratic	Republican
Popular vote	1,156,489	967,964
Percentage	54.37%	45.51%
- County results Rayfield: 50–60% 60–70% 70–80% Lathrop: 50–60% 60–70% 70–80% 80–90%
Attorney General before election
Ellen Rosenblum
Democratic
Elected Attorney General
Dan Rayfield
Democratic

Attorney General Ellen Rosenblum was re-elected in 2020 with 56% of the vote. She was eligible to seek re-election, but stated in September 2023 that she would retire. Democratic House Speaker Dan Rayfield defeated International Justice Mission executive country director Will Lanthrop in the general election.

Democratic primary results
Party	Candidate	Votes	%
Democratic	Dan Rayfield	318,313	75.71%
Democratic	Shaina Pomerantz	102,146	24.29%
Total votes		420,459	100.00%

Republican primary results
Party	Candidate	Votes	%
Republican	Will Lathrop	190,995	64.57%
Republican	Michael Cross	104,813	35.43%
Total votes		295,808	100.00%

2024 Oregon Attorney General election
Party	Candidate	Votes	%	±%
Democratic	Dan Rayfield	1,156,489	54.37%	–1.60%
Republican	Will Lathrop	967,964	45.51%	+4.16%
Write-in		2,612	0.12%	–0.26%
Total votes		2,127,065	100.00%	N/A
Democratic hold				

== Pennsylvania ==
Pennsylvania Attorney General election
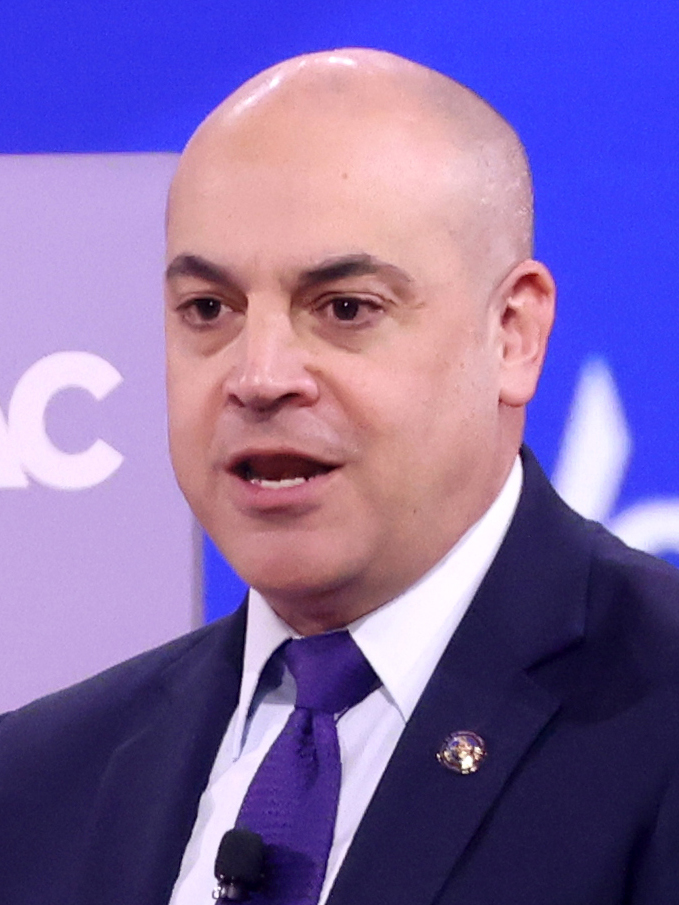

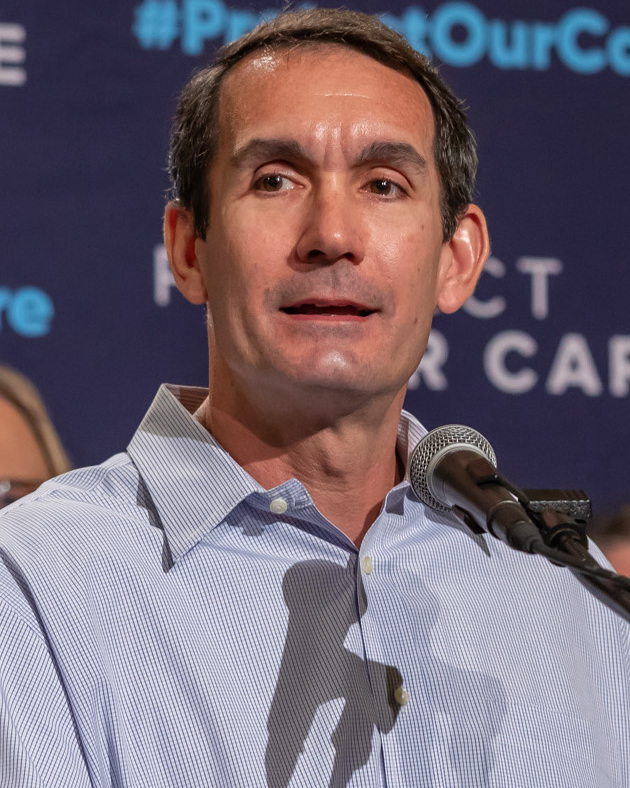
Nominee	Dave Sunday	Eugene DePasquale
Party	Republican	Democratic
Popular vote	3,496,679	3,179,376
Percentage	50.81%	46.20%
- County results Sunday: 40–50% 50–60% 60–70% 70–80% 80–90% DePasquale: 40–50% 50–60% 70–80%
Attorney General before election
Michelle Henry
Democratic
Elected Attorney General
Dave Sunday
Republican

Attorney General Josh Shapiro resigned after being elected governor. Deputy attorney general Michelle Henry was appointed as the new attorney general and she was confirmed by the state senate. She is not running for a full term.

Former Pennsylvania Auditor General Eugene DePasquale won the Democratic nomination defeating former Philadelphia chief public defender Keir Bradford-Grey, former Bucks County solicitor Joe Khan, state representative Jared Solomon, and Delaware County District Attorney Jack Stollsteimer.

York County District Attorney Dave Sunday won the Republican nomination defeating state representative Wendell Craig Williams.

Republican nominee Dave Sunday defeated Eugene DePasquale with 50.81% of the vote, flipping the office to Republicans control.

Democratic primary results
Party	Candidate	Votes	%
Democratic	Eugene DePasquale	371,911	35.40%
Democratic	Jack Stollsteimer	212,413	20.22%
Democratic	Joe Khan	167,895	15.98%
Democratic	Keir Bradford-Grey	160,369	15.27%
Democratic	Jared Solomon	137,920	13.13%
Total votes		1,050,508	100.00%

Republican primary results
Party	Candidate	Votes	%
Republican	Dave Sunday	620,515	70.36%
Republican	Craig Williams	261,419	29.64%
Total votes		881,934	100.00%

2024 Pennsylvania Attorney General election
Party	Candidate	Votes	%	±%
Republican	Dave Sunday	3,496,679	50.81%	+4.48
Democratic	Eugene DePasquale	3,179,376	46.20%	−4.65
Libertarian	Rob Cowburn	88,835	1.29%	−0.48
Green	Richard Weiss	68,046	0.99%	−0.05
Constitution	Justin Magill	31,282	0.45%	N/A
Forward	Eric Settle	18,151	0.26%	N/A
Total votes		6,882,369	100.00%	N/A
Republican gain from Democratic				

== Utah ==
Utah Attorney General election
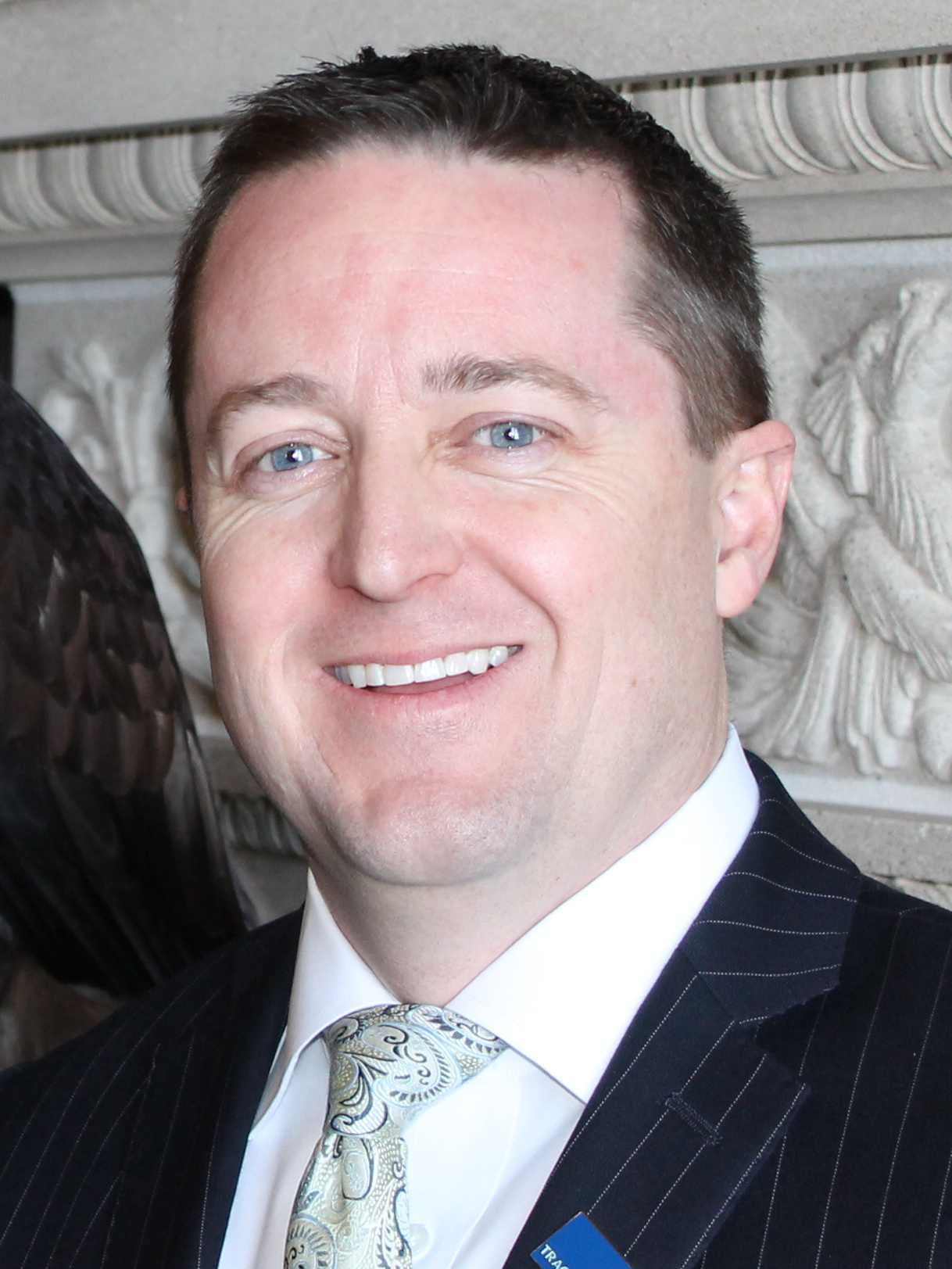

Nominee	Derek Brown	Rudy Bautista	Michelle Quist
Party	Republican	Democratic	United Utah
Popular vote	838,445	401,234	103,831
Percentage	57.84%	27.68%	7.16%
- County results Brown: 40–50% 50–60% 60–70% 70–80% 80–90% Bautista: 40–50%
Attorney General before election
Sean Reyes
Republican
Elected Attorney General
Derek Brown
Republican

Attorney General Sean Reyes was re-elected in 2020 with 60.6% of the vote. He was eligible to seek re-election, and had previously stated in September 2023 that he would do so, but announced in December 2023 that he would not run.

Former chair of the Utah Republican Party, Derek Brown, defeated Democratic defense attorney Rudy Bautista with 57.84% of the vote.

Republican primary results
Party	Candidate	Votes	%
Republican	Derek Brown	178,164	43.59%
Republican	Rachel Terry	133,019	32.55%
Republican	Frank Mylar	97,522	23.86%
Total votes		408,705	100.00%

2024 Utah Attorney General election
Party	Candidate	Votes	%	±%
Republican	Derek Brown	838,445	57.84%	−2.74
Democratic	Rudy Bautista	401,234	27.68%	−6.06
United Utah	Michelle Quist	103,831	7.16%	N/A
Libertarian	Andrew McCullough	55,932	3.86%	−1.82
Independent	Austin Hepworth	50,053	3.45%	N/A
Total votes		1,449,495	100.00%	N/A
Republican hold				

== Vermont ==
Vermont Attorney General election
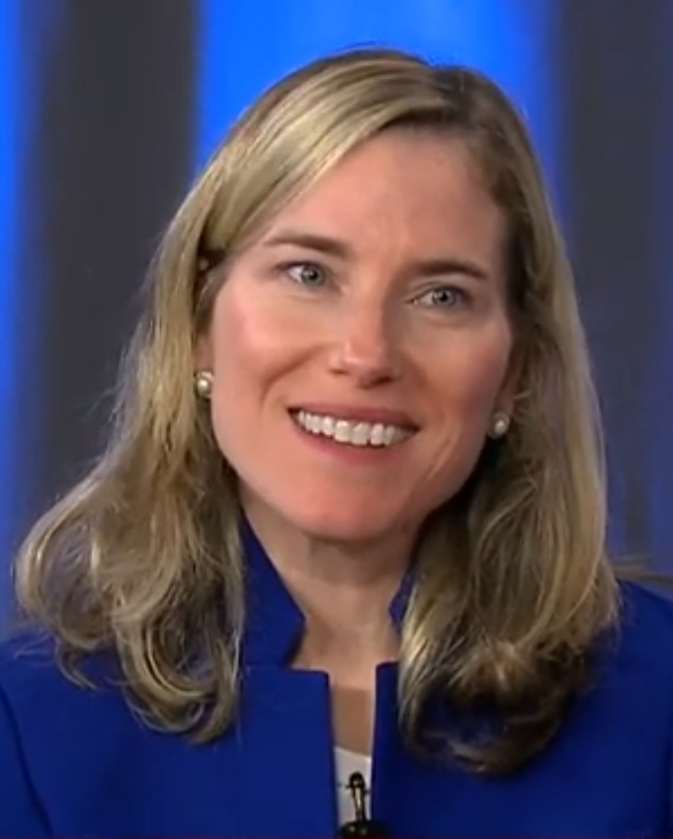

Nominee	Charity Clark	Ture Nelson
Party	Democratic	Republican
Popular vote	200,711	128,798
Percentage	57.82%	37.10%
- Clark: 40–50% 50–60% 60–70% 70–80% 80–90% Nelson: 40–50% 50–60% 60–70% Tie: 40–50% No Data/Vote
Attorney General before election
Charity Clark
Democratic
Elected Attorney General
Charity Clark
Democratic

Attorney General Charity Clark was elected in 2022 with 61.3% of the vote. She won the Democratic primary unopposed and in the general election defeated Republican Berlin Town Administrator Ture Nelson with 57.82% of the vote.

Democratic primary results
Party	Candidate	Votes	%
Democratic	Charity Clark (incumbent)	43,275	99.05%
Write-in		416	0.95%
Total votes		43,691	100.00%

Republican primary results
Party	Candidate	Votes	%
Republican	H. Brooke Paige	18,081	97.06%
Write-in		548	2.94%
Total votes		18,629	100.00%

Progressive primary results
Party	Candidate	Votes	%
Progressive	Elijah Bergman	270	87.95%
Write-in		37	12.05%
Total votes		307	100.00%

2024 Vermont Attorney General election
Party	Candidate	Votes	%	±%
Democratic	Charity Clark (incumbent)	200,711	57.82%	–7.25%
Republican	Ture Nelson	128,798	37.10%	+2.34%
Green Mountain Peace and Justice	Kevin Gustafson	17,159	4.94%	N/A
Write-in		490	0.13%	–0.04%
Total votes		347,158	100.00%	N/A
Democratic hold				

== Washington ==
Washington Attorney General election
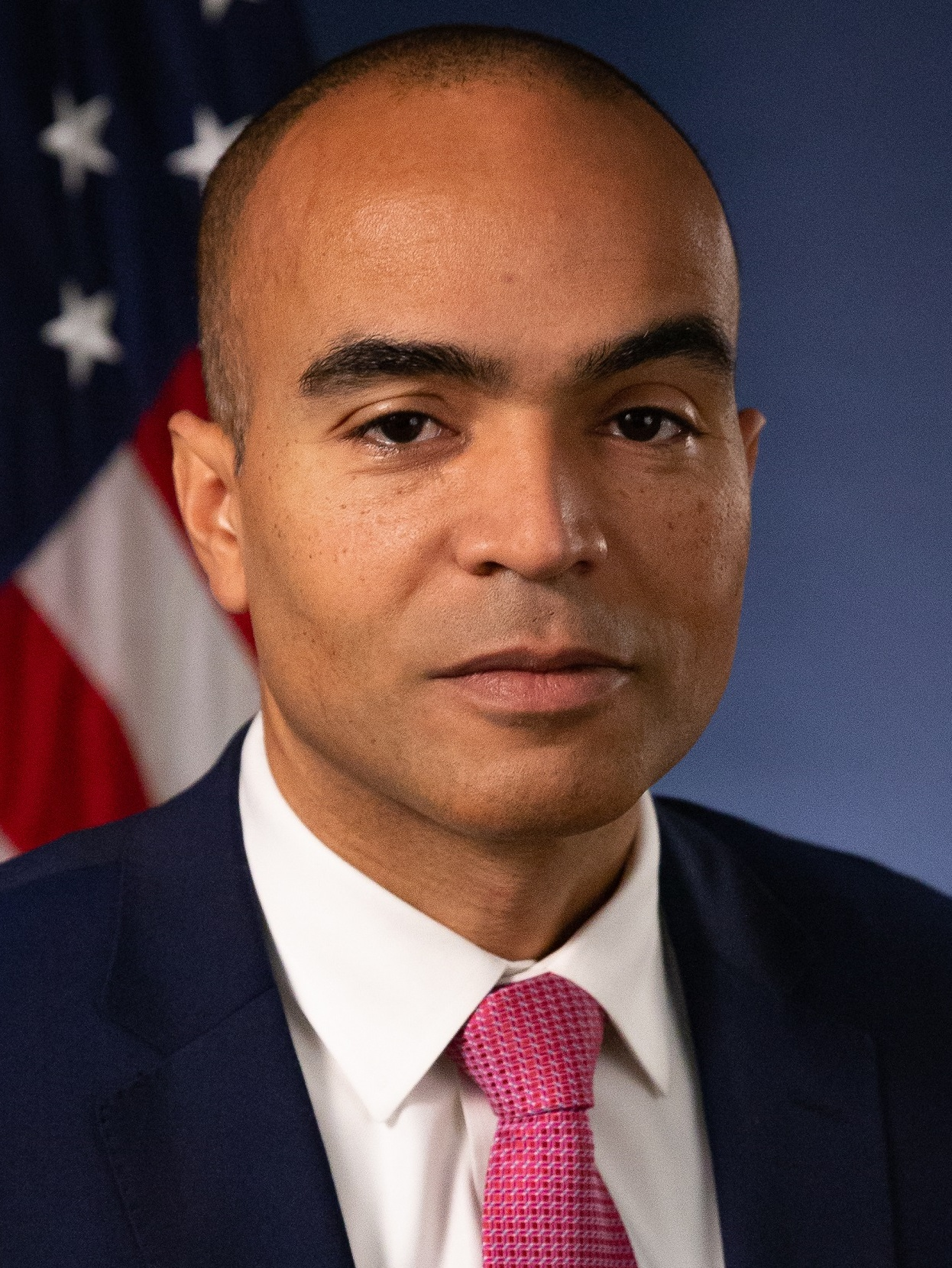

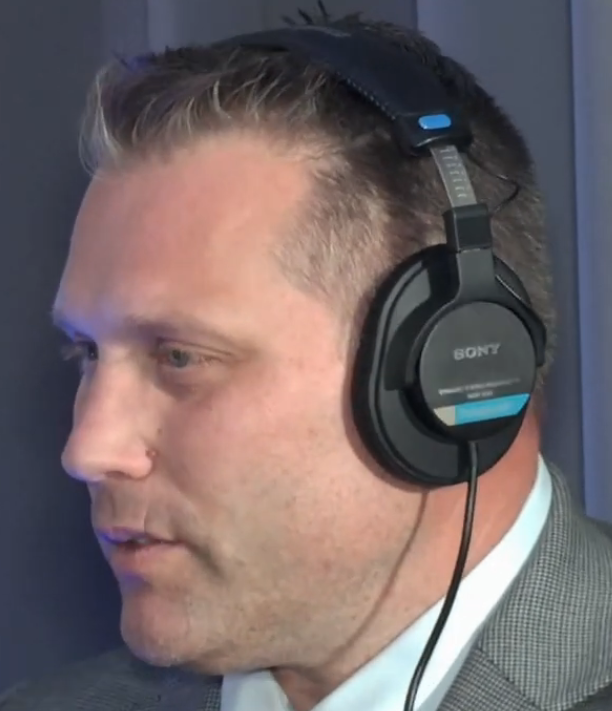
Nominee	Nick Brown	Pete Serrano
Party	Democratic	Republican
Popular vote	2,093,570	1,669,884
Percentage	55.58%	44.33%
- County results Brown: 50–60% 70–80% Serrano: 50–60% 60–70% 70–80%
Attorney General before election
Bob Ferguson
Democratic
Elected Attorney General
Nicholas Brown
Democratic

Attorney General Bob Ferguson was re-elected in 2020 with 56.4% of the vote. He retired to run for governor.

Democratic former U.S. Attorney for the Western District of Washington Nick Brown defeated Republican Pasco city councilman Pete Serrano have in the general election with 55.58% of the vote.

Blanket primary election results
Party	Candidate	Votes	%
Republican	Pete Serrano	814,372	42.11%
Democratic	Nick Brown	682,360	35.28%
Democratic	Manka Dhingra	435,919	22.54%
Write-in		1,284	0.07%
Total votes		1,933,935	100.00%

2024 Washington Attorney General election
Party	Candidate	Votes	%	±%
Democratic	Nick Brown	2,093,570	55.58%	−0.85
Republican	Pete Serrano	1,669,884	44.33%	+0.86
Write-in		3,616	0.10%	N/A
Total votes		3,767,070	100.00%	N/A
Democratic hold				

== West Virginia ==
West Virginia Attorney General election
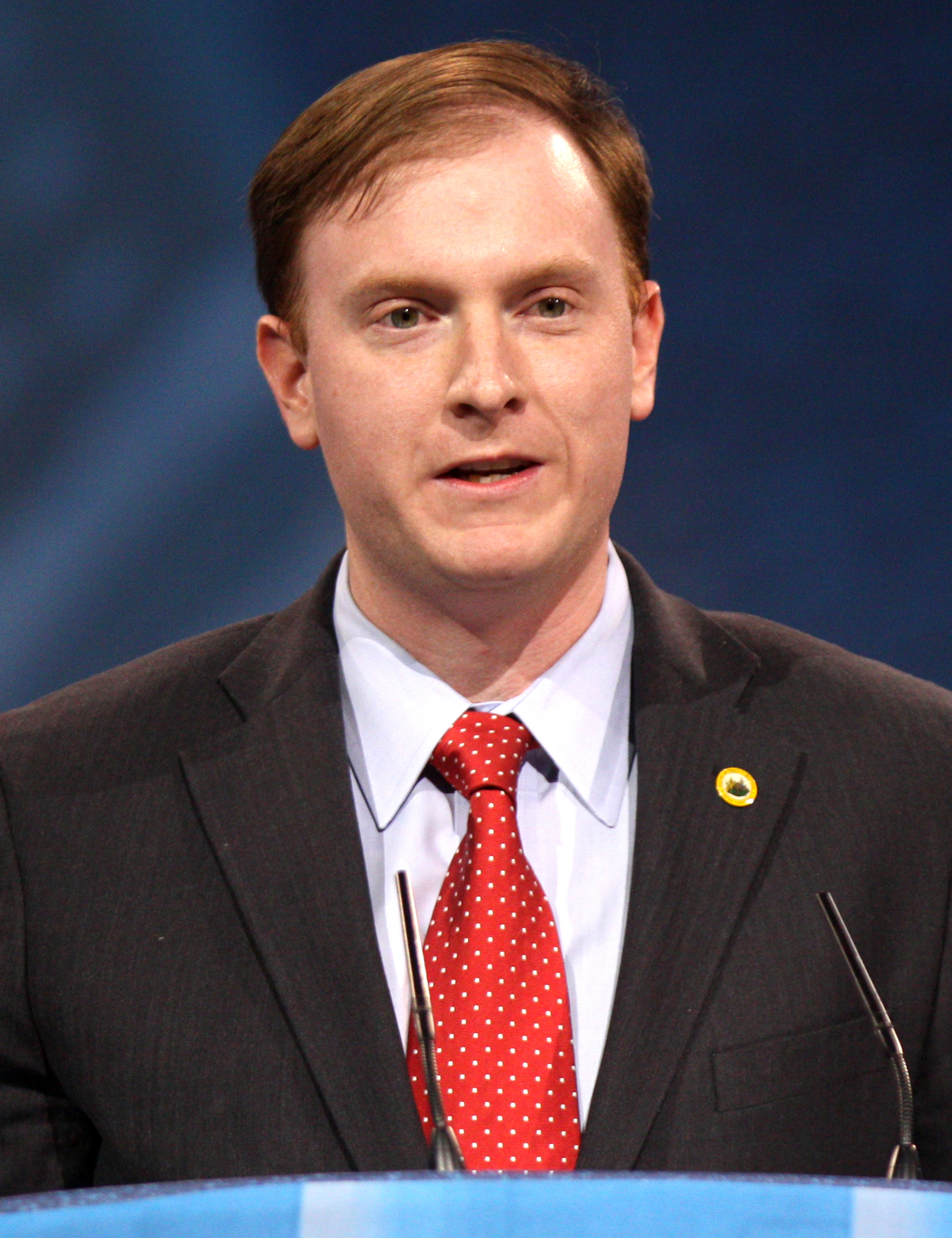

Nominee	JB McCuskey	Teresa Toriseva
Party	Republican	Democratic
Popular vote	501,452	214,654
Percentage	70.02%	29.98%
- County results McCuskey: 50–60% 60–70% 70–80% 80–90%
Attorney General before election
Patrick Morrisey
Republican
Elected Attorney General
JB McCuskey
Republican

Attorney General Patrick Morrisey was re-elected in 2020 with 63.8% of the vote. He is retiring to run for governor.

Republican State Auditor JB McCuskey defeated state senator and former U.S. Attorney for the Southern District of West Virginia Michael Stuart for the Republican nomination.

In the Democratic primary attorney Teresa Toriseva seated former mayor of South Charleston Richie Robb for the Democratic nomination.

In the general election, JB McCuskey defeated Teresa Toriseva with 70.02% of the vote.

Republican primary results
Party	Candidate	Votes	%
Republican	JB McCuskey	117,263	59.83%
Republican	Michael Stuart	78,745	40.17%
Total votes		196,008	100.00%

Democratic primary results
Party	Candidate	Votes	%
Democratic	Teresa Toriseva	50,480	52.67%
Democratic	Richie Robb	45,356	47.33%
Total votes		95,836	100.00%

2024 West Virginia Attorney General election
Party	Candidate	Votes	%	±%
Republican	JB McCuskey	501,452	70.02%	+6.25
Democratic	Teresa Toriseva	214,654	29.98%	−6.25
Total votes		716,106	100.00%	N/A
Republican hold				

== See also ==
- 2024 United States elections
