= 2024 Pennsylvania Attorney General election =

- November 5, 2024
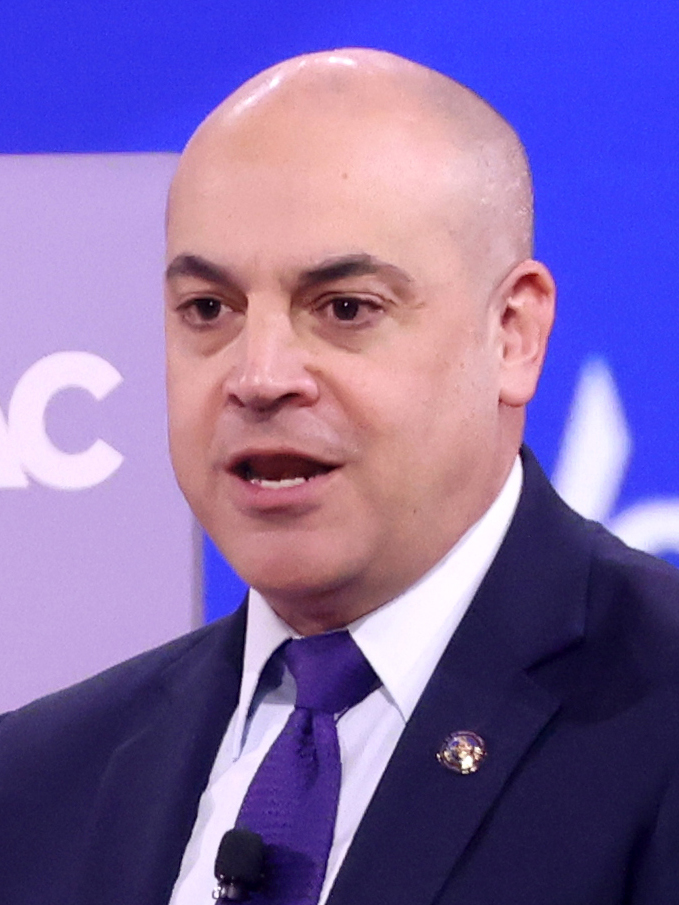

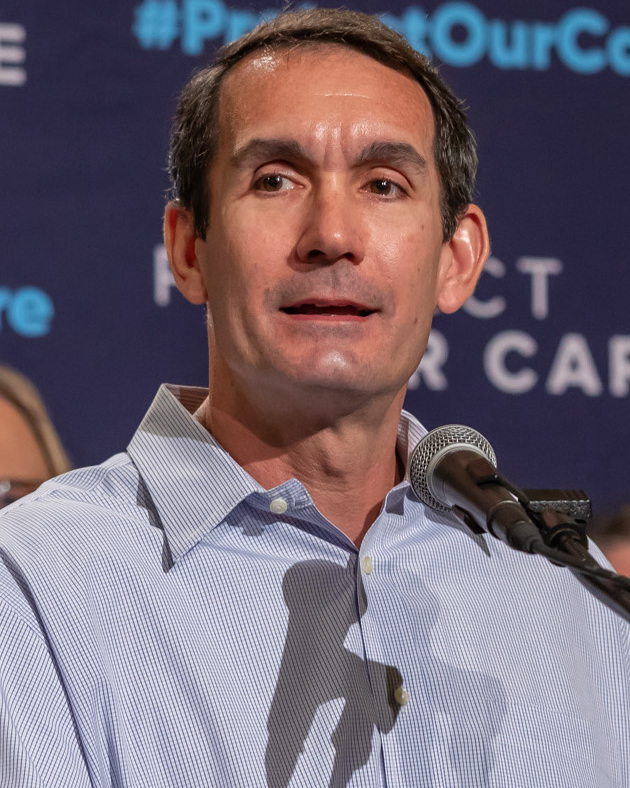
Nominee	Dave Sunday	Eugene DePasquale
Party	Republican	Democratic
Popular vote	3,496,679	3,179,376
Percentage	50.81%	46.20%
- Sunday: 40–50% 50–60% 60–70% 70–80% 80–90% DePasquale: 50–60% 60–70% 70–80% 80–90%
Attorney General before election
Michelle Henry
Democratic
Elected Attorney General
Dave Sunday
Republican

The 2024 Pennsylvania Attorney General election was held on November 5, 2024, to elect the attorney general of the U.S. state of Pennsylvania. Republican York County District Attorney Dave Sunday defeated former auditor general Eugene DePasquale in the general election, becoming the first Republican to be elected state attorney general since 2008. This was the only attorney general seat to change parties in 2024.

Sunday carried Centre and Lehigh counties, both of which voted for Democratic nominee Kamala Harris in the concurrent presidential election.

Attorney General Josh Shapiro, who was re-elected in 2020, would have been ineligible to seek a third term in 2024 due to term limits. He instead ran successfully for governor of Pennsylvania in 2022.

In accordance with Article IV, Section 8, of the Pennsylvania Constitution, upon taking office as governor, Shapiro was permitted to nominate his successor as attorney general to serve the remaining two years of the term after being confirmed by the Pennsylvania Senate. By tradition, an appointed attorney general agrees not to run for the post in the next election. In the interim between Shapiro's resignation to become governor and the appointee's installation, first deputy attorney general Michelle Henry, a Democrat, served as acting attorney general. Henry was appointed for the remainder of Shapiro's term, and in accordance with tradition did not run in the 2024 race.

== Democratic primary ==
=== Candidates ===
==== Nominee ====
- Eugene DePasquale, former Pennsylvania auditor general (2013–2021) and nominee for Pennsylvania's 10th congressional district in 2020

==== Eliminated in primary ====
- Keir Bradford-Grey, former Philadelphia chief public defender (2015–2022)
- Joe Khan, former Bucks County solicitor (2020–2023) and candidate for Philadelphia district attorney in 2017
- Jared Solomon, state representative from the 202nd district (2017–present)
- Jack Stollsteimer, Delaware County district attorney (2019–present)

==== Declined ====
- Michelle Henry, incumbent attorney general (2023–2025)

=== Endorsements ===
Keir Bradford-Grey

State legislators

- Heather Boyd, state representative for the 163rd district (2023–present)
- Gina Curry, state representative for the 164th district (2021–present)
- Vincent Hughes, state senator for the 7th district (1994–present)
- Carol Kazeem, state representative for the 159th district (2023–present)
- Anthony H. Williams, state senator for the 8th district (1998–present)
- Regina Young, state representative for the 185th district (2021–present)

Local officials

- Jamie Gauthier, Philadelphia city councilor from the 3rd district (2020–present)
- Curtis J. Jones Jr., Philadelphia city councilor from the 4th district (2008–present)
- Quetcy Lozada, Philadelphia city councilor from the 7th district (2022–present)
- Nicolas O'Rourke, at-large Philadelphia city councilor (2024–present) (Working Families)
- Isaiah Thomas, at-large Philadelphia city councilor (2020–present)

Labor unions

- Laborers Local 57
- Teamsters Local 623

Organizations

- EMILY's List
- NextGen America
- People for the American Way

Political parties

- Working Families Party
Eugene DePasquale

U.S. representatives

- Mike Doyle, PA-18 (Note: Numbered as the 14th district from 2003–2019) (1995–2022)

Local officials

- Rich Fitzgerald, Allegheny County executive (2012–2024)
- Corey O'Connor, Allegheny County controller (2022–present)

Labor unions

- Ironworkers Local 3
- Pittsburgh Federation of Teachers
- Plumbers and Pipefitters Local 520

Newspapers

- The Philadelphia Inquirer

Party chapters

- Armstrong County Democratic Party
- Beaver County Democratic Party
- Northumberland County Democratic Party
- Perry County Democratic Party
- University of Pittsburgh College Democrats
Joe Khan

State legislators

- Tim Brennan, state representative for the 29th district (2023–present)
- Melissa Cerrato, state representative for the 151st district (2023–present)
- Paul Friel, state representative for the 26th district (2023–present)
- Matt Gergely, state representative for the 35th district (2023–present)
- G. Roni Green, state representative for the 190th district (2020, 2023–present)
- Joe Hohenstein, state representative for the 177th district (2019–present)
- Mary Isaacson state representative for the 175th district (2019–present)
- Tarik Khan, state representative for the 194th district (2023–present) (Joe Khan's brother)
- Jennifer Mann, former state representative for the 132nd district (1999–2013)
- Brian Munroe, state representative for the 144th district (2023–present)
- Katie Muth, state senator for the 44th district (2019–present)
- Chris Pielli, state representative for the 156th district (2023–present)
- Mark Rozzi, state representative for the 126th district (2013–present), speaker of the Pennsylvania House of Representatives (2023)
- Steve Santarsiero, state senator for the 10st district (2019–present)
- Nikil Saval, state senator for the 1st district (2021–present)
- Peter Schweyer, state representative for the 134th district (2015–present)
- Joshua Siegel, state representative for the 22nd district (2023–present)
- Ismail Smith-Wade-El, state representative for the 49th district (2023–present)

Local officials

- Phil Armstrong, Lehigh County executive
- Lamont McClure, Northampton County executive
- Ray O'Connell, mayor of Allentown (2018–2022)

Labor unions

- AFSCME Local 1739

Organizations

- Emgage

Newspapers

- Philadelphia Gay News

Party chapters

- Bucks County Democratic Party
Jared Solomon

State legislators

- Joe Ciresi, state representative for the 146th district (2019–present)
- Mary Jo Daley, state representative for the 148th district (2013–present)
- Tina Davis, state representative for the 144th district (2011–present)
- Nancy Guenst, state representative for the 152nd district (2021–present)
- Jim Haddock, state representative for the 118th district (2023–present)
- Kristine Howard, state representative for the 176th district (2019–present)
- Anita Kulik, state representative for the 45th district (2017–present)
- Maureen Madden, state representative for the 115th district (2017–present)
- Steve Malagari, state representative for the 53rd district (2019–present)
- Dan Miller, state representative for the 42nd district (2013–present)
- Eddie Day Pashinski, state representative for the 121st district (2007–present)
- Tarah Probst, state representative for the 189th district (2023–present)
- Abigail Salisbury, state representative for the 34th district (2023–present)
- Ben Sanchez, state representative for the 153rd district (2019–present)
- Christina Sappey, state representative for the 158th district (2019–present)
- Christine Tartaglione, state senator for the 2nd district (1995–present)
- Ben Waxman, state representative for the 182nd district (2023–present)
- Joe Webster, state representative for the 150th district (2019–present)
- Dan Williams, state representative for the 74th district (2019–present)

Organizations

- VoteVets

Labor unions

- IAFF Locals 1, 22, and 302
- Transport Workers Local 234
- UFCW Local 1776
Jack Stollsteimer

Labor unions

- Eastern Atlantic States Regional Council of Carpenters
- IAFF Local 302
- IBEW Local 98
- Laborers Local 413
- Pennsylvania Building and Construction Trades Council
- Philadelphia Building and Construction Trades Council
- Pittsburgh Building Trades
- Sheet Metal Workers Local 19
- Teamsters Joint Council 53

Party chapters

- Chester County Democratic Party
- Delaware County Democratic Party
Declined to endorse

Political parties

- Pennsylvania Democratic Party

=== Debates and forums ===
No.	Date	Host	Moderator	Link	Participants (Note: Forward Party candidate Eric Settle also participated in the April 4 forum.)				
P Participant A Absent N Non-invitee I Invitee W Withdrawn									
P Participant A Absent N Non-invitee I Invitee W Withdrawn					Bradford-Grey	DePasquale	Khan	Solomon	Stollsteimer
1	March 12, 2024	WHTM abc27	Dennis Owens	WTAJ	P	P	P	P	P
2	April 4, 2024	WHYY-FM	Maiken Scott		P	A	A	P	P
3	April 17, 2024	KYW (AM)	Ian Bush	YouTube	P	P	P	P	P

=== Results ===
2024 Pennsylvania Attorney General Democratic primary results DePasquale: DePasquale—70-80%; DePasquale—60-70%; DePasquale—50-60%; DePasquale—40-50%; DePasquale—30-40%; DePasquale—20-30%; Stollsteimer: Stollsteimer—70-80%; Stollsteimer—50-60%; Stollsteimer—30-40%; Stollsteimer—20-30%; Khan: Khan—60-70%; Khan—30-40%; Khan—20-30%; Bradford-Grey: Bradford-Grey—30-40%

Democratic primary results
Party	Candidate	Votes	%
Democratic	Eugene DePasquale	371,911	35.40%
Democratic	Jack Stollsteimer	212,413	20.22%
Democratic	Joe Khan	167,895	15.98%
Democratic	Keir Bradford-Grey	160,369	15.27%
Democratic	Jared Solomon	137,920	13.13%
Total votes		1,050,508	100.00%

== Republican primary ==
=== Candidates ===
==== Nominee ====
- Dave Sunday, York County district attorney (2018–2025)

==== Eliminated in primary ====
- Craig Williams, state representative from the 160th district (2021–present) and nominee for Pennsylvania's 7th congressional district in 2008

==== Withdrawn ====
- Katayoun Copeland, former assistant U.S. attorney (2019–2023) and former Delaware County district attorney (2018–2019)

==== Declined ====
- Bill McSwain, former U.S. attorney for the Eastern District of Pennsylvania (2018–2021) and candidate for governor in 2022

=== Endorsements ===
Dave Sunday

U.S. representatives

- John Joyce, PA-13 (2019–present)
- Dan Meuser, PA-9 (2019–present)
- Lloyd Smucker, PA-11 (Note: Numbered as the 16th district from 2017–2019) (2017–present)

State officials

- Stacy Garrity, Pennsylvania treasurer (2021–present)

State legislators

- Kristin Phillips-Hill, state senator for the 28th district (2019–present)
- Mike Regan, state senator for the 31st district (2017–present)
- Kim Ward, president pro tempore of the Pennsylvania Senate (2023–present) from the 39th district (2009–present)

Organizations

- CPAC
- Fraternal Order of Police Lodge 73
- National Rifle Association Political Victory Fund
- PA Sheriffs Association
- Republican Attorneys General Association

Political parties

- Pennsylvania Republican Party

Newspapers

- The Philadelphia Inquirer
Craig Williams

State legislators

- Bryan Cutler, state representative for the 100th district (2007–present), speaker of the Pennsylvania House of Representatives (2020–2022)
- George Dunbar, state representative for the 56th district (2011–present)
- Josh Kail, state representative for the 15th district (2019–present)
- Andrew Kuzma, state representative for the 39th district (2023–present)
- Jim E. Marshall, state representative for the 14th district (2007–present)
- Natalie Mihalek, state representative for the 40th district (2019–present)
- Tim O'Neal, state representative for the 48th district (2018–present)
- Jesse Topper, state representative for the 78th district (2014–present)

=== Debates and forums ===
No.	Date	Host	Moderator	Link	Participants	
P Participant A Absent N Non-invitee I Invitee W Withdrawn						
P Participant A Absent N Non-invitee I Invitee W Withdrawn					Sunday	Williams
1	March 14, 2024	WHTM abc27	Dennis Owens	abc27	P	P
2	April 6, 2024	Pennsylvania Leadership Conference	Alex Harper		P	P

=== Polling ===
Poll source	Date(s) administered	Sample size (Note: Key: A – all adults RV – registered voters LV – likely voters V – unclear)	Margin of error	Dave Sunday	Craig Williams	Undecided
Pennsylvania Leadership Conference	April 8, 2024	240 (V)	–	63%	21%	16%

=== Results ===
2024 Pennsylvania Attorney General Republican primary results Sunday: Sunday—90-100%; Sunday—80-90%; Sunday—70-80%; Sunday—60-70%; Sunday—50-60%; Williams: Williams—30-40%

Republican primary results
Party	Candidate	Votes	%
Republican	Dave Sunday	620,515	70.36%
Republican	Craig Williams	261,419	29.64%
Total votes		881,934	100.00%

== Third-party candidates ==
=== Constitution Party ===
==== Nominee ====
- Justin Magill, attorney

=== Forward Party ===
==== Nominee ====
- Eric L. Settle, attorney, former deputy general counsel to Governor Tom Ridge

=== Green Party ===
==== Nominee ====
- Richard Weiss, lawyer, nominee for attorney general in 2020, and nominee for U.S. Senate in 2022

=== Libertarian convention ===
==== Nominee ====
- Rob Cowburn, attorney

== General election ==
=== Predictions ===
Source	Ranking	As of
Sabato's Crystal Ball	Tossup	July 25, 2024

=== Debates ===
2024 Pennsylvania attorney general election debates and forums
No.	Date	Host	Moderator	Link	Democratic	Republican	Forward
Key: P Participant A Absent N Non-invitee I Invitee W Withdrawn							
Key: P Participant A Absent N Non-invitee I Invitee W Withdrawn					DePasquale	Sunday	Settle
1	Oct. 3, 2024	WGAL-TV	Brian Roche	WGAL	P	P	N
2	Oct. 15, 2024	ABC27	Dennis Owens	ABC27	P	P	N
3	Oct. 23, 2024	Spotlight PA		YouTube	P	P	P

=== Polling ===
Poll source	Date(s) administered	Sample size	Margin of error	Eugene DePasquale (D)	Dave Sunday (R)	Other	Undecided
ActiVote	October 4–25, 2024	400 (LV)	± 4.9%	51%	49%	–	–
ActiVote	September 6 – October 7, 2024	400 (LV)	± 4.9%	50%	50%	–	–
Fabrizio Ward (R)/ Impact Research (D) (Note: Poll commissioned by AARP)	September 17–24, 2024	1,398 (LV)	–	47%	44%	–	9%
ActiVote	July 26 – August 23, 2024	400 (LV)	± 4.9%	53%	47%	–	–
Commonwealth Foundation	June 14–19, 2024	800 (RV)	± 3.46%	43%	39%	4%	13%
Fabrizio Ward (R)/ Impact Research (D)	April 24–30, 2024	1,398 (LV)	± 3.0%	43%	44%	1%	12%

=== Results ===
2024 Pennsylvania attorney general election
Party	Candidate	Votes	%	±%
Republican	Dave Sunday	3,496,679	50.81%	+4.48
Democratic	Eugene DePasquale	3,179,376	46.20%	−4.65
Libertarian	Rob Cowburn	88,835	1.29%	−0.48
Green	Richard Weiss	68,046	0.99%	−0.05
Constitution	Justin Magill	31,282	0.45%	N/A
Forward	Eric Settle	18,151	0.26%	N/A
Total votes		6,882,369	100.00%	N/A
Republican gain from Democratic				

==== By county ====
County	Dave Sunday Republican		Eugene DePasquale Democratic		Various candidates Other parties	
County	#	%	#	%	#	%
Adams	39,713	66.26%	18,439	30.77%	1,780	2.97%
Allegheny	269,179	38.14%	414,666	58.76%	21,863	3.09%
Armstrong	26,817	73.60%	8,503	23.34%	1,115	3.06%
Beaver	53,751	57.12%	37,276	39.61%	3,081	3.27%
Bedford	23,146	83.52%	3,924	14.16%	642	2.32%
Berks	111,534	55.91%	81,358	40.79%	6,583	3.31%
Blair	46,060	71.73%	16,366	25.49%	1,783	2.77%
Bradford	22,453	73.42%	7,122	23.29%	1,008	3.29%
Bucks	205,218	51.78%	180,396	45.52%	10,715	2.71%
Butler	77,951	65.24%	37,987	31.79%	3,552	2.97%
Cambria	48,314	68.81%	20,022	28.51%	1,880	2.67%
Cameron	1,638	74.45%	477	21.68%	85	3.87%
Carbon	22,387	64.69%	11,024	31.86%	1,194	3.45%
Centre	39,652	49.93%	37,544	47.28%	2,219	2.79%
Chester	147,799	45.92%	165,588	51.45%	8,481	2.64%
Clarion	14,647	74.88%	4,265	21.80%	549	3.31%
Clearfield	29,885	74.93%	8,819	22.11%	1,181	2.95%
Clinton	12,535	68.52%	5,224	28.56%	535	2.92%
Columbia	20,426	63.78%	10,369	32.38%	1,232	3.84%
Crawford	29,427	69.60%	11,405	26.97%	1,449	3.43%
Cumberland	81,504	55.59%	60,701	41.40%	4,399	3.00%
Dauphin	68,956	46.54%	74,211	50.09%	5,003	3.38%
Delaware	131,777	40.79%	183,053	56.66%	8,223	2.55%
Elk	12,254	72.18%	4,229	24.91%	493	2.90%
Erie	70,359	52.07%	59,582	44.09%	5,184	3.84%
Fayette	40,511	65.09%	20,057	32.23%	1,671	2.69%
Forest	1,862	71.04%	681	25.98%	78	2.97%
Franklin	58,263	70.58%	21,688	26.27%	2,603	3.15%
Fulton	6,773	84.55%	1,048	13.08%	190	2.37%
Greene	11,553	68.51%	4,792	28.42%	519	3.08%
Huntingdon	17,448	76.31%	4,790	20.95%	626	2.74%
Indiana	28,062	67.38%	12,340	29.63%	1,247	2.99%
Jefferson	17,974	78.41%	4,307	18.79%	642	2.80%
Juniata	9,352	78.25%	2,266	18.96%	333	2.79%
Lackawanna	51,941	45.68%	58,546	51.49%	3,208	2.82%
Lancaster	167,162	58.43%	110,818	38.73%	8,132	2.84%
Lawrence	29,433	63.53%	15,477	33.41%	1,417	3.05%
Lebanon	47,230	65.07%	23,078	31.79%	2,276	3.14%
Lehigh	89,788	48.44%	89,147	48.09%	6,436	3.46%
Luzerne	86,568	56.67%	61.732	40.41%	4,455	2.92%
Lycoming	41,218	69.75%	16,115	27.27%	1,765	2.99%
McKean	13,969	72.17%	4,701	24.29%	685	3.53%
Mercer	36,379	63.39%	19,081	33.25%	1,929	3.36%
Mifflin	16,785	77.13%	4,441	20.41%	537	2.46%
Monroe	40,784	48.40%	40,311	47.84%	3,173	3.76%
Montgomery	210,745	40.97%	289,427	56.26%	14,265	2.77%
Montour	5,931	60.56%	3,526	36.01%	336	3.43%
Northampton	87,946	51.13%	79,469	46.20%	4,584	2.67%
Northumberland	29,096	67.99%	12,198	28.50%	1,500	3.50%
Perry	18,809	73.46%	5,991	23.40%	805	3.14%
Philadelphia	136,844	20.24%	517,964	76.63%	21,141	3.13%
Pike	20,660	60.36%	12,437	36.34%	1,131	3.31%
Potter	7,120	79.77%	1,505	16.86%	301	3.38%
Schuylkill	49,311	68.29%	20,411	28.27%	2,488	3.45%
Snyder	14,312	72.48%	4,846	24.54%	587	2.98%
Somerset	31,651	78.14%	7,928	19.57%	928	2.29%
Sullivan	2,634	71.69%	914	24.88%	126	3.43%
Susquehanna	15,599	70.88%	5,682	25.82%	727	3.31%
Tioga	15,979	75.15%	4,597	21.62%	686	3.23%
Union	13,012	62.34%	7,256	34.76%	606	2.90%
Venango	18,404	69.62%	7,086	26.80%	946	3.58%
Warren	14,298	69.76%	5,397	26.33%	801	3.90%
Washington	71,760	60.21%	43,990	36.91%	3,424	2.87%
Wayne	19,564	67.41%	8,603	29.64%	856	2.95%
Westmoreland	128,070	61.96%	72,703	35.18%	5,912	2.85%
Wyoming	10,069	67.66%	4,378	29.42%	434	2.91%
York	154,428	62.52%	85,102	34.45%	7,479	3.03%
Totals	3,496,679	50.81%	3,179,376	46.20%	206,314	2.99%

Counties that flipped from Democratic to Republican

- Bucks (largest city: Bensalem)
- Centre (largest city: State College)
- Erie (largest city: Erie)
- Lehigh (largest city: Allentown)
- Luzerne (largest city: Wilkes-Barre)
- Monroe (largest city: East Stroudsburg)
- Northampton (largest city: Bethlehem)

==== By congressional district ====
Sunday won ten of 17 congressional districts.

District	DePasquale	Sunday	Representative
1st	46%	52%	Brian Fitzpatrick
2nd	65%	31%	Brendan Boyle
3rd	85%	12%	Dwight Evans
4th	53%	44%	Madeleine Dean
5th	59%	38%	Mary Gay Scanlon
6th	51%	47%	Chrissy Houlahan
7th	46%	51%	Susan Wild (118th Congress)
7th	46%	51%	Ryan Mackenzie (119th Congress)
8th	45%	52%	Matt Cartwright (118th Congress)
8th	45%	52%	Rob Bresnahan (119th Congress)
9th	29%	68%	Dan Meuser
10th	44%	53%	Scott Perry
11th	36%	61%	Lloyd Smucker
12th	59%	38%	Summer Lee
13th	25%	72%	John Joyce
14th	33%	64%	Guy Reschenthaler
15th	29%	68%	Glenn Thompson
16th	36%	61%	Mike Kelly
17th	51%	46%	Chris Deluzio

== See also ==
- 2024 Pennsylvania elections

== Notes ==
Partisan clients
