= Stephen Barrar =

American politician

Steve Barrar

Member of the Pennsylvania House of Representatives from the 160th district
- In office January 7, 1997 – November 30, 2020
- Preceded by: Kathrynann Durham
- Succeeded by: Wendell Craig Williams

Personal details
- Born: May 25, 1954 (age 72) Darby, Pennsylvania
- Party: Republican
- Occupation: Prior small business owner, Township Commissioner
- Website: Pennsylvania State Representative Stephen Barrar

Military service
- Allegiance: United States
- Branch/service: United States Navy
- Years of service: 1974-1976

Stephen "Steve" Barrar (born May 25, 1954) is an American politician from Darby, Pennsylvania. He has served as a Republican member of the Pennsylvania House of Representatives for the 160th District from 1997 to 2020.

== Career ==
Prior to his election to the State House, Barrar served as an Upper Chichester Township commissioner from 1992 to 1996, and was board president from 1994 to 1996.

At the same time, he also ran a business he purchased in 1984, Twin Oaks Garden Mart. Barrar ran this retail garden center until 1997, when he closed the business to focus his energy on working as a full-time state legislator.

Barrar served as Republican Chairman of the House Veterans Affairs and Emergency Preparedness Committee.

In December 2019, Barrar announced that he will not seek re-election in 2020. Barrar criticized Tom Wolf's response to the coronavirus pandemic, stating "I think the governor needs to back off a little bit from the strict (idea) that he’s the only one who can decide when a county is going to go from red to yellow to green, and the county and legislators" should make that decision.

== Personal ==
Barrar is a graduate of Interboro High School. He is involved in several local and community groups, including the Chichester Business Association, Chadds Ford Business Association, Aston Business Association, Bethel VFW Post and the Concord Lodge No. 625. He was named an honorary member of the Military Order of the Purple Heart for his support of disabled veterans.

Pennsylvania House of Representatives
Preceded by Kathrynann Durham	Member of the Pennsylvania House of Representatives from the 160th district 1997–2020	Succeeded by Wendell Craig Williams
