= 2024 Pennsylvania elections =

- November 5, 2024
- Registered: 9,175,133
- Turnout: 77.1%

Elections were held in Pennsylvania on November 5, 2024. On that date, the Commonwealth of Pennsylvania held elections for President of the United States, U.S. Senate, U.S. House of Representatives, Pennsylvania State Senate, Pennsylvania House of Representatives, and various others.

The Pennsylvania Republican Party had a highly successful election, winning every statewide race at both the federal and state levels. They also defeated two Democratic incumbents, Susan Wild and Matt Cartwright, in the 7th and 8th congressional districts, respectively, securing a 10–7 majority in Pennsylvania's House delegation. In the US Senate election, three term incumbent Democrat Bob Casey Jr. was unseated by Republican Dave McCormick. Republicans retained control of the state Senate, Democrats maintained control of the state House while losing the popular vote.

The counties of Philadelphia, Montgomery and Bucks voted to count hundreds of misdated or undated ballots despite court ruling to the contrary. The Pennsylvania Supreme Court enforced the rare King's Bench power to intervene.

== Federal offices ==
=== President and Vice President of the United States ===
Incumbent Democratic vice president Kamala Harris and governor of Minnesota Tim Walz were defeated by the Republican ticket, former President Donald Trump and United States senator and Marine Corps veteran JD Vance. Trump won Pennsylvania with 50.37% of the vote to Harris's 48.66%.

Trump's victory comes after he was successfully able to flip key counties in the state, including Bucks County, Erie County, Monroe County, and Northampton County. He is furthermore the first presidential candidate to have the most votes cast for him in the state, overcoming the record held by Joe Biden.

=== U.S. Senate ===
Republican Dave McCormick defeated three-term incumbent Democratic senator Bob Casey Jr. in an upset victory. McCormick won with 48.82% of the vote to Casey's 48.60%.

This was Pennsylvania's closest Senate election since the passage of the Seventeenth Amendment, as well as the closest Senate election of the 2024 cycle.

=== U.S. House of Representatives ===
All 17 congressional districts in the United States House of Representatives from Pennsylvania were up for election in 2024, in which Republicans were successfully able to flip two congressional districts.

Republican challenger Rob Bresnahan was successful in defeating six-term Democratic representative Matt Cartwright in the 8th congressional district. In the 7th congressional district, Democratic representative Susan Wild was defeated by Republican state representative Ryan Mackenzie. The two defeats resulted in Republicans flipping control of the state's delegation to Congress in favor of Republicans.

== State offices ==
=== Executive offices ===
==== Attorney general ====
Attorney General Josh Shapiro, who was re-elected in 2020, was ineligible to seek a third term in 2024 due to term limits. However, Shapiro was elected governor in 2022 and resigned as Attorney General upon being sworn in. Michelle Henry was confirmed by the Pennsylvania State Senate on March 8, 2023 to serve out the remainder of Shapiro's term, and has indicated she will not seek election to a full term. On April 23, 2024, Democrat Eugene DePasquale and Republican Dave Sunday won their respective primaries to advance to the general election.

==== Treasurer ====
Incumbent Republican treasurer Stacy Garrity was elected in 2020 and sought a second term. On April 23, 2024, Garrity and Democrat Erin McClelland won their respective primaries to advance to the general election.

==== Auditor General ====
Incumbent Republican Auditor General Timothy DeFoor was elected in 2020 and will seek a second term. On April 23, 2024, state representative Malcolm Kenyatta and DeFoor won their respective primaries to advance to the general election.

=== Pennsylvania Senate ===
In the 2024 general election, 25 of 50 seats (the odd-numbered districts) in the Pennsylvania Senate were up for election, with Republicans maintaining their advantage.

=== Pennsylvania House of Representatives ===
In the 2024 general election, all 203 seats in the Pennsylvania House of Representatives were up for election. The Democrats held the chamber by an unchanged 102-101 margin.

== See also ==
- Elections in Pennsylvania
- Politics of Pennsylvania
- Political party strength in Pennsylvania
