= Mark B. Cohen =

American politician

Judge of the Philadelphia Court of Common Pleas
- In office January 2, 2018 – December 31, 2024

Member of the Pennsylvania House of Representatives from the 202nd district
- In office June 10, 1974 – November 30, 2016
- Preceded by: Eugene Gelfand
- Succeeded by: Jared Solomon

Democratic Whip of the Pennsylvania House of Representatives
- In office January 5, 1993 – November 30, 1994
- Preceded by: Ivan Itkin
- Succeeded by: Ivan Itkin

Personal details
- Born: June 4, 1949 (age 77) New York City, New York
- Party: Democratic Party
- Spouse: Mona Getzes Cohen
- Children: 1
- Education: University of Pennsylvania, Lebanon Valley College, Widener University School of Law
- Profession: attorney

Mark B. Cohen (born June 4, 1949) is a Democratic politician from Philadelphia, Pennsylvania. He represented District 202 in the Pennsylvania House of Representatives from June 10, 1974, until his defeat for reelection in the Democratic primary in 2016.

In 2017, Cohen ran for judge and won in both the primary and general election. On January 2, 2018, Cohen was sworn in for a 10-year term as a judge on the court of common pleas in Philadelphia.

== Early life and education ==
He was born in New York City, the oldest child of Florence and David Cohen.

Cohen attended Central High School of Philadelphia, graduating in 1966. He sent a letter on September 25, 1965 to civil rights movement leader Martin Luther King Jr., inviting King to speak at his school.

Cohen enrolled at the University of Pennsylvania, where he served as a features writer for The Daily Pennsylvanian and an officer of the Penn affiliate of the College Democrats of America. Cohen graduated in 1970 with a degree in political science.

Cohen earned a law degree from the Harrisburg campus of the Widener University School of Law (now known as Widener University Commonwealth Law School) in 1993 and an M.B.A. from Lebanon Valley College in 2000. As an active member of the Pennsylvania Bar, he is qualified in the practice of law in Pennsylvania. He is admitted to practice before the Supreme Court of Pennsylvania, the United States district courts for Pennsylvania, the United States Court of Appeals for the Third Circuit, and the US Supreme Court.

== Pennsylvania House of Representatives ==
=== Original election ===
Cohen was elected to the Pennsylvania House of Representatives in a special election on May 21, 1974. He was 24 years old. He was officially nominated for the special election as the Democratic nominee for the vacant House seat by the executive committee of the Democratic State Committee.

=== Early years in the House, 1974–1988 ===
Cohen sponsored legislation to enable an American citizen who was a foreign medical graduate to complete a 5th Pathway Program to receive a license to practice medicine in Pennsylvania. The 5th Pathway Program peaked nationally in 1979–1980, but ultimately the expansion of the programs offered by the Educational Commission for Foreign Medical Graduates led to its decline and eventual elimination by the Council on Medical Education of the American Medical Association.

Cohen was later appointed Secretary of the State Government Committee and as Chairman of the Public Utility Subcommittee of the Consumer Protection Committee.

To deal with plant closings, Cohen introduced state legislation similar to the federal Worker Adjustment and Retraining Notification Act. Cohen's 1977 bill provided for 75 days advance notice for plant closings. In 1979, he introduced House Bill 1251, the more comprehensive Employee Protection and Community Stabilization Act. His legislation helped lead to enactment of 60-day advance notice plant closing legislation by the City of Philadelphia, which, in turn, helped inspire the federal 60 day advance notice requirement enacted in 1988.

In 1983, Cohen became chairman of the House Labor Relations Committee, a position he held until 1990; during his tenure, he focused on increasing the minimum wage and protecting worker's compensation benefits. His efforts to raise Pennsylvania's minimum wage in accordance with rises in inflation, coupled with aggressive statewide organizing led by the Philadelphia Unemployment Project and Pennsylvania labor unions, helped lead to minimum wage increase bill signings by Governors Robert P. Casey in 1988 and Edward G. Rendell in 2006. A 1986 Labor Relations Committee study of the length of time it took injured workers to get worker's compensation benefits found that it took disabled workers an average of 10 months to get a decision on their eligibility. Cohen sought remedial legislation to deal with worker's compensation problems. The Pennsylvania Chamber of Commerce offered its own reform program. Ultimately, elements of both plans took effect. His chemical right to know legislation for workers and communities was signed into law by Governor Richard Thornburgh in 1984.

Cohen introduced House Resolution 313 on June 11, 1986, which established the Select Committee to Study the Feasibility of a Harrisburg Law School. After this resolution was approved by a 98 to 97 margin on June 18, 1986, Cohen chaired the committee, which strongly recommended that a Harrisburg law school be created, drawing the interest of Delaware Law School of Widener University. Delaware Law School did its own feasibility study, confirming the value of establishing a Harrisburg campus, gained funding from businessman John Vartan, and ultimately changed its name to Widener University School of Law. The law school opened in September, 1989, and graduated its first class of full-time students in May, 1992. The first evening class, of which Cohen was a member, graduated in 1993.

=== Middle years in the House, 1988–2002 ===
In 1990, Cohen was elected Democratic Caucus Chair, a position in which he served until 1992. He served as Majority Whip from 1993 to 1994 before returning to the position of Caucus Chair in 1995. He would serve as Caucus Chair until 2010.

Cohen introduced House Resolution 323 on April 25, 1990 which, upon its adoption by the state house, created the Select Committee to Study the Feasibility of a Harrisburg University. Speaker Robert W. O'Donnell appointed Cohen to chair the committee, which held hearings without producing a consensus and concluded that "further study" was needed. The Harrisburg University of Science and Technology was chartered in 2001 and opened in 2005. Its affiliate, SciTech High, opened in 2003.

=== Later years in the House and defeat ===
In 2008, he expanded the employment law rights of police officers after they had been engaged in a military deployment, by sponsoring legislation allowing them to return to work, even if they had been abroad during their required recertification tests.

In 2009, Cohen introduced a bill to legalize medical marijuana in Pennsylvania, saying that he believes it is time to get rid of a decades-old negative image surrounding marijuana and replace it with "a new, honest image." Hearings on the bill were held, but the bill did not attain enough support for the Health and Human Services Committee to call up the bill for a vote. Despite the lack of public hearings in 2011, Cohen's medical marijuana bill continued to gain public support. In 2016, legislation similar to Cohen's became law.

Cohen worked to see that human services programs were adequately funded in a period of budget cutting. He actively participated in the Department of Public Welfare's Appropriations Committee Budget Hearing.

In 2012, Democratic Leader Frank Dermody and House Speaker Samuel H. Smith announced Cohen's appointment for the 2013–2014 legislative session as Democratic Chairman of the Pennsylvania House State Government Committee.

In 2016, Cohen lost the Democratic primary for his House seat to Jared Solomon, a community organizer. Solomon had challenged Cohen in 2014, coming within 158 votes of unseating him. Cohen's alleged misuse of the per diem system had become increasingly controversial in Philadelphia, and Solomon used the issue to attack him. The 2016 rematch between Solomon and Cohen was notably acrid. One article suggested that Cohen's operatives had stolen Solomon's garbage in order to find embarrassing information. Cohen sued Solomon for libel over a flier that suggested that Cohen had "bought a second home in Harrisburg and billed us $30,000 for it," though Solomon argued that the allegation was truthful. Notably, Representative Brian Sims, who served on the State Government Committee with Cohen, endorsed Solomon, writing, "I don’t hate Mark Cohen but his behavior in the Capitol has been one of the most shocking surprises of my time there. Virtually every single person in the Capital has a story about Mark being lost in a bathroom or arguing with the plants or with the pictures on the wall." Cohen responded that he had "a nearly 100% attendance record on the House floor." Cohen lost the election by a large margin, receiving 43 percent of the vote to nearly 57 percent for Solomon.

== Philadelphia Court of Common Pleas ==
In 2018, Cohen returned to elected office with his election to the Court of Common Pleas. Despite being given a "Not Recommended" rating by the Philadelphia Bar Association, he won a seat on the court, albeit with the second-lowest number of votes among the victors.

In October 2024, Cohen was ejected from the bench and suspended without pay by the Pennsylvania Court of Judicial Discipline after it found that he had repeatedly made political postings on Facebook, even after being warned not to do so. Pennsylvania's judicial code forbids judges from political organizing or endorsements. Due to Pennsylvania's age limits on judges and Cohen's term being up in November 2024, Cohen will remain suspended for the entirety of his remaining term.

== Political positions ==
=== Public health ===
Cohen supported the legislative efforts to greatly reduce public exposure to second-hand smoke, and potential for damages from it, supporting both the legislation banning much smoking in restaurants that was enacted in 2008 and the more comprehensive ban previously proposed.

He was a sponsor and part-author of a chemical right to know bill signed into law by Governor Richard Thornburgh. Cohen helped expose the selling of tainted meat to McDonald's and testified before the U.S. House Subcommittee on Livestock and Poultry that U.S. food safety laws should be strengthened.

He was a force in the House behind Pennsylvania's Organ Donation Trust Fund. The law establishing it gave organizations specializing in organ transplantation hospital access to potential organ donors, set up a system of drivers' license identification for each potential organ donor, and publicized the need for organ donation. It became a national model, and the basis for a new national policy during the Clinton Administration.

To protect the health and safety of Pennsylvania public sector workers under the jurisdiction of the federal Occupational Safety and Health Administration, he introduced a proposed law creating a state-run OSHA system for state and local governmental employees.

=== Education reform ===
A backer of the establishment of charter schools in Pennsylvania, legislation he supported helped start three charter schools currently in his legislative district: Imhotep High School, Delaware Valley High School, and Tacony Elementary School.

=== Civil rights ===
Cohen was the first House member to introduce legislation to seek recognition of same-sex unions in Pennsylvania, bringing forth legislation for civil unions on April 22, 2010 (House Bill 2447) and, with ultimately 43 co-sponsors, on February 14, 2011 (House Bill 708). The bill was unsuccessful, and same-sex marriage was later legalized in Pennsylvania due to a federal court decision.

He supported the inclusion of gays and lesbians in Pennsylvania's Ethnic Intimidation and Institutional Vandalism Act.

=== Voting ===
He supports the rights of all citizens to vote, with or without government-issued photo identification.

He vocally criticized the proposed replacement of the winner-take-all allocation system for Pennsylvania's electoral votes by a system giving a candidate a single vote for each Congressional district carried, with just two votes for carrying Pennsylvania. Cohen wrote that the plan "unconstitutionally abridges the right to vote of Pennsylvania's minority citizens."

=== Other positions ===
In recent years, Cohen has brought pending state-level national issues to the Pennsylvania House, introducing bills establishing Pennsylvania's membership in the National Popular Vote Interstate Compact, legalizing medical marijuana, and allowing people to get civil unions in Pennsylvania.

Cohen opposes the castle doctrine, which allows citizens a broader legal defense for shooting others on their own property or their own workplace.

== National involvement ==
Cohen was an unsuccessful candidate for the Democratic nomination for the seat in the US House of Representatives held by Joshua Eilberg in 1978. He actively campaigned in 2003 for the Democratic nomination for the Congressional seat being vacated by Joseph Hoeffel to run for the US Senate, but withdrew his candidacy in January 2004 when it had become clear that Allyson Schwartz had more support than he did. After Schwartz announced her gubernatorial candidacy in 2014, Cohen filed with the Federal Election Commission as a congressional candidate, but quickly announced he had reconsidered and would not run for Congress. In 2016, he served as a delegate to the Democratic National Convention.

== Criticism ==
Cohen has faced a large amount of criticism for his use of government perks. Journalist John Baer dubbed him the "king of perks" for his use of per diems. In 1990, it was reported that Cohen used as much as $100,000 in per diems, including $11,000 for airline tickets, over a year and a half. Likewise, in 2004–05, he billed the state of Pennsylvania $28,200 for books. His use of per diems was used to attack him during the 2016 campaign that resulted in his losing his seat. The Pennsylvania Judicial conduct board filed a complaint against Cohen in the Pennsylvania Court of Judicial discipline for statements that Cohen made on his personal Facebook page. On May 3, 2024, the Court of Judicial Discipline ruled Cohen's posts violated a host of conduct rules by making politically charged posts on Facebook.

== Personal life ==
He and his wife Mona, a Philadelphia special education teacher and advocate for children with autism, have one daughter and reside in Northeast Philadelphia. He is Jewish.

== Awards and recognition received ==
Cohen was one of only two incumbent PA House members that the Southeastern Pennsylvania Chapter of Americans for Democratic Action on October 30, 2012 said "we strongly urge" voters to support.

He received an "Outstanding Service Award" from his legal alma mater, Widener University School of Law, in 2004.

He received an award from the Pennsylvania National Guard Associations in 1991, for drafting legislation providing benefits to reservists called to active duty in the Gulf and elsewhere.
