= Kathrynann Durham =

American politician

Member of the Pennsylvania House of Representatives from the 160th district
- In office January 2, 1979 – November 30, 1996
- Preceded by: Ralph Garzia
- Succeeded by: Stephen Barrar

Personal details
- Born: July 9, 1951 (age 75) Chester, Pennsylvania, U.S.
- Party: Republican

Kathrynann W. Durham (born July 9, 1951) is a judge on the Delaware County Court of Common Pleas and a former Republican member of the Pennsylvania House of Representatives, 160th district from 1979 to 1996.

== Early life and education ==
Durham was born in Chester, Pennsylvania and is a graduate of Widener University and Delaware Law School. She taught Spanish and English at Northley Jr. High School in Aston, Pennsylvania.

== Career ==
=== Pennsylvania House of Representative ===
Durham was elected as a member of Pennsylvania House of Representatives, 160th district in 1978. She was reelected eight times to two-year terms and served as Majority Chairman of the Consumer Affairs Committee. Other committee assignments include the Committee on Committees, Insurance, Ethics and the Pennsylvania Export Partnership Advisory Board.

Durham was not a candidate for reelection in 1997 and was replaced by Stephen Barrar.

=== Delaware County Council ===
Durham was elected to the Delaware County Council in 1997 and served until 2001.

=== Delaware County Court of Common Pleas ===
In 2001, Durham was sworn in as a member of the Delaware County Court of Common Pleas after her appointment to the bench by Pennsylvania Governor Tom Ridge. She was retained in 2011, and again in 2021, and her current term expires in 2031.

== Personal life ==
Durham is married and had one son. She resides in Concord, Pennsylvania.

Pennsylvania House of Representatives
Preceded by Ralph Garzia	Member of the Pennsylvania House of Representatives from the 160th district 1979–1996	Succeeded by Stephen Barrar
