= Ralph Garzia =

American politician (1921–2009)

Ralph A. Garzia

Member of the Pennsylvania House of Representatives from the 160th district
- In office January 3, 1975 – November 30, 1978
- Preceded by: Stanley Kester
- Succeeded by: Kathrynann Durham

Personal details
- Born: May 30, 1921 Marcus Hook, Pennsylvania, U.S.
- Died: January 14, 2009 (aged 87) Media, Pennsylvania, U.S.
- Party: Democratic

Ralph A. Garzia (May 30, 1921 – January 14, 2009) was an American politician who served as a Democratic member of the Pennsylvania House of Representatives, 160th district from 1975 to 1978. He was also on the city council and mayor of the borough of Brookhaven, Pennsylvania.

== Early life and education ==
Garzia was born in Marcus Hook, Pennsylvania and graduated from Eddystone High School in 1940. He joined the United States Army in July 1942 and served as a military police officer in the Rhineland and Central Europe during World War II. He worked as a realtor and an equipment operator at the BP Oil Corporation refinery.

== Career ==
Garzia was elected to the Pennsylvania House of Representatives for the 1975 and 1977 terms. He lost to Kathrynann Durham in 1979 and had unsuccessful campaigns for reelection in 1981 and 1987.

Garzia was elected to the city council and as mayor of the borough of Brookhaven, Pennsylvania.

== Personal life ==
Garzia is interred at the Immaculate Heart of Mary Catholic Cemetery in Linwood, Pennsylvania.

Pennsylvania House of Representatives
Preceded by Stanley Kester	Member of the Pennsylvania House of Representatives from the 160th district 1975–1978	Succeeded by Kathrynann Durham
