= Katayoun Copeland =

American lawyer and politician

Kat Copeland

District Attorney of Delaware County
- In office 2018–2019
- Preceded by: Jack Whelan
- Succeeded by: Jack Stollsteimer

Personal details
- Born: 1966 or 1967 (age 57–58); Upper Darby, Pennsylvania, U.S.
- Political party: Republican
- Education: Bryn Mawr College (BA); Temple University (JD)

Katayoun M. Copeland (born 1966/1967) is an American lawyer and politician who was an assistant U.S. Attorney in Philadelphia from 2019 to 2023. She was the district attorney of Delaware County, Pennsylvania from 2018 to 2019.

== Life ==
Copeland was born in Upper Darby Township, Pennsylvania to an Iranian mother and an American father. She was raised in Iran from 1973 to 1980. She graduated from The Baldwin School in 1985. She completed an undergraduate degree from Bryn Mawr College. She earned a Juris Doctor degree from Temple University Beasley School of Law.

In 1992, Copeland joined the Delaware County district attorney's office as an assistant district attorney in its trial division. She worked under the county's first female district attorney, Patricia Holstein. She later became chief of drug enforcement in 2000. In 2004, she became deputy district attorney. In 2011, Copeland joined the United States Attorney as a prosecutor of drug cases. She worked under Louis D. Lappen, the acting district attorney for the U.S. District Court for the Eastern District of Pennsylvania. In 2018, she returned to Delaware County as its district attorney. A Republican, she was selected by the county board of judges to succeed Jack Whelan. The term expired in 2019. She ran for election for a full four-year term in 2019 and was defeated in a close election by Democratic candidate Jack Stollsteimer. From 2019 to 2023, she served as an assistant U.S. Attorney in Philadelphia. In November 2023, Copeland announced her candidacy in the 2024 Pennsylvania Attorney General election.
