= Eugene Gelfand =

American politician

Member of the Pennsylvania House of Representatives from the 202nd district
- In office January 7, 1969 – January 7, 1974
- Preceded by: District Created
- Succeeded by: Mark Cohen

Member of the Pennsylvania House of Representatives from the Philadelphia County district
- In office January 5, 1955 – November 30, 1968

Personal details
- Born: June 17, 1919 Philadelphia, Pennsylvania, US
- Died: March 23, 1987 (aged 67) Center City, Philadelphia, Pennsylvania, US
- Party: Democratic

Eugene Gelfand (June 17, 1919 – March 23, 1987) was an American politician. He was a Democratic member of the Pennsylvania House of Representatives.
