= Stanley Kester =

American politician

Stanley R. Kester

Member of the Pennsylvania House of Representatives from the 160th district
- In office January 7, 1969 – November 30, 1974
- Preceded by: District Created
- Succeeded by: Ralph Garzia

Member of the Pennsylvania House of Representatives from the Delaware County district
- In office January 5, 1965 – November 30, 1968

Personal details
- Born: May 21, 1929 Wilkes-Barre, Pennsylvania, U.S.
- Died: June 22, 2020 (aged 91) Chester Township, Pennsylvania, U.S.
- Party: Republican

Stanley R. Kester (May 21, 1929 – June 22, 2020) was an American politician who served as a Republican member of the Pennsylvania House of Representatives Delaware County district from 1965 to 1968. Kester also served as a member of Pennsylvania House of Representatives, 160th district from 1969 to 1974.

== Early life and education ==
Kester was born in Wilkes-Barre, Pennsylvania and graduated from Upper Chester High School.

Kester served in the U.S. Army from 1947 to 1948 and 1950–1951.

Kester was a member of the Chester County Republican Committee Executive Board and also served as a justice of the peace and tax assessor for Delaware County from 1963 to 1964.

== Career ==
Kester was elected to the Pennsylvania House of Representatives in 1965 and served four consecutive terms. He served on the Legislative Budget and Finance Committee from 1969 to 1974. He lost reelection in 1974 to Ralph Garzia.

In 1997, Kester was elected to the Chester Township city council and served as chair.

Pennsylvania House of Representatives
Preceded by	Member of the Pennsylvania House of Representatives from the Delaware County district 1965–1968	Succeeded by District Disbanded
Pennsylvania House of Representatives
Preceded by District Created	Member of the Pennsylvania House of Representatives from the 160th district 1969–1974	Succeeded by Ralph Garzia
