= Pennsylvania House of Representatives, District 160 =

American legislative district

Pennsylvania's 160th State House of Representatives district
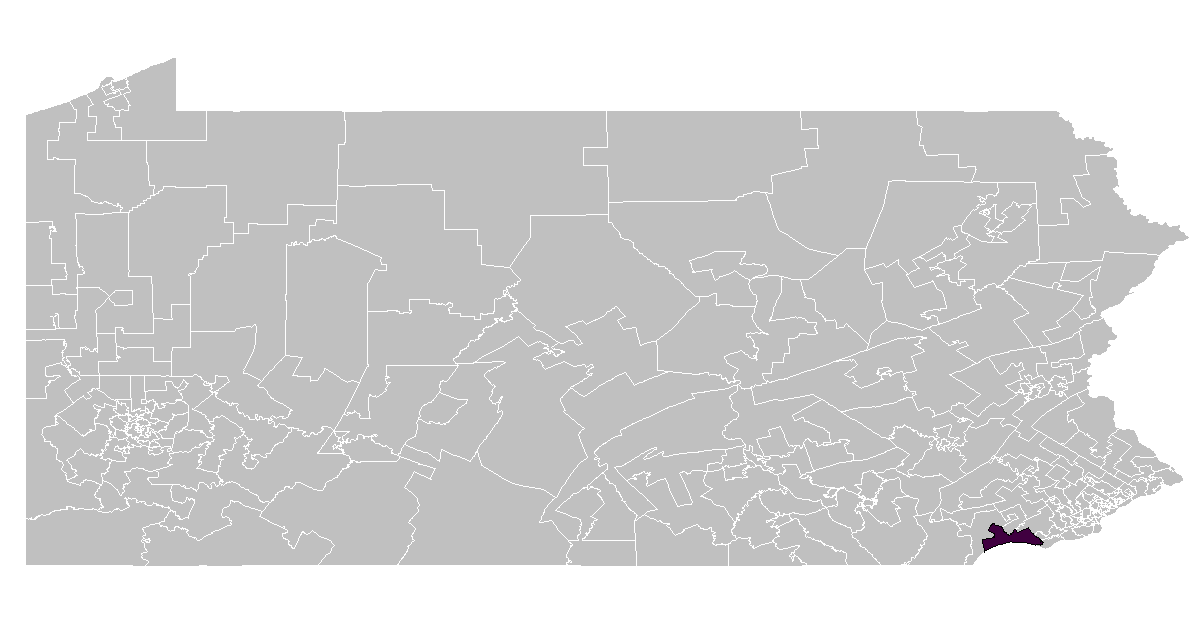
Representative
Craig Williams; R–Glen Mills
- Population (2021): 63,956

Pennsylvania House of Representatives District 160 includes parts of Chester County and Delaware County. It is currently represented by Republican Craig Williams.

== District profile ==
The district includes the following areas:

Chester County:

- Birmingham Township
- Pennsbury Township
- Thornbury Township
- Westtown Township

Delaware County:

- Bethel Township
- Chadds Ford Township
- Chester Heights
- Concord Township
- Thornbury Township

== Representatives ==
Representative	Party	Years	District home	Note
Prior to 1969, seats were apportioned by county.
Stanley R. Kester	Republican	1969 – 1974		
Ralph A. Garzia	Democrat	1975 – 1978		
Kathrynann Durham	Republican	1979 – 1996		
Stephen Barrar	Republican	1997 – 2020	Upper Chichester Township	Retired
Craig Williams	Republican	2021 – present	Glen Mills	Incumbent

== Recent election results ==
2022 election
Party	Candidate	Votes	%
Republican	Wendell Craig Williams (incumbent)	18,299	52.4
Democratic	Catherine Spahr	16,589	47.6
Total votes		34,888	100.0
Republican hold			

2020 election
Party	Candidate	Votes	%
Republican	Wendell Craig Williams	20,408	50.8
Democratic	Anton Andrew	19,798	49.2
Total votes		40,206	100.0
Republican hold			

2018 election
Party	Candidate	Votes	%
Republican	Stephen Barrar (incumbent)	15,880	51.3
Democratic	Anton Andrew	15,052	48.7
Total votes		30,932	100.0
Republican hold			

2016 election
Party	Candidate	Votes	%
Republican	Stephen Barrar (incumbent)	22,178	81.0
Independent	David Cleary	5,211	19.0
Total votes		27,389	100.0
Republican hold			

2014 election
Party	Candidate	Votes	%
Republican	Stephen Barrar (incumbent)	13,303	62.6
Democratic	Whitney Hoffman	7,944	37.4
Total votes		21,247	100.0
Republican hold			

2012 election
Party	Candidate	Votes	%
Republican	Stephen Barrar (incumbent)	28,201	100.00
Total votes		28,201	100.0
Republican hold			

2010 election
Party	Candidate	Votes	%
Republican	Stephen Barrar (incumbent)	18,568	66.8
Democratic	Nick DiGregory	7,911	28.4
Independent	David Cleary	1,334	4.8
Total votes		27,813	100.0
Republican hold			
