= Dave Sunday (politician) =

American politician and lawyer (born 1975)

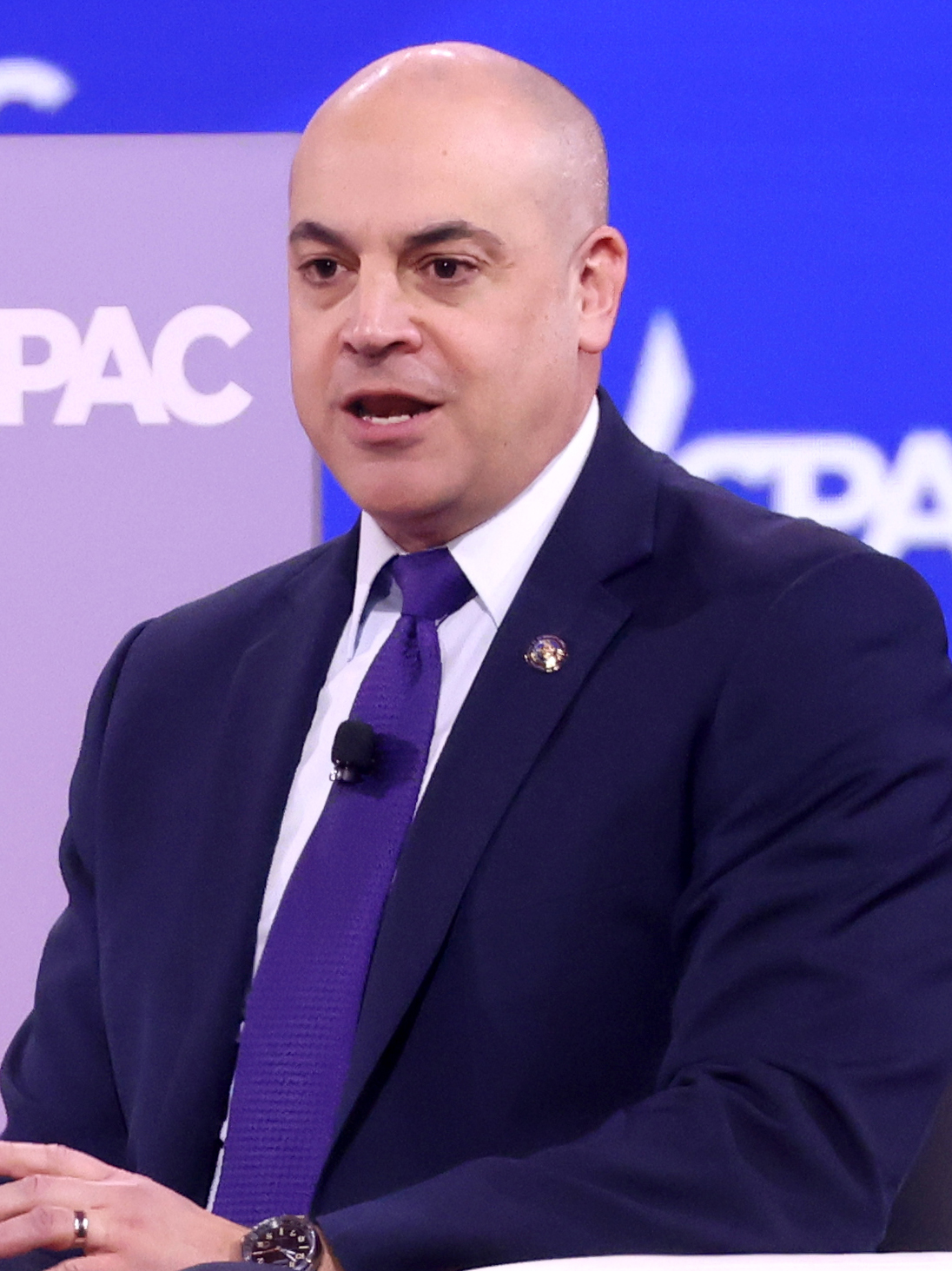
- Sunday in 2025

Attorney General of Pennsylvania
- Incumbent
- Assumed office January 21, 2025
- Governor: Josh Shapiro
- Preceded by: Michelle Henry

District Attorney of York County
- In office January 2, 2018 – January 17, 2025
- Preceded by: Tom Kearney
- Succeeded by: Tim Barker

Personal details
- Born: David Winslow Sunday Jr. June 13, 1975 (age 51) Harrisburg, Pennsylvania, U.S.
- Party: Republican
- Spouse: Lishani Senaratne
- Children: 1
- Education: Pennsylvania State University (BA); Widener University (JD)

David Winslow Sunday Jr. (born June 13, 1975) is an American politician and lawyer serving as the Pennsylvania attorney general since 2025. A member of the Republican Party, he previously served as district attorney of York County, Pennsylvania, from 2018 to 2025.

== Early life and education ==
Sunday was born on June 13, 1975, in Harrisburg, Pennsylvania. He graduated from East Pennsboro High School in 1993. Sunday enrolled at Harrisburg Area Community College, but dropped out to enlist in the United States Navy, where he served from 1995 to 1999. He then graduated from Pennsylvania State University and the Widener University Commonwealth Law School.

== Career ==
Sunday began his legal career as a law clerk for a judge in the York County Court of Common Pleas. He then joined the district attorney's office in York County, Pennsylvania in 2009.

In 2013, the U.S. Department of Justice appointed Sunday as a special assistant U.S. attorney for the Middle District of Pennsylvania. Sunday won the November 2017 election to serve as district attorney of York County, and took office in January 2018.

In July 2023, Sunday announced his candidacy in the 2024 election for Pennsylvania attorney general. He defeated state representative Craig Williams in the Republican primary election and defeated Democratic nominee Eugene DePasquale in the general election.

== Personal life ==
Sunday and his wife, Lishani Senaratne, have a son.

== Electoral history ==
2024 Pennsylvania Attorney General Republican primary election
Party	Candidate	Votes	%
Republican	Dave Sunday	620,515	70.36%
Republican	Craig Williams	261,419	29.64%
Total votes		881,934	100.00%

2024 Pennsylvania Attorney General election
Party	Candidate	Votes	%	±%
Republican	Dave Sunday	3,496,679	50.81%	+4.48%
Democratic	Eugene DePasquale	3,179,376	46.20%	−4.65%
Libertarian	Rob Cowburn	88,835	1.29%	−0.48%
Green	Richard Weiss	68,046	0.99%	−0.05%
Constitution	Justin Magill	31,282	0.45%	N/A
Forward	Eric Settle	18,151	0.26%	N/A
Total votes		6,882,369	100.00%	
Republican gain from Democratic				

Party political offices
Preceded by Heather Heidelbaugh	Republican nominee for Attorney General of Pennsylvania; 2024	Most recent
Legal offices
Preceded by Michelle Henry	Attorney General of Pennsylvania; 2025–present	Incumbent
