= Pennsylvania House of Representatives, District 202 =

American legislative district

Pennsylvania's 202nd State House of Representatives district
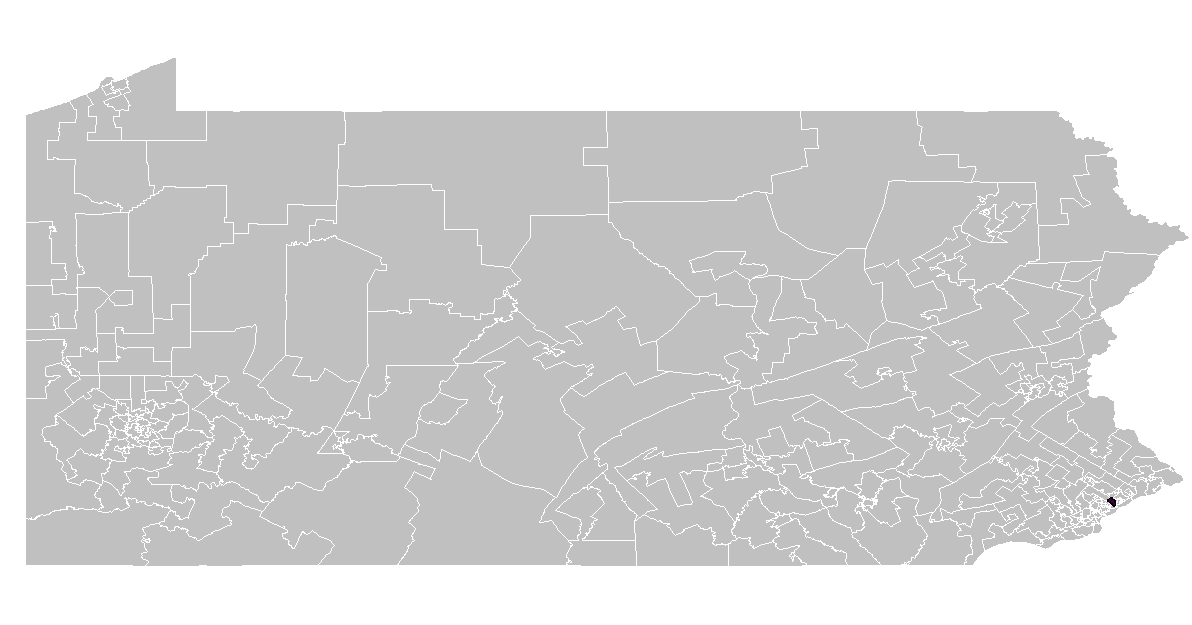
Representative
Jared Solomon; D–Philadelphia

The 202nd Pennsylvania House of Representatives District is located in Philadelphia County and includes the following areas:

- Ward 35 [PART, Divisions 01, 02, 03, 04, 05, 06, 07, 08, 12 and 32]
- Ward 53 [PART, Divisions 02, 03, 04, 05, 06, 07, 08, 09, 10, 11, 12, 13, 14, 15, 16, 17, 18, 19, 20, 21, 22 and 23]
- Ward 54 [PART, Divisions 02, 03, 04, 05, 06, 07, 08, 09, 11, 12, 13, 16, 17 and 18]
- Ward 56 [PART, Division 07]
- Ward 62 [PART, Divisions 13, 15, 16, 17, 18, 20, 21, 22, 23, 24, 25 and 26]

== Representatives ==
Representative	Party	Years	District home	Note
Prior to 1969, seats were apportioned by county.
Eugene Gelfand	Democrat	1969 – 1974		Resigned January 7, 1974.
Mark B. Cohen	Democrat	1974 – 2016		Elected May 21, 1974, to fill vacancy.
Jared Solomon	Democrat	2017—present		Elected November 8, 2016

== Recent election results ==
PA House election, 2022: Pennsylvania House of Representatives, District 202
Party	Candidate	Votes	%
Democratic	Jared Solomon	Unopposed	
Total votes		7,490	100.00
Democratic hold			
