= Craig Williams (Pennsylvania politician) =

American politician

Member of the Pennsylvania House of Representatives from the 160th district
- Incumbent
- Assumed office January 5, 2021
- Preceded by: Stephen Barrar

Personal details
- Born: Selma, Alabama, U.S.
- Party: Republican
- Spouse: Jennifer
- Children: 4
- Education: Duke University (BA); University of Florida (JD); Columbia University (LLM)

Military service
- Branch/service: United States Marine Corps
- Rank: Colonel
- Battles/wars: Persian Gulf War

Wendell Craig Williams is a member of the Pennsylvania House of Representatives for the 160th district and a former federal prosecutor. Williams served as a second lieutenant during the Persian Gulf War and retired from the United States Marine Corps as a colonel.

== Education ==
Williams received his bachelor's degree from Duke University in 1987, his J.D. degree from the University of Florida Levin College of Law in 1997 and his master's degree from Columbia University in 2001.

== Career ==
=== Marines ===
In 1987, Williams was commissioned as a 2nd lieutenant. During the 1991 Persian Gulf War, he flew 56 combat missions in the F/A-18D Hornet. In 1997, he became a Marine Judge Advocate and commanded law units at Marine Base Camp Pendleton, California. He left active duty in 2000 and joined the Marine Corps Reserves. In 2005, he was mobilized to active duty to serve as deputy legal counsel to the chairman of the Joint Chiefs of Staff. He retired at the rank of colonel in the Marine Corps.

=== Legal work ===
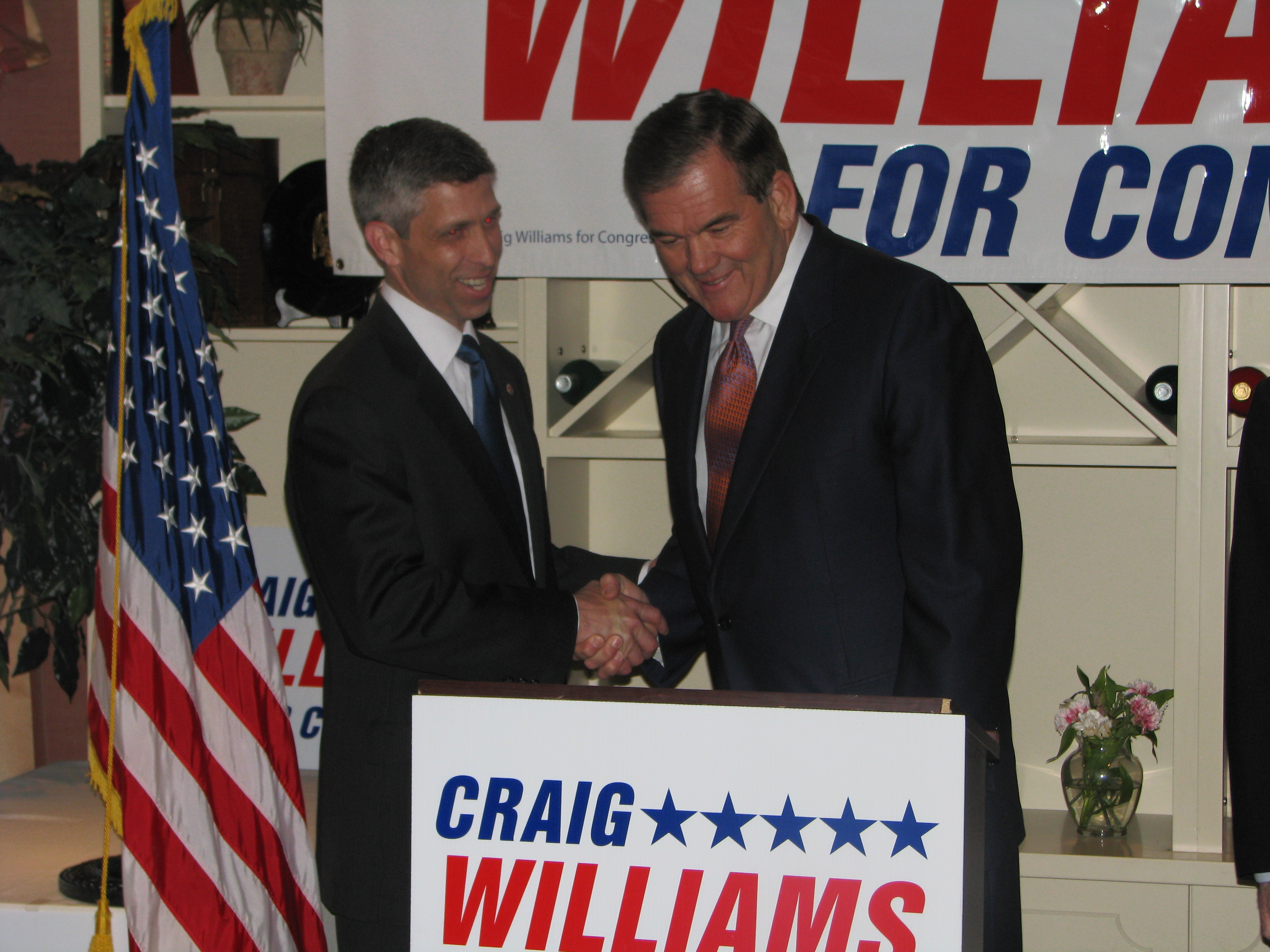
Williams with former Pennsylvania Governor Tom Ridge

Williams worked as Assistant General Counsel for PECO, as a federal prosecutor, and served on the Joint Terrorism Task Force. During active duty, he served as deputy legal counsel to the chairman of the Joint Chiefs of Staff. He clerked with the Honorable J.L. Edmondson, the chief judge of the United States Court of Appeals for the Eleventh Circuit. Williams has served as an assistant U.S. attorney in Colorado and Pennsylvania, and worked under former Chairman of the Joint Chiefs of Staff General Richard B. Myers and General Peter Pace.

=== 2008 congressional campaign ===
Williams announced his candidacy for the U.S. House of Representatives in Pennsylvania's 7th congressional district on January 16, 2008. He was endorsed by several organizations, including The Philadelphia Inquirer. He also received endorsements from, among others, vice presidential nominee Sarah Palin, Pennsylvania Senator Arlen Specter, former Pennsylvania Governor Tom Ridge and former New York City Mayor Rudy Giuliani, all of whom also campaigned for Williams. His campaign was ultimately unsuccessful, losing to the incumbent Joe Sestak.

=== 2020 House of Representatives campaign ===
Williams was elected to the Pennsylvania House of Representatives in 2020 to represent District 160. He was reelected in 2022 and 2024. One of his initiatives was securing a grant for a Project Safe Neighborhoods program aimed at increasing prosecution of gun violence. In 2022 he criticized Pennsylvania Attorney General Josh Shapiro for not using his full authority to prosecute gun crimes.

In 2026, Williams proposed the Pennsylvania Ratepayer Protection Act (House Bill 2372), which requires data center developers to construct or contract their own new electricity generation sources, as part of addressing rising electricity costs.

=== 2024 attorney general election ===
In November 2023, Williams announced his candidacy for the Republican nomination in the 2024 Pennsylvania attorney general election. He was refused endorsements from both the Republican Attorneys General Association (RAGA) and the Pennsylvania Republican Party, who both endorsed York County District Attorney Dave Sunday instead. The refusals came after Williams said before entering the race that he would earn the RAGA endorsement. He said the endorsements were the work of "Harrisburg insiders" propping up Sunday, "a[n] inactive prosecutor who is as progressive as Larry Krasner in Philadelphia". Williams lost to Sunday 70-30.

== Personal life ==
Williams lives in Glen Mills, Pennsylvania, with his wife, Jennifer Arbittier Williams, who is a former United States Attorney from the Eastern District of Pennsylvania.

Pennsylvania House of Representatives
Preceded by Stephen Barrar	Member of the Pennsylvania House of Representatives from the 160th district 2021–present	Incumbent
