= Jared Solomon (Pennsylvania politician) =

American politician

Member of the Pennsylvania House of Representatives from the 202nd district
- Incumbent
- Assumed office January 3, 2017
- Preceded by: Mark B. Cohen

Personal details
- Born: November 18, 1978 (age 47)
- Party: Democratic
- Spouse: Tiffani McDonough
- Education: Swarthmore College (BA); Villanova University (JD)

Jared G. Solomon (born November 18, 1978) is the representative for the 202nd District of the Pennsylvania House of Representatives. He is a member of the Democratic Party. A former Army Reserve JAG officer, Solomon is chair of the PA House Veterans Affairs and Emergency Preparedness Committee.

== Early life, education and early career ==
Solomon was raised above his great-grandparents’ butcher shop in Northeast Philadelphia by his single mother who taught special education at a public school. He attended Swarthmore College and Villanova Law School. After graduating, he practiced antitrust and securities law before serving in the Army Reserves as a JAG officer. From 2008 to 2016, Solomon founded and served as president of a local civic group in Northeast Philadelphia called Take Back Your Neighborhood. He lives with his wife Tiffani and their daughter Charlotte in the same neighborhood where he grew up.

== Political career ==
Following a defeat in the 2014 Democratic Primary against incumbent Mark B. Cohen, Solomon subsequently defeated Cohen in the 2016 Democratic Primary and then ran unopposed in the election for the 202nd District seat in the Pennsylvania House of Representatives.

Solomon has advocated for term limits, open primaries and recall elections. He also joined the Philadelphia Platform which called for an improved workforce development program, more aid to small businesses and neighborhoods, criminal justice reform and better infrastructure. He is currently chair of the PA House Veterans Affairs and Emergency Preparedness Committee.

In September 2023, Solomon announced that he would run for Pennsylvania Attorney General. During the campaign, Solomon vowed to protect abortion rights, strengthen labor, address consumer protection, tackle predatory housing businesses, fight anti-semitism in the form of a statewide task force and take on public corruption.

Solomon led the Democratic field for Attorney General in fundraising and received a slew of endorsements from VoteVets, the Pittsburgh Firefighters, Allentown Firefighters, Philadelphia Firefighters, SEPTA Transport Workers Union, United Food and Commercial Workers Local 1776, and 20 members of the state legislature.

Solomon lost the 5-way April 23, 2024 Democratic primary for Attorney General to Eugene DePasquale, coming in second place in Philadelphia, Montgomery, Franklin, Lebanon, Adams, Greene, York, and Fayette counties.

== Electoral history ==
=== 2014 ===
Pennsylvania House of Representatives, 202nd District Democratic Primary, 2014
Party	Candidate	Votes	%
Democratic	Mark Cohen (incumbent)	2,281	51.8
Democratic	Jared G. Solomon	2,123	48.2
Total votes		4,404	100.0

=== 2016 ===
Pennsylvania House of Representatives, 202nd District Democratic Primary, 2016
Party	Candidate	Votes	%
Democratic	Jared G. Solomon	5,111	56.93
Democratic	Mark Cohen (incumbent)	3,867	43.07
Total votes		8,978	100.0

Pennsylvania House of Representatives, 202nd District General Election, 2016
Party	Candidate	Votes	%
Democratic	Jared G. Solomon	18,371	100.0
Total votes		18,371	100.0

=== 2018 ===
Pennsylvania House of Representatives, 202nd District Democratic Primary, 2018
Party	Candidate	Votes	%
Democratic	Jared G. Solomon	2,361	100.0
Total votes		2,361	100.0

Pennsylvania House of Representatives, 202nd District General Election, 2018
Party	Candidate	Votes	%
Democratic	Jared G. Solomon	14,153	100.0
Total votes		14,153	100.0

=== 2020 ===
Pennsylvania House of Representatives, 202nd District Democratic Primary, 2020
Party	Candidate	Votes	%
Democratic	Jared G. Solomon	6,458	100.0
Total votes		6,458	100.0

Pennsylvania House of Representatives, 202nd District General Election, 2020
Party	Candidate	Votes	%
Democratic	Jared G. Solomon	18,116	100.0
Total votes		18,116	100.0

=== 2022 ===
Pennsylvania House of Representatives, 202nd District Democratic Primary, 2022
Party	Candidate	Votes	%
Democratic	Jared G. Solomon	2,348	100.0
Total votes		2,348	100.0

Pennsylvania House of Representatives, 202nd District General Election, 2022
Party	Candidate	Votes	%
Democratic	Jared G. Solomon	7,490	100.0
Total votes		7,490	100.0

=== 2024 ===
Pennsylvania House of Representatives, 202nd District Democratic Primary, 2024
Party	Candidate	Votes	%
Democratic	Jared G. Solomon	2,009	100.0
Total votes		2,009	100.0

Pennsylvania Attorney General Democratic Primary, 2024
Party	Candidate	Votes	%
Democratic	Eugene DePasquale	368,525	35.37
Democratic	Jack Stollsteimer	211,022	20.25
Democratic	Joe Khan	166,599	15.99
Democratic	Keir Bradford-Grey	158,915	15.25
Democratic	Jared Solomon	136,788	13.13
Total votes		1,041,849	100.0
