= Michelle Henry =

American prosecutor (born 1969)

Attorney General of Pennsylvania
- In office January 17, 2023 – January 21, 2025; Acting: January 17, 2023 – March 8, 2023
- Governor: Josh Shapiro
- Preceded by: Josh Shapiro
- Succeeded by: Dave Sunday

District Attorney of Bucks County
- In office January 4, 2008 – January 4, 2010
- Preceded by: Diane Gibbons
- Succeeded by: David Heckler

Personal details
- Born: c. 1969 (age 55–56)
- Party: Republican (formerly); Democratic
- Education: Allegheny College; Widener University (JD)

Michelle A. Henry (c. 1969) is an American prosecutor who served as the attorney general of Pennsylvania from 2023 to 2025. She was appointed by Governor Josh Shapiro to replace himself in the role. She previously served under Shapiro as first deputy attorney general. Henry formerly served as the district attorney of Bucks County, Pennsylvania from 2008 to 2010. She declined to run for election to a full term in the attorney general's office in the 2024 election and was subsequently appointed Pennsylvania Inspector General in 2025.

== Early life ==
Henry is a native of Greensburg, Pennsylvania, graduated from Greensburg-Salem High School, and interned with the Westmoreland County district attorney. She majored in communication arts with a focus on public speaking at Allegheny College and earned an undergraduate degree in 1992. Henry obtained her J.D. degree in 1994 from Widener University Commonwealth Law School. After graduating from Widener, Henry clerked for a judge in Lancaster County for a year and then began working for the Bucks County district attorney's office in 1996.

== Career ==
After Bucks County District Attorney Diane Gibbons was elected to the court of common pleas in 2008, Henry was appointed to serve the remaining two years of Gibbons's term by a majority vote of the county's 12 jurists. She declined to pursue election to a full term, but remained with the D.A.'s office as the first assistant district attorney. During her tenure, Henry headed the D.A.'s major crimes unit. While working for the Bucks County D.A., Henry would be brought in by Montgomery County D.A.'s office to prosecute cases that would have created a conflict of interest for the office. In 2016, Henry was tapped by the Montgomery County D.A. to successfully co-prosecute Pennsylvania Attorney General Kathleen Kane for misuse of office and perjury.

When Josh Shapiro was elected attorney general in 2016, he tapped Henry to be first deputy attorney general. After Shapiro was elected governor in 2022, Henry replaced Shapiro when he was sworn in on January 17, 2023. She was officially made attorney general by a unanimous confirmation vote in the Pennsylvania Senate on March 8. Before being confirmed, Henry stated she would not run for election in the 2024 election.

Henry has focused on child abuse cases throughout her prosecutorial career. In 1998, she became head of Bucks County's child abuse prosecution unit. She also helped launch Bucks County's Children’s Advocacy Center, a child abuse investigative and treatment nonprofit. Henry was named "Champion of the Year" by the Pennsylvania Court Appointed Special Advocates in 2023.

In 2024, Shapiro announced Henry would become Pennsylvania Inspector General on January 21, 2025.

== See also ==
- List of female state attorneys general in the United States

Legal offices
Preceded by Josh Shapiro	Attorney General of Pennsylvania; 2023–2025	Succeeded by Dave Sunday
