= George F. Pott Jr. =

American politician

Member of the Pennsylvania House of Representatives from the 28th district
- In office January 4, 1977 – November 30, 1986
- Preceded by: James Kelly
- Succeeded by: Elaine Farmer

Personal details
- Born: February 2, 1943 Pittsburgh, Pennsylvania, United States
- Died: September 5, 2001 (aged 58) Scott Township, Pennsylvania, United States
- Resting place: Trinity United Church of Christ, Pittsburgh
- Party: Republican
- Children: 2
- Education: Lafayette College (BA)
- Occupation: Accountant

George F. Pott Jr. (February 2, 1943 – September 5, 2001) was a Republican member of the Pennsylvania House of Representatives.

== Early life and education ==
George F. Pott Jr. was born to George F. Pott Sr. and Vera Margaret McKinney. His father was Republican chairman for Allegheny County and served on Eisenhower's staff during World War II. He had a brother, Richard W. Pott.

Pott attended Shady Side Academy, before graduating from Lafayette College in 1965 with a BA in economics.

== Career ==
Following his studies, Pott joined the Pittsburgh office of Price Waterhouse as a senior accountant. He began working at Schneider Sheet Metal Inc. as a comptroller in 1972, before starting his own accountancy practice in 1974.

In 1975, he ran for the position of county treasurer for Allegheny County. His opponent was the Democrat Edward F. Cooke, a political science professor at the University of Pittsburgh.

In 1976, he was elected to the Pennsylvania House of Representatives for the Republican Party, representing the 28th District. In the 1978 election, he was challenged by Frank J. Sacco Jr., the Democratic leader of Sewickley council.

During his time in office, Pott served in various positions and was a member of several committees:

- Member of the Appropriations Committee
- Member of the Urban Affairs Committee
- Member of the Legislative Budget and Finance Committee
- Chairman of the Legislative Audit Advisory Commission
- Member of the Governor's Council on Development Disabilities
- Chairman of the 10 State Eastern Region of the Council of State Governments
- Member of the Council's National Executive Committee
- Chairman of the Economic Affairs Task Force

In 1987, he ran against John Regoli to represent District 40 in the Pennsylvania State Senate. Pott's campaign manager was Bob Holste, who had originally been chosen to run for the seat.

== Political views ==
Pott was a self-described "moderate Republican". He voted for the death penalty, and against the use of state funds for abortion. He voted against lowering the legal drinking age, but supported the legalisation of private cannabis cultivation.

== Personal life ==
Pott and his wife Nancy had a son named Justin, who was born in 1973. Their other son was named Jeremy. Pott later remarried, his second wife being Sandra Lee Wood.

Pott died on September 5, 2001, after suffering from liver and kidney disease.
