= William Appleton =

William Appleton may refer to:

- William Appleton (Massachusetts politician) (1786–1862), American politician
- Will Appleton (1889–1958), mayor of Wellington, New Zealand
- W. A. Appleton (William Archibald Appleton, 1859–1940), British trade union leader
- William Sumner Appleton (1874–1947), founder of the Society for the Preservation of New England Antiquities
- William M. Appleton (1920–2001), Pennsylvania politician
- William Henry Appleton (1814–1899), American publisher
- William Appleton (entrepreneur) (born 1961), American entrepreneur and technologist
- William H. Appleton (1843–1912), American soldier and Medal of Honor recipient
- William Thomas Appleton (1859–1930), Australian businessman, shipping agent and public servant
