= Voter identification laws in Pennsylvania =

Laws have been made governing voter registration and voter identification (voter ID) in the U.S. state of Pennsylvania. Currently, only first-time voters are required to produce ID when voting in elections. A law passed in 2012 by the Pennsylvania State Legislature required all voters to produce ID. This law was overturned in 2014 in the Commonwealth Court on constitutional grounds.

== Current Pennsylvania voter laws ==
If a citizen consistently votes in Pennsylvania, they do not need to re-register before the next election except to update information such as address, name, party if anything has changed. In order to become a registered voter in Pennsylvania, one must obtain US citizenship at least one month prior to the election date, be at least 18 years old by the next election date, and live in the district they will be voting in for at least 30 days prior to the election date. Those in prison for a felony are not permitted to vote, but one can vote if they are on parole or probation. To be eligible to vote, one must complete registration a minimum of 30 days prior to the election.

Currently in Pennsylvania, no identification is required if it is not one's first time voting, and they should not be asked to provide any form of identification. If it is one's first time voting, or voting in a particular district, they will be required to show some form of identification. Acceptable forms of identification include: driver's license; US passport; military, student, or employee ID; voter registration card; firearm permit; current utility bill, bank statement, paycheck or government check; any other form of identification issued by the commonwealth or federal government. Although no documents are required to vote in Pennsylvania, voters are asked to provide their signature to verify with a signature kept on file.

== 2012 Voter ID law ==
On March 14, 2012, Republican Pennsylvania Governor Tom Corbett signed a Voter ID bill into law, after it had been passed by the Pennsylvania State Legislature. The Voter ID law would require everyone who sought to vote to have specified types of photo identification before they could vote. The bill was pushed for and passed by Republican legislators who claimed that the bill was imperative to preventing voter fraud. In 2012, the Voter ID law was one of the most prohibitive in the entire country.

Critics of the law claimed that this would prevent groups such as the older population and minorities from voting as they would be less likely to possess or be able to obtain the kinds of identifications specified by the law. This was substantiated in 2014 when a 2012 video of then Majority Leader Mike Turzai was leaked. In the recording, he described the passage of the Voter ID law as a successful plan to help Mitt Romney's chances of winning Pennsylvania in the 2012 presidential election. Critics also cited data from the Commonwealth that showed they had no evidence to corroborate the claim that voter fraud was a large issue as they had zero cases of a casting of a fraudulent vote on record.

=== Constitutional challenge ===
When the Voter ID bill was taken to court in 2012, it was initially upheld by Commonwealth Judge Robert Simpson. Judge Simpson did say that Mike Turzai's comments about the law concerned him, but despite his concern, he decided to uphold the law because regardless of what burdens it placed on people, the verbiage of the law and its implementation applied its stipulations to everybody in the state. He also argued that although he did see how it could impose upon the liberty of the voters, he felt that the actual purpose of the law was fair and outweighed the costs of its implementation. The decision was then appealed to the Supreme Court, but sent back to Simpson who then issued a decision saying that the law would not be implemented for the 2012 election.

The Voter ID law while technically in effect was not enforced at polling places in 2012. A group of civil rights and legal organizations banded together to contest the law in court. Their goal was to have the law struck down by the 2012 presidential elections, as they felt the law was more about Republican advantage than preventing voter fraud; however, the case was not decided until 2014. The official lawsuit was Applewhite v. Commonwealth of Pennsylvania. The group of rights organizations represented 10 plaintiffs, all of which would be prevented from voting in the 2012 presidential election if the Voter ID law would be allowed to remain in place. Vic Walczak, a representative from the Pennsylvania ACLU, argued on behalf of these plaintiffs and pointed out that people who will not be able to produce the necessary forms of identification mostly fit into two categories: annual income of less than $20,000 and not possessing a GED. Hispanics and women were also populations with large amounts facing difficulty with obtaining these proper forms of identification.

The case was heard by Honorable Bernard L. McGinley. McGinley declared the law to be unconstitutional, and that it placed unfair pressure on the rights of the citizen to vote and participate in elections as it required such specific forms of identification to cast a ballot, types of IDs that were not necessarily feasible for everyone to obtain or were equally accessible. He ruled that the law could not be put into action. In his opinion, he alluded to the fact that although the law did not specifically target people through its language, it would disenfranchise certain groups and people who had more trouble obtaining the necessary identification required under the law. McGinley also said in his decision that the state's argument that photo identification was necessary to prove people's identities and protect the elections did not clearly show a link between photo IDs and safer, better elections.

=== Fallout ===
The decision in Applewhite v. Commonwealth of Pennsylvania against the Voter ID law led to similar challenges to voter ID laws in Wisconsin, North Carolina, and Texas.

Although the 2012 Voter ID law in Pennsylvania had been struck down in 2014, people were still experiencing problems with being asked for identification beyond their voter card when they went to the polls for the 2016 presidential election. There were several reports from people across the state that they had been asked for some form of identification that was not required under law.
