= Emily Skopov =

American screenwriter and politician

Emily Skopov (born 1966) is an American screenwriter and politician.

== Personal life ==
Skopov was born in New York, and is of Jewish descent. She was raised in Rockland County. Skopov earned an undergraduate degree in English literature from Columbia University, and planned to become an English professor or lawyer before choosing to pursue her dream of screenwriting, which she studied in the Master of Fine Arts program at UCLA School of Theater, Film and Television. In 2010, Skopov moved to Pittsburgh, Pennsylvania, from El Segundo, California, then settled in Marshall Township with her husband and two children. Skopov is the founder of the non-profit organization No Crayon Left Behind. The organization was established in 2011, soon after Skopov began collecting discarded crayons from restaurants, along with other educational and art supplies, and distributing them to places where they would be used, such as homeless shelters, daycares, and preschools.

== Film and television ==
Skopov worked on several television shows including The Client, Xena: Warrior Princess, Pacific Blue, Crisis Center, and Andromeda. She left the crew of Farscape after six months due to the health challenges of a family member, but went on to write unproduced feature films for a Hollywood studio. Skopov began work on the 2006 film Novel Romance, which she directed and cowrote, shortly before her son was born.

== Political career ==
=== 2018 election ===
Skopov sought the District 28 seat in the Pennsylvania House of Representatives as a Democratic Party candidate in 2018. During her campaign, Skopov criticized incumbent legislator Mike Turzai for mounting several unsuccessful bids for higher electoral office. Turzai retained the seat, in the closest contest since he was first elected in 2001.

=== 2020 election ===
In August 2019, Skopov began her second campaign for the state legislature. Turzai announced his retirement from politics, then resigned his seat before the 2020 general election, and Skopov faced Republican candidate Rob Mercuri. Skopov positioned herself as a moderate Democrat.

Skopov was defeated in the general election. Following her defeat and the Democrats' failure to flip the state legislature, Skopov wrote on Twitter that she had been “a casualty/collateral damage of this offensively poor messaging,” referring to the Democratic Party's inability to defend moderate Democrats in swing districts against Republican attempts to inaccurately tag them with positions of supporting "socialism" and "defunding the police".
