= Le Cordon Bleu College of Culinary Arts in Boston =

Coordinates: 42°22′01.35″N 71°04′45.52″W

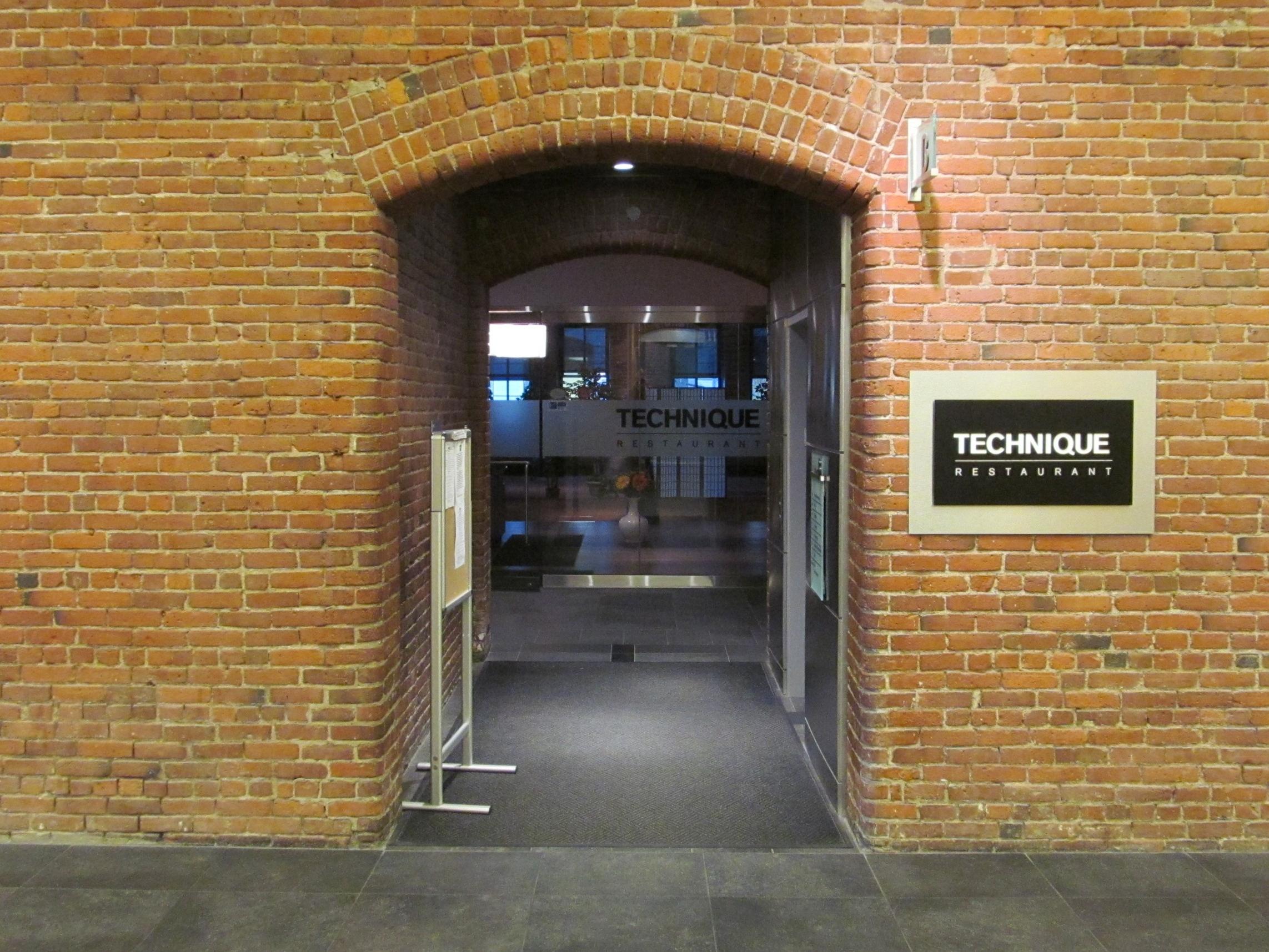
- Technique Restaurant at Le Cordon Bleu College
- Type: For-profit college
- Active: 2007–2017
- Location: 215 First Street, Cambridge, Massachusetts 02142, Cambridge, MA, USA
- Campus: Urban

Le Cordon Bleu College of Culinary Arts in Boston was established in 2007 in Massachusetts. The college was owned by Career Education Corporation under a licensing agreement with Le Cordon Bleu in Paris. All US Le Cordon Bleu College locations were scheduled to close in 2017.

== Programs ==
Le Cordon Bleu College of Culinary Arts in Boston offered the Associate of Applied Science Degree in Le Cordon Bleu Culinary Arts. LCB included a complete curriculum, with general education classes such as Math and English. The program was designed to be 12 months of coursework on campus, and then three months work in an externship. Graduates were prepared for entry- to mid-level positions including cook, apprentice chef, or kitchen manager in a variety of professional environments.

== Campus ==
Le Cordon Bleu College of Culinary Arts in Boston’s campus included lecture rooms, industrial kitchens, a library, computer labs, a full-service, student staffed fine dining restaurant, a student bookstore, and administrative offices.

== Accreditation ==
Le Cordon Bleu College of Culinary Arts, Inc., a private two year college, was accredited by the Accrediting Commission of Career Schools and Colleges of Technology (ACCSCT) to award the Associate in Applied Science degree.

The Massachusetts Board of Higher Education approved Le Cordon Bleu College of Culinary Arts, Inc., a private two year college, to offer the Associate in Applied Science Degree in Le Cordon Bleu Culinary Arts.

The College was associated with the American Culinary Federation and the Career College Association.
