= Novel Romance =

- Theatrical release poster
- Directed by: Emily Skopov
- Written by: Emily Skopov; Eddie Richey
- Produced by: John Scherer; Greg Spence
- Starring: Traci Lords; Paul Johansson; Sherilyn Fenn; Mariette Hartley
- Cinematography: Dave Klein
- Edited by: Matt Friedman; Kenn Kashima
- Music by: Raney Shockne
- Distributed by: Spotlight Pictures
- Release date: October 8, 2006
- Running time: 91 minutes
- Country: United States
- Language: English
- Budget: US$1.5 million

Novel Romance is a 2006 art-house romantic comedy film directed by Emily Skopov in her feature film directorial debut. It stars Traci Lords, Paul Johansson and Sherilyn Fenn. The film was shot in 2004 in Venice, Los Angeles, and premiered on October 8, 2006, at the 2nd Annual LA Femme Film Festival.

== Plot summary ==
The film follows Max Normane, a successful literary editor, who wants to have a child alone. She offers to publish Jake Buckley (Paul Johansson), a struggling writer, in exchange for his sperm for artificial insemination.

== Cast ==
- Traci Lords as Max Normane
- Paul Johansson as Jake Buckley
- Sherilyn Fenn as Liza Normane Stewart
- Mariette Hartley as Marty McCall
- Jacqueline Piñol as Isabelle
- Mikaila Baumel as Four-Year-Old Emma
- Pia Artesona as Rita Ramirez
- Tony Lee as Todd

== Festivals ==
Novel Romance was selected to screen at the following film festivals:

- 2006 LA Femme Film Festival (October 8, 2006)
- 2007 Other Venice Film Festival (March 17, 2007)
- 2007 Anthology Film Archives New Filmmakers Series (June 27, 2007)

== Awards ==
LA Femme Film Festival
2007: won Honorable Mention for Outstanding Achievement – Emily Skopov
