= Mike Turzai =

140th Speaker of the Pennsylvania House of Representatives (2015-2020)

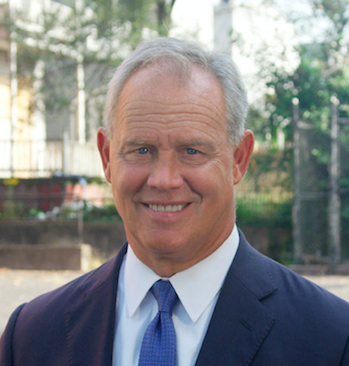

140th Speaker of the Pennsylvania House of Representatives
- In office January 6, 2015 – June 15, 2020
- Preceded by: Sam Smith
- Succeeded by: Bryan Cutler

Majority Leader of the Pennsylvania House of Representatives
- In office January 4, 2011 – January 6, 2015
- Leader: Sam Smith
- Preceded by: Todd A. Eachus
- Succeeded by: Dave Reed

Minority Whip of the Pennsylvania House of Representatives
- In office January 6, 2009 – January 4, 2011
- Leader: Mike Turzai
- Preceded by: Dave Argall
- Succeeded by: Mike Hanna

Member of the Pennsylvania House of Representatives from the 28th district
- In office July 12, 2001 – June 15, 2020
- Preceded by: Jane Orie
- Succeeded by: Rob Mercuri

Personal details
- Born: Michael Coyne Turzai; August 2, 1959 (age 67) Sewickley, Pennsylvania, U.S.
- Party: Republican
- Spouse: Lidia Turzai
- Education: University of Notre Dame (BA); Duke University (JD)

Michael Coyne Turzai (born August 2, 1959) is an American politician and former Republican member of the Pennsylvania House of Representatives who served as Speaker of the House. He is from Allegheny County and represented the 28th legislative district between 2001 and 2020. His district included the municipalities of Pine Township, Marshall Township, Bradford Woods, Franklin Park, and McCandless. Turzai served as the House Majority Leader from 2011 until 2015, and was elected Speaker in January 2015. He was a candidate for Governor of Pennsylvania in 2018 until he suspended his campaign in February 2018. He resigned from his House seat in 2020; after leaving office, he became general counsel for Peoples Gas, a subsidiary of Essential Utilities.

== Education and personal life ==
Turzai was born in Sewickley, Pennsylvania. He grew up in Moon Township and attended Our Lady of the Sacred Heart High School in Coraopolis. He earned a B.A. in English from the University of Notre Dame in 1981 and his J.D. degree from Duke University School of Law in 1987.

Turzai is married to Lidia Turzai, a pediatrician. They have three children and live in Marshall Township in Allegheny County.

== Early career ==
Turzai was an assistant district attorney for Allegheny County from 1988 to 1992, when he joined Houston Harbaugh, a law firm in Pittsburgh. He practiced law with Houston Harbaugh through 2004, and remains Of counsel with them.

Prior to serving in the legislature, Turzai served as the vice president of the Bradford Woods Borough Council. He was also a former representative to the Republican State Committee in 2000.

He is also a former member of the Pine-Marshall-Bradford Woods Police Board.

== Political career ==
=== 1998 U.S. House of Representatives election ===
In 1998 Turzai ran to represent the 4th District in the U.S. House against Democratic incumbent Ron Klink. He won the Republican primary by a large margin, with 54.25% of the vote to David F. Miller's 24.45% and Paul Adametz's 21.26%, but was defeated by Klink in the general election, 64-36%.He was strongly criticized by local media for hiring a helicopter to circle over his opponent's home, and for hiring a camera crew to ambush his opponent.

=== 2001 special election ===
In 2001 he was elected to the Pennsylvania House, winning every precinct in the 28th district against attorney Thomas Dancison in a special election to fill the seat of Jane Orie, who had replaced Melissa Hart in the state Senate in 2000.

In November 2010 Turzai was elected majority leader after the elections which gave the House a 21-seat majority by Republicans. He had also previously served as minority whip.

He was majority leader from 2011 to 2014.

Turzai was House Majority Leader in June 2011 when it passed the amended "Fair Share Act", a tort reform bill that largely repealed Pennsylvania's common law doctrine of joint and several liability.

On November 15, 2016, Turzai was chosen by House Republicans to be speaker-designee of the House of Representatives. On January 6, 2017, he was unanimously elected as Speaker of the Pennsylvania House of Representatives for a second term.

=== Committees ===
Because of his role as Speaker, Turzai sits on all committees in an ex-officio capacity. He actively serves on the Committee on Committees and the Committee on Rules.

=== Legislative ratings and endorsements ===
In 2017 Turzai was given a 91% rating by the National Federation of Independent Business (which endorsed him in October 2016) and an 80% rating by the American Conservative Union.

In 2016 he was given a 0% rating by the Sierra Club but a 25% rating by the Sierra Club PA. That same year he received a 92% rating by the Pennsylvania Chamber of Business and Industry.

The NRA Political Victory Fund endorsed Turzai in 2014 with an "A" rating. As of 2017 he holds a 93% NRA rating.

=== 2018 gubernatorial campaign ===
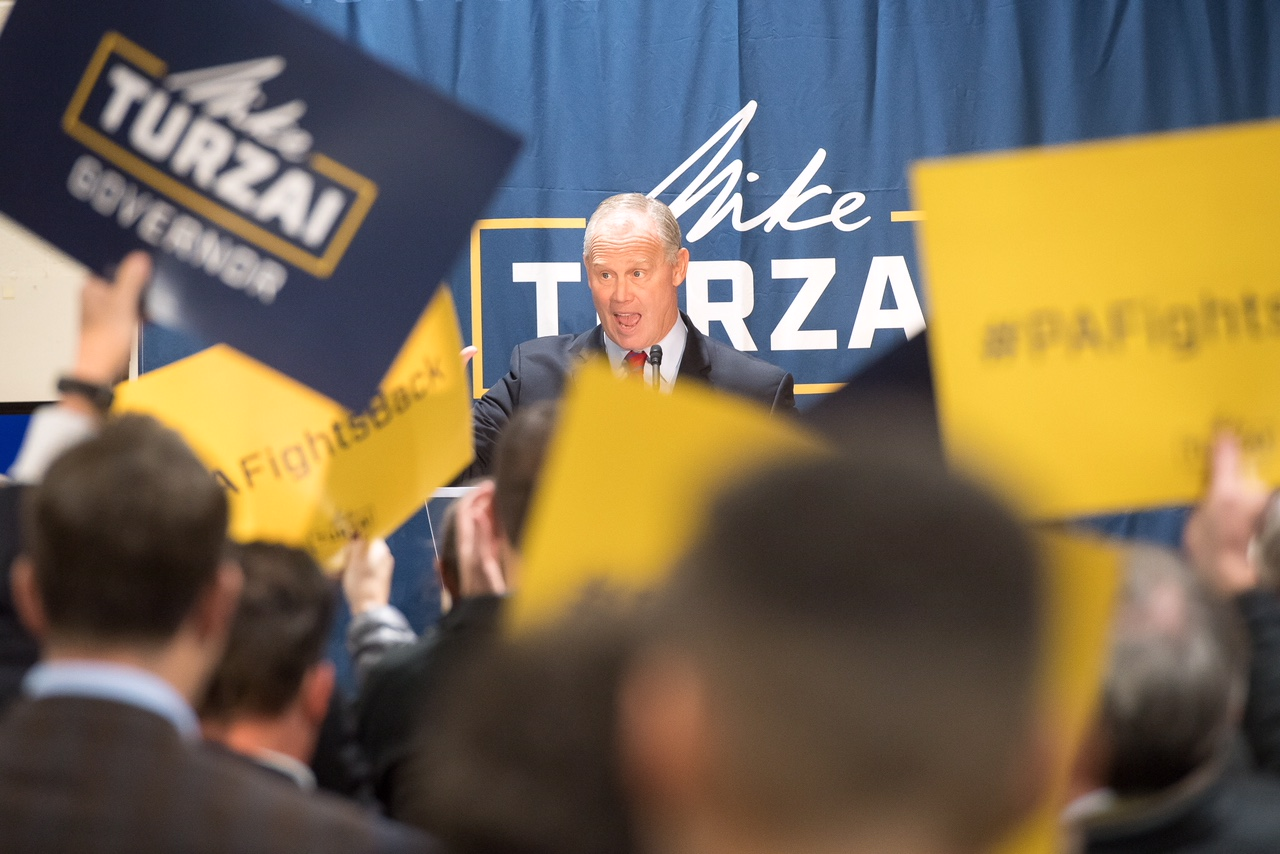
Turzai at a campaign rally

On November 14, 2017 Turzai officially announced he would run for governor in 2018, challenging Democratic incumbent Tom Wolf. Others in the Republican primary field included Scott Wagner, R-York; Paul Mango, a former health care director with McKinsey & Company; and Jones Day attorney Laura Ellsworth.

During the primary race Turzai also ran to retain his 28th District House seat, defending against Democrat Emily Skopov; had he won the primary, Turzai would have been required to vacate his legislative seat. He remained speaker throughout the election season.

During a campaign stop in December 2017, Turzai said as governor he would prioritize "Fiscal responsibility, a balanced budget, school accountability and increased investments in career and technical education." He said that if he was unable to bring about those changes during a first term, he would not seek a second term. State representative Kathy Rapp and state Senator Scott Hutchinson endorsed his candidacy with supporting remarks.

As of February 2018, Turzai had $1.2 million in his campaign account.

On February 10, 2018, Turzai announced to the state Republican Party Committee that he would no longer be running for governor, following the party endorsement of Scott Wagner.

=== Retirement ===
On January 23, 2020, Turzai announced from his district office that he would be retiring from office at the end of his current term, to seek opportunities in the private sector. Turzai later announced that he would retire on June 15, 2020, prior to the end of his term. One day after leaving office, Turzai was named general counsel for Peoples Natural Gas. At the time the appointment was announced, commentators noted Turzai's support of the natural gas industry while he served as a state representative.

== Issues ==
=== Cannabis ===
Turzai is vehemently against the legalization of medical cannabis in Pennsylvania. He was reported to break down in tears when discussing the subject in a meeting with the GOP caucus. Turzai is also fiercely opposed to legalizing adult-use cannabis in the state.

=== Education ===
In 2010, one of Turzai's top campaign contributors was the Pennsylvania State Education Association, which represents more than 187,000 Pennsylvania teachers and educators. The association gave him $22,500.

In September 2016 Turzai advocated increasing tax credits to Pennsylvania businesses that contributed to scholarship funds that help low income people send their children to private schools.

On October 26, 2017, Turzai publicly asked several public universities within Pennsylvania to freeze tuition for the 2018-2019 school year for in-state residents. The universities that he asked were the University of Pittsburgh, Penn State University, Temple University, and Lincoln University. After a state budget was passed at the end of October, those schools along with the University of Pennsylvania School of Veterinary Medicine stood to receive more than $600 million for the 2017-2018 fiscal year.

Also in October 2017, Turzai voted yes on HB 178 to amend the Pennsylvania Public School Code in various ways. Through his yes vote on the bill, Turzai supported: allowing school boards to suspend teachers for various reasons, including economic reasons, and that suspensions must be based on performance ratings; making schools practice armed intruder or terrorism drills; delaying the use of the Keystone Exams as a graduation requirement until the 2019-2020 school year; and requiring schools to provide a school meal to any student who asks for one, regardless of ability to pay. The bill also requires instruction on opioid abuse to students in grades 6-12.

In December 2016, Turzai announced that he would author a bill to increase tax credits for education. Specifically, his bill would "increase the amount of tax credits available under the Educational Improvement Tax Credit (EITC) program by $50 million (to $175 million) and the amount of tax credits available under the Opportunity Scholarship Tax Credit (OSTC) program by $25 million (to $75 million)." He said his purpose in introducing the legislation was to increase school choice and "help more students escape from failing schools."

Turzai introduced three education-related bills during the 2017 session:

- HB 202: Creates certain exemptions from the Keystone high school graduation exam for career and technical education (CTE) students. Passed the legislature and was signed into law on June 21, 2017, becoming Act No. 6.
- HB 250: Increases tax credits for certain state educational tax credit programs. Passed the House on March 13, 2017, but not signed into law.
- HB 700: Increases the number of seats in charter schools. The bill didn't pass either legislative chamber.

=== Guns ===
On April 1, 2008, Turzai voted against an amendment to HB 1845 (Reporting Missing Firearms). The amendment would have made it a summary offense, first degree misdemeanor, and then a third-degree felony (for each subsequent violation) for a person to fail to report a lost or stolen firearm to law enforcement within three days of discovering it missing.

On October 5, 2010, he voted in favor of HB 40 (Self Defense Law Amendments), which passed the House by a vote of 159-38. The bill would have expanded the sets of circumstances in which a person would be allowed to use force for self-defense.

In October 2014, Turzai voted in favor of HB 1243 (Authorizes Civil Action against Local Firearm Laws). The bill would have authorized "any 'individual adversely affected' by any firearm law enacted by a county, municipality, or township to seek declaratory or injunctive relief and actual damages in an appropriate court," according to Project Vote Smart.

=== Hate crimes ===
In 2017, Turzai cosponsored HR 161, "A Resolution condemning acts of hate and vandalism against the Jewish community."

=== Health care ===
During a campaign stop in 2017, Turzai said that growing jobs in the private sector is the key to providing people with good health insurance. "The private sector providing family sustaining jobs is the key to making sure our folks have good health benefits," he said.

=== Keystone Energy Enhancement Act ===
On December 20, 2016, Turzai introduced the Keystone Energy Enhancement Act, which he had sponsored in previous legislative sessions. The bill would set up 20 "Keystone Energy Enhancement Zones" across the state. Within these zones, natural gas, manufacturing, and petrochemical companies which operate within the zones would receive numerous tax deductions, exemptions, and credits for 10 years, as well as a $1,250 tax credit for each full-time job created within a zone.

=== Natural gas severance tax ===
Turzai has been opposed to a severance tax and impact fee on natural gas. During his campaign for governor, Tom Wolf pledged to tax Marcellus Shale. Turzai opposed Wolf's plan.

In July 2017, the Pennsylvania State Senate leadership proposed a tax that would vary based on market prices. In September 2017, a Pennsylvania House committee voted 15-11 along party lines to amend a bill to "rechristen" the impact fee that has been assessed on shale gas wells since 2012 as a severance tax. Turzai spoke at a news conference sponsored by opponents of the shale tax. He said that he is "steadfastly opposed" to the push for a vote on the bill as well as a vote on the severance tax itself.

At the end of October 2017, the state legislature passed a budget and sent it to Governor Wolf for his signature. The revenue bills as part of the budget did not contain a new tax on natural gas drilling companies, which the governor had wanted but Turzai opposed. However, after receiving the budget from the legislature, the governor continued to push for a natural gas severance tax. Earlier in 2017, the governor had proposed a 6.5% severance tax on natural gas production.

=== Privatization of liquor stores ===
In Pennsylvania alcohol is sold through a state-run chain of stores called Fine Wine & Good Spirits. The Pennsylvania Liquor Control Board owns and operates 600 of these stores throughout the state.

After being elected governor in 2010, Tom Corbett expressed his support of privatizing Pennsylvania's 621 state liquor stores and in January 2013 announced his proposal for privatization. In March 2013, Turzai introduced the legislation for Corbett's plan, HB 790, which would privatize the state-owned liquor stores with the state using the revenues for education.

On February 14, 2017, Turzai likened the enactment of state liquor reforms with taking Pennsylvania "into the 21st century and out of the era of Prohibition," referring to Act 39 which allowed for privatization of wine in private retail licenses, among other provisions. He announced that he would introduce legislation that would divest the state's wholesale system for both wine and liquor. Turzai supports eliminating the Pennsylvania Liquor Control Board's role in acting as the middle-man in wine and spirit distribution. He supports divesting state-controlled wholesale system of wine. He said, "Divestiture will "free the wine" by allowing retailers to negotiate pricing on products and by allowing them to have those products delivered directly to retail markets." Later he introduced HB 1075, which was passed in the House by a vote of 105-84 and was referred to the Senate Law and Justice Committee.

In April 2017, the Pennsylvania state House passed several bills, sponsored by Turzai, to privatize wholesale wine and spirits sales and expand alcohol retail outlets in Pennsylvania. The Patriot-News called Turzai "the leading voice for privatization in the Legislature."

Turzai introduced HB 975 which would divest the wholesale wine business from the Commonwealth and expand wine retail licenses. He also introduced HB 1075 which would divest the wine and spirits business from the Commonwealth. Both bills passed the state House on April 25, 2017.

=== State budget and taxes ===
As of October 2017, Pennsylvania has been in a "budget stalemate" since June between Pennsylvania state Senate and House Republicans and Democrats and Governor Tom Wolf. As of the end of September 2017, legislators and Governor Wolf were putting together a new proposal to solve the budget stalemate. House Republicans, led by Turzai, wanted to avoid raising taxes and instead expand legal gambling and use a one-time transfer of $630 million that would come from surpluses and special state accounts. As of October 1, 2017, legislators came to a tentative deal that would pass a revenue package (that would include a small expansion of gambling) that does not increase taxes.

On June 30, 2017, the state House overwhelmingly passed House Bill 218, a bipartisan budget agreement, which, according to Turzai, "answers the challenge to deal with a potential $3 billion shortfall and begins the process of reinventing Pennsylvania government." After the bill passed, Turzai said, ". . . this budget does not rely on onerous job-crushing tax hikes originally proposed by the governor. This bipartisan, no income or sales tax increase budget places priorities on core government functions . . ." Since 2001, Pennsylvania's general fund budget has grown from $20 billion per year to $31.5 billion. In an op-ed that Turzai published in Penn Live, he questioned, "Has government has become 50 percent more efficient? Have we increased our services by half? Certainly, family incomes haven't risen at that rate. Census calculations show median family income in our state rising by a mere 13.5 percent over the same time period." Turzai supports zero-based budgeting. The way he describes it is "a system in which we start from zero and build a budget according to what Pennsylvania - and its taxpayers - can afford."

=== State gambling ===
Turzai supported a 2013 bill, passed in the House, that would have approved an expansion of gambling in the state. According to Turzai, the fact that the bill would add money to the state budget was one of his reasons for supporting the issue.

The budget passed by the legislature at the end of October 2017 included a major expansion of legalized gambling, which Turzai supported and would bring in $200 million for the current fiscal year. According to the Pittsburgh Post-Gazette, "Gambling expansion had been a sticking point as legislators struggled to close the deficit that was more than $2 billion." The gambling bill allows the state to license 10 casinos that could have between 300 and 750 slot machines and 30 table games. It also allows some truck stops to have up to five video gaming terminals. Turzai led the negotiations for the budget, which passed the House by a vote of 109-72, sending it to the governor.

=== Transportation ===
Turzai supports investing taxpayer dollars into upgrading the state's infrastructure. In 2013, he introduced a bill that would have spent $900 million for "deteriorating highways, mass transit systems, and bridges," according to Ballotpedia.

=== Voter ID law comment and controversy ===
Speaking to the Republican State Committee on June 23, 2012, Turzai stated that Pennsylvania's new voter ID law would "allow Governor [Mitt] Romney to win the state of Pennsylvania" in the November 2012 U.S. Presidential election. He listed the goals that the majority-Republican legislature had achieved toward that end: "Pro-Second Amendment? The Castle Doctrine, it's done. First pro-life legislation—abortion facility regulations—in 22 years, done. Voter ID, which is going to allow Governor Romney to win the state of Pennsylvania, done." According to CBS Philadelphia, "Turzai's spokesman defends his boss's comment, saying Turzai meant that assuring voter integrity will make for a fairer election."

Turzai's comment heightened national debate and concern over whether the goal of the voter ID laws then being passed in Republican-controlled states was actually to check voter fraud or to set obstacles against "elderly, disabled, low-income people and the homeless, plus married women who have changed their names, transgender individuals, and students who have photo IDs that don't list an expiration date", in Pennsylvania an estimated 750,000 of whom were already registered voters, as acknowledged by the state. A lawsuit had been filed in April challenging "Act 18," the new law, signed in March, which amended the Election Code's definition of "proof of identification" to include only certain forms of ID as acceptable. Before the suit went to court in July, the state "signed a stipulation agreement with lawyers for the plaintiffs which acknowledges there 'have been no investigations or prosecutions of in-person voter fraud in Pennsylvania; and the parties do not have direct personal knowledge of any such investigations or prosecutions in other states.'" In August, in a statement praising the Commonwealth court for upholding Act 18, Turzai said, "It is unfortunate, but there has been a history of voter fraud in Pennsylvania. The elections in the Commonwealth will be on a more level playing field thanks to voter ID and other recent election reforms."

The plaintiffs appealed to the state supreme court, which vacated the lower court's decision and sent it back. Justice McCaffrey wrote, "While I have no argument with the requirement that all Pennsylvania voters, at some reasonable point in the future, will have to present photo identification before they may cast their ballots, it is clear to me that the reason for the urgency of implementing Act 18 prior to the November 2012 election is purely political. That has been made abundantly clear by the House Majority Leader.". That month during a Fox News debate with state senator Daylin Leach, Turzai claimed that the legislation, for which no Democratic representative had voted, had bipartisan support, and argued that it "is really just about presenting voter identification, which you do when you're buying Sudafed at a drugstore, or going to a place to buy beer, or to a gym, or going to an airport."

=== Voting ===
On September 26, 2017, Turzai voted in favor of HB 171, legislation that would allow any registered voter to be appointed a poll watcher in any district in the state. The legislation also requires that poll watchers must be registered electors and residents of the Commonwealth of Pennsylvania.

=== Water ===
In May 2017, Turzai announced he would introduce a bill to place the Pittsburgh Water and Sewer Authority (PWSA) under the oversight of the state's Public Utility Commission (PUC). He said that over the last year, the media had recounted several issues facing the residents of Pittsburgh with regards to the PWSA and water including incorrect billing, system leaks, and what he described as "non-compliance with federal water quality mandates." He later introduced his bill, HB 1490, on June 2 with state Rep. Harry Readshaw. The state House passed the bill by a vote of 195-0.

=== Wikipedia editing ===
Between 2013 and 2017 an editor or editors traced to the Pennsylvania House Republican caucus in Harrisburg repeatedly edited Wikipedia articles on Turzai and other Pennsylvania Republicans.

== Electoral history ==
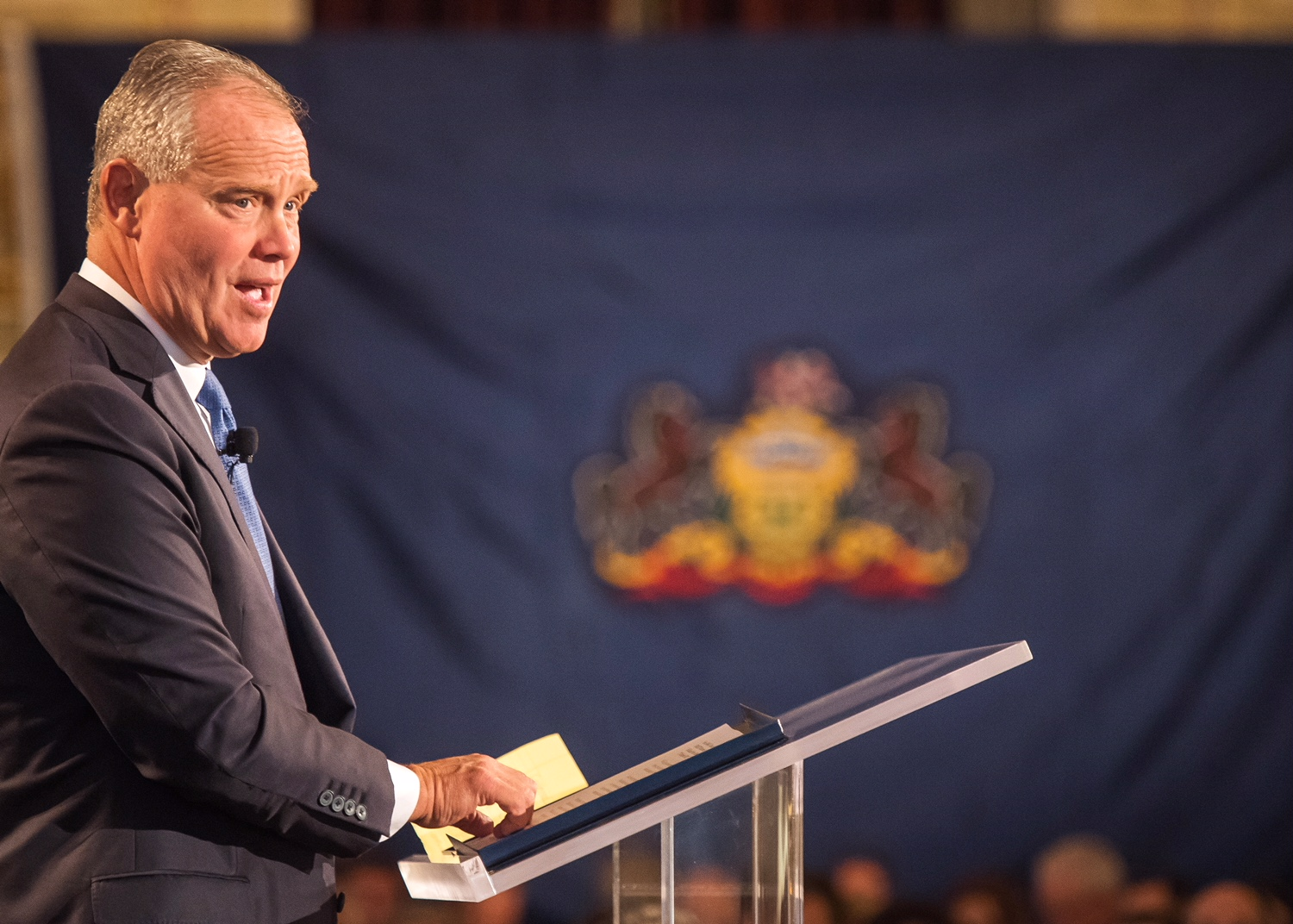
Mike Turzai delivering a speech

=== U.S. Congress ===
In 2012, Turzai was expected to announce a run for the U.S. Congress in Pennsylvania's then-new 12th congressional district. On January 25, however, he announced he had decided against running.

=== Pennsylvania House of Representatives ===
Pennsylvania’s 28th District House of Representatives election, 2016
Party	Candidate	Votes	%
Republican	Mike Turzai	24,327	65.25
Democratic	John Craig Hammond	12,958	34.75
Total votes		37,285	100

Pennsylvania’s 28th District House of Representatives election, 2014
Party	Candidate	Votes	%
Republican	Mike Turzai	17,146	100.00

Pennsylvania’s 28th District House of Representatives election, 2012
Party	Candidate	Votes	%
Republican	Mike Turzai	30,236	100.00

Pennsylvania’s 28th District House of Representatives election, 2010
Party	Candidate	Votes	%
Republican	Mike Turzai	21,943	77.24
Democratic	Sharon Brown	6,465	22.76
Total votes		28,408	100.00

Pennsylvania’s 28th District House of Representatives election, 2008
Party	Candidate	Votes	%
Republican	Mike Turzai	27,268	74.12
Democratic	Brad Cline	9,521	25.88
Total votes		36,789	100.00

Pennsylvania’s 28th District House of Representatives election, 2006
Party	Candidate	Votes	%
Republican	Mike Turzai	19,850	71.31
Democratic	John Henry	7,988	28.69
Total votes		27,838	100.00

Pennsylvania’s 28th District House of Representatives election, 2004
Party	Candidate	Votes	%
Republican	Mike Turzai	25,488	73.23
Democratic	Bradley Cline	9,317	26.77
Total votes		34,805	100.00

Pennsylvania’s 28th District House of Representatives election, 2002
Party	Candidate	Votes	%
Republican	Mike Turzai	16,802	100.00

=== Campaign finance ===
Based on campaign finance records, Turzai has raised a total of $7,440,095 for his elections.

- 2016: $2,599,751
- 2014: $727,061
- 2012: $1,240,179
- 2010: $1,119,234
- 2008: $897,998
- 2006: $369,196
- 2004: $238,078
- 2002: $248,598

== See also ==
- List of Pennsylvania state legislatures

Pennsylvania House of Representatives
Preceded by Todd A. Eachus	Majority Leader of the Pennsylvania House of Representatives; 2011–2015	Succeeded by Dave Reed
Political offices
Preceded by Sam Smith	Speaker of the Pennsylvania House of Representatives; 2015–2020	Succeeded by Bryan Cutler
