= Jason Altmire =

American politician (born 1968)

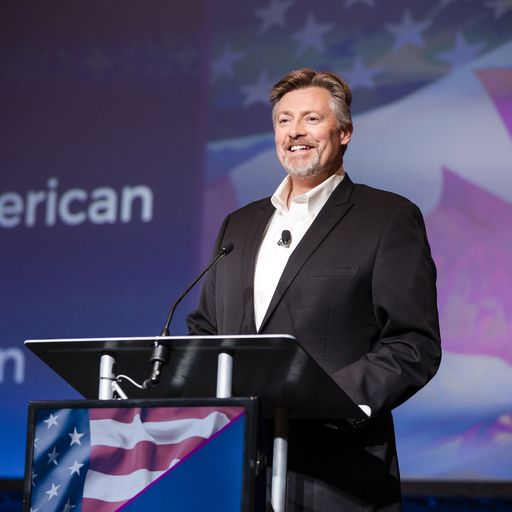

Member of the U.S. House of Representatives from Pennsylvania's 4th district
- In office January 3, 2007 – January 3, 2013
- Preceded by: Melissa Hart
- Succeeded by: Scott Perry (redistricted)

Personal details
- Born: March 7, 1968 (age 58) Kittanning, Pennsylvania, U.S.
- Party: Democratic
- Spouse: Kelly Altmire
- Children: 2
- Education: Florida State University (BS); George Washington University (MHA); University of Florida (DBA)
- Website: Official website

Jason Altmire (born March 7, 1968) is an American businessman, author, lobbyist and politician. He is the former Democratic U.S. representative for Pennsylvania's 4th congressional district, serving from 2007 until 2013.

Prior to entering Congress, Altmire worked as a healthcare industry lobbyist. Notably for a Democrat, he voted against President Barack Obama's landmark legislation, the Affordable Care Act. Since leaving Congress in 2013, he has worked for health insurance companies and health care business consulting firms. He currently serves as president of Career Education Colleges and Universities, the national trade association representing private career schools.

== Early life and education ==
Altmire was born in western Pennsylvania, where he was raised an only child in a single parent home. A record-breaking high school athlete, he set a school record in track and field and was recognized as an all-star wide receiver in football before a serious knee injury kept him off the athletic field as a senior. In 1986, he matriculated at Florida State University in Tallahassee. Following a lengthy rehabilitation of his knee injury, he tried out for and made the Seminole football team as a walk on, frequently working in practice against legendary defensive back Deion Sanders. He graduated in 1990 with a B.S. in Political Science and worked in the Tallahassee campaign office of Pete Peterson, then a candidate for Congress in Florida's 2nd congressional district. He later earned a Master's in Health Administration from George Washington University in Washington, D.C. In 2020, he completed a Doctorate in Business Administration from the University of Florida

== Early career ==
=== Politics ===
After Peterson won the 1990 congressional race against incumbent Republican Congressman Bill Grant, he hired Altmire to work in his Capitol Hill office. Altmire worked as a legislative assistant during Peterson's three terms in office (1991–1996), specializing in domestic policy issues. In 1993, Altmire was appointed to a working group for President Bill Clinton’s Task Force on National Health Care Reform.

=== Health care industry lobbyist ===
In 1996, when Peterson became the United States Ambassador to Vietnam, Altmire continued his work in health care policy by taking a job as a lobbyist for the Federation of American Hospitals. In 1998, Altmire returned to Pennsylvania to work as a lobbyist for the University of Pittsburgh Medical Center (UPMC). By 2005, he was the acting Vice President for Government Relations and Community Health Services.

== Elections ==
Altmire left UPMC in June 2005 to run for office in Pennsylvania's 4th congressional district against three-term incumbent Republican Melissa Hart, who was considered by most observers to be invulnerable. In May 2006, Altmire won the Democratic primary, defeating millionaire businesswoman Georgia Berner, 55% to 45%. In the general election, Altmire campaigned relentlessly and raised over $1 million to help fund his race against Hart. After polling well behind Hart early in the race, he eventually closed the gap heading into the final weeks before the election. Altmire defeated Hart, 52% to 48%. In 2008, Hart ran again in a rematch but was defeated by Altmire, 56% to 44%, even as Republican presidential nominee John McCain carried the district by almost 11 points.

In the historic 2010 wave election that saw Democrats lose 63 seats in the U.S. House, including five in Pennsylvania, Altmire survived. He was re-elected to a third term, defeating attorney Keith Rothfus, 51% to 49%. Following reappointment after the 2010 census, Pennsylvania lost one congressional seat. The Republican-controlled state legislature dismantled Altmire's district, merging most of its territory was with the neighboring 12th District, represented by fellow Democratic congressman Mark Critz, who defeated Altmire in the 2012 primary election, 51% to 49%. Critz went on to lose the general election to Rothfus, whom Altmire had defeated in 2010.

== Tenure in Congress ==
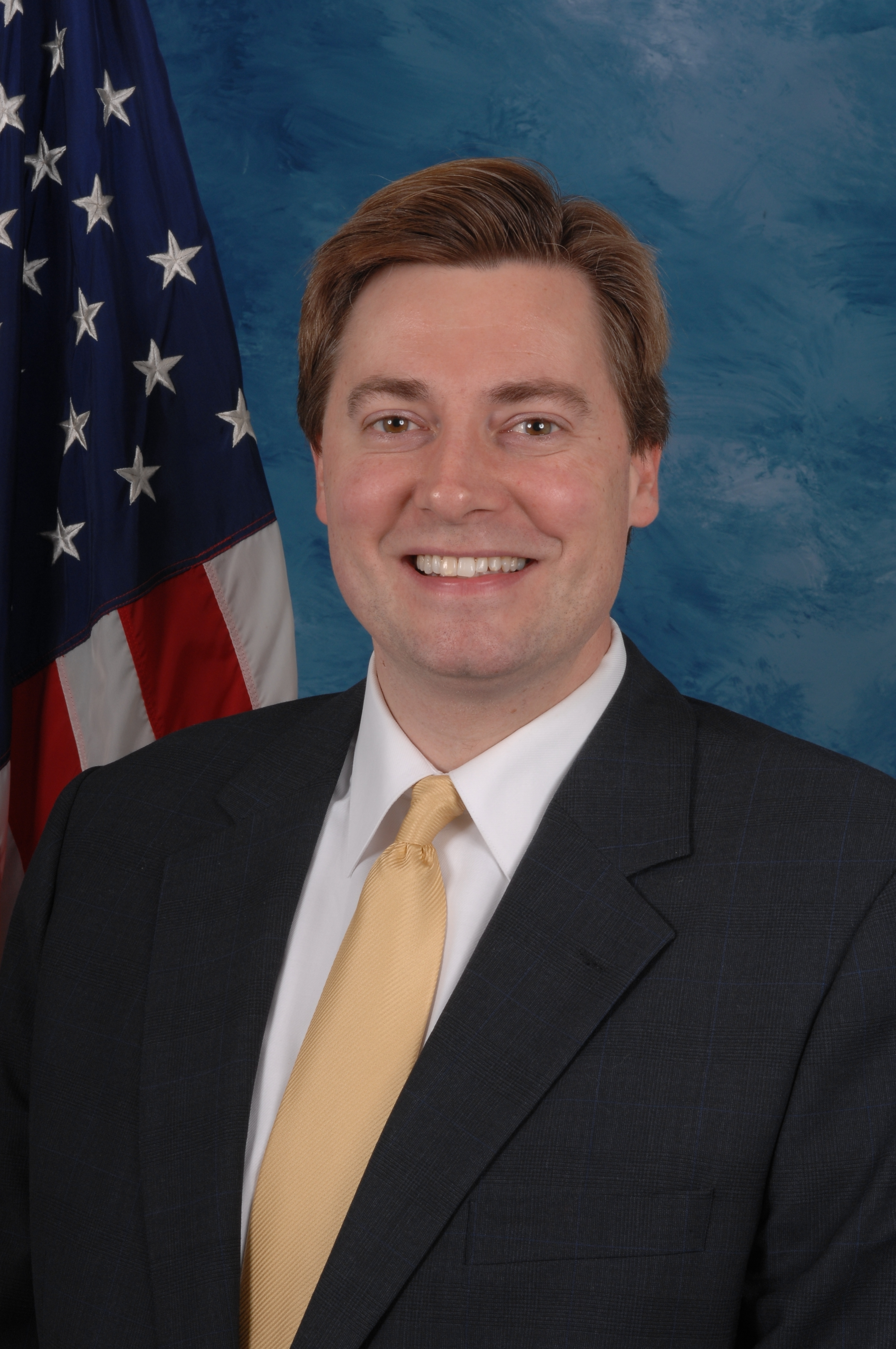
Altmire in the 110th Congress

A moderate Democrat, Altmire was ranked by the nonpartisan National Journal to have had the most centrist voting record in the House during his time in office. He did not miss a single vote in his first two terms and continued the unbroken voting streak into his sixth year in office, which was the longest House voting streak during that time. The streak finally ended at 4,734 consecutive votes when Altmire attended a White House ceremony for Leslie H. Sabo Jr., a former resident of Altmire's district who was posthumously awarded the Medal of Honor by President Obama. Over the course of his six years in office, Altmire returned more than $1 million in unspent office funds, citing a desire to lead by example and be a steward of taxpayer money.

Altmire successfully fought to guarantee the enlistment bonuses of combat-wounded veterans, and he forced a 2007 policy change allowing Vietnam War-era Gold Star families access to White House tours after a constituent was denied. His 2011 bill modernizing the charter of the American Legion achieved 432 cosponsors, the most ever for any congressional bill.

Altmire made several trips to the Middle East during his time in office, visiting U.S. troops and meeting with foreign leaders in Yemen, Iraq, and Israel, among other countries. He opposed the use of Chinese-made steel in the construction of the U.S.- Mexico border fence. In 2009, more than ten years before the global COVID-19 pandemic, he joined U.S. Senator Arlen Specter in leading a bicameral congressional hearing investigating the need for a national vaccine production center. Following the devastating 2010 Haiti earthquake, Altmire helped in the rescue of two constituents and the 54 orphans under their care. He also authored the legislation that ended the late enrollment penalty for low-income seniors participating in the Medicare Part D program.

During the 2008 presidential primary election, Democratic candidates Barack Obama and Hillary Clinton both sought Altmire's support as a superdelegate. Altmire did not endorse a candidate in the race and remained neutral throughout the primary. According to some Clinton biographers, this could be a reason why Bill Clinton campaigned against Altmire four years later, when the congressman was involved in a contested primary election of his own.

=== Affordable Care Act ===
President Obama with Altmire at the White House in March 2010

Altmire voted against the Affordable Care Act on March 21, 2010. He had also voted against earlier versions of the bill. His vote on final passage of the bill was highly sought after by President Obama and Democratic congressional leaders. According to Washington Post health care policy writer CeCi Connolly, "Altmire, more than most in Congress, understood the intricacies of health-care policy. As a congressional aide in the 1990s, he had worked on Clinton's failed effort and later became a hospital executive." Days before the vote on final passage of the bill, President Obama had personally tried to persuade Altmire, telling him "I want to give you something to think about before the vote. Picture yourself on Monday morning. You wake up and look at the paper. It's the greatest thing Congress has done in 50 years. And you were on the wrong team." After leaving Congress in 2013, Altmire became an executive at a Florida health insurance company and expressed support for the Affordable Care Act.

=== Subcommittee chairman ===
From 2007 to 2010, he served as chairman of the House Small Business Subcommittee on Oversight and Investigation, during which time he took the lead in passing through the House his legislation to help small businesses acquire private capital investment. As chairman, he introduced legislation to assist small businesses affected by deployments of employees serving in the United States National Guard. The bill garnered widespread bipartisan support and was signed into law by President George W. Bush in 2008.

=== Committee assignments ===
- Committee on Education and the Workforce
  - Subcommittee on Higher Education and Workforce Training
  - Health, Employment, Labor, and Pensions Subcommittee
- Committee on Transportation and Infrastructure
  - Subcommittee on Highways and Transit
  - Subcommittee on Railroads, Pipelines, and Hazardous Materials
  - Subcommittee on Water Resources and Environment
- Committee on Small Business
  - Subcommittee on Oversight and Investigations, Chairman 2007-2010

== Later career ==
In January 2013, Altmire began work as a lobbyist and public relations executive for the health insurance company Florida Blue. During his time there, he worked to implement of the Affordable Care Act in Florida. In 2015, he was appointed chairman of the Florida Blue Foundation, the philanthropy associated with Florida's Blue Cross Blue Shield Company. In August 2017, he left the company in order to promote his book, Dead Center: How Political Polarization Divided America And What We Can Do About It. In February 2019, Altmire was named a senior advisor to the health care consulting firm Avalere Health. In 2020, he was named president of Career Education Colleges and Universities, the national trade association representing private career schools.

Since leaving office, Altmire has remained active in civic and national affairs, serving on several boards, including the U.S. Global Leadership Coalition, college football's Outback Bowl, and the board of trustees at Jacksonville University. In 2014, he was appointed by Florida Governor Rick Scott to serve on the state's business and economic development board. He is a fellow of the European Institute for International Law and International Relations and an adjunct professor at the Texas Tech University Health Sciences Center.

In 2019, he helped to author a report published by the Center for the Study of the Presidency and Congress, recommending reforms to the American political system. He serves on the board of the political reform group Unite America and is a member of the Issue One ReFormers Caucus, a group of former members of Congress dedicated to civility in politics.

He and his wife, Kelly, have endowed a permanent scholarship at Florida State University, awarded annually to a health policy student “who demonstrates ambition and maturity through campus involvement and leadership, internships, employment, community service, faculty recommendations and/or overcoming significant challenges.“

== Books ==
Altmire, Jason, and Burr, Riley (2026) Trade Up: Why the Future Belongs to Skilled Trades and How Career Education is Transforming the Workforce, Sunbury Press, ISBN 979-8888194447

Altmire, Jason (2017) How Political Polarization Divided America and What We Can Do About It, Sunbury Press, ISBN 978-1620067543

== Archive ==
Altmire's papers and records from his time in public service are housed at the University of Pittsburgh. The collection includes nearly 36,000 files, consisting of official government publications, administrative files, travel files, constituent communications, correspondence, daily schedules, speeches, invitations, photographs, video, copies of legislation, memorabilia, talking points, congressional communications, committee hearing testimony, campaign materials, and press clippings. Altmire's congressional and campaign websites were selected by the Library of Congress to be included in its permanent historical collection on the U.S. Congress, and the websites’ contents from various points during Altmire's four congressional campaigns and tenure in office are archived there.

== Electoral history ==
2006 Democratic primary, Pennsylvania 4th congressional district
Party	Candidate	Votes	%
Democratic	Jason Altmire	32,322	54.86
Democratic	Georgia Berner	26,596	45.14

2006 United States House of Representatives elections in Pennsylvania
Party	Candidate	Votes	%
Democratic	Jason Altmire	130,480	51.92%
Republican	Melissa Hart (Incumbent)	120,822	48.08%

2008 United States House of Representatives elections in Pennsylvania
Party	Candidate	Votes	%
Democratic	Jason Altmire (Incumbent)	186,536	55.86%
Republican	Melissa Hart	147,411	44.14%

2010 United States House of Representatives elections in Pennsylvania
Party	Candidate	Votes	%
Democratic	Jason Altmire (Incumbent)	120,827	50.81%
Republican	Keith Rothfus	116,958	49.19%

2012 Democratic primary, Pennsylvania 12th congressional district
Party	Candidate	Votes	%
Democratic	Mark Critz (incumbent)	32,384	51.2
Democratic	Jason Altmire (incumbent)	30,895	48.8

U.S. House of Representatives
Preceded by Melissa Hart	Member of the U.S. House of Representatives from Pennsylvania's 4th congressional district 2007–2013	Succeeded by Scott Perry
U.S. order of precedence (ceremonial)
Preceded by Melissa Hart as Former U.S. Representative	Order of precedence of the United States as Former U.S. Representative	Succeeded by Pat Meehan as Former U.S. Representative
