= Chris Deluzio =

American politician (born 1984)

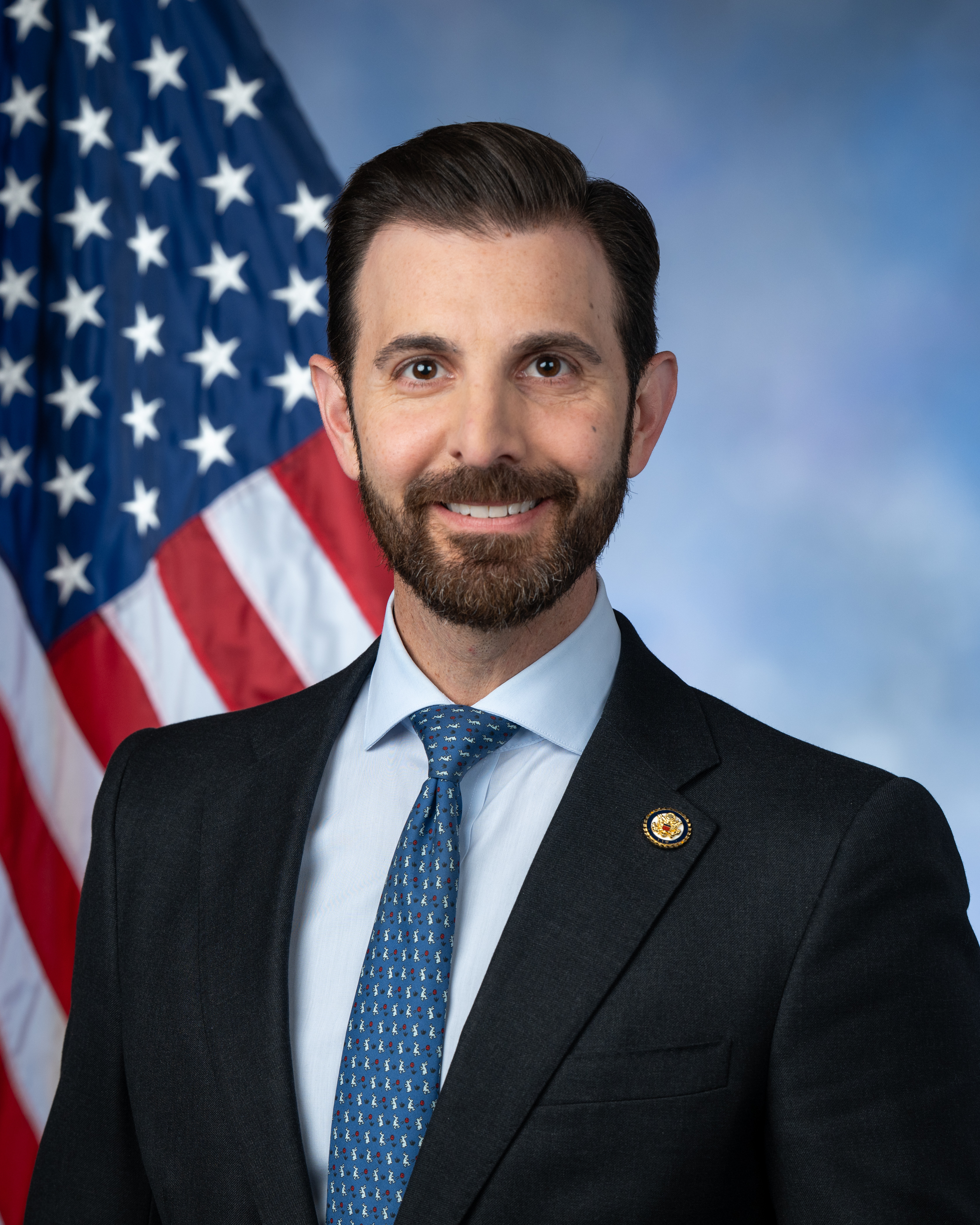
- Official portrait, 2025

Member of the U.S. House of Representatives from Pennsylvania's 17th district
- Incumbent
- Assumed office January 3, 2023
- Preceded by: Conor Lamb

Personal details
- Born: July 13, 1984 (age 42) Pittsburgh, Pennsylvania, U.S.
- Party: Democratic
- Spouse: Alexandra Zoë Bunnell (m. 2015)
- Children: 4
- Education: United States Naval Academy (BS); Georgetown University (JD)
- Website: House website Campaign website

Military service
- Allegiance: United States
- Branch/service: United States Navy
- Years of service: 2006–2012
- Rank: Lieutenant
- Unit: USS Higgins (DDG 76)
- Battles/wars: Iraq War

Christopher Raphael Deluzio (born July 13, 1984) is an American politician, attorney, and former U.S. Navy officer. A progressive Democrat, he serves as the U.S. representative for Pennsylvania's 17th congressional district since 2023. The district encompasses most of the northwestern suburbs and exurbs of Pittsburgh, and includes the entirety of Beaver County.

== Early life and education ==
Deluzio was born in Pittsburgh, Pennsylvania to Vincent and Rita Deluzio, and raised in Thornburg. His father owns a healthcare management consulting firm. He attended Bishop Canevin High School, where he played baseball. After graduation, he was admitted to the United States Naval Academy and earned a Bachelor of Science degree in 2006. Following his naval service, he attended Georgetown University Law Center, where he graduated magna cum laude with a Juris Doctor in 2013.

== Early career ==
After graduating from the Naval Academy, Deluzio served as a naval officer from 2006 to 2012, where he was a surface warfare officer and deployed to Iraq with an Army civil affairs unit. He later worked as a litigation associate at Wachtell, Lipton, Rosen & Katz in New York City before joining the Brennan Center of Justice to work on voting rights and election security issues. Deluzio was then named a legal and policy scholar of the University of Pittsburgh Institute for Cyber Law, Policy, and Security.

== U.S. House of Representatives ==
=== Elections ===
==== 2022 ====
Deluzio ran for the United States House of Representatives in Pennsylvania's 17th congressional district to succeed Conor Lamb in the 2022 elections. He won the general election, defeating Republican former Ross Township commissioner Jeremy Shaffer 53% to 47%.

==== 2024 ====
Deluzio defeated Republican state Representative Rob Mercuri in the 2024 election 54% to 46%.

=== Tenure ===
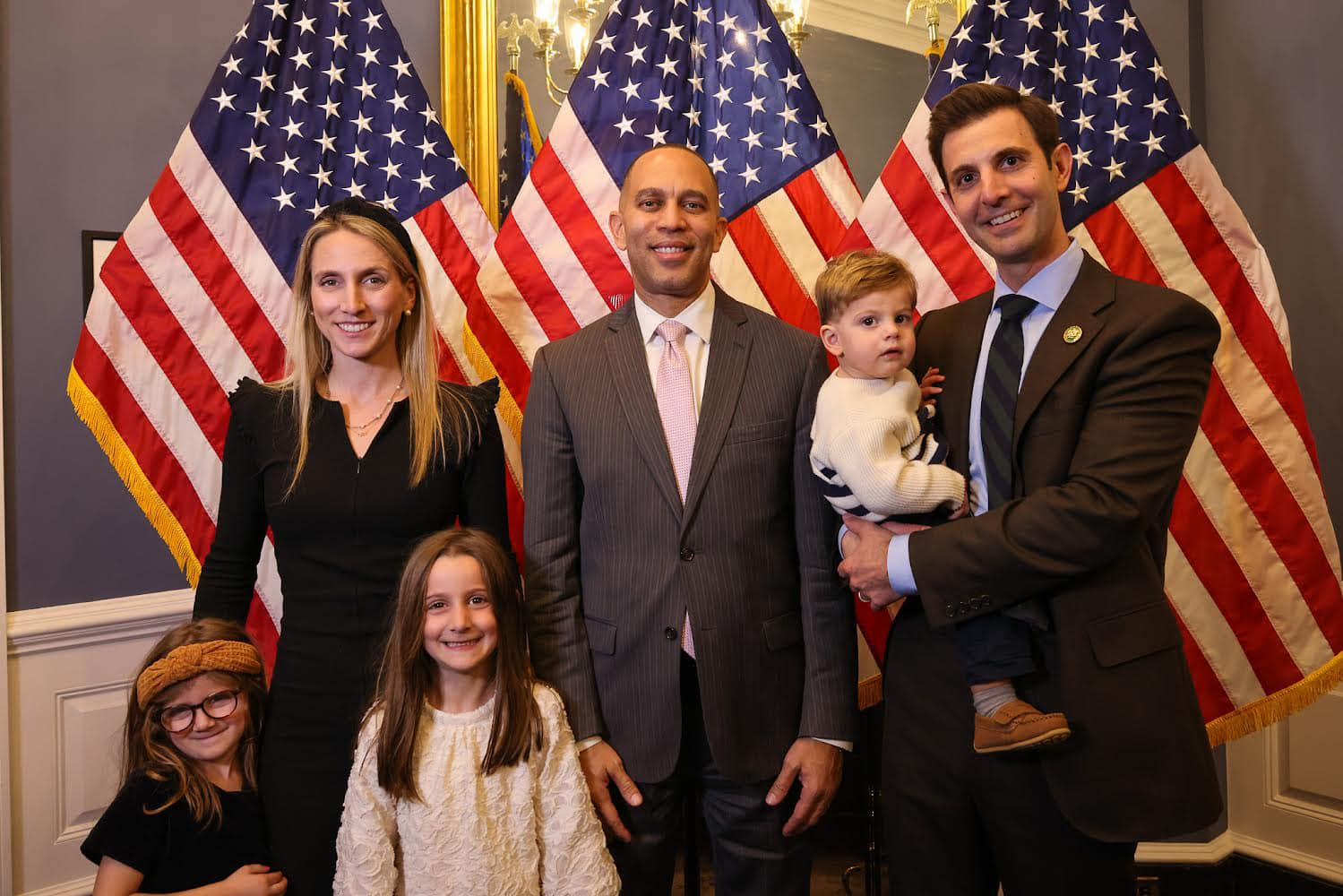
Deluzio with his family and House minority leader Hakeem Jeffries on his swearing in day to the 118th Congress, 2023

Deluzio was sworn into Congress on January 7, 2023, and appointed to the Armed Services and Veterans' Affairs committees for the 118th congressional session. In February, following the Norfolk Southern train derailment in East Palestine, Ohio, near his district, he partnered with Rep. Ro Khanna to introduce a bill tightening rail safety requirements for transporting hazardous materials. The following month, he introduced the House version of the bipartisan Railway Safety Act with Rep. Nick LaLota to strengthen regulations for freight rail. In May, he introduced the Build, Utilize, Invest, Learn and Deliver (BUILD) for Veterans Act to improve VA infrastructure and address unused buildings with long-term budget requirements.

In 2024, Deluzio co-sponsored the Shrinkflation Prevention Act with Rep. Marie Gluesenkamp Pérez to prevent corporations from reducing product sizes without lowering prices. In May 2024, he worked to ensure union labor agreements were implemented for the restoration of the Montgomery Lock and Dam, a project funded by President Joe Biden's Bipartisan Infrastructure Law (BIL), which was expected to create 28,000 construction jobs. The next month, he was appointed to the House Committee on Transportation and Infrastructure following the death of Rep. Donald Payne, because of his leadership on rail safety. In July, he joined House Democratic Leader Hakeem Jeffries at the Pittsburgh International Airport to highlight the impact of the BIL through its $1.5 billion modernization project.

In November 2025, Deluzio was one of six people, all Democratic lawmakers, to be part of a video telling servicemembers they can refuse illegal orders. In response later that month, President Donald Trump posted on social media calling those in the video, including Deluzio, traitors who should be charged with sedition punishable by death, and shared a social media post calling for them to be hanged.

=== Committee assignments ===
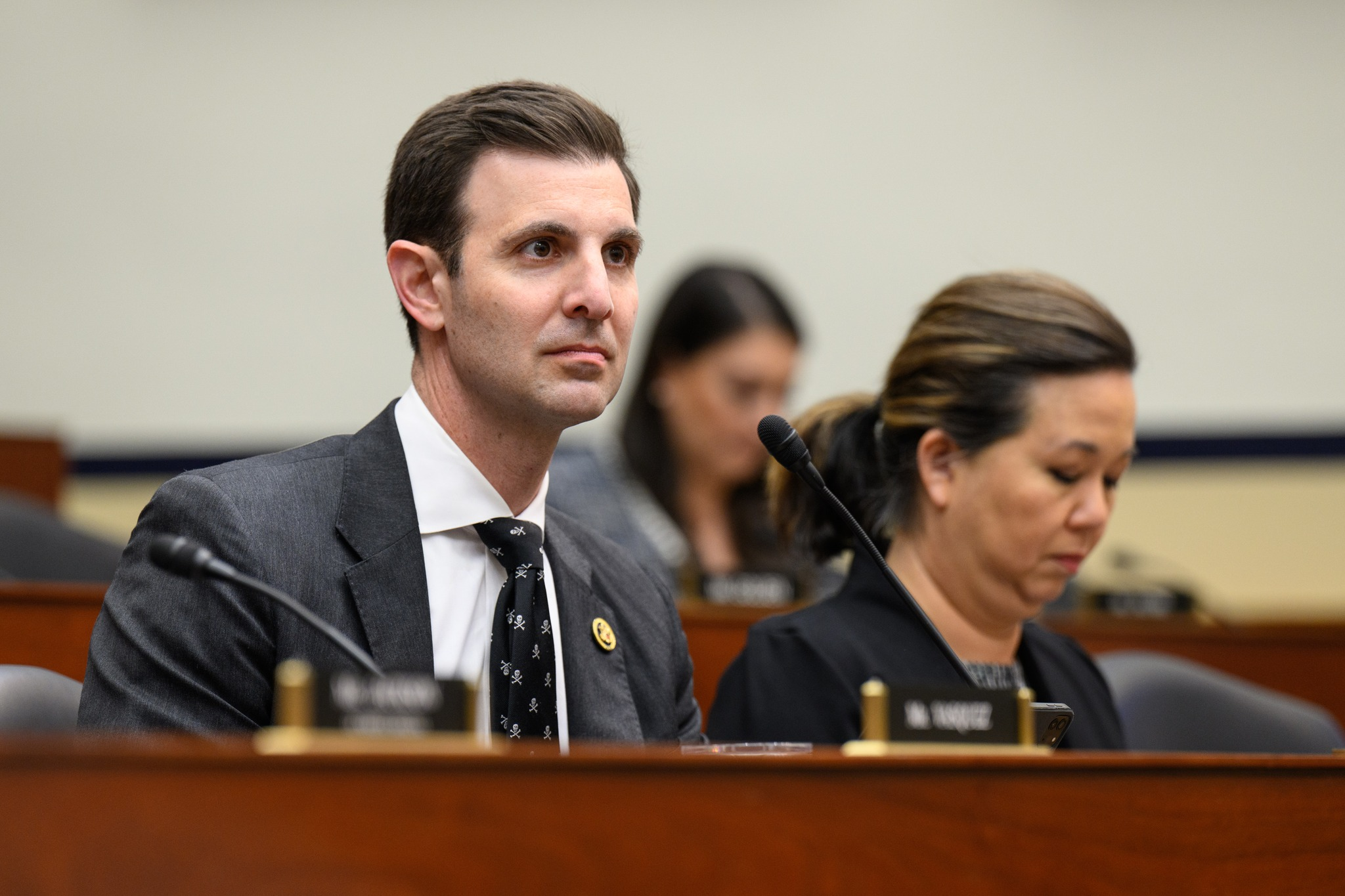
Deluzio on the Armed Services Committee, 2025

Deluzio's committee assignments for the 119th Congress include:

- Committee on Transportation and Infrastructure
  - Subcommittee on Aviation
  - Subcommittee on Railroads, Pipelines, and Hazardous Materials (vice ranking member)
- Committee on Armed Services
  - Subcommittee on Readiness
  - Subcommittee on Seapower and Projection Forces

=== Caucus memberships ===
Deluzio's caucus memberships include:

- Congressional Equality Caucus
- Labor Caucus (vice chair)
- Congressional Steel Caucus
- Congressional Progressive Caucus (deputy whip)
- Navy and Marine Corps Caucus, (co-chair)
- Bipartisan Fentanyl Prevention Caucus
- Future Forum
- Medicare for All Caucus
- Congressional Freethought Caucus

== Political positions ==
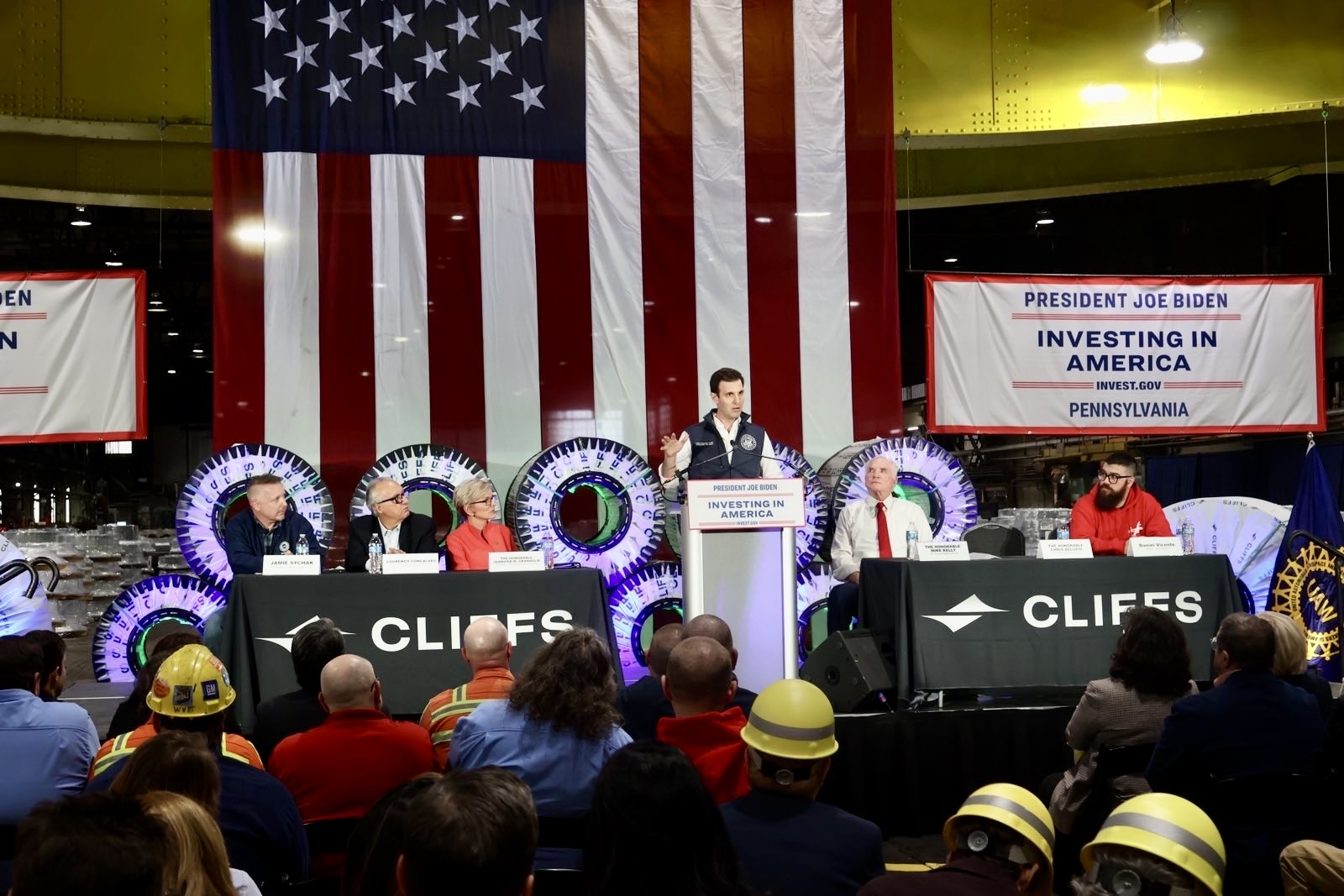
Deluzio discusses new federal rules that protect steelworker jobs while in Butler in 2024

Deluzio is the deputy whip of the Congressional Progressive Caucus (CPC).

=== Abortion rights ===
Deluzio supports legalization of abortion. He criticized the Supreme Court's decision to overturn Roe v. Wade.

=== Foreign policy ===
In 2023, Deluzio voted against banning the transfer of cluster munitions to Ukraine. That July, he co-introduced a bipartisan resolution that urged the Biden administration to secure the release of Marc Fogel, a Pennsylvania teacher from his district who was unjustly sentenced to fourteen years in a Russian prison. In August 2024, Deluzio joined a bipartisan group urging Secretary of State Antony Blinken to designate Fogel as "wrongfully detained" to emphasize the political nature of his imprisonment. In early 2025, he once again joined Pennsylvania lawmakers in calling for Fogel's release, which was secured the following month.

In October 2023, he voted in favor of providing support to Israel following the October 7 attacks. In September 2025, Deluzio signed onto a letter led by Rep. Ro Khanna which requested President Trump and Secretary of State Marco Rubio to immediately recognize the State of Palestine. In March 2026, Deluzio co-sponsored legislation blocking the sale of offensive weapons to Israel citing the 2026 Iran war and Gaza peace plan.

=== Healthcare ===
Deluzio supports universal healthcare and co-sponsored the Medicare for All Act.

=== Labor rights ===
Deluzio supports the Protecting the Right to Organize (PRO) Act, a federal bill expanding workers' rights to unionize and collectively bargain. In 2024, he co-sponsored the bipartisan Public Service Worker Protection Act to extend OSHA protections to public sector employees in all states, addressing a gap that leaves approximately eight million workers without federal workplace safety standards. He also co-sponsored that year the Stop Spying Bosses Act, which aims to protect workers' rights by regulating workplace surveillance.

== Personal life ==
Deluzio married Alexandra Zoë Bunnell in 2015, whom he met while attending law school at Georgetown. They live in Fox Chapel, Pennsylvania.

U.S. House of Representatives
| Preceded by Conor Lamb | Member of the U.S. House of Representatives from Pennsylvania's 17th congressional district 2023–present | Incumbent |
U.S. order of precedence (ceremonial)
| Preceded by Monica De La Cruz | United States representatives by seniority 304th | Succeeded by Chuck Edwards |
