= Jeremy Shaffer =

American politician

Member of the Pennsylvania House of Representatives from the 28th district
- Incumbent
- Assumed office January 7, 2025
- Preceded by: Rob Mercuri

Personal details
- Education: Tulane University; Carnegie Mellon University; University of North Carolina at Chapel Hill
- Website: Campaign website State House website

Jeremy Shaffer is an American politician. He is a Republican member of the Pennsylvania House of Representatives, representing the 28th district since 2025.

== Early life and education ==
Shaffer is a graduate of C.D. Hylton Senior High School in Dale City, Virginia. He attended Tulane University in New Orleans, Louisiana, graduating in 1999 with a Bachelor's Degree in computer engineering. He later received his Master's Degree and Ph.D. in electrical and computer engineering from Carnegie Mellon University in Pittsburgh, Pennsylvania, in 2001 and 2006, respectively.

== Career ==
After receiving his Ph.D. from Carnegie Mellon University, Shaffer went on to found InspectTech, a software company with a specialization in highway infrastructure. InspectTech would later be acquired by Bentley Systems in 2012.

Shaffer first entered electoral politics in 2013, when he defeated Walter Salachup to become Ross Township Commissioner for the eighth ward. He was re-elected unopposed in 2017. In 2018, Shaffer narrowly lost election to the Pennsylvania State Senate, losing by 793 votes to labor union organizer Lindsey Williams in the 38th Senatorial District. Shaffer did not run for a third term as Ross Township Commissioner in 2021, instead challenging Chris Deluzio in Pennsylvania's 17th congressional district in 2022, losing by 53% to 47%.

Following Rob Mercuri's decision to retire from the state legislature to also challenge Deluzio in 2024, Shaffer ran for the state house. He was unopposed in the Republican primary, and defeated prosecutor Bill Petulla in the general election.

=== Committee assignments ===
- Commerce
- Environmental and Natural Resource Protection
- Housing and Community Development
- State Government

== Electoral history ==
PA House election, 2024: Pennsylvania House, District 28
Party	Candidate	Votes	%
Republican	Jeremy Shaffer	23,228	57.01
Democratic	Bill Petulla	17,514	42.99
Total votes		40,742	100.00
Republican hold			
