= Tony Lee (actor) =

American actor

- Education: University of California, Berkeley (BA); University of California, Los Angeles (JD)
- Occupation(s): Actor · lawyer

Tony Lee is an American actor and lawyer known for his roles in The West Wing, Lost, and JAG

== Education ==
Lee attended Le Conte Junior High School in Los Angeles. He earned a Bachelor of Arts degree in psychology from the University of California, Berkeley and a Juris Doctor from the UCLA School of Law.

== Career ==
After graduating from law school, Lee was admitted to the State Bar of California. He began his career as a contract employee at Greenberg Glusker. From 2008 to 2020, he was a corporate attorney at Advisors LLP. In 2020, Lee co-founded Novos Law LLP.

Lee has appeared various television series since 2000, including The West Wing episode "Han". Lee had a reoccurring stint on Lost, where he played Jae Lee for several episodes. He is also well known for playing his role as Tony Lee in the Nickelodeon television sitcom Just Jordan.

== Filmography ==
=== Film ===
Year	Title	Role	Notes
2004	One Last Ride	Richie	
2004	The Seat Filler	Waiter	
2005	Shackles	Korean Cop	
2006	Sweet and Sour	Professor Lew	
2006	Novel Romance	Todd	

=== Television ===
Year	Title	Role	Notes
2000	City of Angels	Lee	Episode: "Assume the Position"
2001	Arrest & Trial	Tran	Episode: "Cop Killer"
2002	24	Deng	Episode: "Day 2: 8:00 a.m.-9:00 a.m."
2002, 2003	Girlfriends	Server / Waiter	2 episodes
2003	Dragnet	Detective Lee	2 episodes
2003	The West Wing	Jai Yung Ahn	Episode: "Han"
2003	The Tracy Morgan Show	Maitre D'	Episode: "The Anniversary"
2003, 2004	JAG	Lt. Charles Yi	2 episodes
2004	ER	Qwon Fah	Episode: "Touch & Go"
2005	Monk	Delivery Man	Episode: "Mr. Monk Gets Cabin Fever"
2005–2006	Lost	Jae-Hyeok Lee	3 episodes
2006	Without a Trace	Oishi	Episode: "Odds or Evens"
2006	Charmed	Dog	Episode: "12 Angry Zen"
2006	E-Ring	Captain Kim	Episode: "Friends and Enemies"
2006	Standoff	Dr. Berg	Episode: "Life Support"
2009	Anatomy of Hope	Dr. Chen	Television film
2009	Lost: Destiny Calls	Jae-Hyeok Lee	Television film
