= Rob Mercuri =

American politician (born 1982)

Member of the Pennsylvania House of Representatives from the 28th district
- In office January 5, 2021 – November 30, 2024
- Preceded by: Mike Turzai
- Succeeded by: Jeremy Shaffer

Personal details
- Born: Robert W. Mercuri; 1981 (age 44–45) Franklin, Pennsylvania, U.S.
- Party: Republican
- Education: United States Military Academy (BS); University of Massachusetts, Amherst (MBA)

Military service
- Branch/service: United States Army

Robert W. Mercuri (born 1981) is an American politician. He served as a member of the Pennsylvania House of Representatives, representing District 28. He was the Republican nominee in the 2024 election for U.S. Representative from Pennsylvania's 17th congressional district.

== Early life and career ==
Mercuri was raised in West Deer Township and attended Deer Lakes High School, graduating in 2000. He subsequently graduated from the United States Military Academy in 2004. His West Point class of 2004 classmates include U.S. representatives John James, Pat Ryan, and Wesley Hunt. Following West Point he was deployed to Iraq. Upon completing his military service, Mercuri enrolled in night classes offered by the University of Massachusetts Amherst and worked for two accounting firms in New York City. He returned to Pennsylvania when hired by PNC Financial Services. With his wife, Kelsey, Mercuri owns a UPS Store location located in Wexford.

== Political career ==
After incumbent representative Mike Turzai of House District 28 announced that he would not run for reelection in 2020, Mercuri won a Republican Party primary against Michael Heckmann and Libby Blackburn, with Turzai's endorsement. Mercuri defeated Emily Skopov in the 2020 general election. He won reelection in 2022, defeating Democratic nominee Alison Duncan.

=== Committee assignments ===
- Commerce, Secretary
- Education
- Finance
- Urban Affairs

=== 2024 U.S. House campaign ===
On August 15, 2023, Mercuri declared his candidacy for the Republican nomination for Pennsylvania's 17th congressional district, currently held by Democrat Chris Deluzio. He was defeated by Chris Deluzio in the general election 54% to 46%.
