= Elaine Farmer =

American politician

Elaine F. Farmer

Member of the Pennsylvania House of Representatives from the 28th district
- In office January 6, 1987 – November 30, 1996
- Preceded by: George Pott
- Succeeded by: Jane Orie

Personal details
- Born: March 14, 1937
- Died: August 6, 2001 (aged 64) Pittsburgh, Pennsylvania, United States
- Party: Republican

Elaine Frazier Farmer (March 14, 1937 – August 6, 2001) was a Republican member of the Pennsylvania House of Representatives. She died of multiple myeloma in 2001.

== Background ==
Born on March 14, 1937, Elaine Farmer earned her Bachelor of Arts degree in business administration from Case Western Reserve University in 1958 and her Master of Arts in education from that same institution in 1964. She then went on to become a teacher and businesswoman. A member of the council for McCandless from 1980 to 1986, she also served on the board of directors for the Northland Public Library from 1981 to 1985.

A Republican, she was elected to the Pennsylvania House of Representatives in 1986, and served five consecutive terms.

== Illness, death and interment ==
Diagnosed with multiple myeloma, Farmer died on August 6, 2001, and was buried at the Allegheny County Memorial Park in Allison Park.
