= Jane Orie =

American politician

Jane Clare Orie
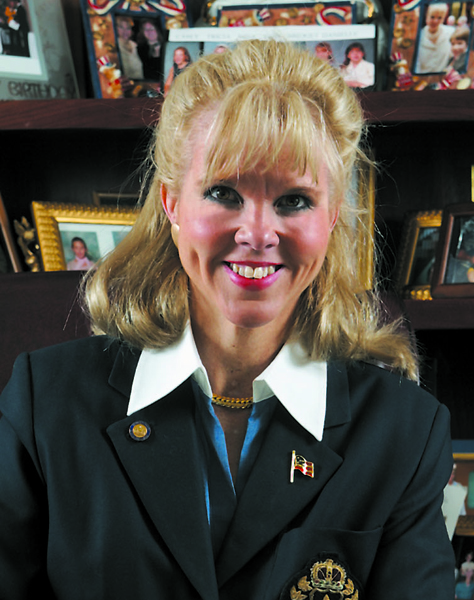
- Jane Clare Orie

Member of the Pennsylvania Senate from the 40th district
- In office April 3, 2001 – May 21, 2012
- Preceded by: Melissa Hart
- Succeeded by: Randy Vulakovich

Member of the Pennsylvania House of Representatives from the 28th district
- In office January 7, 1997 – April 3, 2001
- Preceded by: Elaine Farmer
- Succeeded by: Mike Turzai

Personal details
- Born: September 18, 1961 (age 65) Pittsburgh, Pennsylvania, U.S.
- Party: Republican
- Education: Franklin & Marshall College (BA); Duquesne University (JD)
- Occupation: Attorney

Jane Clare Orie (born September 18, 1961) is an American politician and attorney who served in both Houses of the Pennsylvania General Assembly. While in the State Senate, she represented the 40th district, including portions of Allegheny County and Butler County, and served as the Majority Whip. Orie is also a former member of the State House, where she represented the 28th district. She resigned from the State Senate in May 2012, following her conviction on 14 counts of forgery, conflict of interest and theft of services, and served the minimum two-and-a half years of a two-and-a-half to ten-year prison sentence. She was disbarred by the Pennsylvania Supreme Court on December 10, 2014.

== Early life and education ==
Orie was born in Pittsburgh, Pennsylvania to a western Pennsylvania political family. Her sister Joan Orie Melvin was a judge on the Superior Court of Pennsylvania and is now suspended from her position as a Justice of the Supreme Court of Pennsylvania. Orie earned her B.A. from Franklin & Marshall College in 1984 and her J.D. from the Duquesne University School of Law in 1987. Orie served as an assistant district attorney in Allegheny County and later as a deputy state attorney general.

== Career ==
In 1996, Orie ran for the Pennsylvania House of Representatives for the 28th House District after incumbent representative Elaine Farmer dropped off the ballot to fight bone marrow cancer. Orie won that November and won re-election in 1998 and 2000.

In 2000, State Senator Melissa Hart was elected to the United States House of Representatives and resigned her Senate seat. In a special election Orie was the GOP nominee against Democrat James Rooney, a grandson of late Pittsburgh Steelers owner, Art Rooney. A key issue in that race was public funding for the new Steelers stadium, Heinz Field, which was unpopular in parts of the county. Orie tried to tie Rooney to this unpopular issue, even running a television advertisement depicting the implosion of Three Rivers Stadium. Orie defeated Rooney with 59% in the election on March 11, 2001, and was seated on April 3, 2001. Orie won re-election in 2002 and 2006, both times taking more than 70% against minimal opposition.

In May 2006, Bob Jubelirer and Chip Brightbill, the Republicans' two top leaders were defeated in the primary election, victims of the legislative pay raise fallout. Jeff Piccola left his post as whip to run for President Pro Tempore. This opened the door for Orie, who defeated John Gordner for the position.

=== Allegations of impropriety ===
Authorities seized thousands of computer records from one of Orie's district offices in mid-December 2009, as part of an investigation conducted by Allegheny County District Attorney Stephen Zappala. Zappala would not disclose to the public a reason for investigating Orie.

A story in the Pittsburgh Post-Gazette alleged that the core of the investigation involves the employment of one of her district offices for campaign purposes.

The Post-Gazette subsequently reported that a University of Pittsburgh student intern had told prosecutors of widespread political campaigning inside the office on behalf of Orie's sister, State Supreme Court Justice Joan Orie Melvin. The story also revealed that Orie's chief of staff had begun cooperating with investigators. Justice Melvin was indicted and convicted on charges of misusing publicly funded staff for political work on her two Supreme Court races.

=== Criminal prosecution and conviction ===
In April 2010, an Allegheny County grand jury indicted Jane Orie and her sister Janine Orie on multiple charges of corruption. Pending a preliminary hearing scheduled for May 19, both defendants were released on their own recognizance, but they were prohibited from having non-business contacts with any of the witnesses in the case. Under Senate rules, a member who is charged with an offense related to his or her official duties must vacate any leadership position. Accordingly, following her indictment, Orie resigned as majority whip.

A trial date of February 7, 2011 was set for the criminal trial of Orie and her sister Janine. However, while jury deliberations were underway, Judge Jeffrey Manning declared a mistrial for both the Senator and her sister upon learning that evidence submitted by the defense had been doctored. The signature of former Orie aide Jamie Pavlot, a key prosecution witness, appeared to have been cut-and-pasted from one document to another. Manning suspended the jury deliberations, declaring that the copying was so blatant that "Ray Charles could see that signature was doctored." Hours later, he declared a mistrial and dismissed the jury, saying that "a fraud had been perpetrated" on the court. A new trial date was set for April 11, although Orie's lawyer announced his intent to appeal the decision on the grounds that a new trial would constitute a violation of Orie's right to avoid double jeopardy.

In March 2012, Orie was convicted of 14 counts of forgery, conflict of interest and theft of services, which included five felonies. Like most states, Pennsylvania has a provision in its constitution barring convicted felons from holding office. Accordingly, Orie resigned from the State Senate on May 21, 2012.

A special election occurred on August 7, 2012, to replace her; the Republican nominee in the race was State Representative Randy Vulakovich, while Democratic nominee was Sharon Brown, a health care consultant. Vulakovich defeated Brown by a wide margin.

On June 5, 2012, Orie was sentenced to two-and-a-half to ten years in prison. In sentencing her, Manning said that Orie had engaged in crimes that "demean the sanctity of all we do as lawyers." He was particularly angered by Orie's submission of fraudulent documents, calling it a "flagrant and disgraceful violation" of her oath as an attorney. Manning was so disgusted with Orie's behavior that he revoked her bail and remanded her to custody immediately rather than allow her to self-report. She was incarcerated at the Cambridge Springs State Correctional Institution in Crawford County, where she was Inmate Number OS9360.

On February 9, 2014, Orie was released from prison, after serving the minimum sentence of two-and-a-half years.

Pennsylvania State Senate
Preceded by Melissa Hart	Member of the Pennsylvania Senate for the 40th District; 2001–2012	Succeeded by Randy Vulakovich
Pennsylvania House of Representatives
Preceded by Elaine Farmer	Member of the Pennsylvania House of Representatives for the 28th District; 1997–2001	Succeeded by Mike Turzai
Party political offices
Preceded by Jeff Piccola	Republican Whip of the Pennsylvania Senate; 2007–2010	Succeeded by Pat Browne
