= James B. Kelly III =

American politician

Deputy Assistant Secretary of Commerce. Economic Policy, Africa the Near East And South Asia, International Trade Administration, U.S. Department of Commerce
- In office November 1984 – June 1988
- President: Ronald Reagan

James B. Kelly III

Member of the Pennsylvania House of Representatives from the 28th district
- In office January 5, 1971 – November 30, 1976
- Preceded by: William Appleton
- Succeeded by: George Pott

Personal details
- Born: May 28, 1941 (age 85) Pittsburgh, Pennsylvania
- Party: Republican
- Education: Virginia Tech
- Occupation: Executive in Residence at the University of Pittsburgh Katz Graduate School of Business

James Bennett Kelly III (born May 28, 1941) is the Executive in Residence at the University of Pittsburgh Katz Graduate School of Business.

== Biography ==
Kelly is a graduate of Virginia Tech, where he served for ten years on the Pamplin Business School's advisory board, and ASU's Thunderbird School of Global Management.

For three years, Kelly was president and CEO of Flight Explorer, a software and information technology solutions provider to the global aviation community. A former pilot, Kelly took the company from a significant loss to profitability, doubling revenue and implementing an exit strategy that resulted in the company's acquisition by Sabre Holdings.

As the founder of SynXis, a hotel reservation management software provider to more than 50,000 hotels, Kelly served for eight years as president and CEO. Sabre acquired SynXis in 2005.

A former vice president, international, of BDM, an 8,000-person Carlyle technical services firm that is now part of Northrop Grumman, Kelly previously served as international programs vice president at SAIC and before that was deputy assistant secretary of economic policy for Africa, the Near East and South Asia under U.S. Secretary Malcolm Baldrige during the second administration of President Ronald Reagan.

Prior to joining that administration, he held various international engineering marketing positions, worked for several years on Capitol Hill and served six years in the Pennsylvania Legislature.

An experienced international executive, Kelly has directed the global growth of a variety of American firms in more than fifteen countries. He also led Dutch manufacturing consulting and German aerospace and defense acquisitions, adding $200 million in revenue to BDM's global reach. BDM was taken public by Carlyle and later acquired by Northrop Grumman.

Kelly established the European headquarters of a diversified American manufacturing firm while acquiring a Dutch subsidiary and consolidating Austrian, French, and Spanish affiliates. As SAIC's international vice president, he established a French medical systems affiliate with the former minister of health.

As a deputy assistant secretary of commerce in the Reagan Administration, Kelly was responsible for economic relations with 72 countries in Africa, the Near East, and South Asia. He handled a number of sensitive negotiations with countries, including Iraq, South Africa, Saudi Arabia, Algeria, India, and Pakistan.

A former member of the Pennsylvania House of Representatives and assistant to U.S. Senators Richard S. Schweiker (R-PA) and Hugh Scott (R-PA), Kelly subsequently led the efforts of Dravo, a Pittsburgh engineering and river equipment manufacturing company, to improve transportation and communications the length of the Yangtze River spending the better part of two years in emerging China.

== Personal life ==
Kelly lived in Europe, the Middle East, North Africa and Asia a total of ten years and speaks French and Italian.
