= John Regoli =

American politician

John W. Regoli

Member of the Pennsylvania Senate from the 40th district
- In office January 3, 1987 – November 30, 1990
- Preceded by: Edward Early
- Succeeded by: Melissa Hart
- Constituency: Parts of Allegheny, Armstrong, and Westmoreland Counties

Personal details
- Born: June 4, 1938 (age 88)
- Party: Democratic

John W. Regoli (born June 4, 1938) is a former Democratic member of the Pennsylvania State Senate, serving from 1987 to 1990.

Following his electoral defeat in 1990, Regoli was appointed by Pennsylvania Governor Robert P. Casey to be his special assistant for southwestern Pennsylvania affairs.
