= Career Education Colleges and Universities =

US trade association

- Formation: 1991
- Type: Trade association
- Purpose: Representing for-profit colleges
- Headquarters: Washington, DC
- Members: 800+ for-profit colleges
- President: Jason Altmire
- Website: www.career.org

Career Education Colleges and Universities (CECU) is a Washington, D.C.-based trade association that represents for-profit colleges.

== History ==
CECU as it is organized today was created in 1991 following a merger of the Association for Independent Colleges and Schools (AICS) and the National Association of Trade and Technical Schools (NATTS). The combined association was called the Career College Association (CCA). In 2010, the association changed its name to the Association of Private Sector Colleges and Universities (APSCU), but today is known as CECU.

During the administration of President Barack Obama, a series of federal investigations and lawsuits were initiated against for-profit education companies. APSCU waged an extensive lobbying campaign and filed a 2012 lawsuit against the United States Department of Education seeking to halt the department's regulations targeting for-profit colleges. Judge Rudolph Contreras struck down the regulations, which he called "arbitrary and capricious". In 2014, the association filed a second lawsuit challenging similar regulations (79 FR 64890), but this time the regulations were implemented.

By 2015, some of APSCU's largest members were under federal and state investigation and several subsequently left the association. Some of the largest companies in the sector collapsed under the weight of the regulations, charges of impropriety, and related legal actions. In 2016, APSCU changed its name to Career Education Colleges and Universities (CECU), a move association leaders said better reflected the evolving membership of the organization.

President Donald Trump and his Education Secretary Betsy DeVos dismantled many of Obama's actions targeting for-profit colleges.

=== Recent activities ===
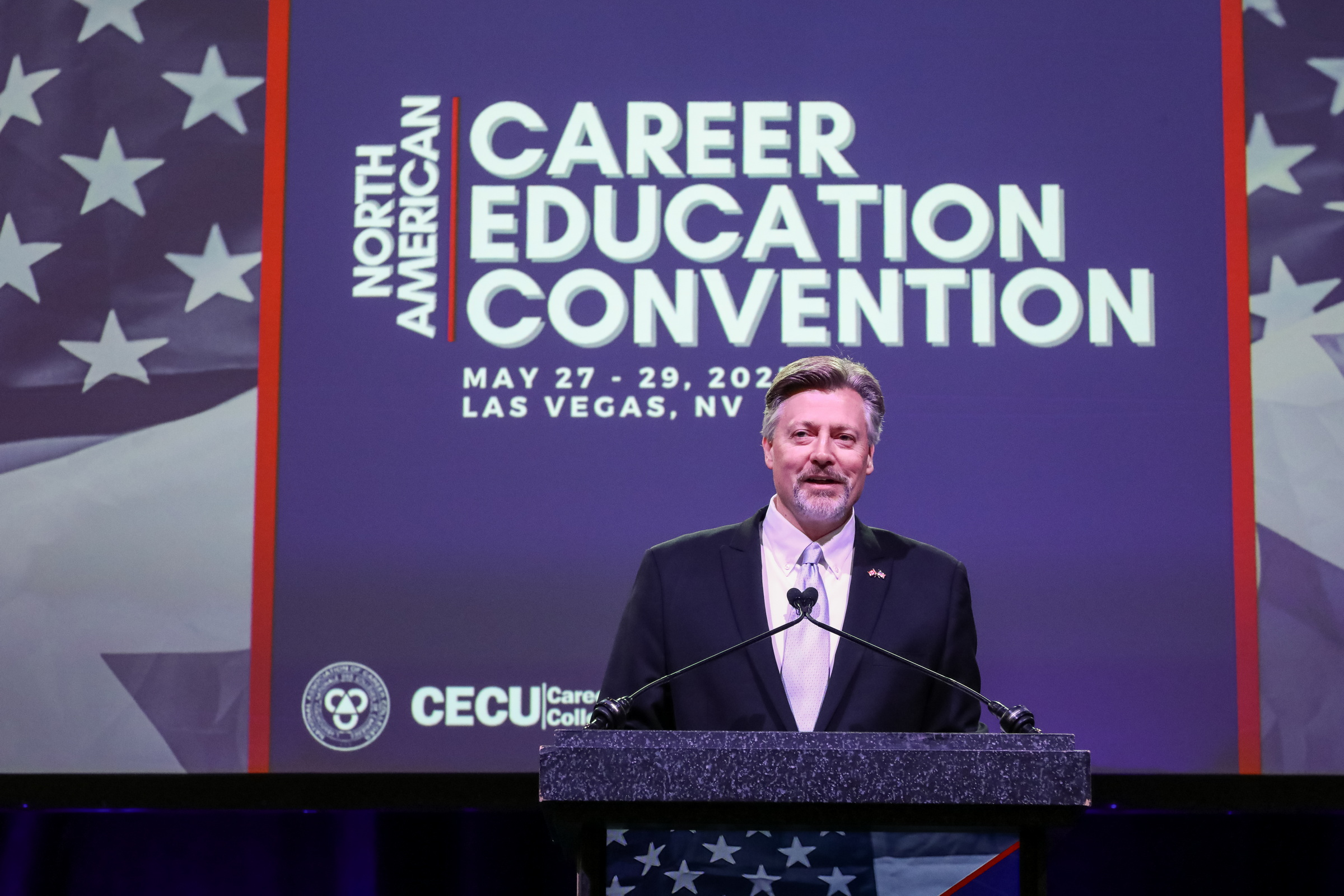
Jason Altmire speaks at CECU’s 2025 convention

After Joe Biden won the 2020 presidential election, CECU named former Democratic congressman Jason Altmire as its president.

The group has grown in influence in recent years, playing an active role in opposing Biden-era regulations targeting for-profit colleges, supporting lawsuits against those regulations, and advocating for policies that would favor for-profit institutions.

In 2025, President Trump nominated a former senior official at CECU, Nicholas Kent, to lead the administration’s work on higher education as Under Secretary of Education.
