= William M. Appleton =

American politician

Member of the Pennsylvania House of Representatives from the 28th district
- In office January 7, 1969 – November 30, 1970
- Preceded by: District Created
- Succeeded by: James Kelly

Member of the Pennsylvania House of Representatives from the Allegheny County district
- In office January 5, 1965 – November 30, 1968

Personal details
- Born: August 23, 1920
- Died: October 6, 2001 (aged 81)
- Party: Republican

William M. Appleton (August 23, 1920 – October 6, 2001) was a Republican member of the Pennsylvania House of Representatives.
