= Pennsylvania House of Representatives, District 28 =

American legislative district

Pennsylvania's 28th State House of Representatives district
Representative
Jeremy Shaffer; R–Pine Township, Allegheny County
- Population (2022): 63,153

The 28th Pennsylvania House of Representatives District is in southwestern Pennsylvania and has been represented by Jeremy Shaffer since 2025.

== District profile ==
The 28th Pennsylvania House of Representatives District is located in Allegheny County and includes the following areas:

- Bradford Woods
- Hampton Township (part)
  - District 01
  - District 02
  - District 06
  - District 07
  - District 08
  - District 09
  - District 10
  - District 11
- Marshall Township
- Pine Township
- Richland Township
- West Deer Township

== Representatives ==
Representative	Party	Years	District home	Note
Prior to 1969, seats were apportioned by county.
William M. Appleton	Republican	1969 – 1970		
James B. Kelly III	Republican	1971 – 1976		
George F. Pott, Jr.	Republican	1977 – 1986		
Elaine F. Farmer	Republican	1987 – 1996		
Jane Orie	Republican	1997 – 2001	McCandless Township	Resigned on April 3, 2001, after election to the Pennsylvania Senate
Mike Turzai	Republican	2001 – 2020	Bradford Woods	Elected on June 26, 2001, to fill vacancy. Sworn on 12 July 2001.
Rob Mercuri	Republican	2021 – 2024		
Jeremy Shaffer	Republican	2025 – present	Pine Township, Allegheny County	

== Recent election results ==
PA House election, 2024: Pennsylvania House, District 28
Party	Candidate	Votes	%
Republican	Jeremy Shaffer	23,228	57.01
Democratic	Bill Petulla	17,514	42.99
Total votes		40,742	100.00
Republican hold			

PA House election, 2022: Pennsylvania House, District 28
Party	Candidate	Votes	%
Republican	Rob Mercuri (incumbent)	18,376	56.01
Democratic	Alison Duncan	14,432	43.99
Total votes		32,808	100.00
Republican hold			

PA House election, 2020: Pennsylvania House, District 28
Party	Candidate	Votes	%
Republican	Rob Mercuri	23,806	53.73
Democratic	Emily Skopov	20,500	46.27
Total votes		44,306	100.00
Republican hold			

PA House election, 2018: Pennsylvania House, District 28
Party	Candidate	Votes	%
Republican	Mike Turzai (incumbent)	18,322	54.45
Democratic	Emily Skopov	15,330	45.55
Total votes		33,652	100.00
Republican hold			

PA House election, 2016: Pennsylvania House, District 28
Party	Candidate	Votes	%
Republican	Mike Turzai (incumbent)	24,327	65.25
Democratic	John Craig Hammond	12,958	34.75
Total votes		37,285	100.00
Republican hold			

PA House election, 2014: Pennsylvania House, District 28
Party	Candidate	Votes	%
Republican	Mike Turzai (incumbent)	Unopposed	
Total votes		17,146	100.00
Republican hold			

PA House election, 2012: Pennsylvania House, District 28
Party	Candidate	Votes	%
Republican	Mike Turzai (incumbent)	Unopposed	
Total votes		30,236	100.00
Republican hold			

PA House election, 2010: Pennsylvania House, District 28
Party	Candidate	Votes	%
Republican	Mike Turzai (incumbent)	21,943	77.24
Democratic	Sharon Brown	6,465	22.76
Total votes		28,408	100.00
Republican hold			

== 2020 Election ==
On January 23, 2020, the incumbent office-holder, Mike Turzai, announced that he would be retiring from office at the end of his current term, to seek opportunities in the private sector. Candidates to replace him included:

Republican Party:

- Libby Blackburn (website) - School board member from McCandless Township
- Mike Heckmann (website) - part of Turzai's policy staff, from Wexford
- Rob Mercuri (website) - PNC Bank vice president and military veteran, of Pine Township

Democratic Party:

- Emily Skopov (website, party site) - nonprofit entrepreneur, of Marshall Township

=== Republican primary results ===
On June 2, 2020, Pennsylvania held its primary election. The Republican nomination was the only one contested, and its results were:

PA House Republican Primary, 2020
Party	Candidate	Votes	%	±%
Republican	Rob Mercuri	5,723	63.62%	
Republican	Elizabeth Blackburn	1,840	20.46%	
Republican	Mike Heckmann	1,432	15.92%	
Margin of victory		3,883	43.16%	
Turnout		8,995	100%	
