= Melissa Hart (politician) =

American lawyer and politician (born 1962)

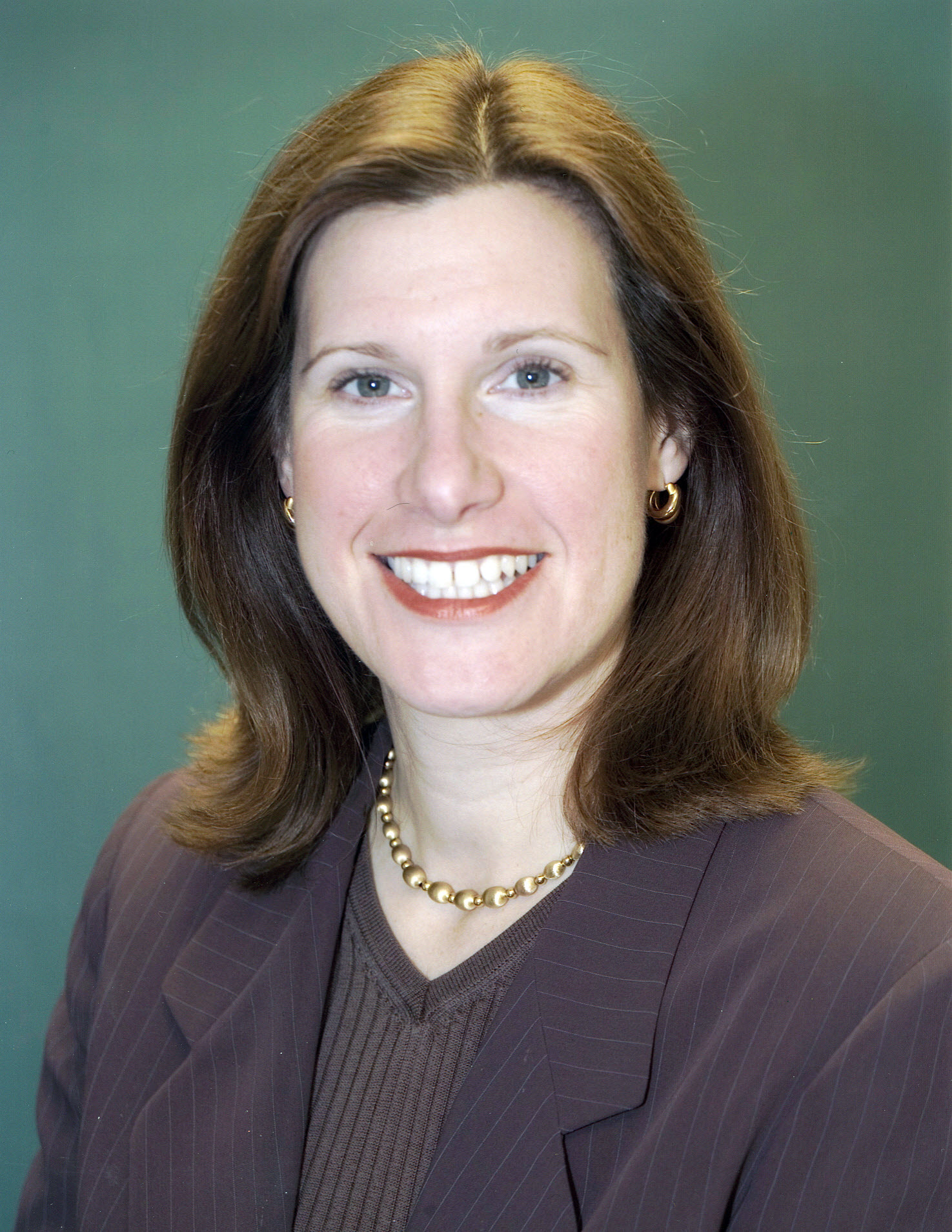

Member of the U.S. House of Representatives from Pennsylvania's 4th district
- In office January 3, 2001 – January 3, 2007
- Preceded by: Ron Klink
- Succeeded by: Jason Altmire

Member of the Pennsylvania Senate from the 40th district
- In office January 1, 1991 – January 3, 2001
- Preceded by: John Regoli
- Succeeded by: Jane Orie

Personal details
- Born: Melissa Anne Hart; April 4, 1962 (age 64) Pittsburgh, Pennsylvania, U.S.
- Party: Republican
- Education: Washington and Jefferson College (BA); University of Pittsburgh (JD)

Melissa Ann Hart (born April 4, 1962) is an American lawyer and politician. She was a Republican member of the United States House of Representatives from 2001 to 2007, representing western Pennsylvania's 4th congressional district. In the 2006 midterm elections, Hart lost her bid for re-election to Democrat Jason Altmire. She challenged Altmire again in the 2008 election, but was defeated again.

She was a candidate for Republican nomination in the 2022 Pennsylvania gubernatorial election, but dropped out on May 13, four days before the primary election and endorsed Lou Barletta.

== Early life and education ==
Hart is an Italian-American, born in Pittsburgh, Pennsylvania. She graduated from North Allegheny High School. While at Washington and Jefferson College, she earned a degree in business and German, intending to pursue a career in international business. While there, she and some friends founded the college's College Republicans club. After an internship with a local judge, she decided to attend law school.

She entered the University of Pittsburgh School of Law.

== Career ==
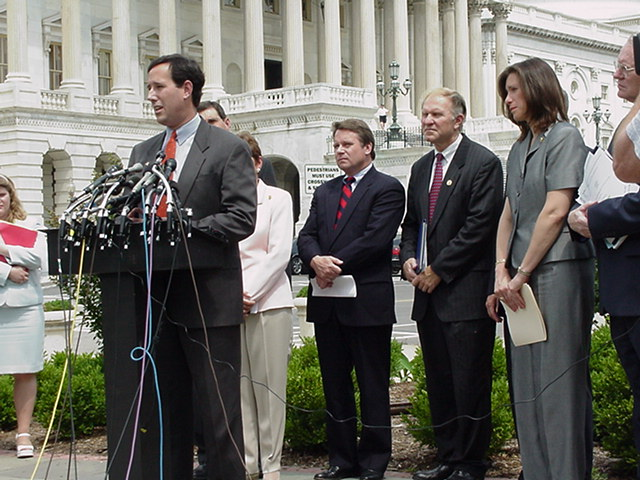
Hart and other members of Congress join Rick Santorum as they introduce the Born-Alive Infants Protection Act in June 2001

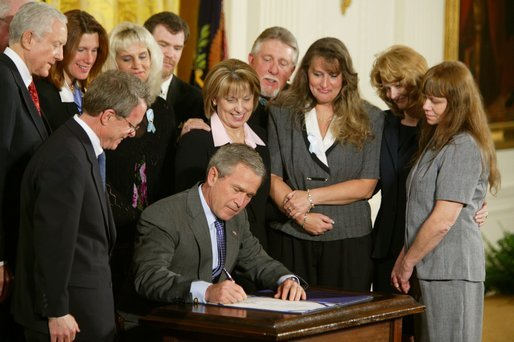
Hart watches as President George W. Bush signs the Unborn Victims of Violence Act in April 2004

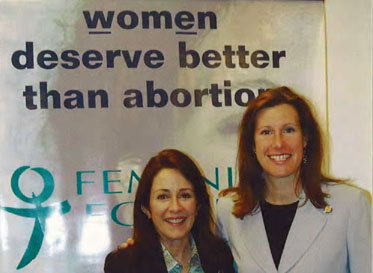
Hart (right) with actress Patricia Heaton in May 2005

After graduating from law school and being admitted to the bar, Hart joined a major Pittsburgh law firm, where she specialized in real estate law.

Hart has served on the Washington & Jefferson College Board of Trustees.

Hart was an active grassroots volunteer in her party in Western Pennsylvania from her days as a student at Washington & Jefferson College. She worked with other students to establish a College Republican Club on campus. The group was a reliable source for volunteers in Washington County where the party was in the minority in the early 1980s. It was there where Hart first learned the importance of grassroots politics, by door-knocking for candidates from District Attorney to Governor.

=== State senate ===
She was the first Republican woman to represent Pennsylvania at the federal level. (Note: Kathryn E. Granahan represented Pennsylvania in the US House of Representatives (1956–1963) as a Democrat.) Prior to her service in Congress, Hart served in the Pennsylvania Senate, where she chaired the finance committee. She was the first Republican woman elected to serve a full term in the Pennsylvania Senate in 1990 when she was 28 years old. In her first run for office, Hart defeated an incumbent in a senate district that included parts of Allegheny, Westmoreland and Armstrong counties.

=== Congress ===
In November 2000, Hart was elected to the House of Representatives from the Fourth District of the State of Pennsylvania, winning an open seat previously held by a Democrat. She had served as a senator in the Pennsylvania Senate from 1991 to 2001. She was later appointed co-chair of the Platform Committee for the 2004 Republican National Convention.

She convened a task force to rename the Pittsburgh region’s highway system of I-279S/US-22/30W/PA-60N to extend and become a part of federal highway I-376. This initiative was researched and supported by local governments and the commonwealth as a tool to attract outside development to the region. This was supported by site selection professional who participated as well as the Southwest PA Regional Planning Commission.

Hart co-chaired the Republican Party platform of 2004. In 2005 she was appointed to the House Ways and Means Committee.

Hart played an active role in the race for majority leader in early 2006. As a top whip for the successful candidacy of Rep. John Boehner (R-OH), she worked to secure votes for him in the race. She was one of a handful of GOP members who called for a full set of new leadership elections for whip, conference chair, and other offices below the majority leader position, but that motion narrowly failed the day before the majority leader race. Had this motion passed, Hart may have challenged Rep. Deborah Pryce (R-OH) for House Republican Conference Chairman, the No. 4 leadership spot.

In December 2002, Hart was a candidate for Conference Vice-Chair, the No. 5 leadership spot, but lost to Jack Kingston (R-GA). In a 2002 PoliticsPA feature story designating politicians with yearbook superlatives, Hart was named amongst those "Most Likely to Succeed."

Hart is Roman Catholic and was a legislative leader on anti-abortion issues, such as opposition to federal funding for embryonic stem cell research. In January 2006, she addressed an anti-abortion rally in Washington, D.C., urging young people who oppose abortion to enter public service. She opposed abortions for rape and incest cases, and sponsored laws to promote assistance to women and children such as safe haven laws which prevent mothers from being charged with abandonment when they bring their child to a safe place such as a hospital or police station to allow the child to be adopted.

=== 2006 election ===
As the 2006 campaign season approached, Hart's congressional seat was not considered vulnerable, and Hart was described in media accounts as a "rising star" in Republican politics, who had never lost an election and who had demonstrated a unique ability to appeal to non-conservative voters even while maintaining a generally conservative voting record. In late 2005, her predecessor in the House of Representatives, Democrat Ron Klink, publicly mulled over the possibility of challenging Hart for his old seat. However, in late December, Klink announced that he would not run. Jason Altmire, a 38-year-old health care executive and political unknown (and, by coincidence, a neighbor of Hart's brother), ultimately won the Democratic nomination for the seat.

For most of 2006, the Altmire campaign was viewed as a long shot, but as the campaign wound down his poll numbers surged and Hart's dropped. An October, a Susquehanna poll showed Hart with what was then a surprisingly narrow 46%–42% lead over Altmire. Altmire's continued to climb as Hart's stalled, and five days before the November 7, 2006, election, the Cook Political Report altered its rating of the race from "Likely Republican" to "Toss up."

On Election Day, Hart was defeated by a margin of 52%–48%.

Hart's loss was one component of a broad Republican meltdown in Pennsylvania. Senator Rick Santorum, who was at the top of the Republican ticket, lost his re-election bid by a very large margin. Pennsylvania also saw the defeat of three other incumbent Republican members of Congress. Democratic victories for the governor, and Democratic gains in the state House of Representatives also occurred that year.

Following the election, she returned to the law firm Keevican Weiss Bauerle & Hirsch, where she had worked before being elected to Congress. She returned to her specialization of "general practice and business development."

=== 2008 election ===
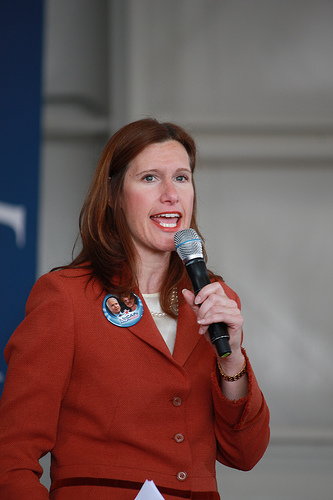
Hart speaking at a rally for John McCain at the Greater Pittsburgh International Airport in November 2008

Hart announced in July 2007 that she would run against Altmire in 2008. Despite speculation that retired athlete and former gubernatorial candidate Lynn Swann would run for the seat, Hart was unopposed for the Republican nomination. In the general election, she was again defeated by Altmire, this time by a much larger margin.

=== Later career ===
Following Hart’s departure from the House in 2007, she rejoined her law firm, Keevican Weiss Bauerle & Hirsch (now Keevican Weiss & Bauerle), where she worked to build and chair the government relations section. She later returned to her original law firm, Hergenroeder Rega Ewing & Kennedy in 2017 to work with a group of attorneys with whom she had begun her legal career. In 2018, Hart was elected to the Board of Directors of Enterprise Bank. Also in 2018, Hart co-founded, with Tim Watkins and her former House colleague, Thaddeus McCotter, a political strategy, creative, and media firm, RPC Strategies, LLC.

Hart sought to retake her state senate seat in a 2012 special election triggered when her successor, Jane Orie, was forced to resign after being convicted of corruption and forgery. However, she lost the Republican primary to state Representative Randy Vulakovich.

In December 2021, Hart announced her intent to run for governor of Pennsylvania in the 2022 Republican primary. She dropped out on May 13, 2022, and endorsed former Congressman Lou Barletta. Her name remained on the ballot and she garnered 54,000 votes.

== See also ==
- Women in the United States House of Representatives

== Notes ==
U.S. House of Representatives
Preceded by Ronald Klink	Member of the U.S. House of Representatives from Pennsylvania's 4th congressional district 2001–2007	Succeeded by Jason Altmire
U.S. order of precedence (ceremonial)
Preceded by Joe Hoeffel as Former U.S. Representative	Order of precedence of the United States as Former U.S. Representative	Succeeded by Jason Altmire as Former U.S. Representative
