= Joe Sestak =

American politician and Navy officer (born 1951)

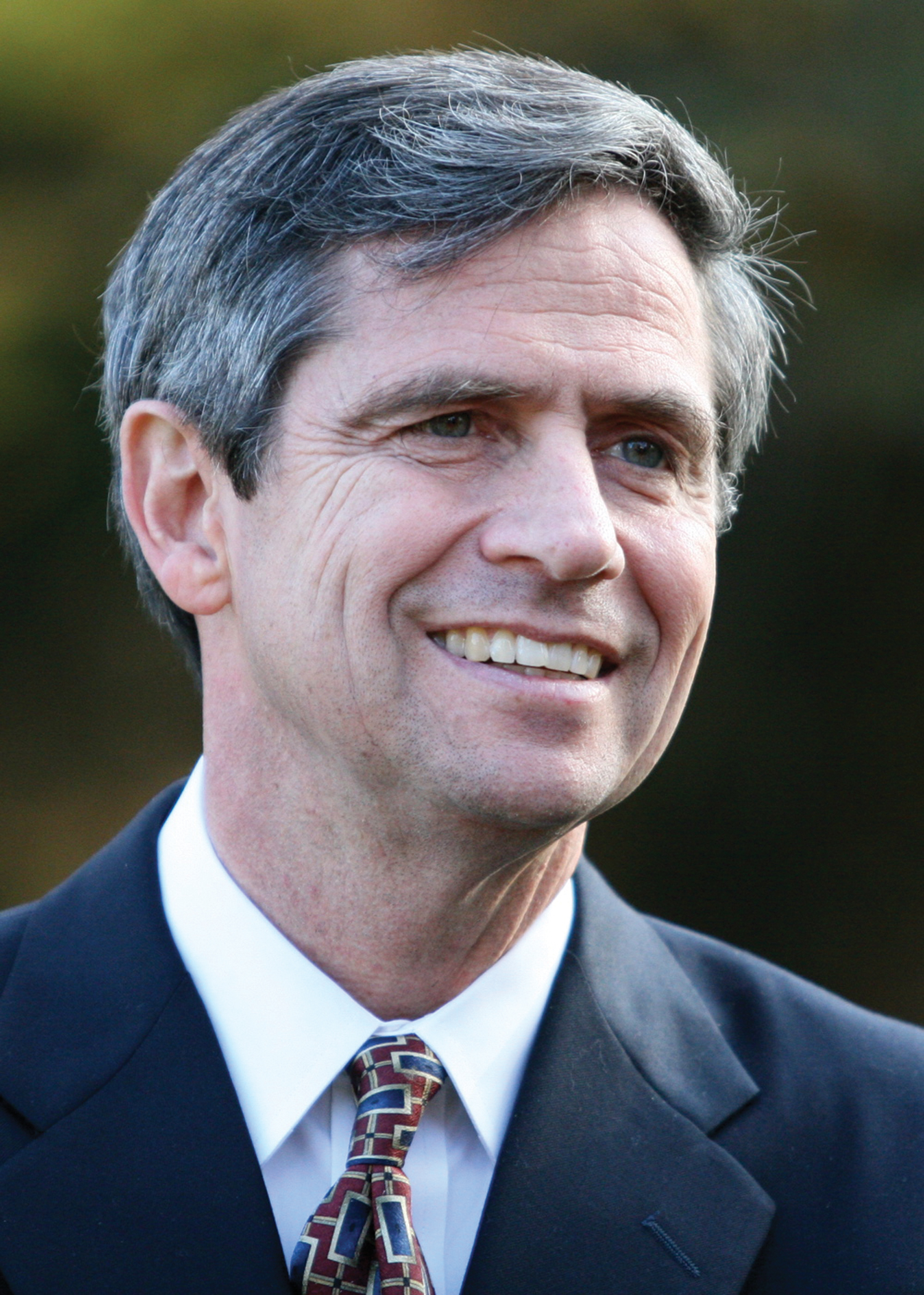
- Official portrait, 2009

Member of the U.S. House of Representatives from Pennsylvania's 7th district
- In office January 3, 2007 – January 3, 2011
- Preceded by: Curt Weldon
- Succeeded by: Pat Meehan

Personal details
- Born: Joseph Ambrose Sestak Jr. December 12, 1951 (age 74) Secane, Pennsylvania, U.S.
- Party: Independent (before 2006); Democratic (2006–2022); Forward (2022–present)
- Spouse: Susan Clark (m. 1998)
- Children: 1
- Education: United States Naval Academy (BS); Harvard University (MPA, PhD)

Military service
- Branch/service: United States Navy
- Years of service: 1974–2005
- Rank: Vice Admiral
- Commands: Director of Navy Operations Group
- Awards: Defense Distinguished Service Medal (3); Navy Distinguished Service Medal (2); Legion of Merit (2); Meritorious Service Medal (2); Joint Service Commendation Medal

Joseph Ambrose Sestak Jr. (born December 12, 1951) is an American politician and retired U.S. Navy officer. He represented Pennsylvania's 7th congressional district in the U.S. House of Representatives from 2007 to 2011 and was the Democratic nominee for the United States Senate in 2010. A three-star admiral, he was the highest-ranking military official ever elected to the United States Congress at the time of his election. He was a candidate for the Democratic presidential nomination in the 2020 election, launching his campaign on June 23, 2019, and ending it on December 1, 2019, subsequently endorsing Amy Klobuchar.

Graduating second in his class at the United States Naval Academy, Sestak served in the United States Navy for over 31 years and rose to the rank of three-star admiral. He served as the Director for Defense Policy on the National Security Council staff under President Bill Clinton and held a series of operational commands, including commanding the USS George Washington carrier strike group during combat operations in the Persian Gulf and Indian Ocean in 2002.

Sestak was elected to the House of Representatives in 2006, and reelected in 2008 by a 20% margin. He declined to run for reelection in 2010, instead running for the Senate. In the Democratic primary he defeated incumbent Senator Arlen Specter, in office since 1981, 54% to 46%, but lost the general election to Republican nominee Pat Toomey in a close race. Sestak sought a rematch with Toomey in the 2016 election, but lost the primary to Katie McGinty by just under ten points, in the closest and costliest Senate primary of the 2016 cycle, while facing opposition from prominent Democrats.

Sestak announced a campaign for the Democratic Party's presidential nomination in on June 23, 2019. His campaign attracted little support and he failed to qualify for any debates. He dropped out of the race on December 1, 2019.

Sestak has also served as president of FIRST Global, a nonprofit with the objective of promoting STEM education that brought high-school age teams from 157 countries to Washington, D.C., for the inaugural robotics Olympics. In 2022, he announced he was leaving the Democratic Party and joining the Forward Party.

== Early life, education and early career ==
Sestak was born in Secane, Pennsylvania, the son of Kathleen L. (Schlichte) and Joseph Ambrose Sestak. His grandfather Martin Šesták came to America from the Slovak village of Dolné Lovčice in 1922, after World War I, while his father, Joseph Sr., was sent to join Martin in America in 1924. Sestak's father graduated from the U.S. Naval Academy in 1942, and then fought in both the Atlantic and the Pacific during World War II, attaining the rank of captain. He continued his service after the war as an engineering officer at the Philadelphia Naval Shipyard.

Sestak attended Cardinal O'Hara High School in Springfield, Pennsylvania, where his mother worked as a math teacher. He was deeply inspired by his father and has recalled the time his father spent five hours fixing the family car in the freezing cold of a Philadelphia winter:

I remember going to the window and watching him. And the admiration that I had—just that strong determination of his. Never give in.

Following in his father's footsteps, Sestak was accepted into the U.S. Naval Academy immediately after graduating from high school, during the Vietnam War. In 1974 Sestak graduated second in his class of over 900 midshipmen, with a Bachelor of Science degree in American political systems. Between tours at sea he earned a Master of Public Administration and a PhD in political economy and government from the John F. Kennedy School of Government at Harvard University in 1980 and 1984, respectively.

== Naval career ==
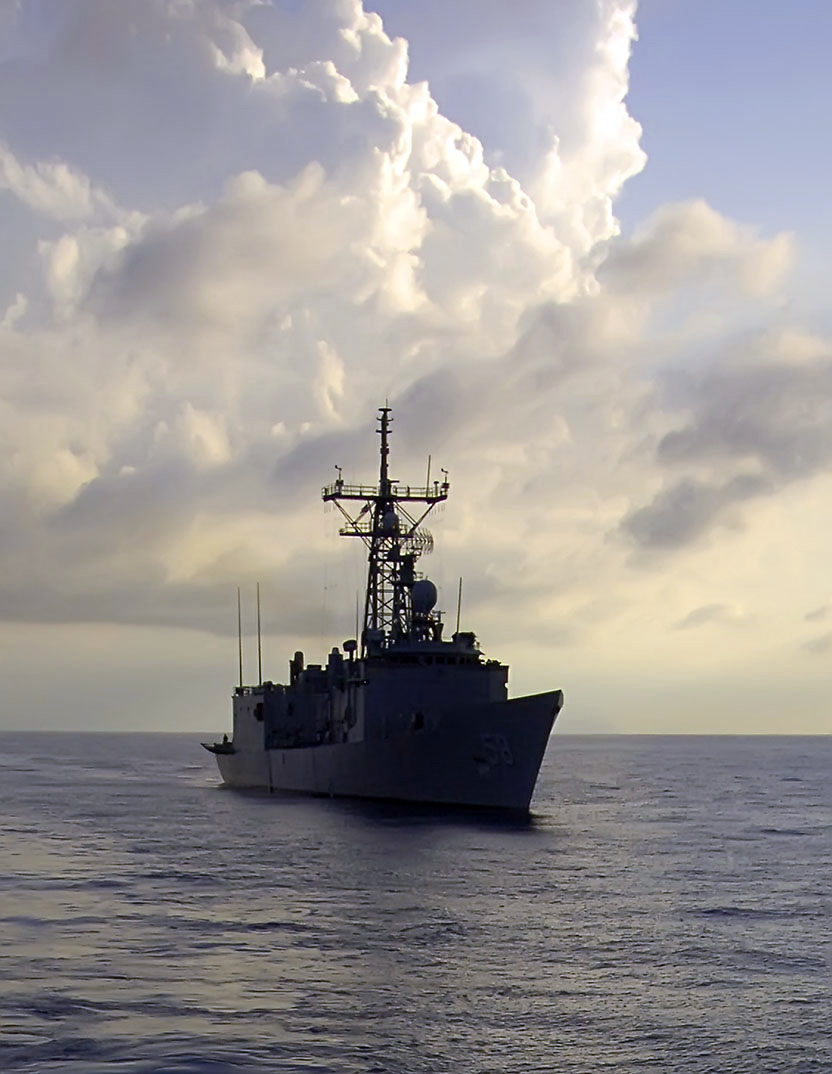
Sestak commanded the USS Samuel B. Roberts to the title of best surface vessel in the Atlantic Fleet in the 1993 competition for the Battenberg Cup.

As a surface warfare officer Sestak served division officer tours as damage control assistant, combat information center officer and weapons officer on the guided missile destroyer USS Richard E. Byrd, and later as weapons officer on the guided missile destroyer USS Hoel. He then served as aide and flag lieutenant to the admiral in charge of United States Navy surface forces in the Pacific.

In January 1986 Sestak became executive officer of the guided missile frigate USS Underwood and was instrumental in the Underwood's winning the coveted battle E and the Battenberg Cup (awarded to the best ship in the Atlantic fleet). He then served in the Politico-Military Assessment Division of the Joint Chiefs of Staff. On August 30, 1991, Sestak took command of the guided missile frigate USS Samuel B. Roberts, which was named the Atlantic Fleet's best surface combatant in the 1993 Battenberg Cup competition.

In July 1993 Sestak became the head of the Strategy and Concepts Branch in the office of the Chief of Naval Operations. From November 1994 to March 1997 he was the Director for Defense Policy on the National Security Council staff at the White House, where he was responsible for the Clinton Administration's national security strategy, policies, programs, inter-agency and congressional coordination and regional political-military advice. In May 1997 he became the commander of Destroyer Squadron 14.

Sestak then directed the CNO's Strategy and Policy Division (N51), and led the navy's efforts toward the 2000 Quadrennial Defense Review, for which he analyzed military strategic requirements and the economic value of U.S. defense spending. After the September 11 attacks he became the first director of the Navy Operations Group (Deep Blue), the navy's strategic anti-terrorism unit, which sought to redefine strategic, operational and budgetary policies in the Global War on Terrorism, reporting directly to the Chief of Naval Operations (CNO) Admiral Vern Clark. In 2002 Sestak assumed command of the George Washington Aircraft Carrier Battle Group of 10 U.S. ships and 10,000 sailors, SEALs, Marines, and 100 aircraft. He integrated it with a coalition of 20 allied ships and 5,000 sailors. It conducted combat operations in Afghanistan and Iraq.

Sestak became the director of the CNO's Analysis Group, again reporting directly to CNO Clark as policy adviser and administrator, where he directed independent analysis on strategy, warfare requirements, and resources for the CNO outside of the normal bureaucratic process of the Navy staff. Under Clark, Sestak worked to rein in military spending by maximizing fleet efficiency. In 2004 he was appointed Deputy Chief of Naval Operations for Warfare Requirements and Programs (N6/N7), where he implemented his ideas and analyses in the Navy's $350 billion Five Year Defense Plan to transform the Navy from a less effective, expensive platform-centric force structure to a more effective capabilities-based force posture with cyber and sensors. It resulted in a shipbuilding plan that departed from the traditional goal for a 375-ship level to one as low as 260.

On September 11, 2001, Sestak was on duty at the Pentagon, leaving the building moments before it was attacked.

In 2005, Sestak pushed to add a second aircraft carrier in the Pacific to support allies, deter challenges from China, and be closer to potential hot spots such as the Koreas and the Taiwan Strait, saying, "if you don’t have the speed to get to the conflict when you really need to be there, you’re interesting, but irrelevant."

=== 2005 reassignment ===
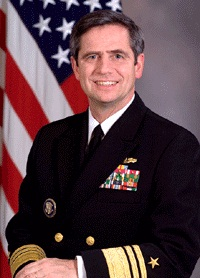
Sestak as a vice admiral and serving as Deputy Chief of Naval Operations for Warfare Requirements and Programs

In 2005, after CNO Clark retired, Sestak was administratively removed from his position as Deputy Chief of Naval Operations for Warfare Requirements and Programs (N6/N7), a three-star position. His removal was one of the first changes made by Admiral Michael Mullen when he took over as the new Chief of Naval Operations in July 2005, according to Navy Times.

Sestak was reverted to his permanent two-star rank of rear admiral, and was reassigned as a special assistant to the Vice Chief of Naval Operations. He then opted to retire when his three-year-old daughter was diagnosed with malignant brain cancer. Controversy ensued over his departure: it was reported that he was pushed out because he "ruffled feathers" within the Bush Administration and came into conflict with Secretary of Defense Donald Rumsfeld over Sestak's advocacy for spending cuts; Sestak's plan to change the Navy's force structure goals from 375 to as low as 260 by commanding the new emerging capability of cyberspace was controversial.

One hundred senior and junior officers, as well as enlisted personnel who served with Sestak, later signed a letter supporting him as "a leader of the highest caliber, a man of tremendous character, and a military officer of uncommon compassion."

In an investigative report by The Philadelphia Inquirer, Chief of Naval Operations Vern Clark said of Sestak:

He did what I asked him to do; I wanted straight talk, and this put him in the cross-hairs. People are going to say what they want to say, but [Sestak] challenged people who did not want to be challenged. The guy is courageous, a patriot's patriot.

Clark told that Associated Press that Sestak "was an incredible officer, the best I've ever seen. Incredible moral courage, the courage to take the independent stand. When everybody else was saying, 'This is what we ought to do,' he would stand up and say, 'I don't see it that way.'" Of Sestak's reassignment by Mullen, Clark told The New York Times, "I put him in that environment where he was in a position to create enemies," adding, "I should have given him better top cover."

After Sestak retired from the United States Navy, his daughter made a full recovery from cancer. He retired as a two-star admiral, not having maintained the rank of three-star admiral long enough to retain it in retirement.

=== Military decorations ===
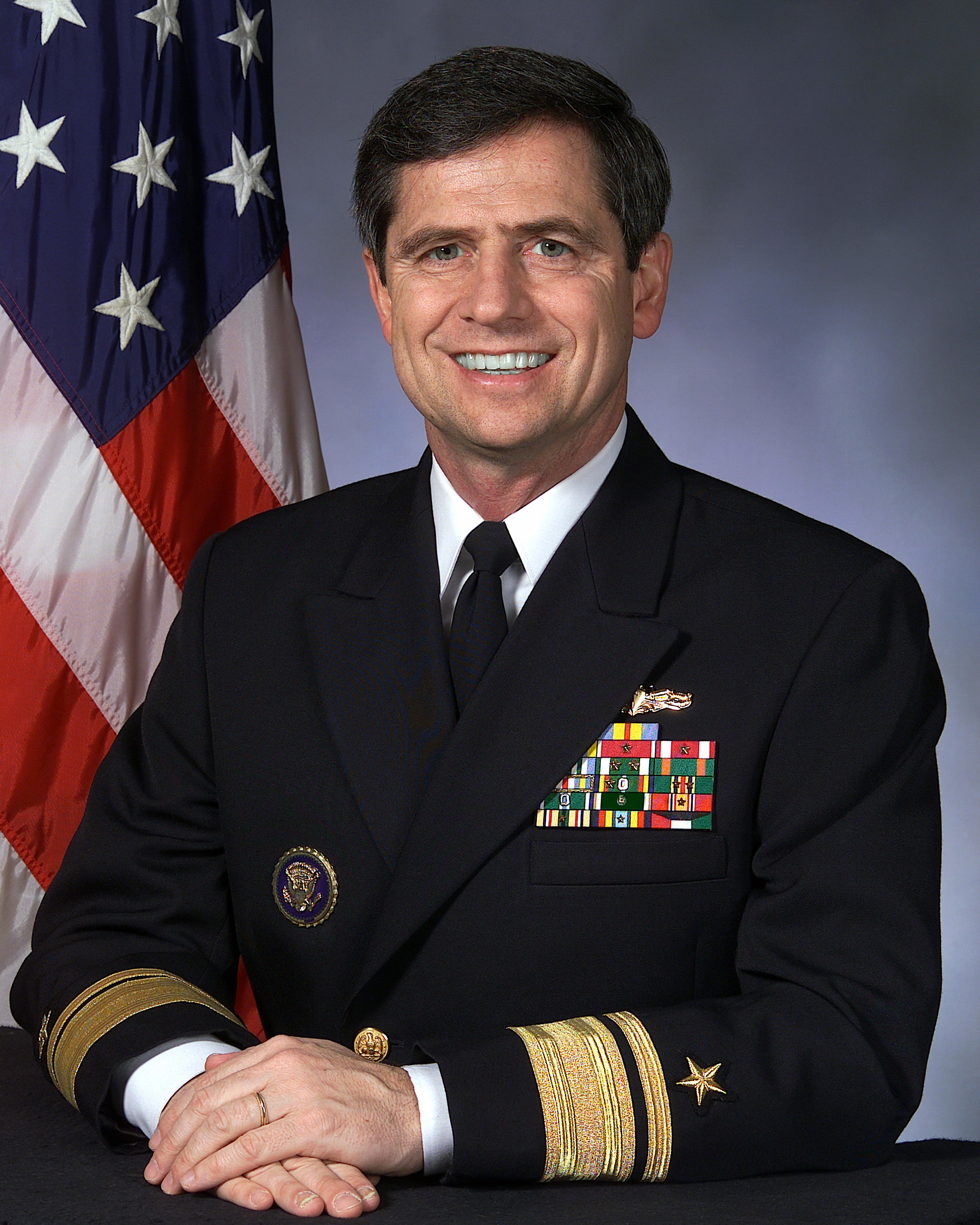
Sestak as a rear admiral

Sestak's decorations include the Defense Distinguished Service Medal, Defense Superior Service Medal, two Legion of Merit awards, two Meritorious Service Medals, Joint Service Commendation Medal, three Navy Commendation Medals and the Navy Achievement Medal.

== U.S. House of Representatives ==
=== Elections ===
2006

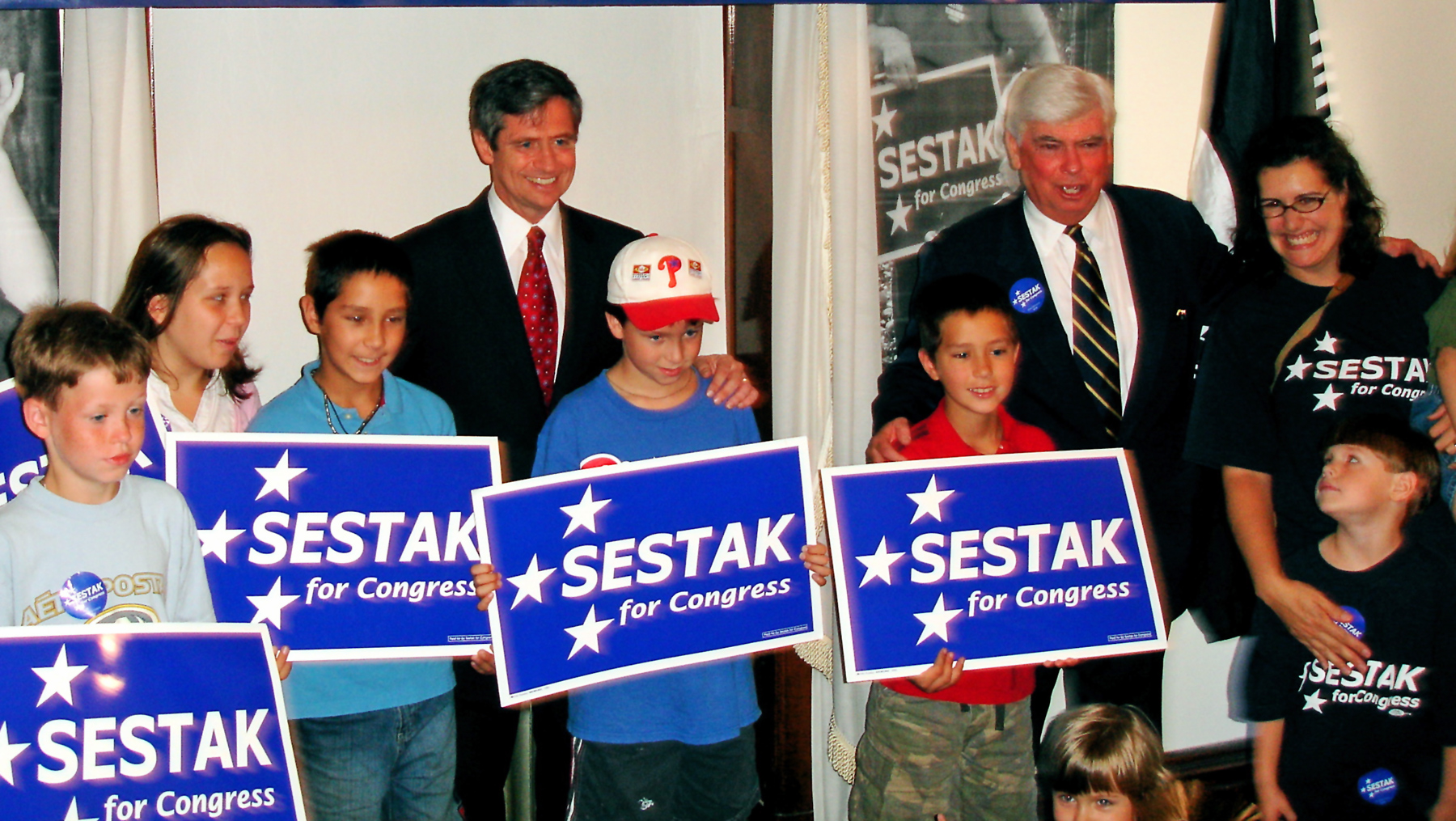
Sestak and Senator Chris Dodd at a children's issues talk in August 2006

In 2006, with his daughter's recovery going smoothly, Sestak was motivated to run for Congress by the benefits he received under the United States Military's TRICARE health care program, which gave his daughter the care she needed to treat her brain tumor. Sestak stated that, during his travels to find the best treatment for his daughter, he saw children who did not have the same quality of care, or could not afford the necessary care. Sestak made health-care reform a pillar of his campaign in hopes of giving everyone the same care his family had. He called his congressional service a continuation of his military service, "paying back" the country that took care of his daughter.

Sestak began laying the groundwork for a Congressional run in the 7th district, his home district in Pennsylvania, as a Democrat. He was then told he had to first receive the endorsement of the "DCCC". Sestak first thought this meant his hometown's Delaware County Community College, but he was eventually steered toward the correct DCCC, the Democratic Congressional Campaign Committee, and informed its head, Rahm Emanuel, of his candidacy. Emanuel told Sestak he was not ready for to run in a district where registered Republicans outnumbered Democrats 2:1. Sestak decided to run anyway and turned to his brother, Richard, and sisters, Elizabeth and Margaret, who served as his campaign manager, top fundraiser and treasurer, respectively. Sestak challenged ten-term Republican incumbent Curt Weldon in the race, and proved a capable fundraiser. In the second quarter of 2006, he raised $704,000 to Weldon's $692,000; in the third, $1.14 million to $912,000. As of September 30, 2006, Sestak had $1.53 million cash on hand, while Weldon had $1.12 million in the bank after making a $500,000 TV ad buy that had not started as of the close of the third quarter. Sestak received campaign donations from people around the world, including performer Jimmy Buffett, John Grisham, Bill and Hillary Clinton, and many Naval officers.

A late September 2006 poll showed Sestak and Weldon locked in a statistical dead heat. Sestak led Weldon 44-43 among likely voters in a Franklin & Marshall College Keystone Poll released September 29. The poll also found that 49% of registered voters in the district felt it was time for change in the district and only 37% said Weldon deserved reelection. The numbers suggested Sestak had seriously eroded Weldon's previous lead; an April 2006 poll conducted by the pro-Democratic Party organization Democracy Corps had Weldon leading 51% to 41%. On October 6 the nonpartisan Cook Political Report moved the race from "Lean Republican" to "Toss Up". An October 8–10 survey by nonpartisan pollster Constituent Dynamics put Sestak ahead 51–44. On October 13 CQPolitics moved the race from "Leans Republican" to "No Clear Favorite". The race remained a dead heat until late October, when FBI special agents raided the homes of Weldon's daughter and a close friend in connection with a federal corruption probe (neither has ever been charged with a crime). Sestak won by 13 points.

Sestak became the second Democrat to represent the 7th since 1939, and the first since Bob Edgar gave up the seat after six terms to run for Senate. Weldon succeeded him and had held the seat since. The district had historically been a classic Rockefeller Republican area, but had become more competitive at the national level since the 1990s. It had gone Democratic in every presidential election since 1992, even as Weldon never faced a close contest before 2006.

The race was in the national spotlight, as it was profiled in Time magazine as the harbinger of the national political climate of the 2006 elections and the most-watched swing district in the country.

2008

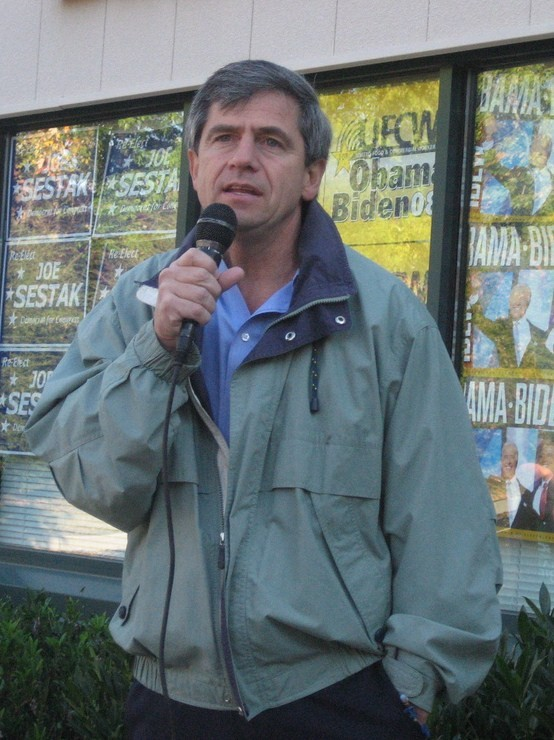
Sestak at a campaign event in October 2008

In 2008, Sestak faced Republican nominee Wendell Craig Williams, a U.S. Marine and attorney. Sestak defeated him by a 20-point margin (59.6% to 40.4%), eight points more than his 2006 margin. He purchased no advertisements, and his largest expense was lawn signs.

=== Legislation and key votes ===
Sestak wrote various pieces of bipartisan legislation that successfully passed Congress. In 2008 the National Journal placed him "at the ideological center of the House". House Majority Leader Steny Hoyer named Sestak the most productive freshman member of Congress in 2007, with 19 pieces of legislation passing in the House during the 110th Congress, including the Elder Abuse Victims Act, the first bill on elder abuse to pass the House in 17 years. In the 111th United States Congress, Sestak's last term in office, Congress passed more bills written by Sestak than bills written by both of Pennsylvania's senators combined.

Most significantly, Sestak created the House Pediatric Cancer Caucus, which he co-chaired; extended benefits for those seeking work (COBRA) as a part of the JOBS bill; co-wrote the amendment to give small businesses tax credits, as a part of health care reform; and moved the first significant federal funds into autism care and research, nicknamed the "Sestak Amendment".

As Congress's senior veteran, Sestak was an original cosponsor of the repeal of Don't Ask, Don't Tell as well as the repeal of the Defense of Marriage Act. He also strongly advocated for ending bailouts to banks as part of the 2009 Dodd-Frank Wall Street Reform Bill. Sestak voted for the American Recovery and Reinvestment Act of 2009 but lamented that it did not provide enough accountability measures. He also voted for the Lilly Ledbetter Fair Pay Act of 2009, the American Clean Energy and Security Act, and the Affordable Health Care for America Act.

Some of his legislation that generated attention but eventually failed included researching potential adoption and expansion of thorium-based nuclear power, and the first legislation to restrict the effects of Citizens United v. Federal Election Commission.

=== Social media ===
In 2007 Sestak's campaign was the first federal campaign to create a Facebook Fan Page. Sestak joined Twitter shortly before he was sworn in for his second term. His congressional account made him the first congressperson on Twitter to use it on an official basis. After he left office his social networks were merged with his personal accounts, which have been verified.

Sestak is said to have been a prime example of the Colbert Bump. After appearing on "The Colbert Report" in 2008, Sestak spoke of the positive impact of social media and viral video clips of the appearance. He appeared on the show even after Democratic leaders Rahm Emanuel and Nancy Pelosi instructed Democrats not to. After his first appearance, Sestak won his election in a landslide in a Republican majority district, and after appearing again in 2009 as a part of his announcement of his candidacy against incumbent Senator Arlen Specter in the 2010 Democratic primary, Sestak won by a surprising eight points. He did not appear on the show during the 2010 general election, which he narrowly lost. The day after the loss, host Stephen Colbert lamented the loss on air, calling Sestak a "friend".

=== Congressional staff ===
Sestak and his staff were recognized for their successful tenure and he was voted "The Most Productive Member of Congress".

Sestak focused heavily on the constituent services his office provided the people of his district as he entered Congress just as the Great Recession began, homes were being foreclosed, and health care and other services were being denied as people lost their jobs and missed payments. During his four years in Congress from 2007 to 2011, Sestak's office handled 18,000 cases, between three and four times the number of the average congressional office. "Every person who has worked for me has been tremendous," he said. Sestak hosted an average of 15 large summit gatherings in his district each year on key issues.

Some critics were quick to cite Sestak's handling of his Congressional staff as supporting "the perception that he is a taskmaster with a prickly streak." During his first term in office, Sestak employed 61 people as staff in his official congressional office, while comparable representatives employed a total of 28, 26, and 25 staff members, indicating that Sestak had a high turnover rate, although a number of them were interns or had been hired as temporary staff members. The Hill reported that several former staffers said that "aides are expected to work seven days a week, including holidays, often 14 hours each day, going for months without a day off. These are very long hours even by Capitol Hill standards". A former aide added that Sestak's staff turnover was not as much of a drawback as one might expect. "Other Members rely on their staff to keep themselves informed, but with him, it's top-down," the former aide said. "He knows what he wants to accomplish, so in a sense, he just needs people to dictate to." Sestak acknowledged that his aides spend long hours on duty and that the work is "pretty demanding". He added that the staff was becoming stabler over time, with the turnover rate normalizing by the end of his second term.

Contemporaneous staff accounts were published in the Delaware County Times, including that of Clarence Tong, a spokesman who had been with Sestak since the campaign, who said "They're getting off. The only person who does work Sunday is someone who travels with the congressman when he goes to different constituent meetings... I think the reality is, my boss doesn't deny he asks a lot of people who work for him ... I think he's someone who's very fair to work for"; Ashley Miller, a former aide, who said, "We were working long hours, there's no doubt about that, but it was absolutely what was needed to do it. None of us were happy leaving things half done at the end of the day"; Bryan Branton, Sestak's former chief of staff, who said, "Every freshman office has to work that much harder because you're starting an office from scratch. The people who have since left the campaign have done so because they had other things they were planning on doing"; and Ryan Rudominer, Sestak's communications director during the campaign, who said, "Just like it took hard work to defeat a 20-year incumbent ... it takes hard work to pass as much legislation as Joe has passed as a first-term congressman, to hold as many summits and town halls as Joe has held and to be as responsive to constituents as Joe is."

=== 2008 presidential election ===
Sestak endorsed Hillary Clinton for president in the 2008 Democratic primaries and served as her campaign national security adviser, specializing in veterans. He told Stephen Colbert on The Colbert Report that he trusted her leadership after serving with her in the White House. In addition to being Clinton's foreign policy adviser, Sestak served as her superdelegate and was a surrogate throughout the primary, making appearances at several rallies and on television, including in an ad emphasizing Clinton's foreign policy strengths.

Sestak endorsed Barack Obama in the general election after Obama received the Democratic nomination.

=== Committee assignments ===
- Committee on Armed Services
  - Subcommittee on Seapower and Expeditionary Forces
  - Subcommittee on Air and Land Forces
  - Subcommittee on Oversight and Investigations
- Committee on Education and Labor
  - Subcommittee on Early Childhood, Elementary and Secondary Education
  - Subcommittee on Health, Employment, Labor, and Pensions
- Committee on Small Business (Vice Chair)
  - Subcommittee on Finance and Tax
  - Subcommittee on Contracting and Technology
  - Subcommittee on Regulations, Healthcare and Trade

== 2010 U.S. Senate election ==
=== Primary election ===
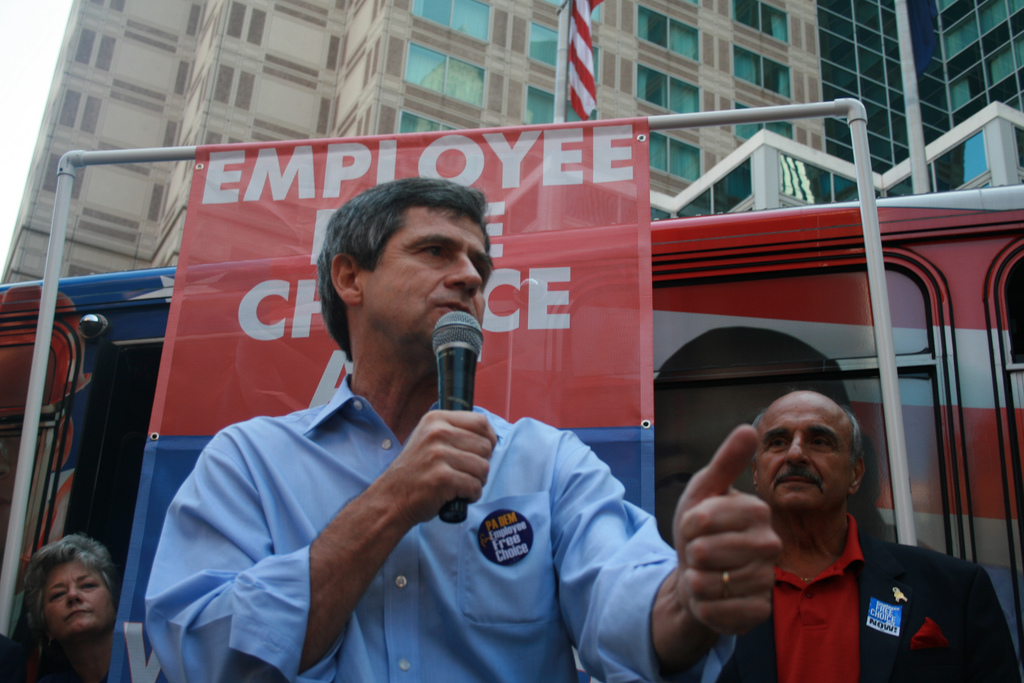
Sestak speaking at an "Employee Free Choice Act Rally" at the Pennsylvania State Democratic Convention in Pittsburgh in June 2009

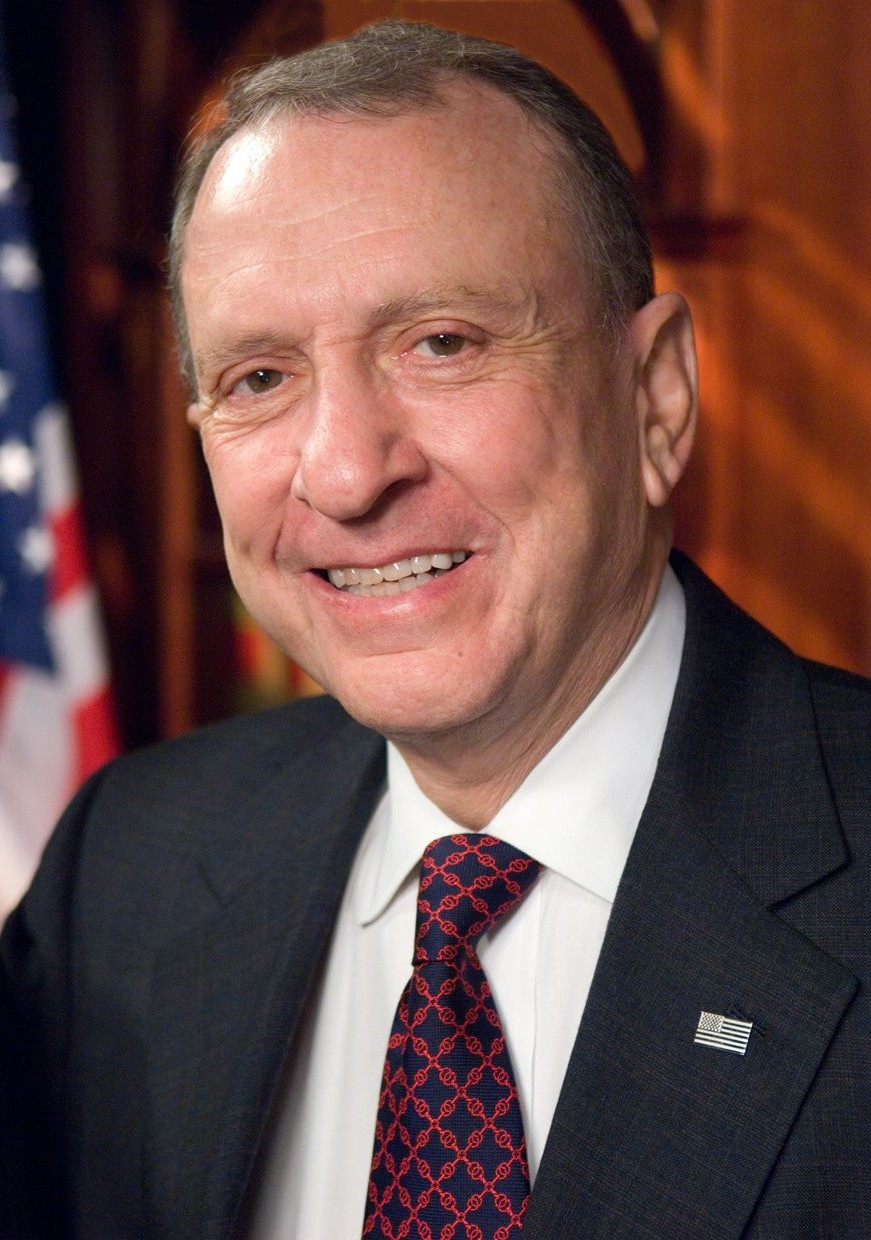
Sestak ran against Arlen Specter.

Whispers of a possible U.S. Senate campaign appeared in 2008 after Sestak's landslide victory and $3 million campaign surplus after his reelection. Even before Arlen Specter's announcement to switch parties, draft efforts were organized. But after Specter switched from a Republican to a Democrat to ensure that (once Al Franken was seated) Democrats had a filibuster-proof 60-vote majority, Democrats, including President Obama and Governor Rendell, promised to support Specter in both the primary and the general election. Nationwide support mounted for Sestak's possible senatorial campaign, a primary challenge to Specter. Most prominent was a straw poll conducted by the Progressive Change Campaign Committee titled, "Should a Draft Sestak movement be created to take on Sen. Arlen Specter in the Pennsylvania Democratic primary?" Almost 8,000 votes were cast nationwide, with 86% responding yes, including 85% of Pennsylvanians.

Sestak faced significant opposition to his candidacy from President Obama, Vice President Joe Biden, the national Democratic Party and the state party, even though Sestak pointed out Specter's humiliation of Anita Hill during her testimony about her harassment by Supreme Court Justice Clarence Thomas and other votes of Specter's. Then-Pennsylvania Governor Ed Rendell said on national television, "Joe Sestak should not run for the Senate in the Democratic primary." Sestak responded, "there's no more kings, there's no more kingmakers in America," and proceeded to visit all 67 counties of Pennsylvania.

On May 27, 2009, Sestak indicated that he intended to challenge Specter in the 2010 Democratic primary (pending a final family decision because he had not "had the time to sit down with my eight-year-old daughter or my wife to make sure that we are all ready to get in"). In June he was overheard saying "[i]t would take an act of God for me to not get in now". In a Quinnipiac University Polling Institute poll conducted May 20–26, Specter led the Democratic primary with 50 percent, with Sestak at 21 percent and 27 percent undecided. Despite the gap, it was noted that Sestak did not have much statewide recognition at the time, as he represented only one of Pennsylvania's 19 congressional districts.

On August 4 Sestak officially announced his candidacy. His brother, Richard, was his campaign manager. In discussing Specter's switch from the Republican to the Democratic Party, Sestak has said that the switch was "100 percent" motivated by politics.

==== Democratic opposition ====
Throughout the primary election the Obama administration and the Democratic Party campaigned heavily against Sestak, as the President, Vice President, and numerous cabinet members and Senators hosted many fundraisers and events for Specter. On September 19, 2009, Senate Majority Leader Harry Reid even shut down the entire United States Senate, as he, the President, and many senators instead flew to Philadelphia to host a prominent fundraiser for Specter. The event drew controversy for closing federal business and because the money raised during the event would be given to Republicans and conservative PACs that asked for refunds of contributions given before Specter's party switch. Obama's presidential campaign, called "Organizing for America" during the off years, also led efforts against Sestak. Even the Democratic Senatorial Campaign Committee (DSCC) decided to spend the maximum "coordinated funds" for Specter, which differ from most party spending in that the committee can use the money to work with the candidate and supplement his or her ad buys.

==== Job offer to Sestak ====
In a February 2010 interview Sestak responded affirmatively when asked if the Obama administration had offered him a "federal job" if he would end his candidacy for the Senate. Sestak stated that he had quickly refused the offer. When asked to give the specifics of the offer on Midweek Politics with David Pakman, he refused. The White House initially "vociferously" denied that an offer had been made, and Sestak continued to offer no further details until the Obama administration released White House Counsel Robert F. Bauer's official report on the incident on May 28, clarifying that White House Chief of Staff Rahm Emanuel enlisted former President Bill Clinton to approach Sestak about potential, uncompensated executive branch positions on senior advisory boards and stating Bauer's official opinion that nothing inappropriate, illegal or unethical had taken place. The official report also stated that Clinton had made the offer on behalf of the Obama administration. After the report's release, Sestak issued a statement essentially confirming it.

Republican Congressman Darrell Issa, the minority leader on the House Committee on Oversight and Government Reform, initially alleged that such an offer and Sestak's failure to report it could be felonies. Legal analysts disagreed, and Issa subsequently backtracked and dismissed the issue; his spokesperson said, "it was a mistake", and Issa said, "as we discovered, that it turns out that Republicans and previous administrations thought it was OK."

==== Primary result ====
Specter held a 20-point lead in polls as late as April 2010, and enjoyed support from the Democratic establishment, including Rendell and Philadelphia Mayor Michael Nutter, with the latter trying to mobilize voters in that city for Specter. A moderate Republican, Specter had switched parties after polls showed him likely being defeated by the more conservative Pat Toomey in the Republican primary, a rematch of the 2004 nomination contest where Specter narrowly defeated Toomey. Sestak attacked Specter's switch as "self-interested", and the move was disapproved of by a majority of registered Democrats in Pennsylvania, while a "fervent anti-incumbent mood" prevailed nationwide in the 2010 midterm elections. The Sestak campaign also ran an ad showing Specter with President George W. Bush, which seriously damaged Specter's standing. Sestak gained momentum in the last days of the primary contest as the turnout in Philadelphia for Specter failed to meet expectations.

At a little after 10 p.m. on May 18 the Associated Press called the primary for Sestak, 54%-46%.

=== General election ===
Many cited the Pennsylvania Senate general election as the "marquee race of 2010", a bellwether of the national stage. After securing the Democratic Party's nomination, calling it "a win for the people, over the establishment, over the status quo, even over Washington, DC," Sestak enjoyed a slight lead in the polls against the Republican nominee, former Congressman and Club for Growth President Pat Toomey. But while Sestak tried to recoup his financial losses after a long primary, Toomey had not faced a competitive primary and aired TV ads much earlier than Sestak. Toomey's effective fundraising and advertising allowed him to rise in the polls, at one point gaining a double-digit lead, causing political pundits to move the race from "Toss Up" to "Lean Republican". Many stopped short of calling the race "Solid Republican" as Sestak had a reputation for campaigning until he "sees the whites of their eyes" and 11th-hour comebacks.

Sestak began airing ads in mid-fall and overcame his deficit in opinion polls, closing to within the margin of error. Toomey had been running unanswered ads depicting Sestak as a liberal for several months before the DSCC purchased airtime toward the end of the campaign. At the beginning of election night Sestak led in the exit polls by a wide margin, but as more votes were counted and central Pennsylvania's "red T" area began reporting, Toomey caught up. Counting continued until early morning, as the numbers were too close for a winner to be declared. As the percentages stabilized, it became clear Toomey was the winner. Sestak conceded the race to a ballroom full of his supporters at the Radnor Hotel. Toomey defeated Sestak, 51% to 49%, a margin of 80,229 votes out of almost four million cast, a margin large enough to avoid a recount. Percentage-wise, it was the smallest losing margin of any Pennsylvania Democratic candidate in 2010.

The total spent on the race was $20 million, the most of any federal election in 2010. After Citizens United v. Federal Election Commission was decided, conservative Political Action Committees and corporations broke the record for outside spending, airing ads on Toomey's behalf and causing Sestak to be outspent 3 to 1. Sestak received little help from the Democratic Senatorial Campaign Committee (DSCC), which had spent significantly to assist Specter in the primary. The gap between pro-Toomey and pro-Sestak ads was the largest of any Senate race in the nation. Sestak responded to this outside spending at Philadelphia Constitution Hall, arguing, "It is we, the people. Not we, the corporations, nor we, Wall Street." Despite the funding gap, Sestak outperformed Pennsylvania's Democratic gubernatorial nominee, who lost by 9%, as well as the four Democratic Representatives who lost reelection by broad margins (Patrick Murphy by 7%, Paul Kanjorski by 9%, Kathy Dahlkemper by 11%, and Chris Carney by 10%).

Sestak returned to each of Pennsylvania's 67 counties to thank his supporters, including numerous African American churches, synagogues, and mosques that had welcomed him.

== 2016 U.S. Senate election ==
After his defeat, Sestak served as a professor at Cheyney University, the oldest historically black university in America, and as a Distinguished Practice Professor at Carnegie Mellon University's Heinz College. In May 2013 he was named the 2013–14 recipient of the General Omar N. Bradley Chair in Strategic Leadership, a joint initiative among the United States Army War College, Dickinson College and the Pennsylvania State University – Dickinson School of Law. Previous recipients of the Bradley Chair include former Assistant Secretary of State Philip J. Crowley and retired Major General John D. Altenburg. Sestak taught courses on "Ethical Leadership" and "Restoring the American Dream".

Sestak remained active in public service through the Center for Refugee and Disaster Response at the Johns Hopkins Bloomberg School of Public Health; the Ploughshares Fund working on nuclear disarmament; the Lenfest Foundation focused on education in Philadelphia, pre-K through early childhood, and those in danger of leaving or having left high school; co-chair with former Republican governor Mark Schweiker of the Pennsylvania State Advisory Committee of the U.S. Global Leadership Coalition, focused on U.S. diplomacy and development; and then-Secretary of State Clinton's Advisory Committee on U.S. educational programs.

This issue is, who has your back? [Toomey's] approach is, 'You're on your own.' Mine is to advance individual opportunity.

— Sestak on why he was running again.

=== Primary election ===
In 2013 Sestak announced he was considering a rematch with Toomey. In September 2014, as he campaigned with 2014 gubernatorial nominee Tom Wolf, he said he would make an official announcement soon. In November 2014 he sent out an email confirming that he would run, and in March 2015 he officially launched his campaign by walking 422 miles across Pennsylvania from the New Jersey to the Ohio borders, holding town hall meetings each day, saying throughout his campaign kickoff and the remainder of the election that "we are in a fight for the soul of America." Sestak simultaneously published his vision in a policy-based book, Walking in Your Shoes to Restore the American Dream, co-authored with Jake Sternberger.

If Sestak had been nominated to run against Toomey in 2016 it would have been the first rematch for a United States Senate seat in Pennsylvania history. But starting in early 2015 after he refused to hire a party-approved campaign manager and other designated staffers as well as Washington, D.C.–based political consultants and firms, Sestak faced considerable opposition from the Democratic Senatorial Campaign Committee (DSCC) and EMILY's List. Many establishment Democrats also resented Sestak for defeating Arlen Specter in the 2010 primary. Sestak had led consistently in the polls, sometimes by as much as 17 points, though national Democrats including Obama encouraged six candidates to challenge Sestak in the primary, with Katie McGinty emerging as the establishment's preferred nominee. The DSCC provided over $1.5 million to McGinty's campaign, when no other non-incumbent Democrat in the nation received more than $14,000, with over $6 million being spent by pro-McGinty Super PACs on mailings, digital ads, and TV commercials. One of the commercials was an attack ad that the Washington Post assigned its highest rating of falsity and called "a sleazy way to win a campaign." Sestak's initial lead in polls dwindled and McGinty won the April 26 Democratic primary. The national Democrats' meddling in the primary was largely unpopular with their liberal base, as Sestak consistently polled higher than McGinty in a hypothetical matchup against Toomey. The Toomey campaign had also regarded Sestak as a stronger challenger since he was "a political outsider, well-attuned to the public's anti-establishment mood." In what was, at the time, the most expensive election for a U.S. Senate seat, Toomey narrowly defeated McGinty to win reelection.

== 2020 presidential campaign ==
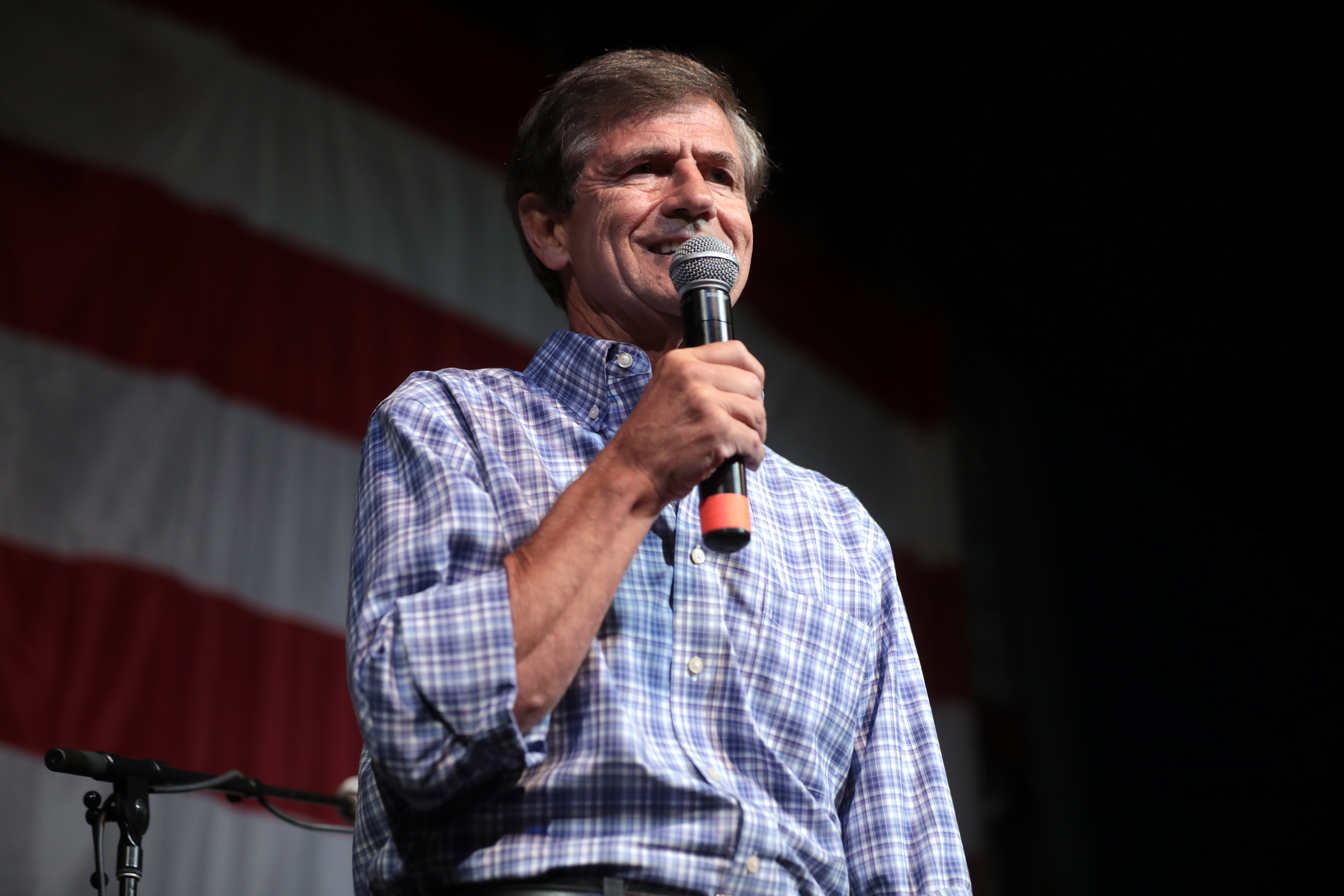
Sestak campaigning in Clear Lake, Iowa in August 2019

On June 23, 2019, Sestak announced his candidacy for the Democratic nomination for president in the 2020 election in a video posted on his website. Sestak entered the race days before the first Democratic presidential debate was held, and did not participate in any debates held in subsequent months, failing to meet the minimum requirements for eligibility. He attracted very little media attention and never polled above 1%. On December 1, 2019, he ended his bid for the Democratic nomination. He endorsed Amy Klobuchar on February 7, 2020.

== Political positions ==
=== Abortion ===
Sestak is pro-choice, holding a 100% rating from NARAL Pro-Choice America and a 0% rating from the National Right to Life Committee. NARAL endorsed Sestak over Specter in the 2010 Democratic primary because of Sestak's opposition to a ban on partial-birth abortion. In 2009 Sestak's invitation to speak to students at the Catholic Malvern Preparatory School was rescinded after parents and alumni objected. The cancellation was protested by many Malvern Seniors who staged a class walkout on the day of the scheduled talk.

=== Economy ===
Sestak supports requiring Congress to offset the cost of all new spending. He also supports expanding middle-class tax cuts and letting the Bush tax cuts expire. He voted for the American Recovery and Reinvestment Act of 2009 and the Tax Extenders and Alternative Minimum Tax Relief Act of 2008.

=== Education ===
Sestak voted for the Improving Head Start Act and the College Cost Reduction and Access Act. He has a 100% lifetime rating from the National Education Association.

=== Environment ===
Sestak voted for the Waxman Markey American Clean Energy and Security Act (Cap and Trade) program. He has a 96% lifetime rating from the League of Conservation Voters and a 100% rating from PennEnvironment. Sestak was endorsed by the Sierra Club in his 2006 and 2008 Congressional election campaigns. He voted for the Renewable Energy and Energy Conservation Tax Act of 2007 and the New Direction for Energy Independence, National Security and Consumer Protection Act, and was an original cosponsor of the Climate Stewardship Act (H.R. 620) and the Safe Climate Act.

=== Gun rights ===
Sestak supports gun control. He has a 100% rating from the Brady Campaign to Prevent Gun Violence and an F rating from the NRA Political Victory Fund.

Sestak has called for reinstatement of the federal ban on assault weapons.

=== Healthcare ===
Sestak credits his support for health care reform as "payback" to the country that gave him and his family health care while he was in the Navy (the TRICARE program), especially for successfully treating his daughter's brain tumor. He supports state-provided preventive care and voted for the CHAMP Act. Sestak originally co-sponsored the Medicare Prescription Drug Price Negotiations Act, the Caroline Pryce Walker Conquer Childhood Cancer Act and co-sponsored H.R. 3800, which establishes a public-private Partnership for Health Care Improvement. He also announced the Pediatric Cancer Caucus, which he will co-chair. He is also a member of the Autism Caucus, Diabetes Caucus, 21st Century Health Care Caucus, Congressional Mental Health Caucus, Nursing Caucus, and Cystic Fibrosis Caucus.

=== Iran nuclear deal ===
Sestak cosigned, with 35 other retired admirals and generals, a letter endorsing the proposed 2015 Iran nuclear deal, and went on national television to defend the deal.

=== Unions ===
Sestak is an original cosponsor of the Employee Free Choice Act and supports the original version that includes card check. He created the Labor Advisory Committee to address the challenges facing working families in his district. Sestak holds a 97% lifetime rating from the AFL-CIO.

=== Medical marijuana ===
Sestak voted to allow states to regulate medical marijuana by voting for the Commerce, Justice, Science, and Related Agencies Appropriations Act of 2008, which would have barred the Department of Justice from preventing the implementation of state laws regarding the distribution, possession, and cultivation of medical marijuana. The bill was defeated 165–262.

=== Military ===
As a candidate, Sestak campaigned to end the war in Iraq. Once in office, in 2007, he supported Congressional efforts to redeploy forces and submitted legislation for commencing the redeployment, allowing one year to safely withdraw the troops. He also voted for the war supplemental the House constructed after President Bush's veto, a bill many critics of the Bush administration called a "blank check" for the four month continuation of administration policies in the Middle East. In response, Sestak and other veterans argued that they should not punish soldiers for the President's actions, and supported the bill in order to give the armed forces adequate protection and equipment until withdrawn for the one year it would take to do it safely.

Sestak supported the FISA Amendments Act of 2008, which critics contended continued the Bush administration's policy of warrantless wiretapping and provided retroactive immunity to telecommunications companies who participated in the National Security Agency's "terrorist surveillance program".

Sestak supported the deployment of additional troops to Afghanistan in late 2009, and military actions such as drone strikes in northwest Pakistan. He supported a gradual draw-down of troops from Iraq.

Sestak was an opponent of the "don't ask, don't tell" policy that excluded LGBT people from serving openly in the United States military, stating that the policy means "[w]e're absolutely not adhering to the ideals of our nation". He was instrumental in bringing to light a two-year pattern of abuse, including anti-gay hazing, that took place in a Military Working Dog unit stationed in Bahrain, sparking an investigation that turned up nearly 100 instances of abuse.

== Electoral history ==
2006 U.S. House election, 7th district of Pennsylvania
Party	Candidate	Votes	%	±%
Democratic	Joe Sestak	147,347	56.4	N/A
Republican	Curt Weldon (incumbent)	114,056	43.6	−15.2
Majority		33,291	12.8	
Turnout		261,403		
Democratic gain from Republican		Swing		

2008 U.S. House election, 7th district of Pennsylvania
Party	Candidate	Votes	%	±%
Democratic	Joe Sestak (incumbent)	209,955	59.6	+3.2
Republican	Wendell Craig Williams	142,362	40.4	N/A
Majority		67,593	19.2	+6.5
Turnout		352,317		
Democratic hold		Swing		

2010 United States Senate Democratic primary in Pennsylvania
Party	Candidate	Votes	%
Democratic	Joe Sestak	568,563	53.9
Democratic	Arlen Specter (incumbent)	487,217	46.1
Total votes		1,055,780	100

United States Senate election in Pennsylvania, 2010
Party	Candidate	Votes	%	±%
Republican	Pat Toomey	2,028,945	51.01%	−1.61%
Democratic	Joe Sestak	1,948,716	48.99%	+7.00%
Majority		80,229	2.02%	
Total votes		3,977,661	100.0	
Republican gain from Democratic		Swing		

2016 United States Senate Democratic primary in Pennsylvania
Party	Candidate	Votes	%
Democratic	Katie McGinty	669,774	42.50
Democratic	Joe Sestak	513,221	32.57
Democratic	John Fetterman	307,090	19.49
Democratic	Joseph Vodvarka	85,837	5.45
Total votes		1,575,922	100.00

== Nonprofit work ==
In 2017, Sestak became the first president of FIRST Global, a nonprofit founded by Dean Kamen with the objective of promoting STEM education and careers in the developing world through Olympics-style robotics competitions.

In July 2017, the inaugural FIRST Global Challenge brought together high school student teams from 157 countries. Afghanistan's team made headlines when its visa requests were denied twice and it almost missed the competition, until President Donald Trump intervened to urge the State Department authorities to reconsider. The five girls were granted entry to the U.S. less than a week before the competition. Each country that applied to be in the competition, including those on the Trump Administration's travel ban list—from Iran to a Syrian Refugee team—obtained U.S. visas to attend the competition.

Women were responsible for leading, organizing, or funding 60% of all nations' teams. 84 of the teams had not had either STEM education or robotics. Sestak established "The Global STEM Corps" of approximately 800 U.S. and international college, high school, and other STEM volunteers to "adopt" a team for online assistance in the engineering and electronics "best assemblage" of their robot for the game competition.

== Personal life ==
Sestak is married to the former Susan L. Clark, who works in international environmental issues from Kazakhstan to Mozambique; Russian relations, including the U.S. team searching for clues for Prisoners of War/Missing in Action within Soviet Union archives; and on suicide prevention for the Veterans Administration and Department of Defense. In childhood, their daughter Alexandra survived brain cancer twice, at four years old and again near adulthood, before dying of the disease in June 2020 at age 19.

U.S. House of Representatives
Preceded by Curt Weldon	Member of the U.S. House of Representatives from Pennsylvania's 7th congressional district 2007–2011	Succeeded by Pat Meehan
Party political offices
Preceded by Joe Hoeffel	Democratic nominee for U.S. Senator from Pennsylvania (Class 3); 2010	Succeeded by Katie McGinty
U.S. order of precedence (ceremonial)
Preceded by Patrick Murphy as Former U.S. Representative	Order of precedence of the United States as Former U.S. Representative	Succeeded by Ryan Costello as Former U.S. Representative
