= Krupský potok =

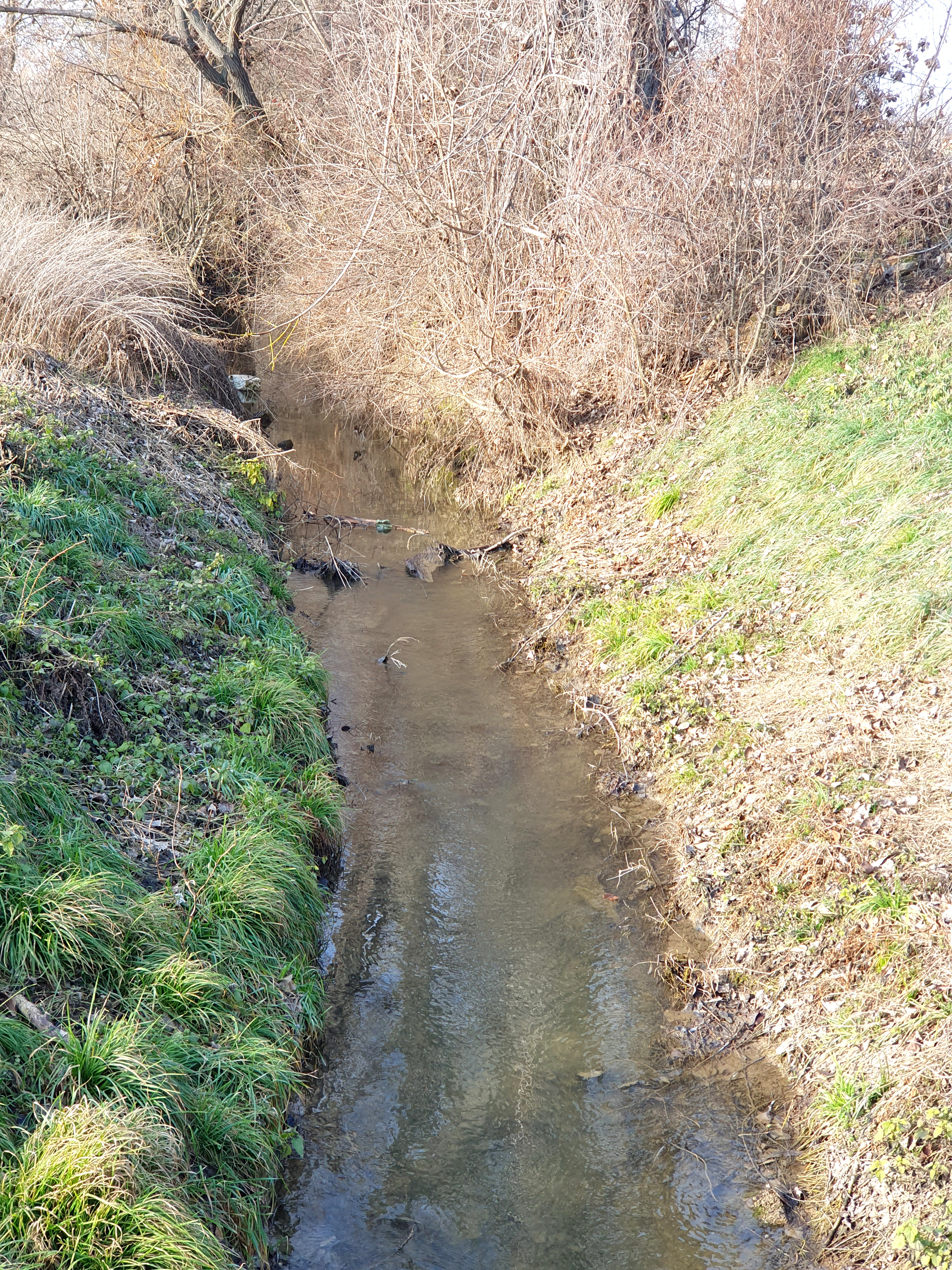

Location
- Country: Slovakia
- Counties: Trnava
- Villages: Prekážka, Horná Krupá, Dolná Krupá, Špačince, Dolné Lovčice

Physical characteristics
- Source
  - location: Okrúhla, Little Carpathians
  - elevation: 350 m (1,150 ft)
- Mouth: Dolná Blava
  - location: Dolné Lovčice
  - coordinates: 48.3608°N 17.6836°E
  - elevation: 132 m (433 ft)
- Length: 30.7 km (19.1 mi)
- Basin size: 131 km^{2} (51 sq mi)

Basin features
- Progression: Dolná Blava→ Dolný Dudváh→ Čierna voda→ Little Danube→ Váh→ Danube→ Black Sea

The Krupský potok is a tributary of the Dolná Blava in Trnava District, Western Slovakia. Its source is located near Okrúhla in the Little Carpathians Mountains. It flows into the Dolná Blava in Dolné Lovčice. It is 30.7 km (19.1 mi) long and its basin size is 131 km^{2} (51 sq mi).
