= Dolná Blava =

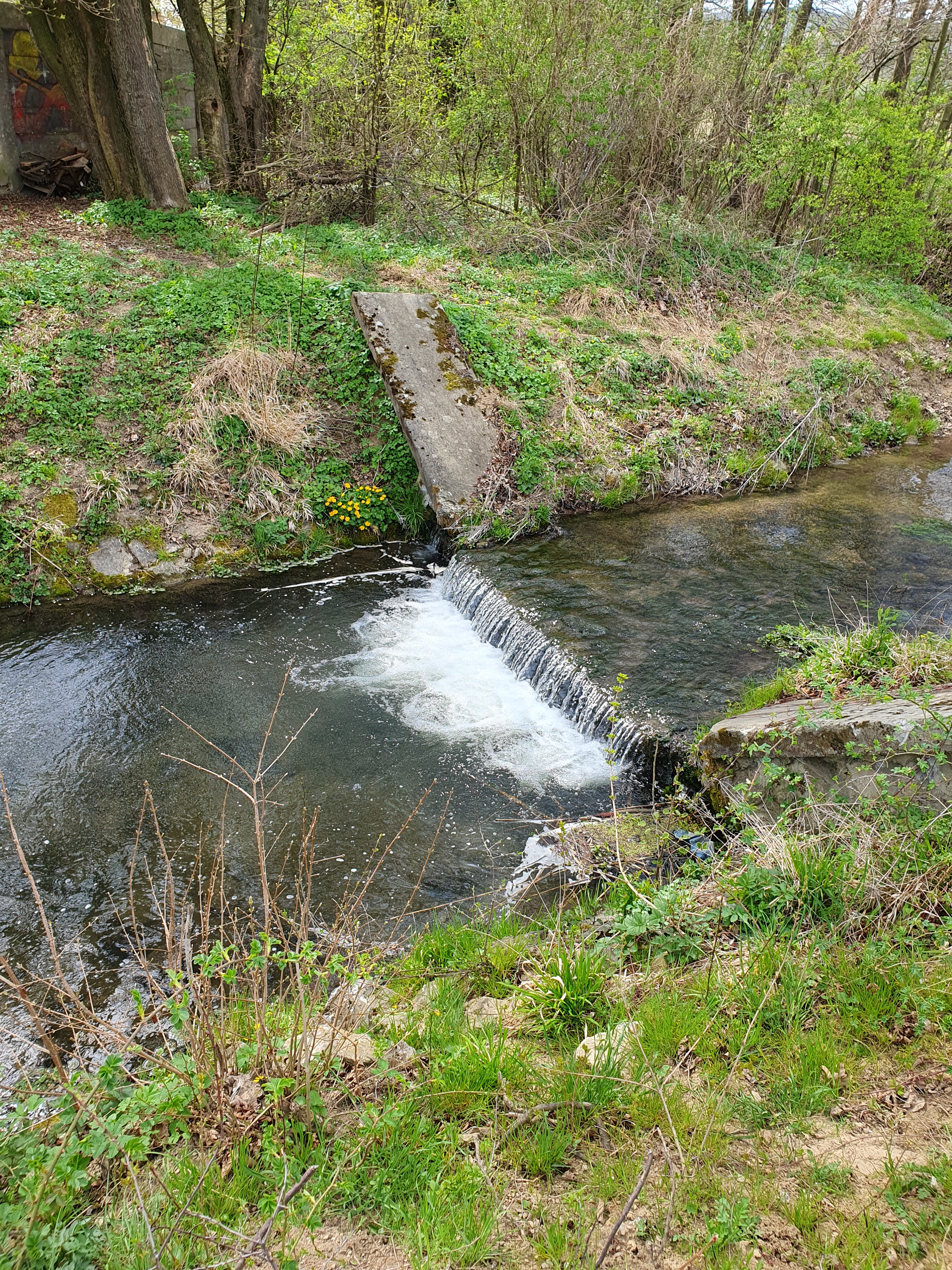

Location
- Country: Slovakia

Physical characteristics
- Mouth
  - location: Dolný Dudváh
  - coordinates: 48.330°N 17.669°E
- Length: 9.8 km (6.1 mi)
- Basin size: 143 km^{2} (55 sq mi)

Basin features
- Progression: Dolný Dudváh→ Čierna voda→ Little Danube→ Váh→ Danube→ Black Sea
- Tributaries
  - right: Krupský potok

The Dolná Blava is a right tributary of the Dolný Dudváh in Trnava District, Western Slovakia. It flows into the Dolný Dudváh near Križovany nad Dudváhom. It is 9.8 km (6.1 mi) long and its basin size is 143 km^{2} (55 sq mi).
