= 2010 United States Senate Democratic primary election in Pennsylvania =

2010 United States Senate Democratic primary in Pennsylvania
- May 18, 2010
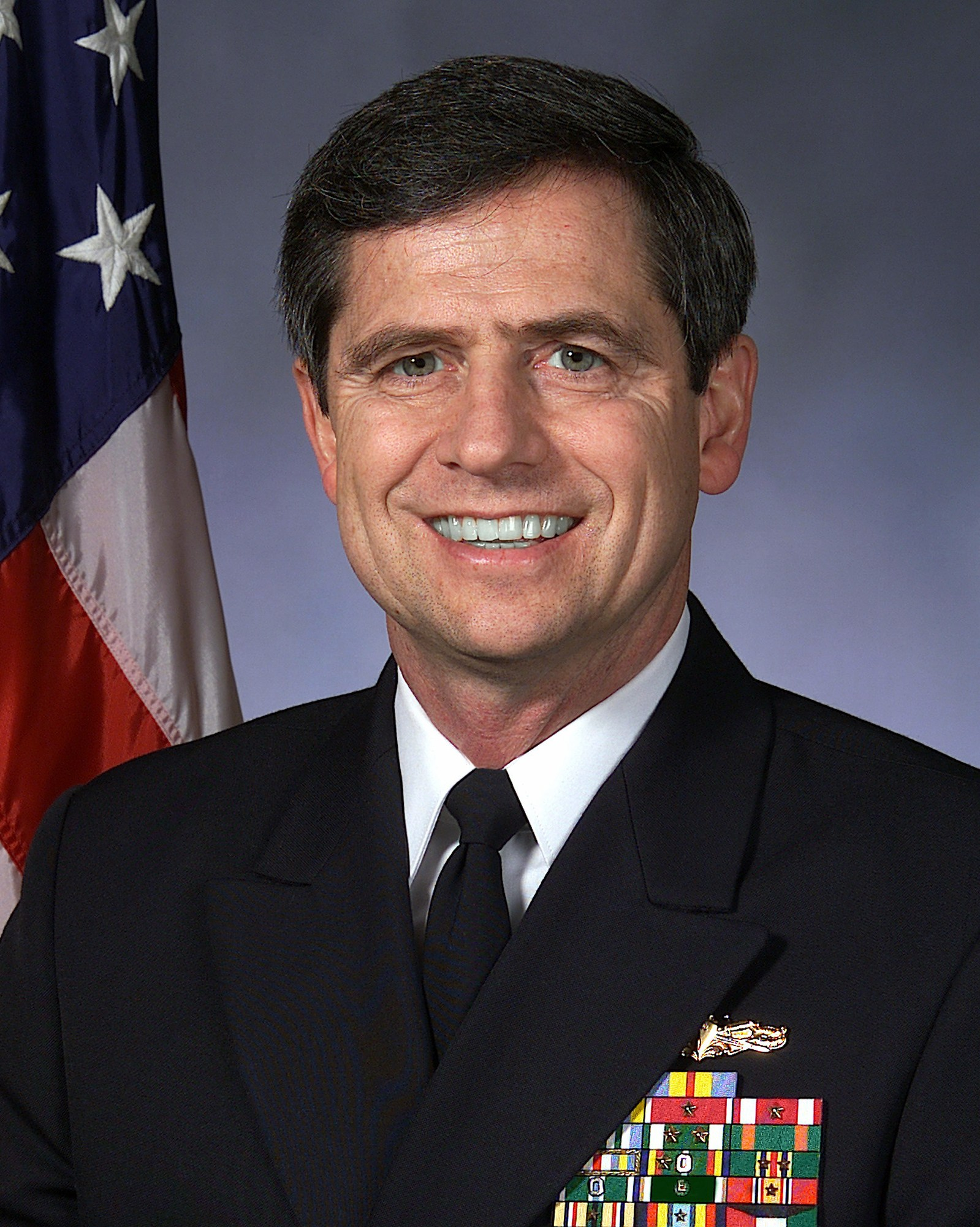

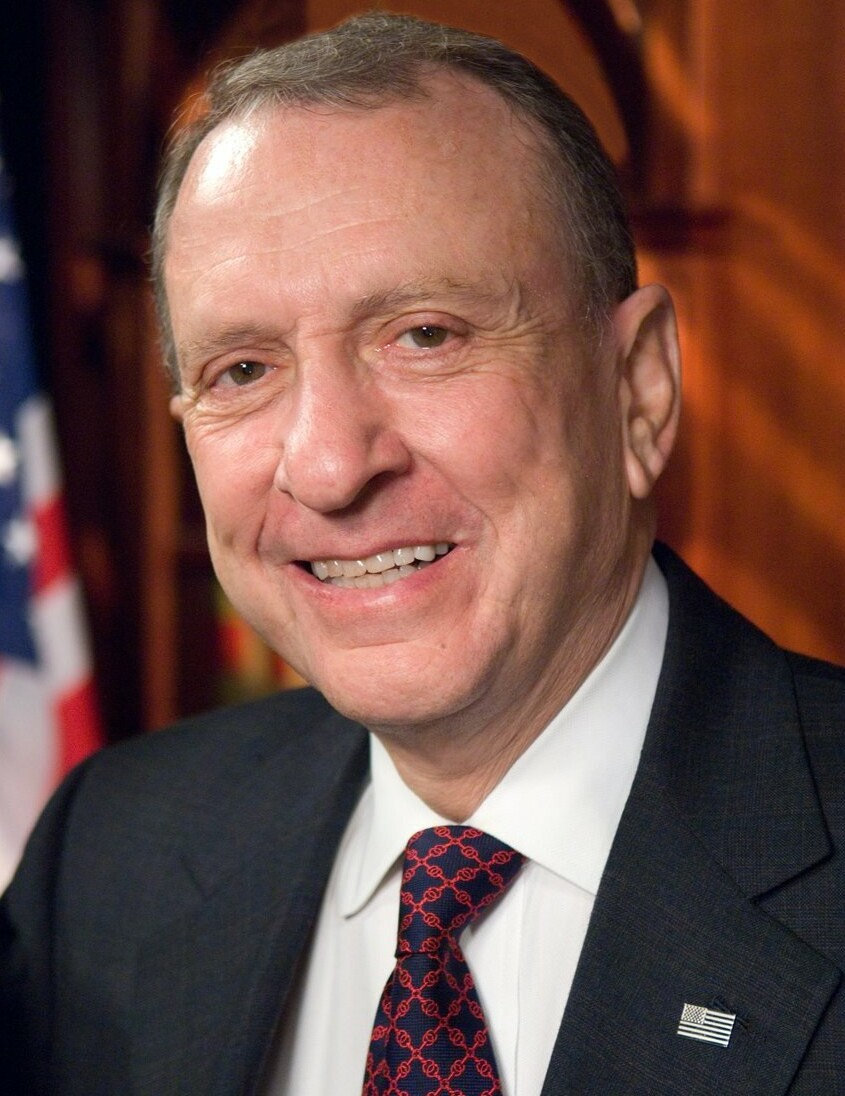
Nominee	Joe Sestak	Arlen Specter
Party	Democratic	Democratic
Popular vote	568,563	487,217
Percentage	53.8%	46.2%
- County results Sestak: 50–60% 60–70% Specter: 50–60% 60–70%

The Democratic Party primary for the 2010 United States Senate election in Pennsylvania took place on May 18, 2010, when Congressman Joe Sestak defeated incumbent Arlen Specter, which led to the end of Specter's five-term Senatorial career. Just before the start of the primary campaign, after serving in the Senate as a Republican for 29 years, Specter had switched to the Democratic Party in anticipation of a difficult primary challenge by Pat Toomey; Toomey ultimately defeated Sestak in the general election. Political observers and journalists described the race between Specter and Sestak as one of the bitterest and most-watched of all the 2010 primary elections.

Although Sestak was initially urged to run by the Democratic establishment, Specter gained broad support from Democrats after he switched parties. Prominent political figures like President Barack Obama and Pennsylvania governor Ed Rendell later tried to sway Sestak from continuing the race, fearing he would damage Specter's chances in the general election. Former President Bill Clinton offered Sestak a position in the Obama administration if he withdrew his candidacy, an offer Republicans would later criticize. Sestak refused to drop out and criticized Specter's party switch as an opportunistic move aimed solely at self-preservation. Nevertheless, Sestak struggled to overcome problems stemming from low name recognition and Specter's support from such individuals as Joe Biden and Harry Reid, and organizations like the AFL–CIO and Pennsylvania Democratic Committee.

Specter led Sestak by more than 20 percentage points for most of the race. However, this lead narrowed significantly in the final month of the campaign, when Sestak concentrated his funds and efforts on television commercials questioning Specter's Democratic credentials. Specter grew more critical of Sestak as the race progressed, attacking his House attendance record, accusing him of failing to pay his staffers minimum wage and alleging he was demoted while serving in the U.S. Navy for creating a poor command climate. Political observers said Sestak's commercials played a major part in his victory in the primary election. A national swing in momentum toward Republicans and against incumbents ultimately harmed Specter's chances. As of 2026, it is the last time where an incumbent Democratic senator lost renomination in a primary.

== Background ==
=== Chris Matthews speculation ===
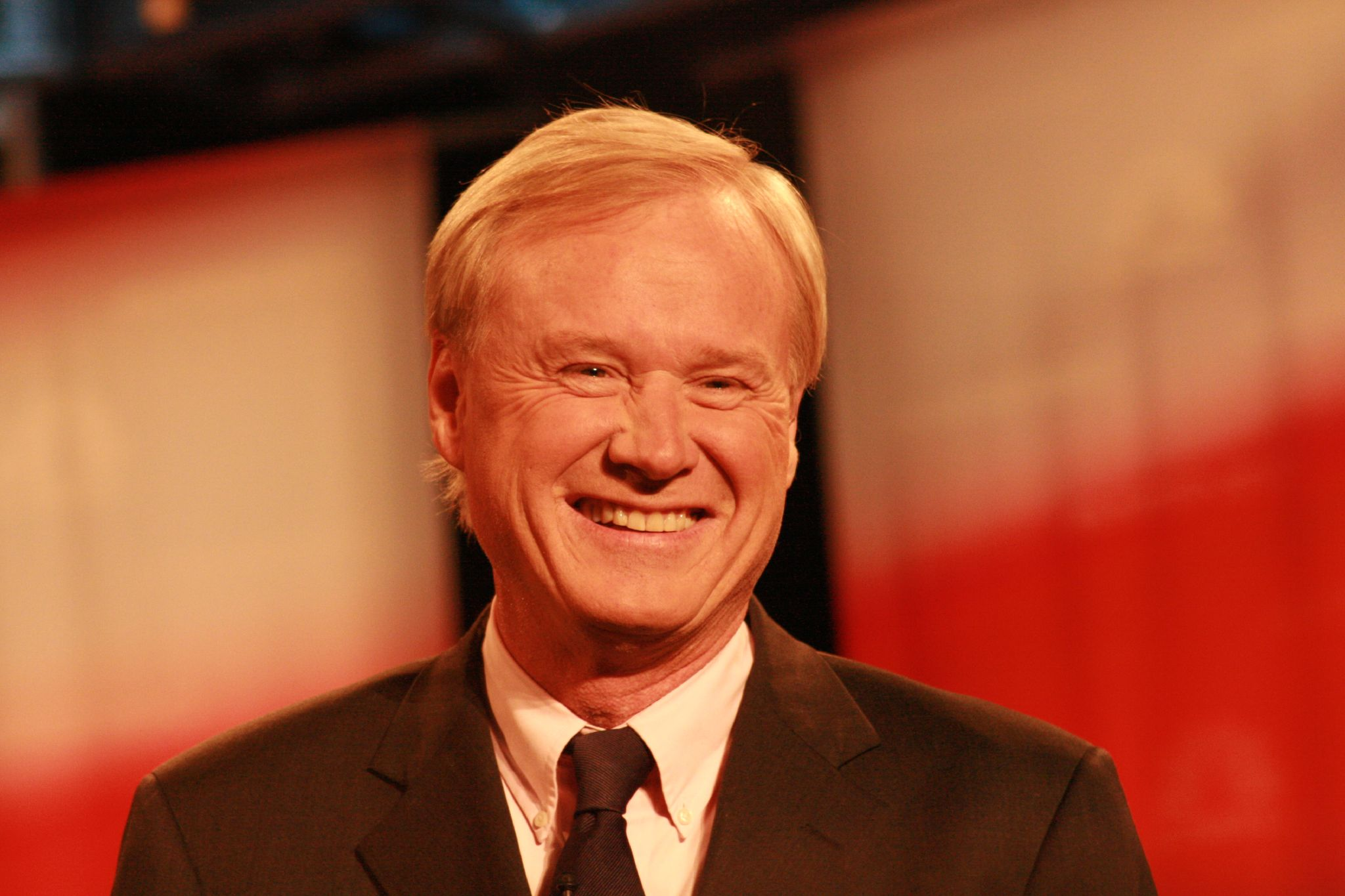
Media reports indicated Chris Matthews, news commentator with MSNBC, was considering running in the Democratic primary.

Beginning in April 2008, the media reported growing speculation that Chris Matthews, news commentator and host of MSNBC's Hardball with Chris Matthews, might run in the 2010 Democratic primary for the United States Senate Pennsylvania seat then occupied by Republican Arlen Specter. In an interview with The New York Times Magazine, Matthews said that he believed Specter had been in the Senate for too long, but that running for Senate would mean giving up a career he loved. Mark Leibovich, author of the article, wrote, "Matthews has been particularly obsessed with Pennsylvania of late, devoting hours on and off the air to the state's upcoming Democratic primary, staying in close contact with the state's party apparatus". Speculation was further fueled by Matthews' appearance on an April 14 episode of The Colbert Report. Host Stephen Colbert asked Matthews about the rumors and prodded him to make a public announcement, to which Matthews replied, "Did you ever want to be something your whole life? ... When you grow up, some kids want to be a fireman. I want to be a Senator. But I have to deal with these things as they come." Matthews declined to directly answer questions about his possible candidacy when pressed by the media, but did not deny the possibility.

The subject of Matthews' possible candidacy was raised at an October dinner fundraiser for presidential candidate Barack Obama held by Robert Wolf, president of UBS's investment bank. Discussing the dinner later, Matthews told The New York Times, "People have asked me about it. I've never told anyone that I'm running." On November 28, The Patriot-News of Harrisburg reported that Matthews met that week with Pennsylvania Democratic Party Chairman T.J. Rooney and Executive Director Mary Isenhour to discuss possibly running against Specter. Isenhour told the paper Matthews had not formed a campaign committee or begun raising money, and she did not believe he had yet come to a firm decision, adding, "He's got a really good job with MSNBC. I think he's going to put some thought into it before he jumps in." The same day, the political blog FiveThirtyEight.com reported that Matthews had already met with potential campaign staff, something Matthews claimed was "absolutely not true".

The increased speculation led some, like former spokesman for Hillary Clinton's 2008 presidential campaign Phil Singer, to criticize Matthews for openly weighing a political campaign bid while working as a news broadcaster. Singer believed Matthews should resign or be suspended from the network until a decision was made. Speculation grew as Matthews spent much of 2008 attending meetings with Pennsylvania representatives and major Democratic fundraisers. Matthews discussed a possible campaign with Pennsylvania Governor Ed Rendell, and poll numbers for a theoretical race showed him only three percentage points behind Specter. However, the speculation came to an end on January 7, 2009, when Matthews told his Hardball staff he was not going to run for Senate. Such media outlets as The New York Times and The Washington Post suggested Matthews' alleged consideration was a tactic to ensure a higher salary during negotiations with MSNBC to renew his contract, which was set to expire in June 2009.

=== Arlen Specter party switch ===
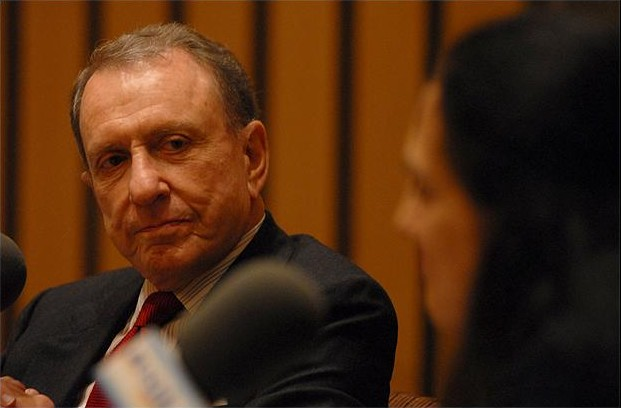
Long-time Republican Senator Arlen Specter switched to the Democratic Party, in part because he believed he was unlikely to win the Republican primary.

As early as 2008, five-term Republican Pennsylvania Senator Arlen Specter had made clear his plans to seek re-election. Specter had narrowly avoided a primary defeat against conservative challenger Pat Toomey during his 2004 Senate race, and he was expected to face an even greater challenge from Toomey in 2010, particularly since the conservative faction of the Pennsylvania Republican Party had vowed to defeat Specter in the upcoming primary. Some high-profile Democrats, including Vice President Joe Biden and Governor Rendell, began encouraging Specter to join the Democratic Party by publicly offering to help Specter raise money if he switched. A March 2009 Quinnipiac University Polling Institute poll found Specter trailing Toomey 41 percent to 27 percent among Republican primary voters, in large part due to voter angst over Specter's support for the American Recovery and Reinvestment Act of 2009, which was supported by President Obama. Since the Pennsylvania primaries are closed, the poll noted that Specter could not be assisted by support from moderates or Democrats. Clay F. Richards, assistant director of the Quinnipiac University Polling Institute, said of the poll results, "Pennsylvania Republicans are so unhappy with Sen. Specter’s vote for President Barack Obama's Stimulus Package and so-called pork barrel spending that they are voting for a former Congressman they hardly know."

A March 2009 article in The Hill quoted Specter as stating he was considering leaving the Republican party to run for re-election as an Independent candidate. Specter later denied the validity of those claims, announcing on March 18, "To eliminate any doubt, I am a Republican, and I am running for reelection in 2010 as a Republican on the Republican ticket." However, on April 28, 2009, Specter announced he was leaving the Republican Party and becoming a Democrat because he disagreed with the increasingly conservative direction the Republican Party was heading in and found his personal philosophy was now better aligned with the Democrats. Although Specter said that he primarily based his decision on principle, he also admitted it was partially due to his poor chances at winning the Republican primary: "I have traveled the state and surveyed the sentiments of the Republican Party in Pennsylvania and public opinion polls, observed other public opinion polls and have found that the prospects for winning a Republican primary are bleak."

Prior to switching parties, Specter said he had been assured by Senate Majority Leader Harry Reid that he would keep his seniority on the Senate if he joined the Democratic Party. The arrangement displeased some Senate Democrats, and, on May 3, the Senate voted to strip him of his seniority in spite of this. This temporarily made Specter the most junior Democrat in the Senate and severely limited his influence as a legislator. Nevertheless, Specter's decision was praised by many major Democrats, including Reid and President Barack Obama, who promised to campaign for him. Republicans, however, criticized the decision, accusing Specter of betraying his principles and party to preserve his political career. Michael Steele, chairman of the Republican National Committee, said Specter "flipped the bird" to the party and that Specter made the decision based solely because he knew he would lose the election. Senator John Cornyn, chairman of the National Republican Senatorial Committee and a past supporter of Specter, said the decision "represents the height of political self-preservation". Specter defended his position by arguing the Republican Party had strayed too far from the vision of President Ronald Reagan, adding, "I am not prepared to have my 29-year record in the United States Senate decided by the Pennsylvania Republican primary electorate."

=== Joe Sestak declares candidacy ===
Second-term U.S. Representative Joe Sestak, a former U.S. Navy admiral, began privately discussing the possibility of seeking the Democratic nomination with his family in December 2008. Senator Bob Menendez, chairman of the Democratic Senatorial Campaign Committee, approached Sestak in April 2009 and asked him to run, but Sestak claimed he was not initially interested. Nevertheless, media speculation about Sestak's possible campaign began as early as mid-April 2009, and intensified the day Specter changed political parties. While most Democrats embraced the long-time Senator, Sestak issued a statement criticizing Specter's decision, declaring it an opportunist move that should have been made in consultation with Pennsylvanians rather than the Senate Democratic leadership and the Washington political establishment. Menendez approached Sestak again, this time asking him not to run against Specter, but Sestak did not agree to back down. Later, when asked by Fox News, Sestak insisted he had not decided whether he would run for the office, but declined to immediately endorse Specter and said he had to "wait and see". During a May 3 appearance on CNN's State of the Union with John King, Sestak questioned whether Specter was really a genuine Democrat, adding, "I think Arlen has to tell us not that it was too hard to run against someone. ... What I need to know is, what is he running for?"

I am running to be Pennsylvania's next United States Senator because I am committed to passing along a better world to our children. That's going to take leadership that is committed to the principles of honesty, accountability, and hard work. The people we sent to Washington to represent you, to look out for you, failed to do so, and they must be held accountable.

— Joe Sestak, announcing his candidacy

Sestak insisted he would not make a final decision for several months. On May 4, he met with Andy Stern, president of the Service Employees International Union, which fueled speculation that he was seeking labor support for a campaign. Meanwhile, Joe Torsella, the former president of the National Constitution Center, had planned on running for the Democratic nomination and initially announced Specter's party change would not affect his decision to run. However, Torsella announced on May 14 he was dropping out of the race because Specter's decision changed the political landscape, and he wanted to avoid a campaign that "would probably be negative, personal, and more about Senator Specter's past than our common future". It had been reported that Governor Rendell, for whom Torsella previously worked as an aide, pushed for Torsella to step aside so Specter could run unopposed, but Torsella's staff denied those claims. Despite Torsella's departure, Sestak continued to consider entering the race and began gaining support from the Democratic party's more liberal factions like the Progressive Change Campaign Committee, which began a "Draft Sestak" campaign fund. Sestak became further encouraged to run after taking a tour of all 67 Pennsylvania counties to meet with party leaders and discuss such issues as jobs, the economy and health care. Sestak said that the leaders voiced serious concerns to him about the direction of the country and, although his lack of name recognition was a problem, Sestak said many of the people he encountered voiced support for him.

On May 27, the website Talking Points Memo posted a handwritten letter by Sestak to candidates declaring his intent to run for Senate. Sestak did not dispute the authenticity of the letter, but told the press he wanted to discuss the matter with his family before making a formal decision. Sestak told media outlets he realized President Obama wished him not to run against Specter, but that he felt the choice should be with the voters of Pennsylvania rather than the president. Governor Rendell overtly tried to convince him not to run, believing it would damage Sestak's own political future, plus cost the Democratic Party both Sestak's House seat and possibly damage Specter's general election chances. Nevertheless, Sestak formally declared his candidacy for the Democratic nomination on August 4, 2009, in a speech before a Veterans of Foreign Wars hall in his native Delaware County. Shortly after the announcement, Toomey issued a statement welcoming Sestak to the race, describing him as "a consistent liberal who really believes in his values", as compared to Specter, who he called "a career political opportunist who believes in nothing but his own re-election".

== Candidates ==
- Joe Sestak, U.S. representative for Pennsylvania's 7th congressional district
- Arlen Specter, incumbent U.S. Senator

Pennsylvania Rep. William C. Kortz and retired manufacturer Joseph Vodvarka also ran in the Democratic primary, but neither remained for the duration of the race. Kortz, who was little known outside the western Pennsylvania area, dropped out of the race on January 14, 2010, after raising only $20,000 of the $2 million he sought to raise for his campaign. Vodvarka, an Allegheny County man who had been mostly overlooked throughout the race, was formally removed from the ballot in mid-April 2010 after it was revealed he failed to garner the minimum number of signatures for a nominating petition.

== Campaign ==
=== Early months ===
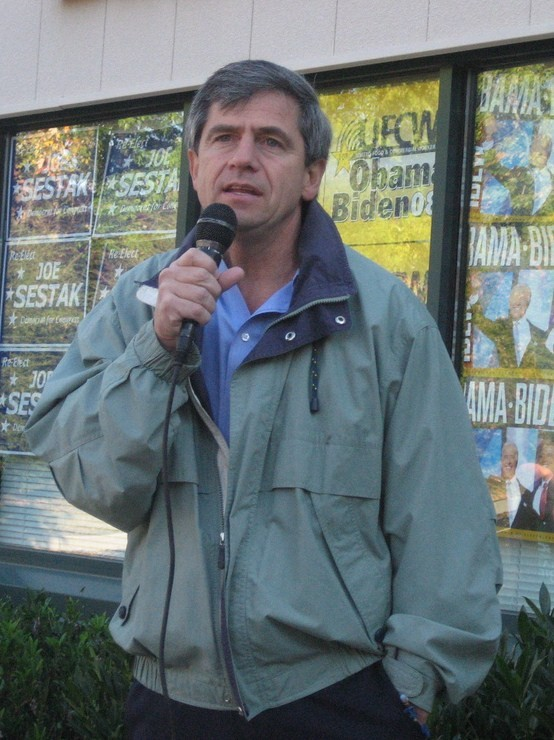
Sestak at a campaign event for Barack Obama in October 2008

Both candidates started the campaign well-funded. Sestak had more than $3 million available from his House fund to use toward starting a Senate campaign, and raised an additional $1 million by June 30, 2009, which brought his total to about $4.2 million. Sestak called it the largest campaign war-chest of any Senate challenger. Specter, however, was ahead with $6.7 million in campaign funding as of March 31. Sestak also faced challenges arising from his low name recognition and Specter's support among high-profile members of the Democratic establishment, like Obama and Biden. Specter spent the early months of his campaign trying to reestablish and strengthen his Democratic credentials, seeking union support and making speeches highlighting his support of positions supported by the party, such as the economic stimulus package, reforming health care, increasing the minimum wage, protecting abortion rights and supporting stem cell research. In a June 2009 speech to Pennsylvania Democratic Committee members in Pittsburgh, Specter said, "I'm again a Democrat and I'm pleased and proud to be a Democrat." Commentators observed that Sestak's involvement in the race would test Specter's loyalty to the Democratic party and likely force him to make more liberal votes in the Senate.

Even before Sestak formally declared his candidacy on August 4, 2009, Specter and Sestak began exchanging criticisms about each other that were so heated, The New York Times writer Janie Lorber suggested: "the contest will become one of the more vicious for next year's midterm elections." Sestak repeatedly said Specter was not a "real Democrat" and continued to assert Specter's switch was based on self-preservation rather than principles. Specter called Sestak a "flagrant hypocrite" for questioning Specter's loyalty to the Democratic Party, citing the fact that Sestak himself was registered as an Independent until he became a Democrat in 2006, just before he ran for Congress. Sestak claimed that was because he was serving in the military and wished to be nonpartisan. However, Specter called that a "lame excuse for avoiding party affiliation ... undercut by his documented disinterest in the political process", pointing out that records indicated Sestak voted in only 12 out of 35 elections from 1971 to 2005. A day after Sestak formally entered the race, Specter described Sestak's recent 67-county tour as a "taxpayer-financed self-promotion tour around the state". Specter's campaign also accused Sestak of neglecting his duties in the House and missing more than 100 votes in the last year, which Specter called the worst attendance record for any Pennsylvania Congressman. Sestak responded to the latter point that most of the missed votes were procedural in nature, and were missed because of the statewide tour and because he visited his father, who was dying at the time. Sestak accused Specter of launching a "GOP negative style campaign", which Specter denied.

=== Toomey and Obama get involved ===
External videos
- Discussion with Specter and Sestak at the Netroots Nation conference, August 14, 2009, C-SPAN

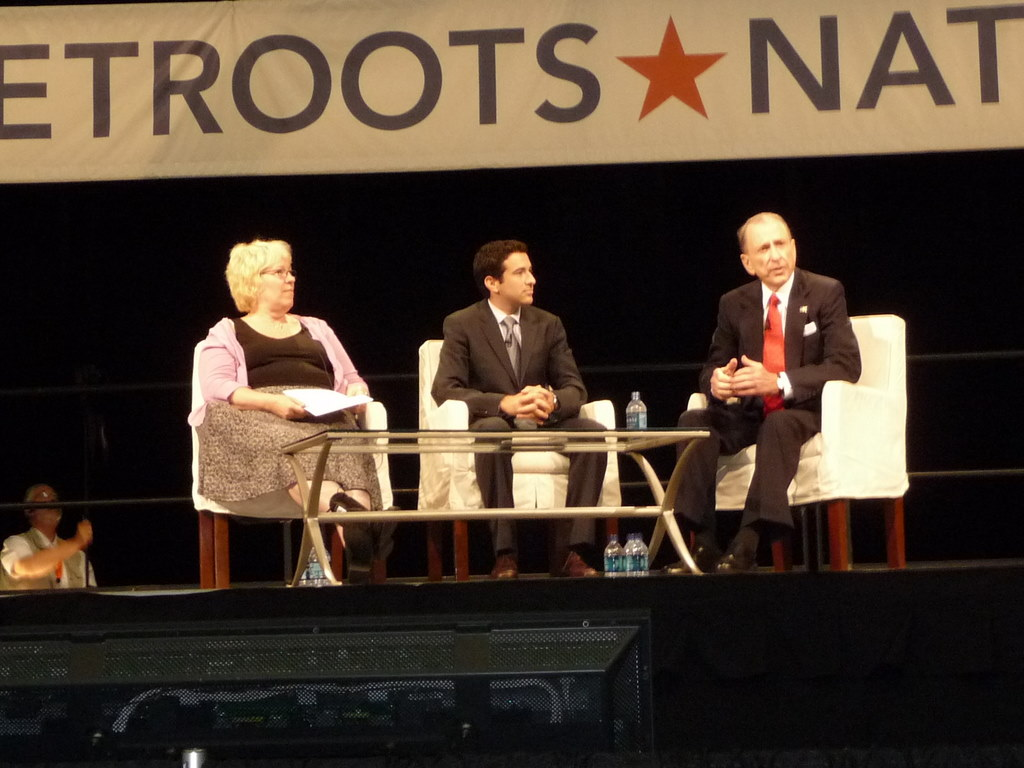
Specter (far right) at the 2009 Netroots Nation convention in Pittsburgh

Specter and Sestak participated in an August 14 panel discussion hosted by Netroots Nation, which included questions from online viewers consisting mainly of liberal and progressive bloggers and advocates. Media reports suggested Specter faced tougher questions from the crowd, with many questioning whether they could trust him based on his switching parties. Specter dismissed suggestions that his recent Democratic votes were politically motivated by the primary, and cited his support of the Lilly Ledbetter Fair Pay Act and Children's Health Insurance Reauthorization Act as proof of his Democratic credentials. Sestak argued that a change in leadership was necessary and that his military background as a United States Navy admiral gave him the necessary experience. Sestak also pointed out that Specter worked with former Senator Bob Dole to defeat President Bill Clinton's health care plan in 1993. When some in the crowd brought up how Senator Chuck Grassley, a past ally of Specter's, was arguing that Obama's health care plan would lead to "death panels," Specter said that Grassley was wrong and that he would call him about the matter. When some in the crowd chanted, "Call him now!", Specter took several audience members backstage and left a phone message for Grassley as they watched. Salon.com said based on the stunt, "Specter may have won the day, if not the battle". However, a straw poll of 250 online activists attending the event showed Sestak was preferred to Specter by a vote of 46 percent to 10 percent.

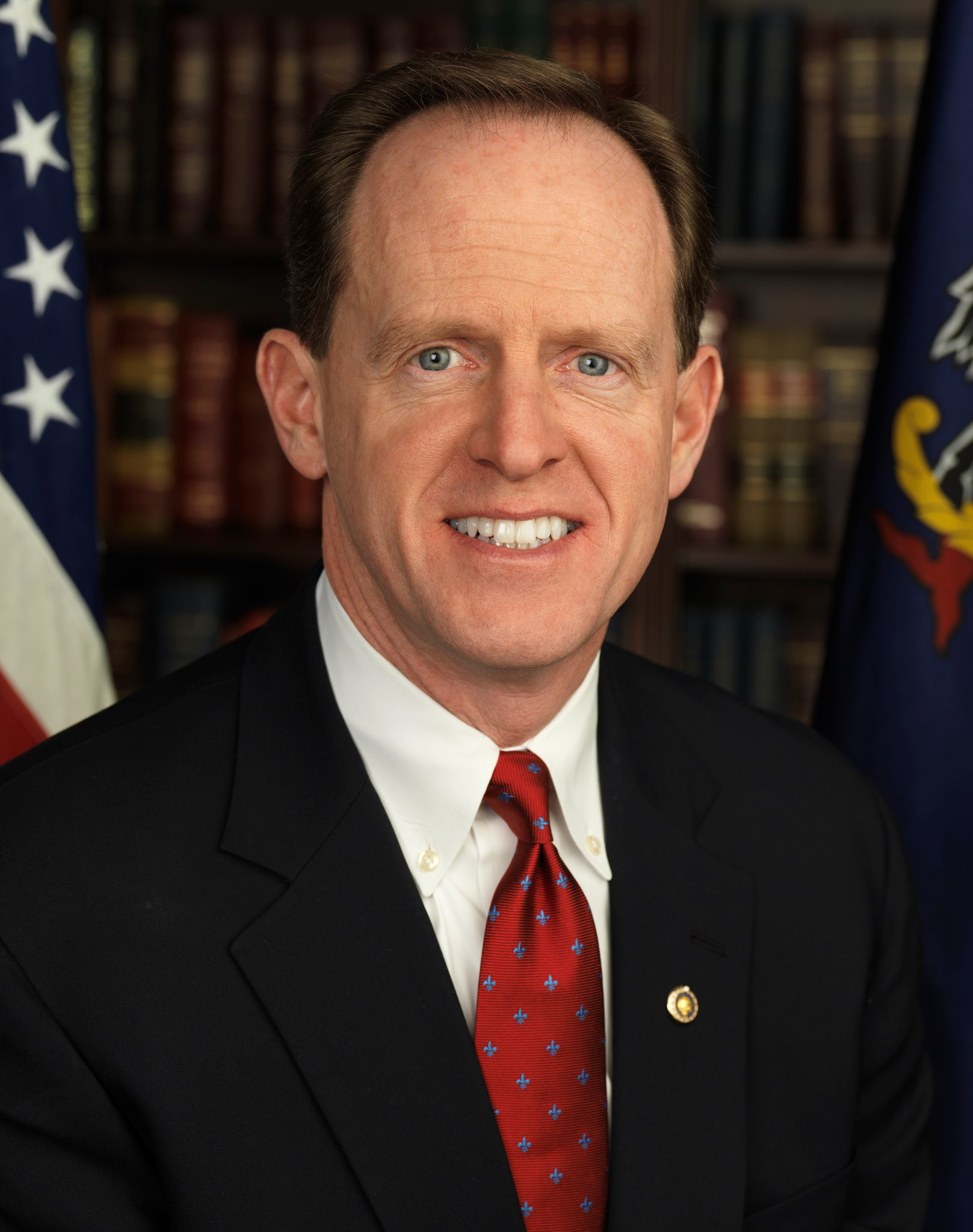
Pat Toomey, the expected Republican challenger in the Senate race, held an unorthodox joint town hall meeting with Sestak with the hopes of weakening Specter.

Later, following an e-mail exchange with the expected Republican challenger Toomey about health care, Sestak proposed an unorthodox joint town hall with Toomey about the issue, which was held September 2 at Muhlenberg College in Allentown. Specter was not invited to participate, and political pollster G. Terry Madonna of Franklin & Marshall College described it as an "informal pact" between Sestak and Toomey to weaken their joint rival, something the two men denied. Commentators suggested Toomey was willing to help Sestak at this stage of the race because he preferred Sestak as a general election opponent over Specter, who could possibly draw Republican and Independent voters from Toomey. Also in September, Obama appeared in a 30-second television ad for Specter, praising him for his support of the President's economic recovery initiatives. A September poll by Franklin & Marshall College found Specter maintained a 37 percent to 11 percent lead over Sestak, but also that 54 percent of people felt a change was needed as opposed to 34 percent who felt Specter deserved a sixth term. That poll also found 73 percent felt they did not know enough about Sestak to form an opinion, which pollster Madonna said indicated the race would be focused more on Specter's incumbency and record than about Sestak or Toomey.

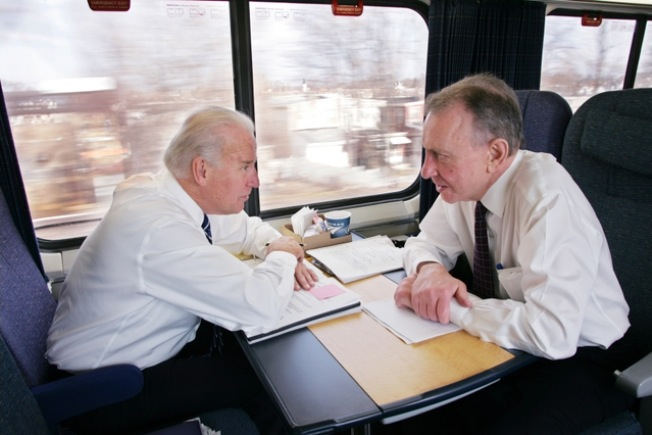
Vice President Joe Biden with Senator Arlen Specter in 2009. Biden and President Barack Obama strongly supported Specter during the primary campaign.

On September 15, Obama attended a Philadelphia fundraising dinner for Specter, an unusually public declaration of support so early in the primary season, when the President has the option of remaining neutral until the outcome becomes clearer. Governor Rendell said that Obama and Biden felt obligated to strongly support Specter because they so strongly lobbied him to switch parties. Philadelphia Mayor Michael Nutter and radio personality Michael Smerconish also spoke on Specter's behalf. Senate Majority Leader Reid took the unusual steps of scheduling no Senate votes that day so both Specter and Pennsylvania Senator Bob Casey, Jr. could attend the fundraiser. That move drew criticism from Republicans, as well as from Sestak, who felt Specter was skirting his Senate responsibilities, yet hypocritically criticizing Sestak at the same time for missing more than 100 votes in the U.S. House. The event was expected to raise about $2.5 million, which was to be split between Specter's campaign and the Democratic Senatorial Campaign Committee. After the fundraiser, Obama and Specter traveled via Air Force One to Pittsburgh to address labor activists at the AFL–CIO convention. There, Specter assured the audience he would support the Employee Free Choice Act, a proposed bill that would make union formation easier, which Specter had previously opposed as a Republican.

=== Specter maintains lead ===
As the primary entered into October, Specter continued to criticize Sestak on his record of missed votes in Congress. He claimed Sestak missed 122 in the past year, or nearly 17 percent of his total votes, whereas Specter missed four. In a letter, Specter told Sestak he should drop out of the campaign and start voting on a more consistent basis, or resign from the House "so he can cease to be a burden to the taxpayers". Around the same time, Sestak launched a website called "The Real Specter", which highlighted the right-leaning votes Specter made and alliances he held during his 29 years as a Republican in the senate. Specter continued to maintain a significant lead against Sestak of 19 percentage points, according to a Quinnipiac University poll released that month. But Sestak pointed out that the gap was 32 points in July, and cited the poll as proof that he was gaining ground in the race. Also that month, new reports indicated Toomey was growing in popularity and, in one poll, was actually ahead of Specter, with 43 percent of respondents saying they would vote for him compared to 42 percent for Specter. This was attributed by some to the challenge presented by Sestak and the declining popularity of Obama, whose approval rating had dropped from 56 percent in July to 49 percent in October.

On October 14, Specter reported he had raised $1.8 million during the previous three-month period, bringing his total to about $8.7 million. The Senator said that he was aided in large part by his September 15 fundraiser hosted by Obama. In that same period, Sestak raised only $758,000, about a quarter million dollars lower than the previous quarter, making his total allocation about $4.7 million. Sestak continued working hard to overcome his name recognition problem, seldom turning down interview requests and asking his staff to work six 12-hour days a week. As a result, Sestak saw a large amount of turnover in his staff, going through nearly half a dozen press secretaries and several chiefs of staff. Sestak called on Specter to participate in six debates, one for each media market in Pennsylvania, but Specter only agreed to participate in one because that was the amount of debates he participated in as a Republican. On December 7, Sestak was endorsed by Congressman Barney Frank, who said that he was impressed by Sestak's leadership on economic and military issues, as well as his positions against the military's "don't ask, don't tell" policy and the Defense of Marriage Act. The endorsement was important to Sestak because it was the first time a prominent member of Congress broke with the Democratic establishment to back him over Specter. Frank also said of Specter's switching parties, "I have to say I don't think it did our profession any good for someone to announce that he switched parties purely so he could survive."

New polls in January indicated voter support was growing for Toomey, who now held a projected nine percentage point lead over Specter and an eight-point lead over Sestak. Specter continued to lead against Sestak in the Democratic primary poll, this time by a 21-point margin. Some political scientists believed Toomey's gain over Specter could be attributed to voter distrust of establishment candidates and growing dissatisfaction with the health care proposal pending in Congress. However, some Democratic leaders felt Sestak's challenge to Specter was having a detrimental effect not only to Specter but to the Democratic party in general and their prospects for ultimately winning the general election. This feeling was enhanced by the growing national support for the Republican party, and especially by the unexpected victory of the Tea Party-backed Republican Scott Brown in a special election for a traditionally Democratic Massachusetts Senate seat. Specter acknowledged to The New York Times that the national political mood might work against him in the primary, but insisted he was not discouraged and expressed confidence in his ability to survive.

=== Race grows more heated ===
The primary continued to grow more heated in February 2010. On February 5, the two candidates held their first face-to-face debate, and used the 30-minute forum to strongly criticize each other, with Sestak continuing to associate Specter with failed Republican policies and Specter arguing his opponent was more focused on criticizing him than debating policy. Sestak continued to attack Specter for switching parties, asking, "Is the best the Democrats can do someone who has been on the other side, with respect, for 50 years, and cast 2,000 votes with President Bush?" Likewise, Specter once again criticized Sestak's missed votes in Congress, which he said would have been enough to earn Sestak a court-martial for going AWOL in his former Naval career. Sestak also criticized Specter for voting in favor of the Iraq War, and Specter in turn condemned Sestak for supporting Obama's proposed troop increase for the War in Afghanistan, which Specter opposed. The next day, the Pennsylvania Democratic Committee voted to endorse Specter over Sestak, with 77 percent of voters supporting the incumbent Senator, or 229 votes compared to Sestak's 72. Sestak criticized the committee for its decision, but also argued it solidified his own position as a political outsider independent from the mainstream Washington establishment. Media outlets said the vote indicated Specter had convinced most important figures in the state party that he was not simply a crossover politician.

Later in February, Specter accused Sestak of mistreating his employees and disobeying state and federal minimum wage laws by severely underpaying his House staff. Citing Federal Election Commission reports, Specter claimed ten of Sestak's sixteen campaign staffers were making less than minimum wage and that they were so underpaid they were eligible for food stamps. He also noted that Sestak's three highest-paid staffers were members of his family, including his brother Richard Sestak, who worked as campaign manager. T.J. Rooney, a Specter supporter, wrote a letter to Sestak expressing concern about the potential violation of minimum wage laws, which read: "It is inconceivable to me that our standard bearer wouldn’t be paying his workers the minimum wage". Sestak responded by acknowledging his staff could make more money elsewhere, but said "they choose to work hard and make some sacrifices because they know how important it is to elect someone to the United States Senate who shares their principles".

=== Specter maintains momentum ===
As the primary race entered into March, Specter appeared to be maintaining his momentum, with polls indicating he not only led Sestak by 24 percentage points but had recaptured a projected lead against Toomey in the general election by a margin of 49 to 42 percent. Pollsters indicated Specter was still benefiting greatly from his strong name recognition, whereas Sestak and Toomey remained relatively little-known. Peter Brown, assistant director of the Quinnipiac University Polling Institute, said, "There remains no evidence that his primary challenger, Congressman Joe Sestak, has made much progress as we get within three months of the May primary." However, Time writer Karen Tumulty noted that while "thus far, Sestak has failed to meet expectations", the poll also indicated some weaknesses for Specter. Namely, more than half of the surveyed Pennsylvanians did not feel he deserved another term. Among Democrats who knew the candidates well enough to form an opinion of both, Sestak led Specter 54 percent to 37 percent. On March 16, Governor Rendell restated his past support of Specter and said of Sestak, "He has, in my mind, no chance to win."

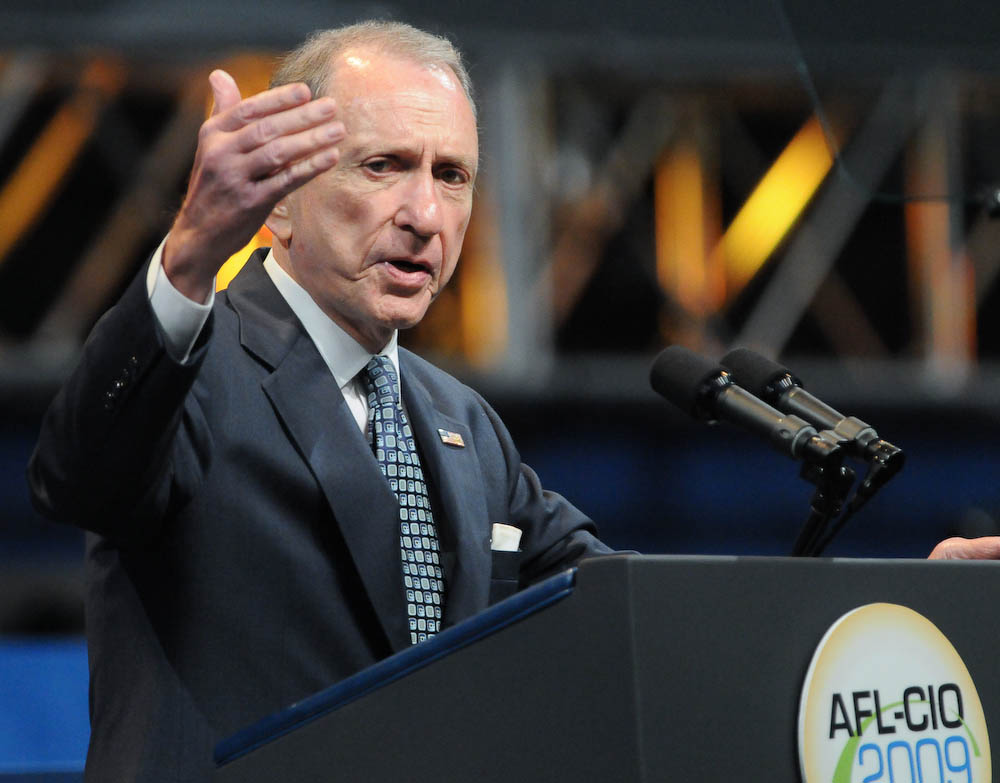
Arlen Specter speaking before the AFL–CIO, which endorsed him on March 30, 2010

On March 30, Specter won the backing of the AFL–CIO, which was considered one of the most important endorsements in the primary race. It was one of several major labor endorsements Specter had received, including the state Service Employees International Union and the Pennsylvania State Education Association, which represented 200,000 state teachers. Representatives from the AFL–CIO cited Specter's backing of President Obama's stimulus package as a major factor in their decision. Sestak criticized the union federation's decision, pointing out he had a 100 percent rating from the national AFL–CIO. In comparison, Specter had a 61 percent rating. He also attacked Specter for previously backing President George W. Bush's economic policies and said, "Pennsylvania workers need a Senator they can count on to be there when they need him, not only when he needs them during an election." The Philadelphia Inquirer writer Thomas Fitzgerald called the endorsement "a powerful affirmation of how smoothly Specter has managed his political transition to the Democratic Party since leaving the Republican Party less than a year ago."

On April 11, Sestak held a debate with Toomey in Philadelphia without Specter present. Media observers described it as an explicit criticism of Specter for refusing to hold more than one debate with Sestak. During that debate, Sestak strongly attacked Toomey's voting record in what The Morning Call reporter Colby Itkowitz described as "an obvious effort to show Democrats that he could hold his own in a general election matchup." At the end of the debate, Toomey voiced respect for Sestak and described him as a more principled man than Specter, whom he criticized for not participating in more debates. Later that month, when the Senate candidates publicly released their quarterly campaign finance reports on April 15, it was revealed Toomey raised more in the first three months of 2010 than either Democratic candidate, adding $2.3 million to his total $4.1 million war chest compared to Specter adding $1.1 million to his total $9.1 million fund. Political analysts attributed this to the national swing in momentum toward Republicans, and said that it could indicate the Republicans would be victorious in many Senate races, including in Pennsylvania. Sestak raised $442,000 in the three-month period, down from his previous quarter, which Specter's campaign said proved Democratic donors had rejected his candidacy. Specter's fundraising advantage was significant because it allowed him to start early in running political campaign commercials.

=== Television advertisements ===
Starting in April, both Specter and Sestak launched television advertisements that were particularly critical of each other. Sestak, who had been saving most of his roughly $5 million campaign funds until the final month of the primary race, unveiled a 60-second spot that highlighted his Navy career and described the role his daughter's experience as a brain cancer survivor played in his decision to enter politics. The commercial did not discuss Specter by name but made several implicit references to him, such as Sestak's statements that "too many politicians are concerned about keeping their jobs instead of helping people" and "if we want real change in Washington, we can't keep sending the same career politicians to represent us". Specter launched several commercials, most focusing on his plans to promote job growth. One advertisement, however, focused entirely on attacking Sestak, highlighting not only his voting attendance record – labeling him "No Show Joe" – but also his Navy service. The commercial stated Sestak was "relieved of duty in the Navy for creating a poor command climate," a reference to Sestak's 2005 transfer from a senior Pentagon planning post to a lesser position, which effectively ended his naval career.

The Navy Times had previously reported the transfer resulted from Sestak forcing subordinates to work unreasonable hours. However, Sestak himself disputed that accusation and attributed the transfer to the fact that the new top officer, Admiral Michael Mullen, simply wanted to appoint his own team. Sestak called on Specter to stop broadcasting the commercial, accusing the Senator of "Republican-style" negative campaign tactics, which he compared to those used against Senator John Kerry by the Swift Vets and POWs for Truth during the 2004 presidential election. Sestak said in a statement, "It's time to tell Arlen Specter: Democrats don't 'swift boat'. We're better than that." A group of veterans gathered in Philadelphia to echo Sestak's call that the commercial should be removed, with retired U.S. Air Force Lieutenant General Robert E. Kelley announcing, "We're all here because we're enraged at the fact that someone, anyone, in the United States today would question someone who has 30 years of service." Specter's campaign replied they would not remove the commercial because it was accurate, and instead called on Sestak to remove his advertisement, claiming it violated United States Department of Defense guidelines because it used military images, references, and jargon without a disclaimer that the department did not endorse it.

=== Sestak gains in closing weeks ===
External videos
- Pennsylvania Democratic Primary Senate Debate, May 1, 2010, C-SPAN

Sestak and Specter held their first and only televised debate on May 1 at Philadelphia's Fox affiliate. The two candidates bitterly attacked each other's character and honesty. The two began arguing even before the hour-long debate formally began, when Sestak objected to Specter's use of notes and said that the rules did not allow them. The debate organizer ruled that the notes were allowed. Specter criticized Sestak for campaign advertisements that accused the Senator of lying about Sestak's record. Specter said, "Nobody has ever called me a liar," and demanded an apology, to which Sestak did not respond. Specter also repeatedly asked Sestak to publicly release his military records, to which Sestak again refused to respond. Sestak accused Specter of using Republican-style tactics in the vein of Karl Rove, a former adviser to George W. Bush, and said Specter's attacks were meant to mask his record of supporting Bush's failed economic policies. Specter insisted the questions raised about Sestak's naval record were legitimate because much of Sestak's campaign was based on his military background, adding, "It goes to his ability to get things done, to get along with people. He's all peaches and cream on television." Specter criticized Sestak for supporting the troop build-up in Afghanistan, while Sestak noted that Specter voted against a ban on assault weapons in the 1990s. The Philadelphia Inquirer noted the debate was "every bit as contentious as their Democratic Senate primary struggle has become in its closing days".

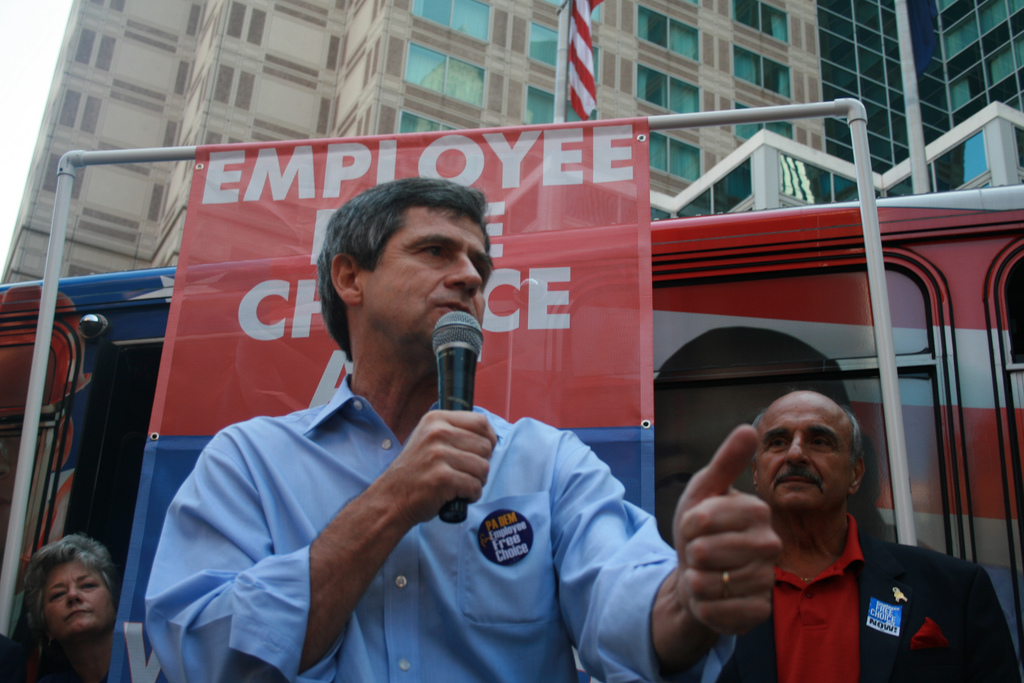
After trailing behind Arlen Specter for the entire primary campaign, Joe Sestak narrowed that lead during the final weeks of the race.

With only two weeks remaining before the primary, a Quinnipiac University poll released May 4 showed Specter's lead against Sestak had significantly narrowed, dropping from 53 to 32 percent in the previous month to 47–39 percent. A daily tracking poll by Muhlenberg College showed the race as even closer, with Specter supported by 46 percent of likely voters surveyed, and Sestak trailing only four points at 42 percent. The Quinnipiac poll indicated the strongest factor in these changes was that Sestak was gaining better name recognition due to his television commercials. According to the poll, 43 percent of respondents now had a favorable view of him, compared to only 33 percent in March. The day after the poll was released, Sestak unveiled a new television advertisement strongly critical of Specter, highlighting the incumbent Senator's Republican history and showing images of him with George W. Bush and Republican vice presidential candidate Sarah Palin. The commercial featured a clip of Specter saying, "My change in party will enable me to be reelected" and ended with a narrator saying, "Arlen Specter switched parties to save one job: his, not yours." The same week the advertisement ran, T.J. Rooney said in an interview with Politico that a Sestak primary victory would be "cataclysmic" for the party in the general election, and warned Democratic voters, "If we want to keep this seat in Democratic hands, the only person capable of delivering that victory is Arlen Specter."

Specter received several high-profile endorsements during the final weeks leading up to the primary. Senator John Kerry, who had been an early supporter of Sestak's 2006 House campaign, endorsed Specter in the Senate race, calling him "fighter and a friend, and I am proud to vouch for his character". The Philadelphia Inquirer called Sestak "a worthy opponent" and said that his determination made the race especially competitive, but ultimately embraced Specter, whose overall career record the newspaper said was "a good choice for Democrats". The Pittsburgh Post-Gazette also endorsed Specter, focusing more on the fact that Specter stood the best chance of defeating Toomey in a general election challenge. The Pittsburgh Tribune-Review, however, endorsed Sestak, calling him "incredibly intelligent, thoughtful and articular" while condemning Specter as a "self-serving political ferret" for switching parties. Actor Michael J. Fox, who has Parkinson's disease, appeared in a television advertisement for Specter, praising the Senator for his long-standing support of stem cell research. Fox said, "In the fight against disease, you can look back or move forward. Arlen Specter is moving forward." President Obama sent e-mail messages to his Organizing for America supporters encouraging them to vote for Specter, However, despite his long position of support for Specter, Obama did not fly to Pennsylvania to actively campaign for the Senator during the campaign's final days.

As the campaign entered its final week, polls showed Specter and Sestak at a dead heat, with different surveys reporting contradictory findings over which candidate maintained a slight edge. A Quinnipiac University poll found Specter leading 44–42 percent, with fourteen percent undecided. A Franklin & Marshall poll found Sestak ahead 38–36 percent, with about a quarter of voters undecided. In both cases, the lead fell within the survey's margin of error. G. Terry Madonna, director of the Franklin & Marshall poll, said that Sestak improved because his television commercials were resonating with voters on three fronts: the arguments that Specter switched parties for solely political reasons, that he consistently voted for Republican policies and that he had been in office too long.

== Polling ==
Aggregate polls

Source of poll aggregation	Dates administered	Dates updated	Arlen Specter	Joe Sestak	Other/Undecided (Note: Calculated by taking the difference of 100% and all other candidates combined.)	Margin
RealClearPolitics	May 3–16, 2010	May 16, 2010	42.0%	44.2%	13.8%	Sestak +3.0%

Poll source	Dates administered	Arlen Specter	Joe Sestak
Quinnipiac	May 16, 2010	41%	42%
Muhlenberg/Morning Call	May 16, 2010	44%	44%
Muhlenberg/Morning Call	May 15, 2010	44%	43%
Daily Kos/Research 2000	May 14, 2010	43%	45%
Muhlenberg/Morning Call	May 14, 2010	45%	43%
Suffolk	May 13, 2010	40%	49%
Muhlenberg/Morning Call	May 13, 2010	44%	44%
Franklin & Marshall	May 12, 2010	36%	38%
Quinnipiac	May 12, 2010	44%	42%
Muhlenberg/Morning Call	May 12, 2010	45%	45%
Muhlenberg/Morning Call	May 11, 2010	43%	47%
Muhlenberg/Morning Call	May 10, 2010	42%	47%
Rasmussen Reports	May 10, 2010	42%	47%
Muhlenberg/Morning Call	May 9, 2010	42%	46%
Muhlenberg/Morning Call	May 8, 2010	42%	44%
Muhlenberg/Morning Call	May 7, 2010	43%	43%
Quinnipiac	April 28 – May 2, 2010	47%	39%
Muhlenberg/Morning Call	May 2, 2010	48%	42%
Rasmussen Reports	April 13, 2010	44%	42%
Quinnipiac	March 31 – April 5, 2010	53%	32%
Rasmussen Reports	March 15, 2010	48%	37%
Quinnipiac	February 22–28, 2010	53%	29%
Rasmussen Reports	February 8, 2010	51%	36%
Rasmussen Reports	January 18, 2010	53%	32%
Quinnipiac	December 8, 2009	53%	30%
Rasmussen Reports	December 8, 2009	48%	35%
Rasmussen Reports	October 13, 2009	46%	42%
Quinnipiac	September 28, 2009	44%	25%
Rasmussen Reports	August 11, 2009	47%	34%
Quinnipiac	July 19, 2009	55%	23%
Franklin/Marshall	June 25, 2009	33%	13%
Rasmussen Reports	June 17, 2009	51%	32%
Quinnipiac	May 28, 2009	50%	21%
POS	May 3, 2009	62%	24%

== Results ==
External videos
- Primary victory speech by Sestak, Valley Forge Military Academy, May 18, 2010, C-SPAN

Democratic primary results
Party	Candidate	Votes	%
Democratic	Joe Sestak	568,563	53.8
Democratic	Arlen Specter (incumbent)	487,217	46.2
Total votes		1,055,780	100.0

Sestak won the May 18 primary with 53.8 percent of the vote, or 568,563 of the votes cast, compared to 46.2 percent and 487,217 votes for Specter. The defeat led to the end of Specter's nearly 30-year Senate career, the longest of any Pennsylvania Senator in history. Afterward, Sestak declared, "This is what democracy should look like: a win for the people over the establishment. It should come as no surprise to anyone that people want a change." Specter conceded defeat and said, "It's been a great privilege to serve the people of Pennsylvania. It's been a great privilege to be in the United States Senate." Commentators suggested Specter's defeat signaled an electorate unsatisfied with the establishment in both major parties, and indicated that the backing of prominent politicians had little effect on voters during this political age. Sestak's victory was seen as a minor embarrassment for Obama, who strongly and publicly advocated for Specter during the race. Several news outlets reflected that Sestak's television advertisements condemning Specter as a hypocrite and opportunist were especially effective and may have been the primary factor in his victory. The Washington Post said the Pennsylvania race drew more attention than any other primary election in 2010 due to Specter's longevity and his switch to the Democratic party.

Toomey went on to defeat Sestak in the general election, winning by 80,229 votes.

== Clinton job offer to Sestak ==
While the White House may think this is politics as usual, what is spectacularly unusual is when a candidate – a U.S. congressman no less – freely acknowledges such a proposal. Almost always candidates keep quiet about such deals, and for good reason – they are against the law.

— Congressman Darrell Issa

During a February 2010 television interview, Sestak said that in July 2009, he was offered a job in President Obama's administration if he dropped out of the race. During a February 18 taping of Larry Kane: Voice of Reason, a Philadelphia-area local news show, host Larry Kane asked Sestak whether such an offer had been made, to which Sestak responded, "Yes", without elaborating beyond that it was a high-ranking assignment and that he did not plan to take it. In subsequent press inquiries, Sestak repeatedly stood by his original statement. When asked about the matter by The Washington Post, he said, "There has been some indirect means in which they were trying to offer things if I got out." Likewise, during an appearance on the Fox News Channel, he said, "I was asked a direct question yesterday, and I answered it honestly. There's nothing more to go into. I'm in this race now." Over the next month, White House officials did not answer multiple press inquiries about whether Sestak's claims were true. On March 16, White House Press Secretary Robert Gibbs said he had reviewed the matter and found conversations that had been held with Sestak were "not problematic."

In March, Congressman Darrell Issa, the ranking Republican on the House Committee on Oversight and Government Reform, sent a letter to White House Counsel Robert Bauer stating if Sestak's claim was true, the Obama administration may have violated a federal statute that makes it illegal for a government employee to use his authority to interfere with a Senate election. Interest in the alleged job offer reignited after Sestak defeated Specter in the primary on May 18. Seven Republicans from the Senate Judiciary Committee wrote to Attorney General Eric Holder seeking a review of the legal implications of the offer. Around this time, Sestak continued to maintain that a job offer was made, but he downplayed the importance of the incident and defended Obama's integrity. On May 28, the White House formally responded to the allegations and acknowledged White House Chief of Staff Rahm Emanuel enlisted former President Bill Clinton to offer Sestak a seat on a presidential advisory board or another executive board if Sestak dropped his candidacy. If Sestak accepted, he would have been allowed to remain in the House while serving in the unpaid position.

Bauer said that nobody in the administration itself directly discussed the offer with Sestak, and he does not believe there was anything improper, illegal or unethical about the conduct. Republicans in Congress disagreed, arguing the action contradicted claims Obama made during his presidential campaign about ethical conduct and transparency in government. Darrell Issa, in particular, felt it was an impeachable offense and referred to it as "Obama's Watergate". Nevertheless, the matter gradually became less of a focus during the primary election, where other topics like spending and the economy took the spotlight. With Issa poised to become chairman of the House Committee on Oversight and Government Reform following the Republican Party recapturing the house during the 2010 midterm elections, it was widely expected he would launch an official investigation into the job offer based on his prior critical comments about the matter. However, on November 5, Issa announced he would not pursue an investigation. Some politicians and members of the media said that the job offer made to Sestak was neither illegal nor abhorrent, and that such deals are regularly made by politicians of all levels. Chris Cillizza of The Washington Post felt the matter only appeared to be a scandal because the White House badly mishandled the response, and Chicago Tribune writer John Kass wrote, "Offering a spot to an ambitious young politician to protect an old servile weakling isn't new. Presidents do it, governors do it. Big-city mayors really know how to do it."
