= College Cost Reduction and Access Act =

The College Cost Reduction and Access Act was introduced on June 12, 2007. The bill sponsor is Representative George Miller, a Democratic Congressman from California. George Miller served as a United States representative from California from 1975-2015. He represented the state's 7th Congressional District until 2013 when he was redistricted to the 11th Congressional District. The 7th congressional district includes most territory from Richard to Vallejo, Hercules, Martinez, Pittsburg as well as through the mountain interstices of Contra Costa County and part of Concord, Northeast of Vallejo. In the 7th Congressional District, George Miller served as the Co-Chairman of the House Natural Resource Committee from 1991 to 199. From 2007 to 2011 he served as the Chairman of the House Education and Labor Committee, giving him responsibility for shaping educational policies. George Miller represented parts of the California Bay which is home to many students and families struggling with college tuition costs. Miller had worked on earlier pieces of legislation to expand Pell Grants as well as try to improve higher education access. George Miller has previously helped college students afford their education and supported working class families.

== Legislative Insight ==
The Committee of Education and Labor had their first meeting on June 25, 2007 and at that meeting they considered the rising tuition in colleges around the United States, the hardships and burden of student loans, and federal funding options. The Committee of Education and Labor had hearings that had a range of witnesses and provided arguments for what they were for or against. This took place in the House of Representatives as George Miller, the bill sponsor, was chairman of the committee. One of the major witnesses is the Department of Education officials. They took the position of defending existing loans and granting strictures and how federal loans have been helping others throughout the United States. Although coming across strong, they questioned whether or not enough was being done to help Americans. The Government Accountability Office Representatives pointed out an inadequate finding in the current federal loan system. Student Loan Industry Executive witnesses had argued that private lenders were necessary for making higher education accessible, while strongly opposing subsidy cuts. The borrower advocacy organization advocated for students that have spoken out about the struggles of student debt. They strongly supported proposals to lower interest rates and increase Pell Grants. There were several major debates and controversies during the hearings. Some of the debate sparked by who was responsible for tuition increasing at unsustainable rates. The Pell Grants were also a controversial topic and whether the grants would be beneficial long term. Lender subsidies and repayment and forgiveness reforms are two other topics that were debated among witnesses or entities.

== Provisions of the Law ==
The College Cost Reduction and Access Act of 2007 authorized billions of dollars in new funding to raise Pell Grant awards as well as increase to the maximum grant levels through 2013. This is mentioned in Title I of the provision. There are many major provisions of the bill. Title I is a grant to students and created TEACH Grants for low income students pursuing teaching careers. Title II is about loan benefit, repayment, and conditions, as it introduced the Income-Based Repayment to cap monthly loan payments. Title III is the Federal Family Education Loan Program which reduces insurance and prohibits passing some costs to borrowers. Title IV is about loan forgiveness and it broadens opportunities for loan forgiveness for teachers, nonprofit employees, and public servants. Title V &VI are about federal Perkins loan and analysis. Title Vll is the Competitive Loan Auction Pilot Program which establishes a pilot program beginning in July 2009. Title Vlll is partnership grants and creates a College Access Challenge Grant Program to fund states to help low income students prepare and succeed in college. Between the introduction of the bill and the final enacted law, several changes were made. In the beginning, the main focus was on the Pell Grant program and student loan reductions. The final bill strengthened the repayment and forgiveness provisions. It also changed some appropriations about annual increases. The introduction text for the TEACH Grants stated that it established grants for students preparing to be teachers. The final text adds clear definitions to what is an eligible institution and reporting requirements for TEACH Grants.
