= Dolné Lovčice =

- Municipality
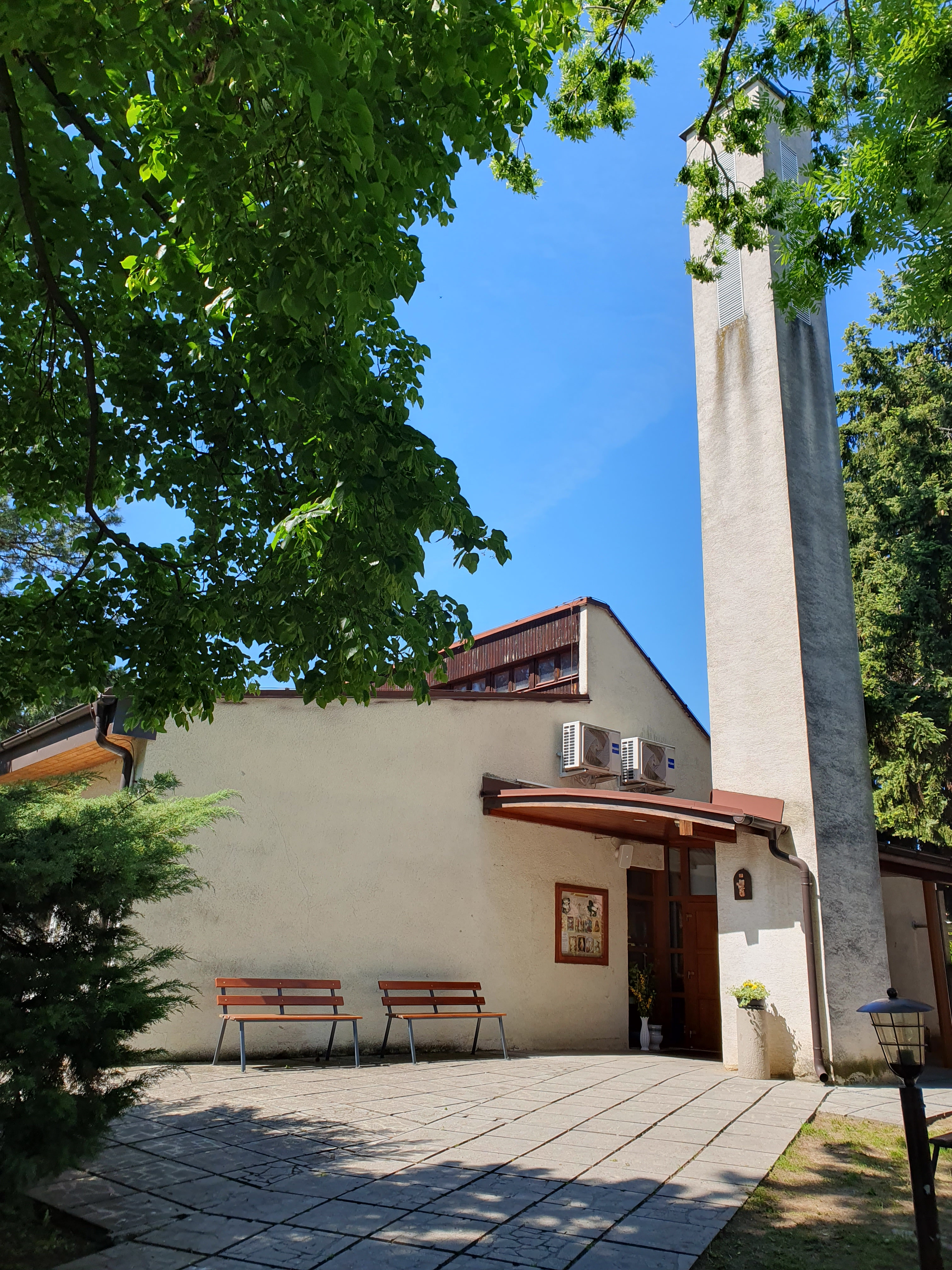

- Flag

- Location of Dolné Lovčice in the Trnava Region Location of Dolné Lovčice in Slovakia
- Coordinates: 48.37°N 17.68°E
- Country: Slovakia
- Region: Trnava Region
- District: Trnava District
- First mentioned: 1292

Area
  - Total: 5.74 km^{2} (2.22 sq mi)
- Elevation: 135 m (443 ft)

Population (2025)
  - Total: 802
- Time zone: UTC+1 (CET)
  - Summer (DST): UTC+2 (CEST)
- Postal code: 919 27
- Area code: +421 33
- Vehicle registration plate (until 2022): TT
- Website: www.obec-dolnelovcice.sk

Dolné Lovčice (Hungarian: Alsólóc) is a village and municipality of Trnava District in the Trnava region of Slovakia.

== See also ==
- List of municipalities and towns in Slovakia

== Geography ==
The municipality lies at an altitude of 135 metres (443 ft) and covers an area of 5.74 km^{2} (2.22 sq mi) (2025).

== Population ==
Population statistic (10 years)
Year	1995	2005	2015	2025
Count	711	707	750	802
Difference		−0.56%	+6.08%	+6.93%

Population statistic
Year	2024	2025
Count	809	802
Difference		−0.86%

It has a population of 802 people (31 December 2025).

=== Ethnicity ===
Census 2021 (1+ %)
Ethnicity	Number	Fraction
Slovak	774	96.75%
Not found out	21	2.62%
Total	800	

In year 2021 was 800 people by ethnicity 774 as Slovak, 21 as Not found out, 7 as Rusyn, 3 as Czech, 2 as Romani, 2 as Russian, 2 as Other, 1 as Ukrainian, 1 as Italian, 1 as German and 1 as Hungarian.

Note on population: The difference values of population numbers in the table "Population statistic" and in the sections "Ethnicity" & "Religion" is caused by the use of various statistical methods.

=== Religion ===
Census 2021 (1+ %)
Religion	Number	Fraction
Roman Catholic Church	596	74.5%
None	146	18.25%
Not found out	20	2.5%
Evangelical Church	15	1.88%
Jehovah's Witnesses	8	1%
Total	800	

In year 2021 was 800 people by religion 596 from Roman Catholic Church, 146 from None, 20 from Not found out, 15 from Evangelical Church, 8 from Jehovah's Witnesses, 7 from Greek Catholic Church, 2 from Paganism and natural spirituality, 2 from Ad hoc movements, 1 from Calvinist Church, 1 from Eastern Orthodox Church, 1 from Christian Congregations in Slovakia and 1 from Buddhism.

== Genealogical resources ==
The records for genealogical research are available at the state archive "Statny Archiv in Bratislava, Slovakia"

- Roman Catholic church records (births/marriages/deaths): 1743-1896 (parish B)
- Lutheran church records (births/marriages/deaths): 1666-1895 (parish B)
