= 2016 United States Senate election in Pennsylvania =

- November 8, 2016
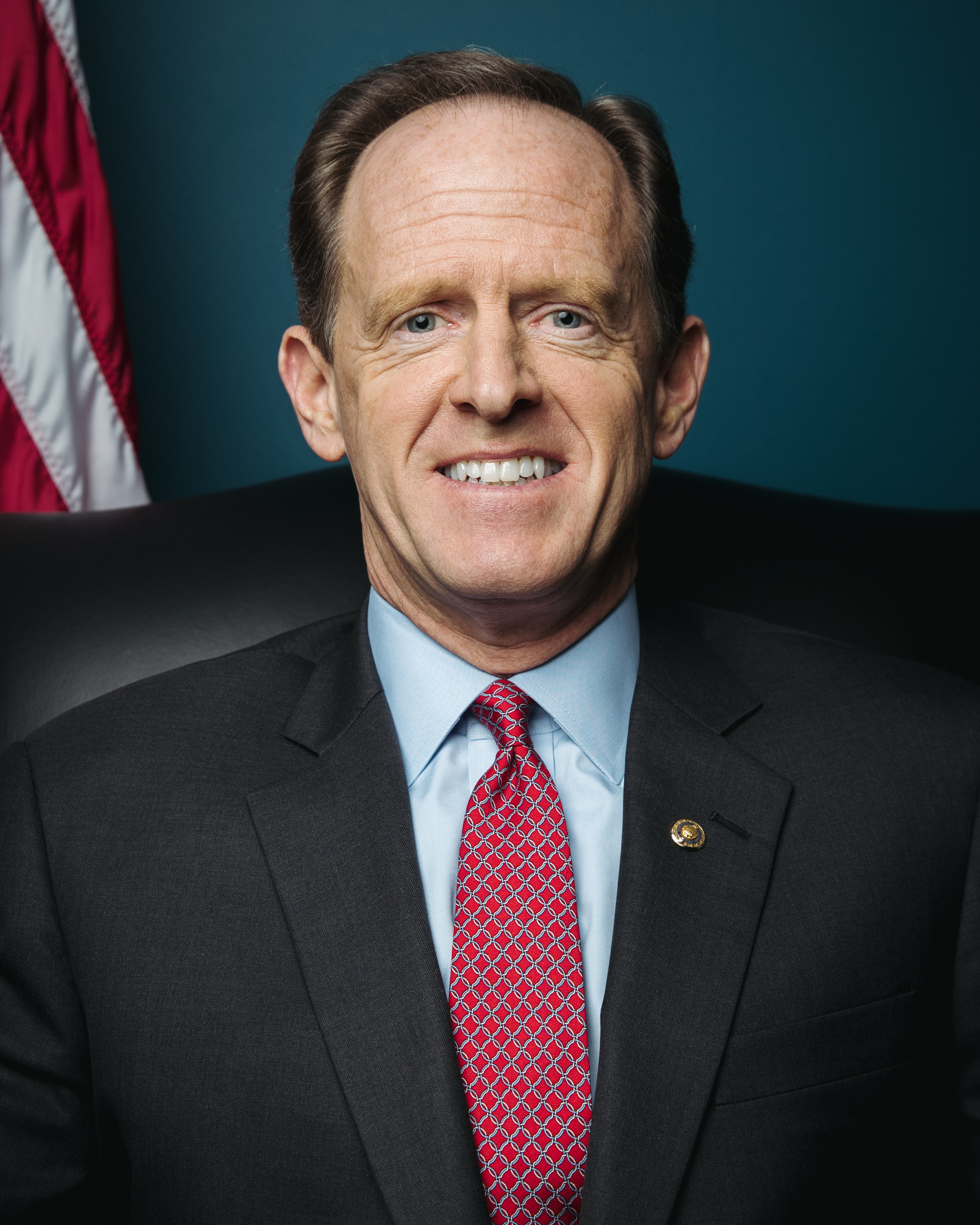

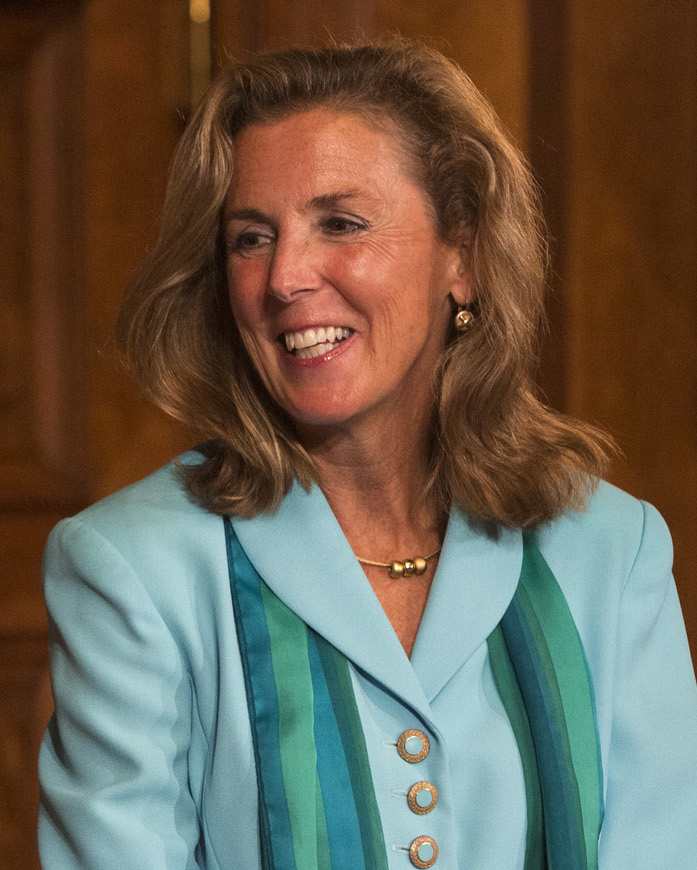
Nominee	Pat Toomey	Katie McGinty
Party	Republican	Democratic
Popular vote	2,951,702	2,865,012
Percentage	48.72%	47.29%
- Toomey: 40–50% 50–60% 60–70% 70–80% 80–90% >90% McGinty: 40–50% 50–60% 60–70% 70–80% 80–90% >90% Tie: 40–50% No votes
U.S. senator before election
Pat Toomey
Republican
Elected U.S. Senator
Pat Toomey
Republican

The 2016 United States Senate election in Pennsylvania took place on November 8, 2016, to elect a member of the United States Senate to represent the Commonwealth of Pennsylvania, concurrently with the 2016 U.S. presidential election, as well as other elections to the United States Senate in numerous other states, elections to the United States House of Representatives, and various state and local elections. The primaries were held on April 26.

Incumbent Republican U.S. Senator Pat Toomey was reelected to a second term in a close race, defeating Democratic nominee Katie McGinty and Libertarian Party nominee Edward Clifford. If McGinty had won, she would have become Pennsylvania's first female U.S. senator. With a margin of 1.43%, this election was the second-closest race of the 2016 Senate election cycle, behind only the election in New Hampshire.

As of 2025, Toomey was the last Republican U.S. senatorial candidate to win the counties of Bucks, Centre, Dauphin, and Erie; and the last Republican ever to win Chester County, which has trended Democratic in recent years.

== Background ==
Five-term senator Arlen Specter, a longtime moderate Republican, switched to the Democratic Party in April 2009, and ran for reelection in 2010 as a Democrat. He was defeated in the Democratic primary by U.S. Representative and former U.S. Navy three-star admiral Joe Sestak. After a close race, Sestak lost the general election to former U.S. Representative Pat Toomey by 51% to 49%, a margin of 80,229 votes out of almost 4 million cast. Toomey had previously run for the seat in 2004, narrowly losing to Specter in the Republican primary. Specter later died in 2012.

After the Republicans took control of the Senate following the 2014 Senate elections, the election in Pennsylvania was seen by many as a top target for the Democrats, who hoped to regain their majority. Katie McGinty, who won the Democratic primary, was one of 160 candidates endorsed by Barack Obama. McGinty got her start in politics after winning the Congressional Fellowship of the American Chemical Society, leading to a position with then Senator Al Gore. In 1993 she was appointed deputy assistant and then chair of the White House Council of Environmental Quality under Bill Clinton. She went on to be appointed head of the Pennsylvania Department of Environmental Protection by Governor Ed Rendell in 2003. McGinty faced 2010 nominee Sestask and mayor of Braddock, future lieutenant governor of Pennsylvania and holder of this Senate seat John Fetterman in the primary.

== Republican primary ==
=== Candidates ===
==== Nominee ====
- Pat Toomey, incumbent U.S. senator

=== Endorsements ===
Pat Toomey

Federal officials

- John Bolton, 25th United States Ambassador to the United Nations (2005–2006)

U.S. senators

- John Cornyn, U.S. senator from Texas (2002–present), Senate Majority Whip (2015–2019)
- Ted Cruz, U.S. senator from Texas (2013–present), candidate for president in 2016
- Joni Ernst, U.S. senator from Iowa (2015–present)
- John McCain, U.S. senator from Arizona (1987–2018), Republican nominee for president in 2008, candidate for president in 2000

U.S. representatives

- Gabby Giffords, U.S. representative from Arizona's 8th congressional district (2007–2012) (Democratic)

Mayors

- Michael Bloomberg, 108th mayor of New York City (2002–2013) and CEO of Bloomberg L.P.

Individuals

- Carly Fiorina, former CEO of Hewlett-Packard, Republican nominee for the U.S. Senate in California in 2010, candidate for president in 2016

Organizations

- Americans for Responsible Solutions
- Club for Growth
- United States Chamber of Commerce

Newspapers

- Altoona Mirror
- Bucks County Courier Times
- The Intelligencer
- The Patriot-News
- Pittsburgh Post-Gazette
- The Tribune-Democrat
- Williamsport Sun-Gazette
- York Daily Record

=== Results ===
Republican primary results
Party	Candidate	Votes	%
Republican	Pat Toomey (incumbent)	1,342,941	100.00%
Total votes		1,342,941	100.00%

== Democratic primary ==
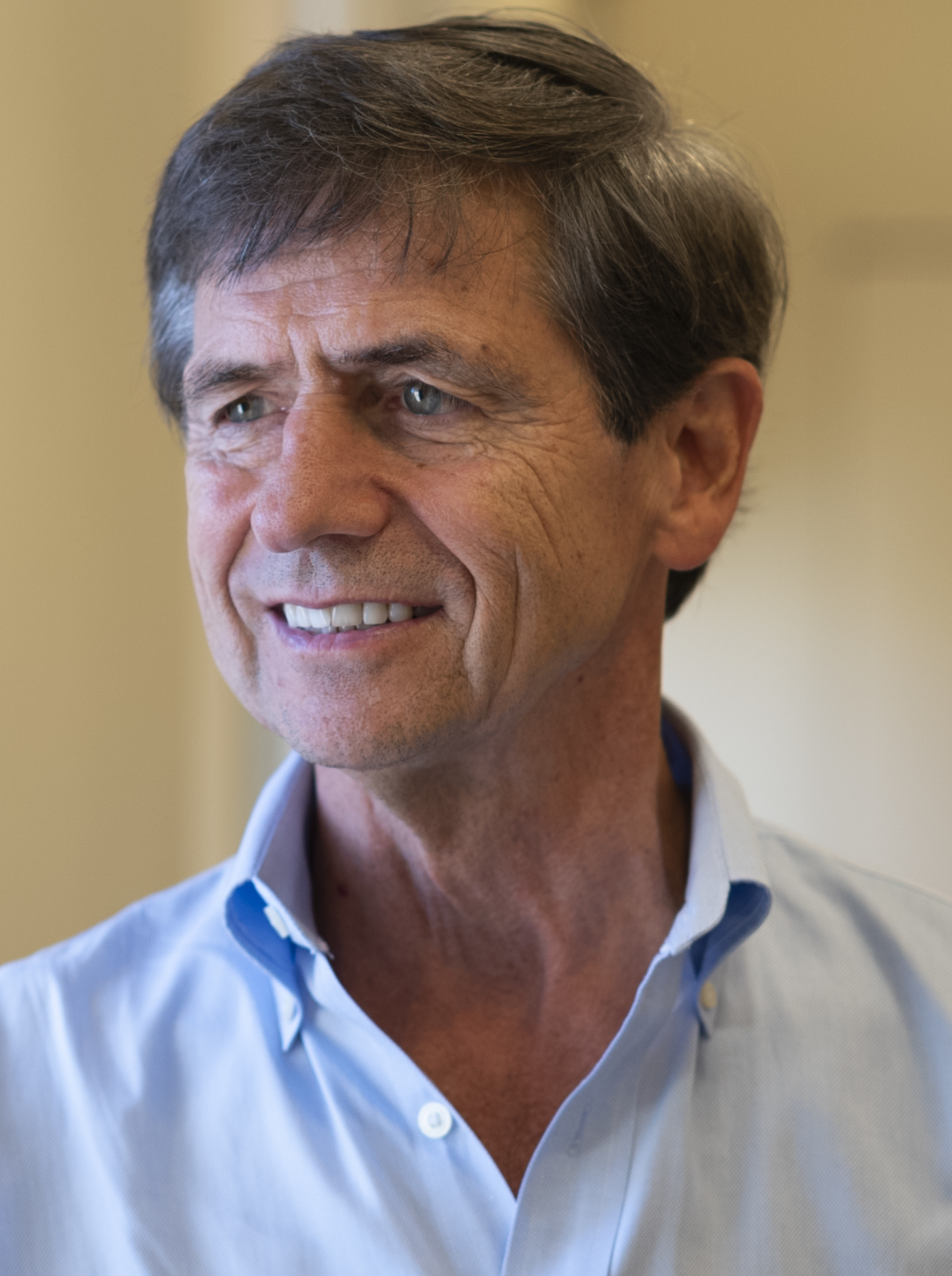
Former U.S. Representative Joe Sestak finished second in the primary.

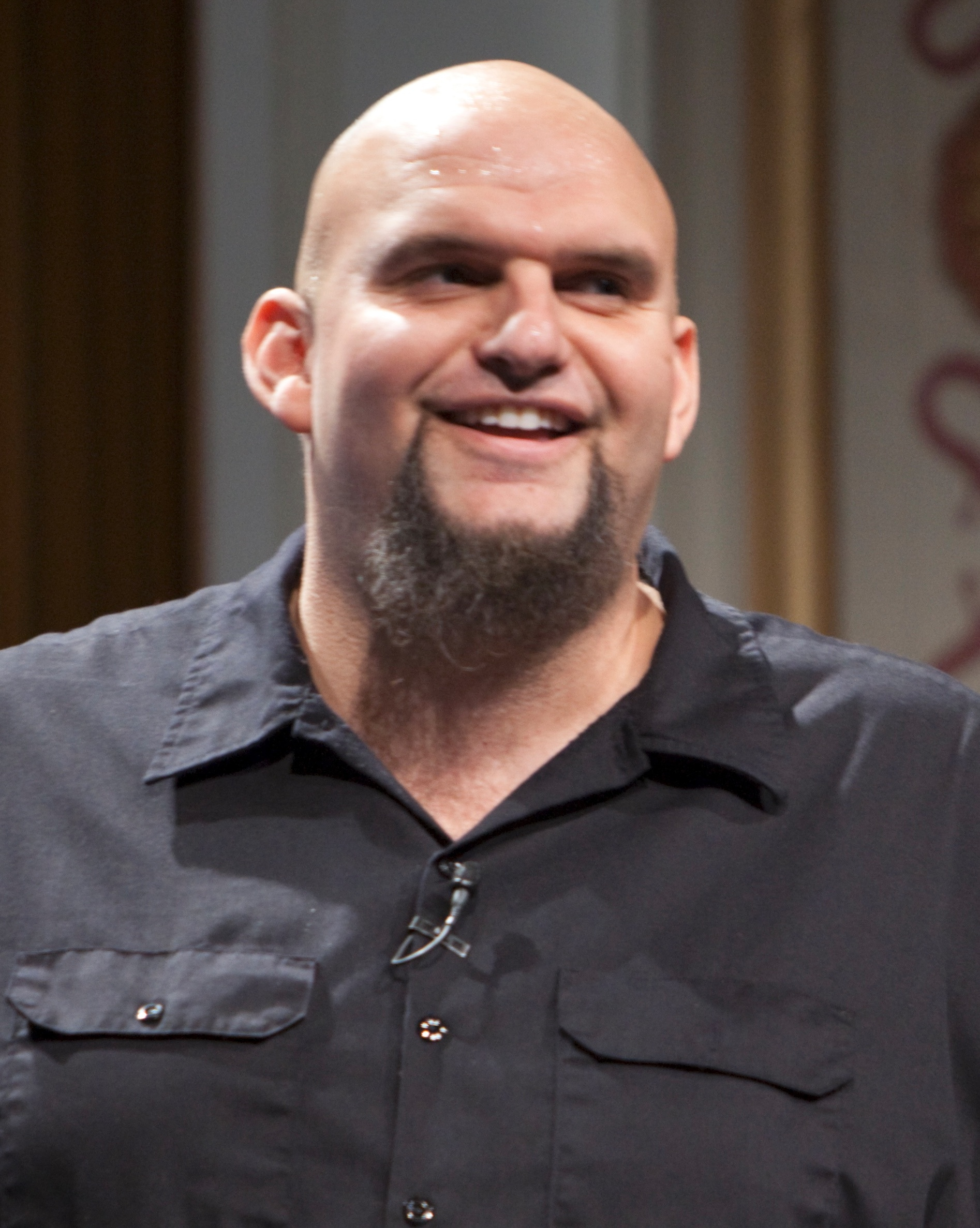
Mayor of Braddock John Fetterman finished third in the primary.

=== Candidates ===
==== Nominee ====
- Katie McGinty, former chief of staff to Governor Tom Wolf, former secretary of the Pennsylvania Department of Environmental Protection and candidate for the governorship in 2014

==== Eliminated in primary ====
- John Fetterman, mayor of Braddock
- Joe Sestak, retired Navy admiral, former U.S. representative and nominee for the U.S. Senate in 2010
- Joseph Vodvarka, small business owner and candidate for the U.S. Senate in 2010 and 2012

==== Declined ====
- Bob Brady, U.S. representative and chairman of the Philadelphia Democratic City Committee (endorsed Katie McGinty)
- Chris Carney, former U.S. representative
- Matt Cartwright, U.S. representative (endorsed Joe Sestak)
- Kathy Dahlkemper, Erie County executive and former U.S. representative (endorsed Katie McGinty)
- Eugene DePasquale, Pennsylvania auditor general (running for re-election)
- Rich Fitzgerald, Allegheny County executive (endorsed Katie McGinty)
- David Hickton, United States attorney for the Western District of Pennsylvania
- Vincent Hughes, state senator (endorsed Katie McGinty)
- Kathleen Kane, Pennsylvania attorney general
- Rob McCord, former Pennsylvania Treasurer and candidate for the governorship in 2014
- Patrick Murphy, former U.S. representative and candidate for attorney general in 2012
- Michael Nutter, mayor of Philadelphia (endorsed Katie McGinty)
- Ed Rendell, former governor of Pennsylvania (endorsed Katie McGinty)
- Allyson Schwartz, former U.S. representative and candidate for the governorship in 2014
- Josh Shapiro, chairman of the Montgomery County Board of Commissioners and former state representative (running for attorney general)
- Joe Torsella, United States representative to the United Nations for Management and Reform and former chairman of the Pennsylvania State Board of Education (running for state treasurer)
- R. Seth Williams, district attorney of Philadelphia

=== Endorsements ===
John Fetterman

Governors

- Martin O'Malley, 61st governor of Maryland (2007–2015), candidate for president in 2016

State officials

- Barbara Hafer, 33rd treasurer of Pennsylvania (1997–2005)

Individuals

- Marianne Williamson, founder of Project Angel Food

Organizations

- Pittsburgh NORML

Newspapers and publications

- The Patriot-News
Katie McGinty

Federal officials

- Joe Biden, 47th vice president of the United States (2009–2017)
- Hillary Clinton, 67th secretary of state (2009–2013), Democratic nominee for president in 2016, candidate for president in 2008
- Barack Obama, 44th president of the United States (2009–2017)

U.S. senators

- Barbara Boxer, U.S. senator from California (1993–2017)
- Sherrod Brown, U.S. senator from Ohio (2007–2025)
- Bob Casey, Jr., U.S. senator from Pennsylvania (2007–2025)
- Dianne Feinstein, U.S. senator from California (1992–2023)
- Al Franken, U.S. senator from Minnesota (2009–2018)
- Kirsten Gillibrand, U.S. senator from New York (2009–present)
- Martin Heinrich, U.S. senator from New Mexico (2013–present)
- Mazie Hirono, U.S. senator from Hawaii (2013–present)
- Patrick Leahy, U.S. senator from Vermont (1975–2023)
- Claire McCaskill, U.S. senator from Missouri (2007–2019)
- Jeff Merkley, U.S. senator from Oregon (2009–present)
- Chris Murphy, U.S. senator from Connecticut (2013–present)
- Patty Murray, U.S. senator from Washington (1993-present)
- Gary Peters, U.S. senator from Michigan (2015–present)
- Harry Reid, U.S. senator from Nevada (1987–2017), Senate Minority Leader (2015–2017)
- Brian Schatz, U.S. senator from Hawaii (2012–present)
- Chuck Schumer, U.S. senator from New York (1999–present)
- Jeanne Shaheen, U.S. senator from New Hampshire (2009–present)
- Jon Tester, U.S. senator from Montana (2007–2025)
- Mark Warner, U.S. senator from Virginia (2009–present)
- Elizabeth Warren, U.S. senator from Massachusetts (2013–present)
- Sheldon Whitehouse, U.S. senator from Rhode Island (2007–present)

U.S. representatives

- Bob Brady, U.S. representative from Pennsylvania's 1st congressional district (1998–2019), chairman of the Democratic Party of Philadelphia (1986–present)
- Michael F. Doyle, U.S. representative from Pennsylvania's 14th congressional district (2003–2019), Pennsylvania's 18th congressional district (1995–2003)

Governors

- Ed Rendell, 45th governor of Pennsylvania (2003–2011)
- Tom Wolf, 47th governor of Pennsylvania (2015–present)

State legislators

- Ryan Bizzarro, state representative from the 3rd district (2013–present)
- Jim Brewster, state senator from the 45th district (2010–present)
- Dom Costa, state representative from the 21st district (2009–2018)
- Jay Costa, state senator from the 43rd district (1996–present), Pennsylvania Senate Minority Leader (2011-present)
- Paul Costa, state representative from the 34th district (1999–2019)
- Dan Deasy, state representative from the 27th district (2009–present)
- Anthony M. DeLuca, state representative from the 32nd district (1983–present)
- Frank Dermody, state representative from the 33rd district (1991–2020), Pennsylvania House Minority Leader (2011–2020)
- Florindo Fabrizio, state representative from the 2nd district (2003–2018)
- Wayne D. Fontana, state senator from the 42nd district (2005–present)
- Dan Frankel, state representative from the 23rd district (1999–present)
- Ed Gainey, state representative from the 24th district (2013–2022)
- Marc Gergely, state representative from the 35th district (2003–2017)
- Pat Harkins, state representative from the 1st district (2007–present)
- Vincent Hughes, state senator from the 7th district (1994–present)
- Bill Kortz, state representative from the 38th district (2007–2021)
- Joe Markosek, state representative from the 25th district (1983–2018)

Municipal officials

- Kim Bracey, 24th mayor of York (2010–2018)
- Alan Butkovitz, Philadelphia city controller (2006–2018)
- Darrell Clarke, Philadelphia City Council president (2012–present)
- Carolyn Comitta, 58th mayor of West Chester (2010–2017)
- Kathy Dahlkemper, Erie County executive (2014–2022), U.S. representative from Pennsylvania's 3rd congressional district (2009–2011)
- Rich Fitzgerald, Allegheny County chief executive (2012–present)
- Elizabeth Goreham, mayor of State College (2010–2018)
- Rick Gray, mayor of Lancaster (2006–2018)
- Thomas Leighton, mayor of Wilkes-Barre (2004–2016)
- Michael Nutter, 98th mayor of Philadelphia (2008–2016)
- Bill Peduto, 60th mayor of Pittsburgh (2014–2022)

Individuals

- Ellen Malcolm, author and founder of EMILY's List
- Stephanie Schriock, president of EMILY's List

Labor unions

- AFL–CIO
- AFSCME
- Amalgamated Transit Union
- American Federation of Teachers
- International Alliance of Theatrical and Stage Employees Local 8
- International Brotherhood of Electrical Workers (IBEW)
- International Union of Operating Engineers Local 542
- Pennsylvania Association of Staff Nurses and Allied Professionals
- Pennsylvania State Education Association
- Service Employees International Union (SEIU)
- United Food and Commercial Workers Union Local 1776
- United Steelworkers (USW)

Organizations

- Democratic Senatorial Campaign Committee (DSCC)
- EMILY's List
- Equality Pennsylvania
- League of Conservation Voters Action Fund
- National Committee to Preserve Social Security and Medicare
- Ocean Champions
- Planned Parenthood

Newspapers and publications

- Philadelphia Daily News
Joe Sestak

U.S. representatives

- Matt Cartwright, U.S. representative from Pennsylvania's 17th congressional district

Individuals

- Manan Trivedi, nominee for Pennsylvania's 6th congressional district in 2010, 2012 and 2014

Organizations

- Council for a Livable World
- VoteVets.org

Newspapers and publications

- The Philadelphia Inquirer
- Philadelphia Tribune
- Pittsburgh Post-Gazette

=== Debates ===
A debate hosted by Carnegie Mellon University's Heinz College in association with the 14th Ward Independent Democratic Club featuring John Fetterman, Katie McGinty, and Joe Sestak occurred on January 31 at Rangos Hall in Jared L. Cohon University Center, Carnegie Mellon University, in Pittsburgh.

A debate hosted by Keystone Progress featuring John Fetterman, Katie McGinty, and Joe Sestak occurred on February 19 at the Hilton Harrisburg, in the Harrisburg Ballroom, in Harrisburg.

=== Polling ===
Poll source	Date(s) administered	Sample size	Margin of error	Joe Vodvarka	John Fetterman	Katie McGinty	Joe Sestak	Other	Undecided
FOX 29/Opinion Savvy	April 24–25, 2016	942	± 3.2%	–	14%	39%	34%	–	13%
Harper Polling	April 21–23, 2016	641	± 3.9%	3%	15%	39%	33%	–	11%
Monmouth University	April 17–19, 2016	302	± 5.6%	–	4%	39%	39%	–	18%
Franklin & Marshall College	April 11–18, 2016	510	± 5.3%	–	8%	27%	38%	2%	25%
Harper Polling	April 3–4, 2016	603	± 4.0%	–	9%	31%	41%	–	19%
Franklin & Marshall College	March 14–20, 2016	408	± 4.7%	–	7%	14%	31%	2%	46%
Harper Polling	March 1–2, 2016	662	± 3.6%	4%	15%	17%	33%	–	35%
Harper Polling	January 22–23, 2016	640	± 3.8%	–	11%	28%	33%	–	28%
Public Policy Polling	October 8–11, 2015	1,012	± 3.1%	–	14%	22%	29%	–	35%
Franklin & Marshall College	August 17–24, 2015	298	± ?	–	–	13%	16%	5%	66%

Hypothetical polling

Poll source	Date(s) administered	Sample size	Margin of error	Ed Pawlowski	Joe Sestak	Josh Shapiro	Other	Undecided
Robert Morris University	May 8–16, 2015	?	± ?	11.1%	44.7%	—	—	44.3%
Harper Polling	May 6–7, 2015	173	± 7.45%	12%	42%	8%	—	39%

Poll source	Date(s) administered	Sample size	Margin of error	Kathleen Kane	Joe Sestak	Other	Undecided
Harper Polling	February 22–23, 2014	501	± 4.38%	47%	24%	—	29%

=== Results ===
2016 United States Senate Democratic primary in Pennsylvania results McGinty — 50–60% McGinty — 40–50% McGinty — <40% Sestak — <40% Sestak — 40–50% Sestak — 60–70% Fetterman — 40–50%

2016 United States Senate Democratic primary in Pennsylvania results
Party	Candidate	Votes	%
Democratic	Katie McGinty	669,774	42.50%
Democratic	Joe Sestak	513,221	32.57%
Democratic	John Fetterman	307,090	19.49%
Democratic	Joseph Vodvarka	85,837	5.45%
Total votes		1,575,922	100.00%

== General election ==
=== Candidates ===
- Edward T. "Ed" Clifford, III (L), accountant
- Katie McGinty (D), former chief of staff to Governor Tom Wolf, former secretary of the Pennsylvania Department of Environmental Protection and candidate for governor in 2014
- Pat Toomey (R), incumbent

=== Debates ===
Dates	Location	Toomey	McGinty	Link
October 17, 2016	Pittsburgh, Pennsylvania	Participant	Participant	
October 24, 2016	Philadelphia, Pennsylvania	Participant	Participant	

=== Predictions ===
Source	Ranking	As of
The Cook Political Report	Tossup	November 2, 2016
Sabato's Crystal Ball	Lean D (flip)	November 7, 2016
Rothenberg Political Report	Tossup	November 3, 2016
Daily Kos	Lean D (flip)	November 8, 2016
Real Clear Politics	Tossup	November 7, 2016

=== Polling ===
View source data.

Poll source	Date(s) administered	Sample size	Margin of error	Pat Toomey (R)	Katie McGinty (D)	Edward Clifford (L)	Other	Undecided
SurveyMonkey	November 1–7, 2016	2,845	± 4.6%	45%	49%	—	—	6%
SurveyMonkey	October 31–November 6, 2016	2,685	± 4.6%	45%	50%	—	—	5%
CBS News/YouGov	November 3–5, 2016	931	± 4.3%	46%	47%	—	1%	6%
Clarity Campaign Labs	November 1–4, 2016	1,033	± 3.0%	43%	46%	—	—	11%
Muhlenberg College/Morning Call	October 30–November 4, 2016	405	± 5.5%	43%	42%	—	—	15%
Harper Polling	November 2–3, 2016	504	± 4.4%	44%	44%	6%	—	5%
SurveyMonkey	October 28–November 3, 2016	2,454	± 4.6%	45%	50%	—	—	5%
Breitbart/Gravis Marketing	November 1–2, 2016	1,016	± 3.1%	43%	45%	—	—	12%
Susquehanna Polling & Research	October 31–November 2, 2016	681	± 3.8%	41%	47%	5%	1%	7%
SurveyMonkey	October 27–November 2, 2016	2,177	± 4.6%	46%	50%	—	—	4%
Public Policy Polling	October 31–November 1, 2016	1,050	± 3.0%	44%	46%	—	—	10%
Monmouth University	October 29–November 1, 2016	403	± 4.9%	44%	47%	3%	—	6%
CNN/ORC	October 27–November 1, 2016	799 LV	± 3.5%	46%	51%	—	1%	1%
CNN/ORC	October 27–November 1, 2016	917 RV	± 3.0%	47%	49%	—	1%	2%
Quinnipiac University	October 27–November 1, 2016	612	± 4.0%	47%	48%	—	1%	5%
SurveyMonkey	October 26–November 2, 2016	2,078	± 4.6%	46%	50%	—	—	4%
SurveyMonkey	October 25–31, 2016	2,255	± 4.6%	46%	49%	—	—	5%
Franklin & Marshall College	October 26–30, 2016	652 LV	± 5.1%	35%	47%	1%	2%	16%
Franklin & Marshall College	October 26–30, 2016	863 RV	± 4.4%	33%	43%	—	1%	23%
Breitbart/Gravis Marketing	October 25–30, 2016	3,217	± 1.7%	41%	45%	—	—	13%
CBS News/YouGov	October 26–28, 2016	1,091	± 3.7%	41%	44%	—	2%	13%
Emerson College	October 25–26, 2016	550	± 4.1%	43%	45%	—	7%	5%
Muhlenberg College/Morning Call	October 20–26, 2016	420	± 5.5%	41%	41%	—	1%	17%
New York Times Upshot/Siena College	October 23–25, 2016	824	± 3.4%	44%	47%	—	—	9%
Emerson College	October 17–19, 2016	800	± 3.4%	46%	43%	—	5%	7%
Quinnipiac University	October 10–16, 2016	660	± 3.8%	49%	45%	—	—	6%
Washington Post/SurveyMonkey	October 8–16, 2016	1,449	± 0.5%	47%	47%	—	—	6%
Bloomberg/Selzer	October 7–11, 2016	806	± 3.5%	45%	47%	—	2%	4%
The Times-Picayune/Lucid	October 7–10, 2016	1,457	± 3.0%	44%	44%	—	—	12%
Susquehanna Polling & Research	October 4–9, 2016	764	± 3.5%	42%	38%	7%	1%	12%
CBS News/YouGov	October 5–7, 2016	997	± 4.2%	42%	42%	—	1%	15%
NBC/WSJ/Marist	October 3–6, 2016	709	± 3.7%	44%	48%	—	2%	6%
Monmouth University	September 30–October 3, 2016	402	± 4.9%	46%	46%	3%	—	5%
Franklin & Marshall College	September 28–October 2, 2016	496 LV	± 6.1%	35%	41%	2%	—	22%
Franklin & Marshall College	September 28–October 2, 2016	813 RV	± 4.8%	31%	36%	—	11%	22%
Quinnipiac University	September 27–October 2, 2016	535	± 4.2%	50%	42%	—	—	7%
Public Policy Polling	September 27–28, 2016	886	± 3.3%	35%	40%	9%	—	16%
Public Policy Polling	September 27–28, 2016	886	± 3.3%	42%	44%	—	—	14%
CNN/ORC	September 20–25, 2016	771 LV	± 3.5%	46%	49%	—	—	2%
CNN/ORC	September 20–25, 2016	895 RV	± 3.5%	46%	49%	—	—	2%
Breitbart/Gravis Marketing	September 23, 2016	949	± 3.2%	39%	43%	—	—	18%
Harper Polling	September 21–22, 2016	500	± 4.4%	42%	42%	8%	—	8%
Muhlenberg College/Morning Call	September 19–23, 2016	486	± 5.0%	41%	40%	—	—	20%
Mercyhurst University	September 12–23, 2016	420	± 4.8%	43%	42%	—	—	15%
Greenberg Quinlan Rosner - Democracy Corps	September 10–19, 2016	400	± 4.0%	45%	43%	—	—	12%
Muhlenberg College/Morning Call	September 12–16, 2016	405	± 5.5%	38%	43%	—	—	19%
Quinnipiac University	August 29–September 7, 2016	778	± 3.5%	46%	45%	—	1%	7%
CBS News/YouGov	August 30–September 2, 2016	1,091	± 4.1%	39%	39%	—	2%	20%
Public Policy Polling	August 30–31, 2016	814	± 3.4%	41%	44%	—	—	15%
Public Policy Polling	August 26–27, 2016	1,194	± 3.0%	40%	46%	—	—	14%
Monmouth University	August 26–29, 2016	402	± 4.9%	41%	45%	6%	—	8%
Franklin & Marshall College	August 25–29, 2016	496 LV	± 5.6%	38%	43%	—	—	18%
Franklin & Marshall College	August 25–29, 2016	736 RV	± 4.6%	37%	36%	—	—	27%
Emerson College	August 25–28, 2016	800	± 3.4%	46%	39%	—	5%	10%
GBA Strategies	August 21–28, 2016	881	± 4.4%	42%	47%	—	8%	3%
Quinnipiac University	July 30–August 7, 2016	815	± 3.4%	44%	47%	—	—	9%
NBC/WSJ/Marist	August 3–7, 2016	834	± 3.4%	44%	48%	—	1%	7%
Susquehanna Polling & Research	July 31–August 4, 2016	772	± 3.5%	40%	42%	—	2%	16%
Franklin & Marshall College	July 29–August 1, 2016	389 LV	± 6.3%	38%	39%	—	—	23%
Franklin & Marshall College	July 29–August 1, 2016	661 RV	± 4.8%	30%	38%	—	—	32%
Public Policy Polling	July 29–31, 2016	1,505	± 2.7%	42%	41%	—	—	17%
Suffolk University	July 25–27, 2016	500	± 4.4%	36%	43%	—	1%	19%
Quinnipiac University	June 30–July 11, 2016	982	± 3.1%	49%	39%	—	1%	9%
NBC/WSJ/Marist	July 5–10, 2016	829	± 3.4%	44%	47%	—	2%	8%
Public Policy Polling	June 22–23, 2016	980	± 3.1%	40%	39%	—	—	21%
Greenberg Quinlan Rosner - Democracy Corps	June 11–20, 2016	300	± 5.7%	46%	38%	—	—	16%
Quinnipiac University	June 8–19, 2016	950	± 3.2%	49%	40%	—	—	8%
Public Policy Polling	June 8–9, 2016	965	± 3.2%	45%	42%	—	—	12%
Public Policy Polling	June 3–5, 2016	1,106	± 3.0%	41%	38%	—	—	21%
Quinnipiac University	April 27–May 8, 2016	1,077	± 3.0%	45%	44%	—	—	11%
Quinnipiac University	March 30–April 4, 2016	1,737	± 2.4%	47%	38%	—	1%	12%
Mercyhurst University	March 1–11, 2016	421	± 4.8%	47%	34%	—	2%	13%
Harper Polling	March 1–2, 2016	662	± 3.75%	47%	39%	—	—	13%
Robert Morris University	February 11–16, 2016	511	± 4.5%	34%	21%	—	—	45%
Public Policy Polling	October 8–11, 2015	1,012	± 3.1%	43%	36%	—	—	21%
Quinnipiac University	September 25–October 5, 2015	1,049	± 3.0%	51%	31%	—	1%	15%
Harper Polling	September 9–10, 2015	700	± 3.7%	48%	34%	—	—	18%
Franklin & Marshall College	August 17–24, 2015	605	± 3.9%	35%	28%	—	—	38%
Quinnipiac University	August 7–18, 2015	1,085	± 3%	48%	32%	—	1%	17%
Public Policy Polling	May 30–June 1, 2014	835	± 3.4%	42%	38%	—	—	20%

Hypothetical polling

Poll source	Date(s) administered	Sample size	Margin of error	Pat Toomey (R)	John Fetterman (D)	Other	Undecided
Mercyhurst University	March 1–11, 2016	421	± 4.8%	49%	31%	2%	15%
Harper Polling	March 1–2, 2016	662	± 3.75%	47%	36%	—	16%
Robert Morris University	February 11–16, 2016	511	± 4.5%	38%	14%	—	49%
Public Policy Polling	October 8–11, 2015	1,012	± -3.1	41%	34%	—	24%

Poll source	Date(s) administered	Sample size	Margin of error	Pat Toomey (R)	Joe Sestak (D)	Other	Undecided
Quinnipiac University	March 30–April 4, 2016	1,737	± 2.4%	47%	39%	1%	10%
Mercyhurst University	March 1–11, 2016	421	± 4.8%	43%	38%	1%	15%
Harper Polling	March 1–2, 2016	662	± 3.75%	47%	41%	—	13%
Robert Morris University	February 11–16, 2016	511	± 4.5%	34%	18%	—	48%
Public Policy Polling	October 8–11, 2015	1,012	± -3.1	41%	38%	—	21%
Quinnipiac University	September 25-October 5, 2015	1,049	± 3.0%	49%	34%	1%	13%
Harper Polling	September 9–10, 2015	700	± 3.7%	47%	37%	—	15%
Franklin & Marshall College	August 17–24, 2015	605	± 3.9%	41%	29%	—	31%
Quinnipiac University	August 7–18, 2015	1,085	± 3%	48%	33%	1%	15%
Quinnipiac University	June 4–15, 2015	970	± 3.2%	47%	36%	1%	16%
Franklin & Marshall College	June 8–14, 2015	556	± 4.1%	35%	31%	—	34%
Public Policy Polling	May 21–24, 2015	799	± 3.5%	42%	38%	—	20%
Robert Morris University	May 8–16, 2015	529	± 4.5%	28.5%	34.2%	—	37.3%
Harper Polling	May 6–7, 2015	503	± 4.37%	53%	32%	—	15%
Quinnipiac University	March 17–28, 2015	1,036	± 3%	48%	35%	1%	16%
Franklin & Marshall College	March 17–23, 2015	597	± 4.2%	34%	29%	—	37%
Quinnipiac University	Jan. 22–Feb. 1, 2015	881	± 3.3%	45%	35%	—	20%
Public Policy Polling	January 15–18, 2015	1,042	± 3%	40%	36%	—	23%
Public Policy Polling	May 30 – June 1, 2014	835	± 3.4%	41%	35%	—	24%
Harper Polling	December 21–22, 2013	604	± 4%	49%	42%	—	9%
Public Policy Polling	November 22–25, 2013	693	± 3.7%	42%	42%	—	16%
Quinnipiac University	May 30 – June 4, 2013	1,032	± 3.1%	42%	37%	1%	21%

Poll source	Date(s) administered	Sample size	Margin of error	Pat Toomey (R)	Chris Carney (D)	Other	Undecided
Public Policy Polling	May 21–24, 2015	799	± 3.5%	44%	35%	—	20%

Poll source	Date(s) administered	Sample size	Margin of error	Pat Toomey (R)	Vincent Hughes (D)	Other	Undecided
Public Policy Polling	May 21–24, 2015	799	± 3.5%	44%	35%	—	21%

Poll source	Date(s) administered	Sample size	Margin of error	Pat Toomey (R)	Kathleen Kane (D)	Other	Undecided
Public Policy Polling	January 15–18, 2015	1,042	± 3%	44%	38%	—	17%
Public Policy Polling	May 30 – June 1, 2014	835	± 3.4%	40%	42%	—	19%
Harper Polling	December 21–22, 2013	604	± 4%	49%	44%	—	7%
Public Policy Polling	November 22–25, 2013	693	± 3.7%	42%	46%	—	12%

Poll source	Date(s) administered	Sample size	Margin of error	Pat Toomey (R)	Chris Matthews (D)	Other	Undecided
Public Policy Polling	January 15–18, 2015	1,042	± 3%	42%	38%	—	20%

Poll source	Date(s) administered	Sample size	Margin of error	Pat Toomey (R)	Michael Nutter (D)	Other	Undecided
Public Policy Polling	January 15–18, 2015	1,042	± 3%	42%	35%	—	23%

Poll source	Date(s) administered	Sample size	Margin of error	Pat Toomey (R)	Ed Pawlowski (D)	Other	Undecided
Mercyhurst University	March 1–11, 2016	421	± 4.8%	47%	31%	2%	16%
Quinnipiac University	June 4–15, 2015	970	± 3.2%	52%	28%	1%	19%
Franklin & Marshall College	June 8–14, 2015	556	± 4.1%	34%	23%	—	43%
Public Policy Polling	May 21–24, 2015	799	± 3.5%	44%	34%	—	22%
Harper Polling	May 6–7, 2015	503	± 4.37%	54%	30%	—	16%

Poll source	Date(s) administered	Sample size	Margin of error	Pat Toomey (R)	Ed Rendell (D)	Other	Undecided
Public Policy Polling	May 21–24, 2015	799	± 3.5%	46%	41%	—	13%
Public Policy Polling	January 15–18, 2015	1,042	± 3%	41%	44%	—	15%

Poll source	Date(s) administered	Sample size	Margin of error	Pat Toomey (R)	Josh Shapiro (D)	Other	Undecided
Harper Polling	May 6–7, 2015	503	± 4.37%	55%	27%	—	18%
Public Policy Polling	January 15–18, 2015	1,042	± 3%	43%	31%	—	26%
Public Policy Polling	May 30 – June 1, 2014	835	± 3.4%	41%	32%	—	28%

Poll source	Date(s) administered	Sample size	Margin of error	Pat Toomey (R)	Seth Williams (D)	Other	Undecided
Public Policy Polling	May 21–24, 2015	799	± 3.5%	44%	33%	—	23%

=== Results ===

United States Senate election in Pennsylvania, 2016
Party	Candidate	Votes	%	±%
Republican	Pat Toomey (incumbent)	2,951,702	48.72%	−2.26%
Democratic	Katie McGinty	2,865,012	47.29%	−1.67%
Libertarian	Edward T. Clifford III	235,142	3.88%	N/A
Write-in		6,655	0.11%	+0.05%
Total votes		6,058,511	100.00%	N/A
Republican hold				

=== By county ===
County	Katie McGinty Democratic		Patrick J. Toomey Republican		Edward T. Clifford III Libertarian		Margin		Total votes cast
County	#	%	#	%	#	%	#	%	Total votes cast
Adams	14,593	30.72%	30,492	64.19%	2,418	5.09%	15,899	33.47%	47,503
Allegheny	357,450	55.25%	261,316	40.39%	28,260	4.37%	-96,134	-14.86%	647,026
Armstrong	8,387	26.71%	20,793	66.22%	2,220	7.07%	12,406	39.51%	31,400
Beaver	34,263	41.12%	44,000	52.81%	5,058	6.07%	9,737	11.69%	83,321
Bedford	4,356	18.58%	17,739	75.68%	1,344	5.73%	13,383	57.10%	23,439
Berks	77,028	42.93%	95,466	53.21%	6,919	3.86%	18,438	10.28%	179,413
Blair	15,107	27.57%	36,533	66.68%	3,150	5.75%	21,426	39.11%	54,790
Bradford	6,985	27.33%	16,574	64.85%	2,000	7.83%	9,589	37.52%	25,559
Bucks	157,709	46.46%	175,898	51.82%	5,845	1.72%	18,189	5.36%	339,452
Butler	28,715	29.72%	62,425	64.62%	5,465	5.66%	33,710	34.89%	96,605
Cambria	21,894	34.90%	36,948	58.90%	3,886	6.20%	15,054	24.00%	62,728
Cameron	593	27.53%	1,390	64.53%	171	7.94%	797	37.00%	2,154
Carbon	10,086	35.75%	16,360	57.98%	1,770	6.27%	6,274	22.24%	28,216
Centre	35,487	46.45%	36,527	47.82%	4,378	5.73%	1,040	1.36%	76,392
Chester	127,552	47.10%	133,662	49.36%	9,588	3.54%	6,110	2.26%	270,802
Clarion	4,931	28.27%	11,310	64.83%	1,204	6.90%	6,379	36.57%	17,445
Clearfield	9,454	27.80%	22,128	65.06%	2,429	7.14%	12,674	37.26%	34,011
Clinton	5,511	36.34%	8,702	57.38%	952	6.28%	3,191	21.04%	15,165
Columbia	9,819	34.94%	16,292	57.97%	1,991	7.08%	6,473	23.03%	28,102
Crawford	11,047	29.65%	24,472	65.68%	1,740	4.67%	13,425	36.03%	37,259
Cumberland	44,796	36.74%	71,638	58.75%	5,509	4.52%	26,842	22.01%	121,943
Dauphin	62,551	48.61%	63,740	49.54%	2,383	1.85%	1,189	0.92%	128,674
Delaware	163,377	55.64%	126,300	43.01%	3,948	1.34%	-37,077	-12.63%	293,625
Elk	4,509	31.48%	8,703	60.76%	1,111	7.76%	4,194	29.28%	14,323
Erie	56,846	46.32%	60,948	49.66%	4,930	4.02%	4,102	3.34%	122,724
Fayette	20,547	38.62%	29,699	55.82%	2,958	5.56%	9,152	17.20%	53,204
Forest	708	29.82%	1,502	63.27%	164	6.91%	794	33.45%	2,374
Franklin	17,827	25.54%	48,658	69.72%	3,309	4.74%	30,831	44.17%	69,794
Fulton	1,025	15.23%	5,456	81.06%	250	3.71%	4,431	65.83%	6,731
Greene	5,692	36.93%	8,826	57.26%	896	5.81%	3,134	20.33%	15,414
Huntingdon	5,105	26.06%	13,078	66.76%	1,406	7.18%	7,973	40.70%	19,589
Indiana	12,592	33.32%	22,245	58.86%	2,955	7.82%	9,653	25.54%	37,792
Jefferson	4,160	21.54%	13,706	70.95%	1,451	7.51%	9,546	49.42%	19,317
Juniata	2,153	20.66%	7,657	73.47%	612	5.87%	5,504	52.81%	10,422
Lackawanna	53,936	52.93%	40,519	39.76%	7,455	7.32%	-13,417	-13.17%	101,910
Lancaster	89,922	37.07%	142,774	58.85%	9,909	4.08%	52,852	21.79%	242,605
Lawrence	15,289	37.96%	22,674	56.29%	2,317	5.75%	7,385	18.33%	40,280
Lebanon	19,079	31.01%	39,386	64.02%	3,060	4.97%	20,307	33.01%	61,525
Lehigh	77,232	48.25%	76,216	47.61%	6,627	4.14%	-1,016	-0.63%	160,075
Luzerne	56,477	42.89%	66,551	50.54%	8,650	6.57%	10,074	7.65%	131,678
Lycoming	14,187	28.06%	33,015	65.29%	3,365	6.65%	18,828	37.23%	50,567
Mckean	3,987	24.73%	11,530	71.52%	605	3.75%	7,543	46.79%	16,122
Mercer	19,193	37.05%	30,567	59.00%	2,046	3.95%	11,374	21.95%	51,806
Mifflin	4,031	22.13%	13,089	71.87%	1,093	6.00%	9,058	49.73%	18,213
Monroe	34,280	51.32%	30,743	46.03%	1,768	2.65%	-3,537	-5.30%	66,791
Montgomery	237,353	54.90%	189,574	43.85%	5,431	1.26%	-47,779	-11.05%	432,358
Montour	2,898	33.89%	5,066	59.25%	586	6.85%	2,168	25.36%	8,550
Northampton	64,151	45.86%	72,172	51.59%	3,566	2.55%	8,021	5.73%	139,889
Northumberland	11,117	31.28%	21,826	61.42%	2,592	7.29%	10,709	30.14%	35,535
Perry	4,962	23.53%	14,898	70.64%	1,231	5.84%	9,936	47.11%	21,091
Philadelphia	560,421	81.79%	116,714	17.03%	8,030	1.17%	-443,707	-64.76%	685,165
Pike	9,329	36.39%	15,192	59.27%	1,113	4.34%	5,863	22.87%	25,634
Potter	1,387	18.01%	5,990	77.79%	323	4.19%	4,603	59.78%	7,700
Schuylkill	19,539	31.45%	37,757	60.77%	4,832	7.78%	18,218	29.32%	62,128
Snyder	4,299	26.40%	10,867	66.74%	1,116	6.85%	6,568	40.34%	16,282
Somerset	8,340	23.34%	25,470	71.28%	1,923	5.38%	17,130	47.94%	35,733
Sullivan	867	28.03%	2,020	65.31%	206	6.66%	1,153	37.28%	3,093
Susquehanna	5,535	28.76%	11,996	62.33%	1,716	8.92%	6,461	33.57%	19,247
Tioga	3,992	21.97%	13,418	73.83%	764	4.20%	9,426	51.87%	18,174
Union	6,092	34.81%	10,568	60.39%	841	4.81%	4,476	25.58%	17,501
Venango	6,989	30.11%	14,581	62.83%	1,638	7.06%	7,592	32.71%	23,208
Warren	5,124	28.14%	12,130	66.60%	958	5.26%	7,006	38.47%	18,212
Washington	38,133	37.79%	56,952	56.44%	5,824	5.77%	18,819	18.65%	100,909
Wayne	7,487	31.42%	14,538	61.01%	1,803	7.57%	7,051	29.59%	23,828
Westmoreland	62,981	34.94%	107,532	59.65%	9,745	5.41%	44,551	24.72%	180,258
Wyoming	4,154	31.79%	7,844	60.03%	1,068	8.17%	3,690	28.24%	13,066
York	69,394	33.68%	126,350	61.33%	10,271	4.99%	56,956	27.65%	206,015
Pennsylvania	2,865,012	47.34%	2,951,702	48.77%	235,142	3.89%	86,690	1.43%	6,051,856

==== Counties that flipped from Democratic to Republican ====
- Erie (largest municipality: Erie)
- Luzerne (largest municipality: Wilkes-Barre)

==== Counties that flipped from Republican to Democratic ====
- Lehigh (largest municipality: Allentown)
- Monroe (largest municipality: East Stroudsburg)

== See also ==
- 2016 United States Senate elections
