= David Freed =

David Freed may refer to:

- David Freed (author) (born 1954), American author, educator, journalist and screenwriter
- David Freed (attorney) (born 1970), District Attorney of Cumberland County, Pennsylvania
- David Freed (printmaker) (born 1935), American artist
