= Kathleen Kane =

American politician (born 1966)

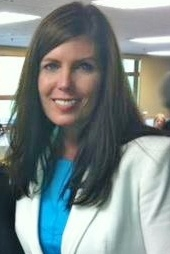
- Kane in July 2012

Attorney General of Pennsylvania
- In office January 15, 2013 – August 17, 2016
- Governor: Tom Corbett; Tom Wolf
- Preceded by: Linda Kelly
- Succeeded by: Bruce Beemer

Personal details
- Born: Kathleen Margaret Granahan Scranton, Pennsylvania, U.S.
- Party: Democratic
- Spouse: Christopher Kane (2000-2014)
- Children: 2
- Education: University of Scranton (BS); Temple University (JD)
- Criminal information
- Criminal charges: • Perjury (one count) • False swearing (one count) • Obstructing administration of law (three counts) • Official oppression in connection with grand jury leaks (four counts)
- Penalty: 10–23 months incarceration

Kathleen Granahan Kane (born Kathleen Margaret Granahan) is an American former politician and lawyer who served as the attorney general of Pennsylvania from 2013 until her resignation in 2016, following her conviction for perjury, obstruction of justice, and related charges for illegal activities while she was attorney general. She was the first woman and first Democrat ever elected to the position.

In August 2015, Kane was charged with offenses committed as attorney general, including felony perjury, official oppression, obstruction, and related conspiracy charges. In Office of Disciplinary Counsel v. Kane (2015), the Supreme Court of Pennsylvania suspended Kane's law license, becoming the first Pennsylvania attorney general to lose their license.

On August 15, 2016, Kane was convicted of all charges, including two felony perjury charges, conspiracy, and obstruction of justice. Kane announced her resignation as attorney general the following day, effective August 17. Kane exhausted her appeals in November 2018 and reported to prison. Kane was subsequently disbarred by the Supreme Court of Pennsylvania in March 2019. In July 2019, Kane was also disbarred from federal practice by the Middle District of Pennsylvania.

On November 29, 2018, she reported to the Montgomery County Correctional Facility to begin serving her 10–to–23-month prison term after having exhausted her appeal efforts. On July 31, 2019, Kane was released. On April 30, 2022, she was taken back into custody for an alleged violation of probation by driving under the influence.

== Early life and education ==
Kane was born Kathleen Margaret Granahan and grew up on the west side of Scranton, Pennsylvania, where she attended West Scranton High School. Kane received a Bachelor of Science degree in international studies from the University of Scranton in 1988 and J.D. from Temple University Law School in 1993.

== Career ==
Kane was an attorney at Post & Schell P.C., a Philadelphia law firm, prior to 1995 and handled civil cases. From 1995 to 2007, she served as an assistant district attorney for Lackawanna County, Pennsylvania, where she prosecuted hundreds of sex-abuse, elder abuse, murder, assault, rape, public corruption, and fraud cases. In 2007, Kane worked for a private law firm in Scranton, Pennsylvania, and took a position with the 2008 Hillary Clinton presidential campaign.

== Pennsylvania Attorney General ==
=== 2012 election ===
Kane announced her candidacy for Pennsylvania Attorney General in the 2012 election. She received endorsements from U.S. President Bill Clinton and The Philadelphia Inquirer during the Democratic primary. Her primary opponent, former U.S. Representative Patrick Murphy, was endorsed by former Pennsylvania Governor Ed Rendell and the Pittsburgh Post-Gazette. Kane defeated Murphy 53% to 47%. In the general election, Kane won by 14.5 percent over Cumberland County District Attorney David Freed who ran unopposed in the Republican primary. The win made Kane the first woman elected State Attorney General in Pennsylvania, (Note: Two women, Anne Alpern and Linda Kelly, were previously appointed to the position. The position first became an elected office in 1980.) and the first Democrat elected to the position since it ceased being an appointed office in 1980. Kane received more votes than President Obama or Senator Casey did in Pennsylvania during the 2012 elections; her total number of votes was then the fourth highest of any politician in Pennsylvania electoral history.

Kane appointed former federal prosecutor H. Geoffrey Moulton Jr. to investigate Governor Tom Corbett's handling of the Penn State child sex abuse scandal (an investigation which showed that no legal wrongdoing by Corbett took place), and brought criminal charges against former turnpike officials (and then dealt plea bargains with the accused parties, which resulted in none of the accused serving any jail time). Kane made national headlines in July 2013, when she refused to defend Pennsylvania's gay marriage prohibition in court.

On March 17, 2014, Kane announced that she had shut down a corruption investigation begun under her predecessor, saying that "the undercover investigation was poorly managed and badly executed, and relied on an undercover operative whose credibility had been compromised." Kane also asserted she had documentation to support her assertion that racism marred the sting. The investigation was following up on reports of corruption among current Philadelphia politicians, all of the suspects belonged to the Democratic Party. In response, the Committee of Seventy called on the state legislature to designate an independent counsel to investigate the closing of the case. Local prosecutors in Philadelphia picked up the case, and secured a number of guilty pleas as well as grand jury indictments.

==== Child sex abuse investigation ====
As part of renewed attention in the state to Catholic Church child sexual abuse and cover-up accusations, Kane initiated a statewide grand jury—starting toward establishment in early 2014—and a hotline which garnered another 250 cases to investigate. Some twenty troopers operated the phones and assistant AG Daniel J. Dye led the case in the Diocese of Altoona-Johnstown and was still sifting the other reports in 2016. State Representative Thomas R. Caltagirone, minority chairman of the Judiciary Committee and former opponent of legislation to extend the statute of limitations for the crimes, had come to favor such legislation in 2016. National Catholic Register criticized Kane's handling of the sex abuse scandal in the Diocese of Altoona-Johnstown, as charges still could have been filed against individuals who had taken part in a hush money ring which was created by former Bishop Joseph Adamec, and noted that she herself was a Catholic.

==== 2016 election ====
Kane was mentioned as a potential Democratic candidate for the 2016 U.S. Senate election against Republican incumbent Pat Toomey. However, Kane declined to run, instead announcing that she would seek a second term as attorney general in 2016. She later announced that she would not run for re-election.

== Criminal investigation, trial, conviction, resignation, and disbarment ==
=== Indictment and suspension of license to practice law ===
Beginning in 2014, a grand jury investigated the leaking of two memos which allegedly came from Kane's office: one from a 2009 grand jury investigation, and an internal memo leaked to the Philadelphia Daily News which outlined details of the 2009 investigation. The leaks came at a time when Kane was under intense criticism for failure to effectively prosecute Democrats, both in a bribery sting investigation in Philadelphia, and a pay-to-play scandal involving the Pennsylvania Turnpike.

Kane believed former state prosecutor Frank Fina was behind a March 2014 story in the Inquirer that disclosed that she had secretly shut down a sting investigation that had recorded Philadelphia Democrats accepting cash, money orders, or gifts from an undercover operative. Fina, for many years the head of corruption cases for the Attorney General's Office, launched the sting before Kane took office in 2013.

After the Philadelphia Daily News article, Kane orchestrated a leak of confidential grand jury information about an investigation once run by Fina, one that she believed showed he had failed to aggressively pursue corruption allegations against the onetime head of the Philadelphia NAACP.

In searching for information to discredit Fina, she discovered a trove of emails containing pornography and other offensive content that were exchanged among state prosecutors, defense lawyers, and judges, including two former Supreme Court justices. Porngate, as it came to be called, led to the retirements or resignations of more than a half-dozen high-profile public officials, including onetime Supreme Court Justices Seamus P. McCaffery and J. Michael Eakin. Kane said repeatedly that she believed her criminal case was "corruptly manufactured" by a club of "good ol' boys" bent on preventing her from making those emails public – although many of them were eventually released.

On January 21, 2015, it was made public that the grand jury recommended criminal charges related to these leaks against Kane for "perjury, false swearing, official oppression and obstruction of law."

On August 6, Kane was charged by Montgomery County District Attorney Risa Vetri Ferman with one count of perjury, one count of false swearing, three counts of obstructing administration of law, and four counts of official oppression in connection with the grand jury leaks. That same day, Governor Tom Wolf publicly called on Kane to resign. However, Kane denied the charges and announced that she would not resign.

On August 24, Kane was ordered to stand trial on charges she leaked secret grand jury information to the press, lied under oath about it and ordered aides to illegally snoop through computer files to keep tabs on an investigation into the leaks. The leak, it was stated, was done to embarrass rival prosecutors involved in the case. Prosecutors called two witnesses—a top Kane aide and the lead investigator in the case against her—whose testimony paralleled a 42-page probable cause affidavit filed against her.

On September 21, the Pennsylvania Supreme Court unanimously suspended Kane's license to practice law, as a result of the criminal charges. Although the Constitution of Pennsylvania requires the attorney general to be a licensed attorney, the court said in its order that it was not removing Kane from office. Subsequently, Kane appointed former Montgomery County District Attorney and County Commissioner Bruce L. Castor, Jr., a Republican, as Solicitor General of Pennsylvania to assume her executive decision making authority, a position Castor retained until becoming acting attorney general for a period after Kane resigned, and before Democratic Governor Tom Wolf could appoint Bruce Beemer to the post. Castor remained in service to Beemer, reverting to his role as solicitor general for several weeks before resigning to return to the private sector.

On October 1, prosecutors filed an additional perjury charge against Kane. This second charge related to the alleged violation of a secrecy oath that Kane signed in January 2013, also relating to grand jury leaks.

In continuing as attorney general with a suspended license, Kane delegated legal responsibilities to her top advisers. On November 1, 2015, Kane announced a team of special prosecutors to lead the 'Porngate' investigation at the National Constitution Center.

=== Trial, conviction, resignation from office, and disbarment ===
Kane's criminal trial began on August 8, 2016. One week later, on August 15, she was convicted on all nine counts. The next day, Kane announced her resignation as attorney general, effective August 17. State Solicitor General Bruce Castor, Kane's second-in-command, became acting Attorney General once her resignation took effect. Sentencing for her case took place on October 24, 2016, where she received a term of 10–23 months in prison.

A tribunal of judges on the Superior Court of Pennsylvania affirmed her conviction in May 2018. The court rejected her arguments that the special prosecutor lacked legitimacy and that she should have been allowed to present evidence of a child pornography scandal in the Attorney General's office. She was ordered to report to the Montgomery County, Pennsylvania prison on November 29. Four months after her imprisonment was sanctioned, Kane was disbarred by the supreme court.

== Personal life ==
Kane lived in Clarks Summit, Pennsylvania, with her husband Chris Kane, an executive and co-owner in his family's trucking and warehouse company. They have two sons. She filed for divorce in family court in Lackawanna County, Pennsylvania, on December 26, 2014.

In October 2014, Kane said she was suffering from a concussion she sustained in a car crash.

In March 2022, she was arrested for driving under the influence (DUI) after a two-car collision involving her car about 3 miles from her house in Scranton. She failed a field sobriety test and refused to take a breathalyzer test. She then checked herself into addiction recovery center for 45 days, after which she was incarcerated since the DUI represented a violation of her probation conditions. In May 2022, after she admitted violating her probation, a judge revoked her probation and ordered her into treatment.

== Electoral history ==
Pennsylvania Attorney General election, 2012, Democratic Primary
Party	Candidate	Votes	%
Democratic	Kathleen Kane	375,500	52.82
Democratic	Patrick Murphy	335,438	47.18
Total votes		710,938	100.00

Pennsylvania Attorney General election, 2012
Party	Candidate	Votes	%
Democratic	Kathleen Kane	3,125,557	56.14
Republican	David Freed	2,313,506	41.56
Libertarian	Marakay Rogers	128,140	2.30
Total votes		5,567,203	100.00
Democratic gain from Republican			

== See also ==
- List of female state attorneys general in the United States

Party political offices
Preceded by John Morganelli	Democratic nominee for Attorney General of Pennsylvania; 2012	Succeeded by Josh Shapiro
Legal offices
Preceded by Linda Kelly	Attorney General of Pennsylvania; 2013–2016	Succeeded by Bruce Castor; Acting
