= McGroarty =

McGroarty is a surname. Notable people with the surname include:

- Chris McGroarty (born 1981), Scottish footballer
- Jimmy McGroarty (born 1957), Northern Irish footballer
- John S. McGroarty (1862–1944), American poet and politician
- Rutger McGroarty (born 2004), American ice hockey player
- Stephen Joseph McGroarty (1830–1870), Irish American soldier
- Tom McGroarty, American politician
