= 2012 Pennsylvania Attorney General election =

- November 6, 2012
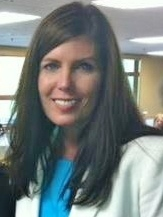

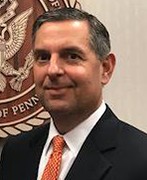
Nominee	Kathleen Kane	David Freed
Party	Democratic	Republican
Popular vote	3,125,557	2,313,506
Percentage	56.1%	41.6%
- Kane: 50–60% 60–70% 70–80% 80–90% >90% Freed: 40–50% 50–60% 60–70%
Attorney General before election
Linda L. Kelly
Republican
Elected Attorney General
Kathleen Kane
Democratic

The 2012 Pennsylvania Attorney General election was held on November 6, 2012. The primary election was held on April 24.

Kane became the first Democrat and the first woman to be elected Attorney General of Pennsylvania. She later resigned in 2016 due to an e-mail scandal, and Solicitor General Bruce Castor became acting Attorney General.

== Republican primary ==
=== Candidates ===
==== Nominee ====
- David Freed, Cumberland County District Attorney

==== Withdrew ====
- John Rafferty, state senator

==== Declined ====
- Linda Kelly, incumbent Attorney General

=== Results ===
Republican primary results
Party	Candidate	Votes	%
Republican	David J. Freed	659,077	100.0%
Total votes		659,077	100.0%

== Democratic primary ==
=== Candidates ===
==== Nominee ====
- Kathleen Kane, prosecutor, former Lackawanna County assistant district attorney

==== Eliminated in primary ====
- Patrick Murphy, former U.S. Representative (2007–2011)

==== Withdrew ====
- Dan McCaffery, former Philadelphia assistant district attorney

==== Declined ====
- Lynne Abraham, former Philadelphia district attorney (1991–2010)

=== Results ===
Democratic primary results
Party	Candidate	Votes	%
Democratic	Kathleen Kane	375,500	52.82%
Democratic	Patrick Murphy	335,438	47.18%
Total votes		710,938	100.0%

== General election ==
=== Results ===
2012 Pennsylvania Attorney General election
Party	Candidate	Votes	%	±%
Democratic	Kathleen Kane	3,125,557	56.14%	+10.44%
Republican	David Freed	2,313,506	41.56%	−10.82%
Libertarian	Marakay Rogers	128,140	2.30%	+0.38%
Total votes		5,567,203	100.0%	
Democratic gain from Republican				

==== By congressional district ====
Kane won 13 of the 18 congressional districts, including eight that elected Republicans.

District	Kane	Freed	Representative
1st	83%	16%	Bob Brady
2nd	90%	9%	Chaka Fattah
3rd	48%	49%	Mike Kelly
4th	45%	52%	Jason Altmire
4th	45%	52%	Scott Perry
5th	47.8%	48.4%	Glenn Thompson
6th	50%	47%	Jim Gerlach
7th	50%	49%	Pat Meehan
8th	51%	47%	Mike Fitzpatrick
9th	46%	51%	Bill Shuster
10th	45%	53%	Tom Marino
11th	50%	48%	Lou Barletta
12th	50%	47%	Mark Critz
12th	50%	47%	Keith Rothfus
13th	68%	31%	Allyson Schwartz
14th	72%	25%	Mike Doyle
15th	52%	46%	Charlie Dent
16th	49.0%	48.7%	Joe Pitts
17th	62%	36%	Tim Holden
17th	62%	36%	Matt Cartwright
18th	49%	48%	Tim Murphy
