= David Freed (attorney) =

American lawyer (born 1970)

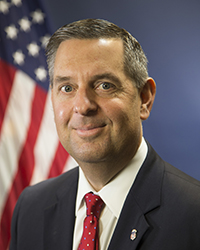

United States Attorney for the Middle District of Pennsylvania
- In office November 27, 2017 – January 1, 2021
- President: Donald Trump
- Preceded by: Peter Smith
- Succeeded by: Bruce Brandler (acting)

Personal details
- Born: July 30, 1970 (age 56)
- Party: Republican
- Spouse: Amy
- Children: 3
- Education: Washington and Lee University (BA); Pennsylvania State University, Carlisle (JD)

David Joseph Freed (born July 30, 1970) is an American lawyer who served as the United States Attorney for the Middle District of Pennsylvania from 2017 to 2021. Prior to assuming that role, he was the District Attorney of Cumberland County, Pennsylvania.

In September 2017, he was nominated by President Donald Trump to become the next United States Attorney for the United States District Court for the Middle District of Pennsylvania, a position to which he was confirmed on November 15, 2017. As U.S. Attorney, he controversially announced that several mail-in ballots had been discarded in a Pennsylvania election office in September 2020. The announcement was considered out of protocol, and intended to undermine public confidence in the 2020 election (which President Donald Trump had frequently claimed without evidence would be rigged against him). Shortly after Freed's announcement, it was revealed that the ballots had been mistakenly discarded by a temp worker.

Freed announced his resignation in December 2020.

== Early life and education ==
Freed grew up in Camp Hill, Cumberland County, Pennsylvania. He graduated from Camp Hill High School in 1988. He earned his Bachelor of Arts, cum laude, at Washington and Lee University in Lexington, Virginia. He earned a Juris Doctor from Dickinson School of Law of Penn State University.

== Law career ==
After graduating from law school, Freed worked in a private practice focusing on insurance defense litigation. In 1997, he became Deputy Prosecutor of York County. In 1998, he became an Assistant District Attorney of Cumberland County.

In 2006, he was appointed District Attorney after incumbent M.L. Skip Ebert Jr. was elected judge within the Cumberland County Court of Common Pleas. Freed was elected in 2007 and re-elected in 2011 without any opposition.

=== 2012 election for PA Attorney General ===
Freed sought and won the Republican nomination for Pennsylvania Attorney General unopposed, after State Senator John Rafferty withdrew from the race. He lost to Democrat Kathleen Kane, a former Assistant D.A. of Lackawanna County, in the fall general election.

=== U.S. Attorney ===
On November 15, 2017, Freed was confirmed by the United States Senate via a voice vote as the U.S. Attorney for the Middle District of Pennsylvania, a nomination that was supported by both of Pennsylvania's U.S. Senators, Democrat Bob Casey Jr. and Republican Pat Toomey. He was sworn in on November 27, 2017.

In September 2020, Freed's office issued a public announcement that nine military mail-in ballots had been disposed in the trash at a Pennsylvania election office. The announcement specifically mentioned that seven of the votes had been cast for Trump. The decision to publicly disclose that nine ballots had been discarded was outside normal protocol, leading to concerns that Freed's office was stoking conspiracies about election fraud and seeking to undermine public confidence in the 2020 election. At the time, President Donald Trump had repeatedly made baseless claims that there would large-scale fraud in the 2020 election against his re-election. It was later revealed that a temp worker at the election office had mistakenly discarded the ballots.

After Donald Trump lost the 2020 presidential election, Freed announced his resignation.

== Personal life ==
Freed lives in Camp Hill, Pennsylvania, with his wife and three children.

== Electoral history ==
Pennsylvania Attorney General election, 2012
Party	Candidate	Votes	%
Democratic	Kathleen Kane	3,073,007	56.1
Republican	David Freed	2,280,989	41.6
Libertarian	Marakay Rogers	126,534	2.3
Total votes		5,480,530	100.0
Democratic gain from Republican			

Party political offices
Preceded by Tom Corbett	Republican nominee for Attorney General of Pennsylvania; 2012	Succeeded by John Rafferty Jr.
