= Peter J. Smith (attorney) =

American attorney

United States Attorney for the Middle District of Pennsylvania
- In office June 28, 2010 – October 1, 2016
- President: Barack Obama
- Preceded by: Dennis Pfannenschmidt (acting)
- Succeeded by: David Freed

Personal details
- Born: November 6, 1940 (age 85) Wilkes-Barre, Pennsylvania
- Party: Democratic
- Education: Georgetown University School of Law J.D.

Peter J. Smith (born November 6, 1940) is an American attorney who served as the United States Attorney for the Middle District of Pennsylvania from 2010 to 2016.
