= William H. Ryan Jr. =

American lawyer

Chairman of the Pennsylvania Gaming Control Board
- Incumbent
- Assumed office August 19, 2011
- Preceded by: Gregory C. Fajt

Attorney General of Pennsylvania Acting
- In office January 18 – May 27, 2011
- Governor: Tom Corbett
- Preceded by: Tom Corbett
- Succeeded by: Linda Kelly

District Attorney of Delaware County
- In office January 5, 1988 – January 9, 1996
- Preceded by: John Reilly
- Succeeded by: Pat Meehan

Personal details
- Party: Republican
- Spouse: Debra
- Children: 2
- Education: Saint Joseph's University; Villanova University Law School
- Profession: Attorney, politician

William H. Ryan Jr. is an American politician and attorney who served as the acting Attorney General of Pennsylvania from January through May 2011. On August 19, 2011, he was appointed to a three-year term as the fourth Chairman of the Pennsylvania Gaming Control Board by Governor Tom Corbett.

== Education ==
Ryan is a graduate of Saint Joseph's University and Villanova University Law School.

== Legal career ==
He assumed the office of Attorney General when Tom Corbett resigned to take office as Governor of Pennsylvania. Before this he was first deputy Attorney General and also previously served as the District Attorney for Delaware County. He has worked in the Attorney General's office since 1997. Ryan served as Attorney General until his nominated successor, Linda Kelly, was confirmed by the State Senate.

== Personal life ==
He lives in Delaware County, and is married with two sons.

Legal offices
Preceded by Gregory C. Fajt	Chairman of the Pennsylvania Gaming Control Board; 2011–2015	Succeeded by David M. Barasch
Preceded by Tom Corbett	Attorney General of Pennsylvania; Acting; 2011	Succeeded by Linda Kelly
Preceded by John Reilly	District Attorney of Delaware County; 1988–1996	Succeeded by Pat Meehan
