= Office of Disciplinary Counsel v. Kane =

2019 Pennsylvania Supreme Court case disbarring former Attorney General Kathleen Kane

- Court: Supreme Court of Pennsylvania
- Full case name: Office of Disciplinary Counsel v. Kathleen Granahan Kane
- Decided: March 22, 2019

Case history
- Prior actions: Office of Disciplinary Counsel v. Kane, No. 3-2202 (Pa. 2015)
- Related action: Commonwealth of Pennsylvania v. Kathleen Kane

Case opinions
- (1) Article IV, Section 4 of the Constitution of Pennsylvania requires the Attorney General to be admitted to the state bar, but the suspension of their bar license does not remove an incumbent Attorney General from office. (2) Former Attorney General Kathleen Kane is disbarred.
- Majority: Per curiam decision

Office of Disciplinary Counsel v. Kathleen Granahan Kane was a case decided by the Pennsylvania Supreme Court on the constitutional qualifications of the Pennsylvania Attorney General, concerning the requirement for the Attorney General to be a member of the Pennsylvania Bar under Article IV, Section 4 of the Constitution of Pennsylvania.

== Background ==
In March 2014, Attorney General Kathleen Kane closed a corruption investigation into Philadelphia Democratic Party officials. The Committee of Seventy objected, calling for an investigation into Kane's decision.

Public scrutiny intensified when the Philadelphia Daily News published a story accusing Kane's office of leaking sensitive grand jury information. Kane believed former prosecutor Frank Fina orchestrated the story. Kane leaked further grand jury information on cases that Fina led in an effort to embarrass him.

=== Indictment ===
In 2014, a separate grand jury assembled to investigate the leaks from Kane's office. On January 21, 2015, the grand jury recommended Kane's indictment for "perjury, false swearing, official oppression and obstruction of law." Following the grand jury's report, Kane was indicted by Montgomery County District Attorney Risa Vetri Ferman on August 6.

== History ==
On September 21, the Supreme Court of Pennsylvania unanimously ruled to suspend Kane's license to practice law. In the ruling, the Supreme Court noted that the suspension would not remove Kane from office, despite Article IV, Section 4, of the Pennsylvania Constitution requiring the Attorney General to have a bar license.

=== Separate criminal trial ===
Kane's criminal trial began on August 8, 2016. On August 15, she was convicted on all charges, including perjury, obstruction, official oppression, and conspiracy.

=== Disbarment ===
On March 22, 2019, Kathleen Kane formally surrendered her law license and was disbarred by the Supreme Court of Pennsylvania. In the unsigned per curiam decision, the Supreme Court noted that Kane "could not successfully defend against the charges" if she had not resigned her license. She was later disbarred by the United States District Court for the Middle District of Pennsylvania in July 2019.
