= Camp Hill High School =

Public school in Pennsylvania, United States

Coordinates: 40.2383°N 76.9260°W

- 100 S 24th St. Camp Hill, PA

Information
- School type: Public
- Established: 1907; 119 years ago
- School district: Camp Hill School District
- CEEB code: 390-525
- Principal: Mark Ziegler
- Teaching staff: 27.30 (FTE)
- Enrollment: 400 (2024–2025)
- Student to teacher ratio: 14.65
- Colors: Navy blue, white
- Team name: Lions
- Rival: Trinity High School
- Website: highschool.camphillsd.k12.pa.us

Camp Hill High School is a coeducational public high school located in Camp Hill, Pennsylvania. It is part of the Camp Hill School District and is the smallest public high school in Cumberland County. It is located approximately 10 minutes from the city of Harrisburg. It was founded in 1907 and has an enrollment of approximately 352 students in ninth through twelfth grades. The High School shares a building with Camp Hill Middle School, although classes, teachers, and even administrators are mostly shared.

== History ==
The school was built after the civil war fostering mostly orphaned boys in a 2-mile radius.

Before the construction of the first building in 1907, the high school shared a building with students from nearby East Pennsboro Township. The historic structure, directly adjacent to the current high school/middle school complex, was completed in 1907, and graduated its first students in 1910. In 1953 the old school was torn down and replaced with a new three-story brick structure located at the corner of Chestnut Street and South 24th Street.

The new school was substantially larger than the old 4-classroom building, with a cafeteria which doubled as a fallout shelter, a gymnasium and locker rooms, and many more classrooms. The school was expanded in 1960 with the addition of music classrooms, a woodworking shop, and a 900-seat auditorium. A new library and instructional media center were added above the main courtyard in 1977. In 2003 a new cafeteria, and building-wide air conditioning were added to the school, and the old cafeteria and the front courtyard were converted into classrooms.

== Extracurriculars ==
The high school offers a variety of clubs, activities and sports. One of the most successful of these teams is the quiz bowl team, which in 2012 won third place in the small schools division of the NAQT High School National Championship tournament.

=== Athletics ===
The school athletic teams participate in District 3 of the Pennsylvania Interscholastic Athletic Association, which governs high school sports for the Commonwealth of Pennsylvania. The school mascot is the Lion. Camp Hill won the state championship in 1999, 2008, and 2009 for baseball, 1988 for football, and 2015 for boys cross country. The 1988 football team was the first PIAA State champs due to the tournament beginning that year. Until 2001, Football games unusually took place on Saturday mornings instead of Friday nights, due to the lack of stadium lighting at Christian Siebert Memorial Park, the home athletic field of the schools' team. Installation of stadium lighting at the field was financed by Coca-Cola, and included an agreement which involved installing vending machines at school district athletic fields and buildings.

Camp Hill has had a strong scholastic wrestling program since 1958, producing two state champions, Bob Cochran in 1976 and Tim Cochran in 1981.

Traditionally, there is a rivalry between Camp Hill High School and nearby Catholic school Trinity High School The two schools compete against each other in basketball, football, soccer, cross-country, track and field, baseball, softball, and tennis. These games are highly attended by fans, spectators, and other members of the community.

The school has enjoyed a successful soccer program. They were District III finalists and PIAA State semifinalists in 2007, 2008, 2009, and 2015. In 2016 the program enjoyed a District III and PIAA State championship.

Camp Hill has a rich history in cross country. The girls team captured District III championships in 1975, 1976, 1977, 1979, 2017, 2018, and 2019. The boys team were District III champions in 2013, 2014, 2015, and 2016, tying the school record for the most consecutive team district championships in any girls or boys sport in Camp Hill history. The boys team won the PIAA State Championship in 2015.

== Notable alumni ==
- Park Dietz, (class of 1966), forensic psychologist
- David Freed, (class of 1988), U.S. Attorney for the Middle District of Pennsylvania
- John Hopper, (class of 1941), Pennsylvania State Senator from 1977 to 1992
- William Daniel Phillips, (class of 1966), winner of the 1997 Nobel Prize in Physics; a bronze plaque is installed in the auditorium lobby to commemorate his award
- James R. Shepley, (class of 1935), journalist and president of Time Inc. from 1969 to 1980
- David Freed (attorney), American lawyer who served as the United States Attorney for the Middle District of Pennsylvania from 2017 to 2021
- James S. Forrester, American cardiologist whose research led to three major advancements in the practice of cardiology

== See also ==
- Camp Hill School District
