= Tom McGroarty =

American mayor

Thomas McGroarty

Mayor of Wilkes-Barre, Pennsylvania
- In office January 2, 1996 – January 5, 2004
- Preceded by: Lee Namey
- Succeeded by: Tom Leighton
- Constituency: Luzerne County, Pennsylvania

Personal details
- Party: Democratic
- Spouse: Joanne McGroarty
- Children: Jordan McGroarty

Thomas McGroarty is an American Democratic Party politician who served as the mayor of the city of Wilkes-Barre, Pennsylvania, from 1996 to January 5, 2004.

== Political career ==
In 1983, McGroarty was elected to Wilkes-Barre City Council and served for twelve years before his election as mayor.

=== Mayorship ===
McGroarty served as the twenty-second mayor of the City of Wilkes-Barre. He took his mayoral oath of office just after midnight on January 2, 1996, surprising the outgoing mayor.

McGroarty was elected mayor in 1995 and re-elected in 1999. He was the only mayor to be elected both as a Democrat and Republican, having waged a successful write-in campaign as a Republican in 1995. By securing both nominations, McGroarty enjoyed relationships with both Democratic and Republicans officials.

McGroarty expanded city services in each of the city's twelve neighborhoods. But his main focus became emergency preparedness and recovery, as a result of a blizzard and significant flooding in his first month in office. McGroarty met President William J. Clinton at the White House and hosted the President during a tour of Wilkes-Barre on February 16, 1996. During his visit, President Clinton announced federal funding for the Wyoming Valley Levee Raising Project, which provided flood protection. Long after McGroarty's departure, those same levees, enhanced on his watch, protected Wilkes-Barre in September 2011, when river levels were 42.66 feet, 1.75 feet above the flood level of Hurricane Agnes.

== Personal life ==
McGroarty was from Wilkes-Barre's East End and was born on December 22, 1962. McGroarty graduated from Coughlin High School, Luzerne County Community College, and Bloomsburg University. He was both an officer and enlisted member of the 109th Field Artillery, where he served as service battery commander.

== Quotes ==
- "I don't know what to expect next, maybe a volcano eruption," quoted by The New York Times when major flooding hit parts of the Northeast which included Wilkes-Barre, about three weeks after the mayor took office.

Preceded by Lee Namey	Mayor of Wilkes-Barre; 1996–2004	Succeeded by Thomas M. Leighton
