= Linda L. Kelly =

American lawyer

Attorney General of Pennsylvania
- In office May 27, 2011 – January 15, 2013
- Nominated by: Tom Corbett
- Preceded by: Tom Corbett (Note: William Ryan served as acting Attorney General from January (when Corbett was inaugurated as governor) until Kelly's nomination was confirmed by the State Senate.)
- Succeeded by: Kathleen Kane

United States Attorney for the Western District of Pennsylvania
- In office April 28, 2001 – September 18, 2001
- Nominated by: George W. Bush
- Preceded by: Harry Litman
- Succeeded by: Mary Beth Buchanan
- In office August 1, 1997 – October 22, 1998
- Nominated by: Bill Clinton
- Preceded by: Frederick Thieman
- Succeeded by: Harry Litman

Personal details
- Born: Linda Lee Kelly; May 20, 1949 (age 77)
- Party: Republican
- Spouse: Paul
- Education: University of Pittsburgh; Duquesne University School of Law
- Profession: Attorney, politician

Linda Lee Kelly (born May 20, 1949) is an American attorney who served as the attorney general of Pennsylvania from 2011 to 2013.

== Education ==
Kelly is a graduate of Elizabeth Forward High School, the University of Pittsburgh and the Duquesne University School of Law.

== Legal career ==
Kelly was an assistant district attorney in Allegheny County; she also served twice as an acting U.S. Attorney, in 1997–98 and again in 2001. She was nominated by Governor Tom Corbett to be his permanent successor as Attorney General of Pennsylvania in February 2011, and was unanimously confirmed by the Pennsylvania Senate on May 23, 2011. Kelly was the first woman to serve as state attorney general since Anne Alpern left office in 1961.

== Personal life ==
Kelly and her husband Paul have one daughter, Kate.

== See also ==
- List of female state attorneys general in the United States

Legal offices
Preceded by Tom Corbett^{1}	Attorney General of Pennsylvania; 2011–2013	Succeeded by Kathleen Kane
Notes and references
1. William Ryan succeeded Corbett as acting attorney general until Kelly was sworn in.
