= 2012 Pennsylvania elections =

- November 6, 2012
- Registered: 8,508,015
- Turnout: 67.6%

Elections were held in Pennsylvania on November 6, 2012. Necessary primary elections were held on April 24.

All 203 seats of the Pennsylvania House of Representatives, 25 seats of the Pennsylvania Senate, as well as the offices of Pennsylvania Treasurer, Pennsylvania Auditor General, and Pennsylvania Attorney General were up for election.

== Presidential election ==
=== Democratic primary ===
As the incumbent president, Barack Obama faced token opposition in the primary election. President Obama cemented his status as the Democratic presumptive nominee on April 3, 2012, by securing the minimum number of pledged delegates needed to clinch the nomination, thus making the Pennsylvania Democratic presidential primaries a non-factor in the nomination.

=== Republican primary ===
Although Texas Congressman Ron Paul, former Speaker of the House Newt Gingrich, former Pennsylvania Senator Rick Santorum, and former Massachusetts Governor Mitt Romney all appeared on the ballot, Romney had all but secured the Republican nomination by the time of the Pennsylvania primaries. Though Romney had not yet clinched the minimum number of delegates needed to secure the nomination, Gingrich, Santorum, and Paul were too far behind in the delegates count to mount a serious comeback, and had subsequently stopped actively campaigning.

== Pennsylvania General Assembly ==
See: Pennsylvania House of Representatives elections, 2012 and Pennsylvania Senate elections, 2012.

== Federal elections ==
- United States Senate election in Pennsylvania, 2012
- United States House of Representatives elections in Pennsylvania, 2012
