= Thomas M. Leighton =

American politician

Tom Leighton
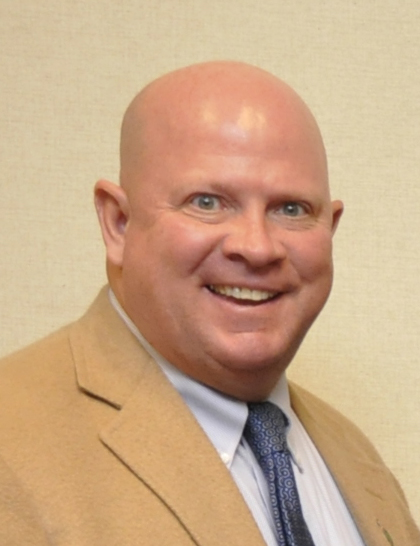

Mayor of Wilkes-Barre, Pennsylvania
- In office January 5, 2004 – January 4, 2016
- Preceded by: Tom McGroarty
- Succeeded by: Anthony George
- Constituency: Luzerne County, Pennsylvania

Personal details
- Party: Democratic
- Spouse: Patty Leighton
- Children: Kelly, Tom Jr., and Courtney

Thomas M. "Tom" Leighton is an American politician. He served as the mayor of the city of Wilkes-Barre, Pennsylvania from 2004 to 2016. Mayor Leighton was the first mayor under the city's Home Rule Charter to be popularly elected to three consecutive terms.

== Political career ==
Thomas Leighton is an American politician. A Democrat, he served as the mayor of the city of Wilkes-Barre, Pennsylvania, from 2004 to 2016. Mayor Leighton was the first mayor under the city's Home Rule Charter to be popularly elected to three consecutive terms. Leighton defeated former city leader Tom McGroarty in the Democratic Party primary election in 2003, partly on a platform to revitalize Wilkes-Barre's downtown sector.

On June 9, 2005, Leighton unveiled his "I believe..." campaign for Wilkes-Barre, which was intended to boost the city's spirits and rid residents of their cyncisim and negativity about the city. Construction is complete on a planned downtown 14-screen theatre complex and a two-floor Barnes & Noble bookstore. The movie theater opened in July 2006. A Barnes & Noble bookstore opened in early October 2006. New street lights have replaced worn out red lights in the Public Square and in parts of the downtown area.

Preceded by Tom McGroarty	Mayor of Wilkes-Barre; January 5, 2004–January 2016	Succeeded by Anthony George
