= David Freed (author) =

American author, educator, journalist and screenwriter

- Born: David Freed; December 4, 1954 (age 71); Albany, Georgia
- Citizenship: American
- Education: Colorado State University Harvard University
- Occupation: Author
- Awards: Pulitzer Prize (1993)
- Website: David Freed

David Freed (born December 4, 1954, in Albany, Georgia) is an American author, educator, journalist and screenwriter. Freed has written on criminal justice issues for Los Angeles Times. Freed shared the 1993 Pulitzer Prize for Spot News Reporting with fellow writers at the newspaper for reportage on the Rodney King riots in 1992.

Freed wrote a humorous collection of job application letters and rejections in 1997 called "Dear Ernest and Julio: The Ordinary Guy's Search for the Extraordinary Job." Freed is also the author of seven novels in the Cordell Logan series.

== Biography ==
Freed was born in Albany, Georgia and grew up in Colorado. After graduating from Colorado State University in 1976, Freed began his journalism career at the Colorado Springs Sun and the Rocky Mountain News in Denver in the 1980s. Both newspapers are no longer in operation.

Freed is a licensed pilot. Federal Aviation Administration records indicate that he owns a 2002 Cirrus SR20 single-engine aircraft.

== Journalism career ==
=== Los Angeles Times ===
Freed worked as an investigative journalist with the Los Angeles Times in the 1980s and 1990s. He spent time reporting on Operation Desert Storm with assignments in Iraq, Kuwait and Saudi Arabia. Freed wrote a series of articles starting in 1990 that highlighted flaws in Los Angeles County's criminal justice system, including overcrowded county jails and poor enforcement of lesser crimes. This series made Freed a finalist for the Pulitzer Prize for Public Service. Freed shared the 1993 Pulitzer Prize for Spot News Reporting with fellow staff writers at the newspaper for reportage on the Rodney King riots in 1992.

=== The Atlantic ===
In the May 2010 issue of The Atlantic, Freed reported on the plight of scientist Steven Hatfill who was investigated extensively by the Federal Bureau of Investigation (FBI) following anthrax attacks in 2001. Freed's article, "The Wrong Man," told the story of the FBI's efforts to track down individuals responsible for mailing anthrax powder to targets throughout the United States. Hatfill was targeted due to his work with the Medical Research Institute of Infectious Diseases, his use of an antibiotic called Cipro useful in fending off anthrax and faulty investigating done by consultant Donald Wayne Foster. After six years of investigations and court proceedings, the FBI settled with Hatfill for $5.8 million after a U.S. District Court judge found no evidence that Hatfill was responsible for the anthrax attacks. Freed's account of the FBI investigation included extensive interviews with Hatfill, who had not provided his account with any publication prior to 2010. The article was one of the feature writing finalists for the 2011 National Magazine Awards from the American Society of Magazine Editors.

=== Smithsonian Air & Space ===
Since 2011, when he wrote about fractional luxury jet ownership, Freed has been a regular contributor of feature-length stories for the magazine of the National Air and Space Museum, covering a broad range of topics. In August 2012, he wrote about Curiosity, NASA's Mars rover. In December 2014, after a trip to Hanoi, Freed produced a story exploring what the Vietnam War was like for North Vietnamese soldiers who shot down American warplanes using Russian-built SA-2 rockets. SA The Missile Men of North Vietnam In 2016, he was named a contributing editor to the magazine.

=== Investigative Reporters and Editors, Inc. 'Arizona Project' ===
Following the assassination in June 1976 of Arizona Republic investigative reporter Don Bolles, Freed became a member of a team of reporters known as the "Desert Rats" that convened in Phoenix to carry on Bolles' work.

== Literary career ==
Freed, under the pseudonym Fred Grimes, wrote a humor book titled Dear Ernest and Julio: The Ordinary Guy's Search for the Extraordinary Job. The nonfiction work, published by St. Martin's Press in 1998, featured a series of application letters for odd jobs sent to real employers by Freed. Each letter details an unusual talent, skill set or anecdote that attracted a response from the recipient.

Freed has also written mystery-thriller novels centered on a protagonist named Cordell Logan: Flat Spin (2012), Fangs Out (2013), Voodoo Ridge (2014), The Three-Nine Line (2015), Hot Start (2016) and The Kill Circle (2017). In each novel, Logan, a retired military assassin and fighter pilot-turned-flight instructor, is tasked with solving a new mystery. The first six Cordell Logan novels originally were published by The Permanent Press. Blackstone Publishing has since acquired the rights to the Logan books, including a seventh book in the series, Deep Fury, which was released in December 2024.

In addition, Freed has written screenplays in Hollywood, including "The Devil Came on Horseback" and "A Glimpse of Hell" starring James Caan and Robert Sean Leonard which, at the time, was the highest rated program in the history of FX Networks.

== Teaching and honors ==
Freed is a former adjunct professor in the Department of Journalism and Media Communications at Colorado State University, Fort Collins. He is a member of the University's Media Hall of Fame and in 2018 was named by the CSU Alumni Association as the College of Liberal Arts' Distinguished Alumnus. He holds a master's degree in extension studies from Harvard University and also teaches creative writing as an instructor at Harvard Extension School.

=== Non-fiction ===
- Dear Ernest and Julio: The Ordinary Guy's Search for the Extraordinary Job (1997): Under the assumed name Fred Grimes, Freed collects amusing responses from employers to a series of humorous application letters for unusual jobs.

=== Cordell Logan series ===
- Flat Spin (2012): Logan assists his ex-wife in hunting down the murderer of her new husband.
- Fangs Out (2013): Logan is asked to investigate a murder involving a defense contractor accused of killing the daughter of a Vietnam War hero in Fangs Out.
- Voodoo Ridge (2014): Logan leads a team to search the Sierra Nevada Mountains for a crashed plane with valuable cargo.
- The Three-Nine Line (2015): Logan is sent to Vietnam, where two former prisoners of war are being held under house arrest, accused of killing a brutal former guard from the infamous Hanoi Hilton.
- Hot Start (2016): Logan investigates the murders of a big game hunter and his wife.
- The Kill Circle (2017): Logan is reluctantly drawn from his civilian pilot training school to investigate the deaths of three retired CIA analysts.
- Deep Fury (2024): Logan investigates the murder of his former Air Force wingman.
