= List of mayors of Wilkes-Barre, Pennsylvania =

Mayor of Wilkes-Barre, Pennsylvania
- Incumbent; George Brown since January 6, 2020
- Term length: 4 years
- Inaugural holder: Ira M. Kirkendall
- Formation: June 1871
- Website: https://www.wilkes-barre.city/mayors-office

This is a list of mayors of Wilkes-Barre, Pennsylvania, a city in the northeastern part of the U.S. state of Pennsylvania.

#	Name	Term start	Term end	Political Party
1	Ira M. Kirkendall	June 1871	June 1874	Democrat
2	Michael Kearney	June 1874	February 1877	Republican
3	William W. Loomis	April 1877	April 1880	Republican
4	Thomas Broderick	April 1880	February 1886	Democrat
5	Charles B. Sutton	April 1886	April 1892	Republican
6	Francis M. Nichols	April 1892	April 1902	Republican
7	Charles H. Price	April 1902	April 1905	Republican
8	Frederick C. Kirkendall	April, 1905	April, 1908	Democrat
9	Lewis P. Kniffen	April 1908	December 1911	Republican
10	John V. Kosek	December 1911	January 1920	Democrat
11	Daniel L. Hart	January 1920	February 1933	Democrat
12	Charles N. Loveland	April 1933	January 1944	Republican
13	Con McCole	January 1944	January 1948	Democrat
14	Luther M. Kniffen	January 1948	January 1960	Republican
15	Frank Slattery	January 1960	January 1968	Democrat
16	John V. Morris	January 1968	January 1970	Republican
17	John B. McGlynn	January 1970	January 1972	Democrat
18	Con "Firpo" Salwoski	January 1972	January 1976	Democrat
19	Walter Lisman	January 1976	January 1980	Democrat
20	Thomas McLaughlin	January 1980	January 1988	Democrat
21	Lee Namey	January 1988	January 1996	Democrat
22	Thomas D. McGroarty	January 1996	January 2004	Democrat
23	Thomas Leighton	January 2004	January 2014	Democrat
24	Anthony George	January 2014	January 6, 2020	Democrat
25	George Brown	January 6, 2020	Present	Democrat

== Buildings named after Wilkes-Barre mayors ==
- A restaurant in the Rolling Mill Hill section of Wilkes-Barre was named "The Hart" in honor of former mayor Daniel Hart. The restaurant closed in and was sold at Sheriff Sale in 2009.
- The John B. McGlynn Learning Center, located in the Boulevard Townhomes on Wilkes-Barre Boulevard, was founded in 1988. The learning center, was named in McGlynn's honor. John B. McGlynn served as Wilkes-Barre's 17th mayor, and did so from 1970 to 1972.
