= Harper Polling =

American polling and media company

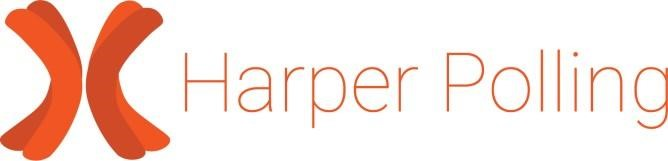
- Type: Private
- Industry: Opinion polling
- Founded: Harrisburg, Pennsylvania (2012)
- Founder: Brock McCleary
- Headquarters: York, Pennsylvania, United States
- Key people: Brock McCleary, owner
- Website: www.HarperPolling.com

Harper Polling is an American public opinion research firm specializing in polling and survey research for political campaigns, advocacy groups, and corporate clients.

== Overview ==
The organization was founded after the 2012 presidential election, with the goal of giving Republicans high-volume, inexpensive "robo-polling." The organization was founded by Brock McCleary, who had served as the polling director of the NRCC in the 2012 cycle. The organization was founded with the goal of emulating PPP, a left-leaning polling organization. Harper Polling has received some backlash for not being able to call cellphones. McCleary has been described as a "polling guru" and in 2022 was recognized as one of the top 50 political consultants in Pennsylvania.

In 2020, Harper Polling was acquired by market research firm Cygnal. Harper Polling reestablished itself as an independent entity in June of 2025, again under the leadership of founder Brock McCleary.

== Polling topics ==
Harper Polling correctly polled the 2013 Senate special election in Massachusetts. Harper has also polled the 2014 Pennsylvania Lieutenant Governor race and the 2014 Pennsylvania gubernatorial election.

In addition to polling elections, Harper Polling also polls for issues. Harper Polling partnered with PPP to conduct polling across 29 states to test support for the Gang of Eight's immigration reform bill.
