= Pat Toomey =

American businessman and politician (born 1961)

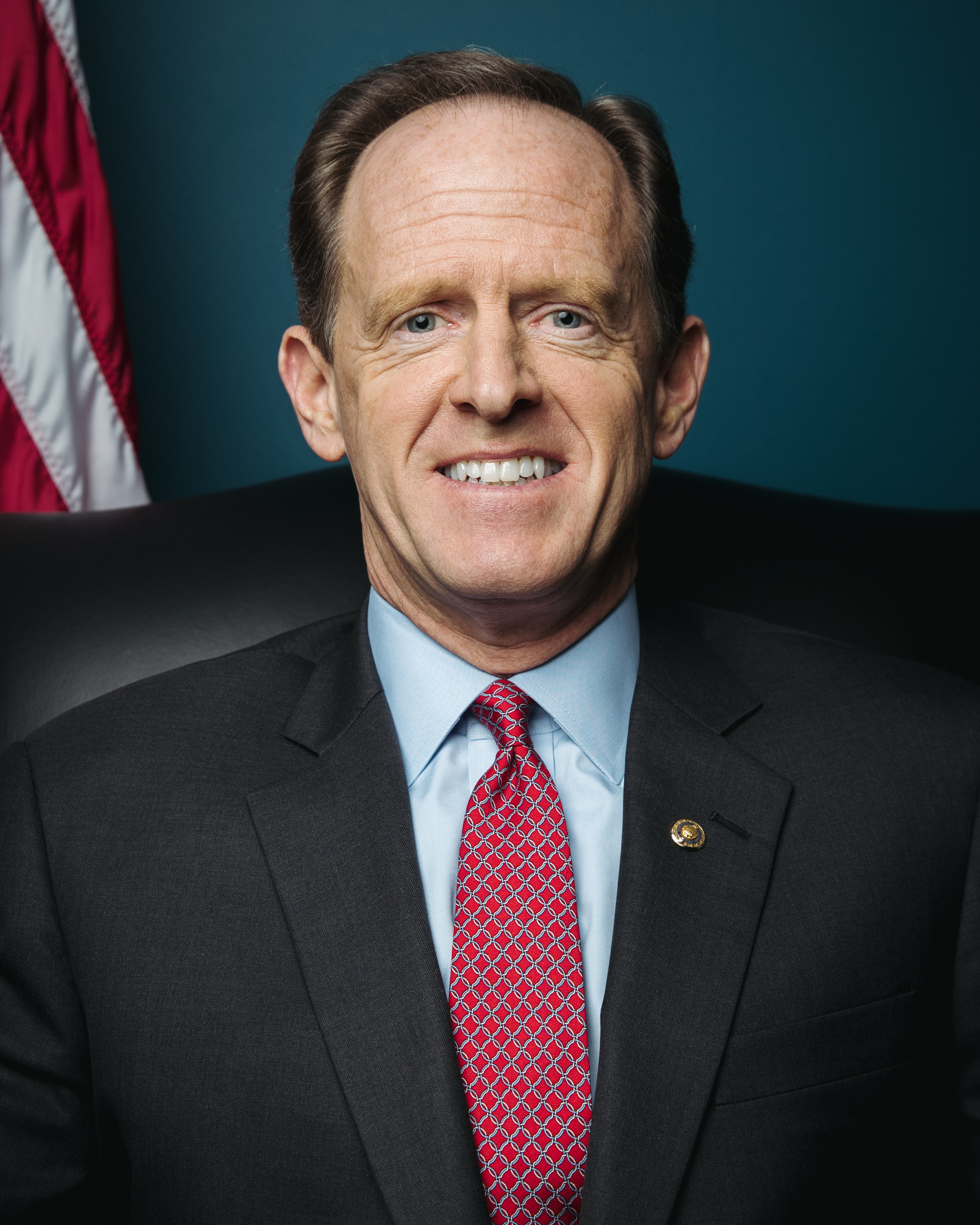
- Official portrait, 2018

Ranking Member of the Senate Banking Committee
- In office January 3, 2021 – January 3, 2023
- Preceded by: Sherrod Brown
- Succeeded by: Tim Scott

United States Senator from Pennsylvania
- In office January 3, 2011 – January 3, 2023
- Preceded by: Arlen Specter
- Succeeded by: John Fetterman

Member of the U.S. House of Representatives from Pennsylvania's 15th district
- In office January 3, 1999 – January 3, 2005
- Preceded by: Paul McHale
- Succeeded by: Charlie Dent

Personal details
- Born: Patrick Joseph Toomey Jr. November 17, 1961 (age 64) Providence, Rhode Island, U.S.
- Party: Republican
- Spouse: Kris Duncan (m. 1997)
- Children: 3
- Education: Harvard University (BA)
- Toomey's voice Toomey defends Pennsylvania's Electoral College votes on the Senate floor. Recorded January 6, 2021

Patrick Joseph Toomey Jr. (born November 17, 1961) is an American businessman and politician who served as a United States senator from Pennsylvania from 2011 to 2023. A member of the Republican Party, he served three terms as the U.S. representative for Pennsylvania's 15th congressional district, from 1999 to 2005.

Of mixed Irish Catholic and Azorean descent, Toomey graduated from Harvard College. A former Wall Street banker, Toomey narrowly lost the Republican primary for United States Senate in 2004. From 2005 to 2009, he served as president of the Club for Growth. Toomey won the Republican primary for the 2010 U.S. Senate election in Pennsylvania, and was elected to the seat after defeating the Democratic nominee, former U.S. Navy three-star admiral and congressman Joe Sestak, in the general election. He was reelected to the Senate in 2016, defeating Democratic nominee Katie McGinty.

On October 5, 2020, Toomey announced that he would not run for reelection to a third Senate term in 2022. On February 13, 2021, Toomey was one of seven Republican senators to vote to convict Donald Trump of incitement of insurrection in his second impeachment trial. After leaving office, Toomey joined the board of Apollo Global Management.

== Early life and education ==
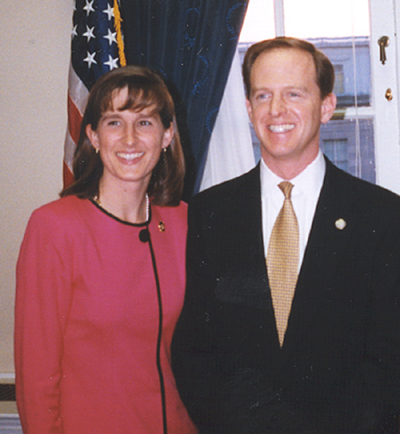
Toomey and his wife Kris Toomey in 1999

Toomey was born on November 17, 1961, in Providence, Rhode Island, the third of six children of Catholic parents, Mary Ann (née Andrews) of East Providence and Patrick Joseph Toomey of Providence. His father was of Irish descent and his mother of Portuguese ancestry. His mother's grandparents were all born in the Azores. His father was a union worker who laid cable for the Narragansett Electric Company, and his mother worked as a part-time secretary at St. Martha's Catholic Church.

Toomey was a member of the Boy Scouts of America and attained the organization's highest rank, Eagle Scout. He attended La Salle Academy on a scholarship, where he participated in the Close Up Washington civic education program and graduated as valedictorian. He then attended Harvard College, where he graduated with a B.A. in government in 1984.

== Early career ==
After graduation, Toomey was hired by Chemical Bank, where he was involved in currency swap transactions. In 1986, he was hired by Morgan, Grenfell & Co., where he dealt in multiple foreign currencies, interest rates, and currency-related derivatives.

In 1991, Toomey resigned from Morgan, Grenfell after it was acquired by Deutsche Bank. He later said he resigned out of concern that Deutsche Bank would impose a less flexible and entrepreneurial work environment. The same year, Toomey and two younger brothers, Steven and Michael opened Rookie's Restaurant in Allentown, Pennsylvania.

In 1994, Toomey was elected to Allentown's newly established Government Study Commission. During his term, he drafted a new charter for the commission requiring a supermajority for any tax increase and established a split-roll tax system that levied taxes on land at higher rate than taxes on buildings. Allentown voters approved the charter on April 23, 1996.

== U.S. House of Representatives ==
=== Elections ===
1998

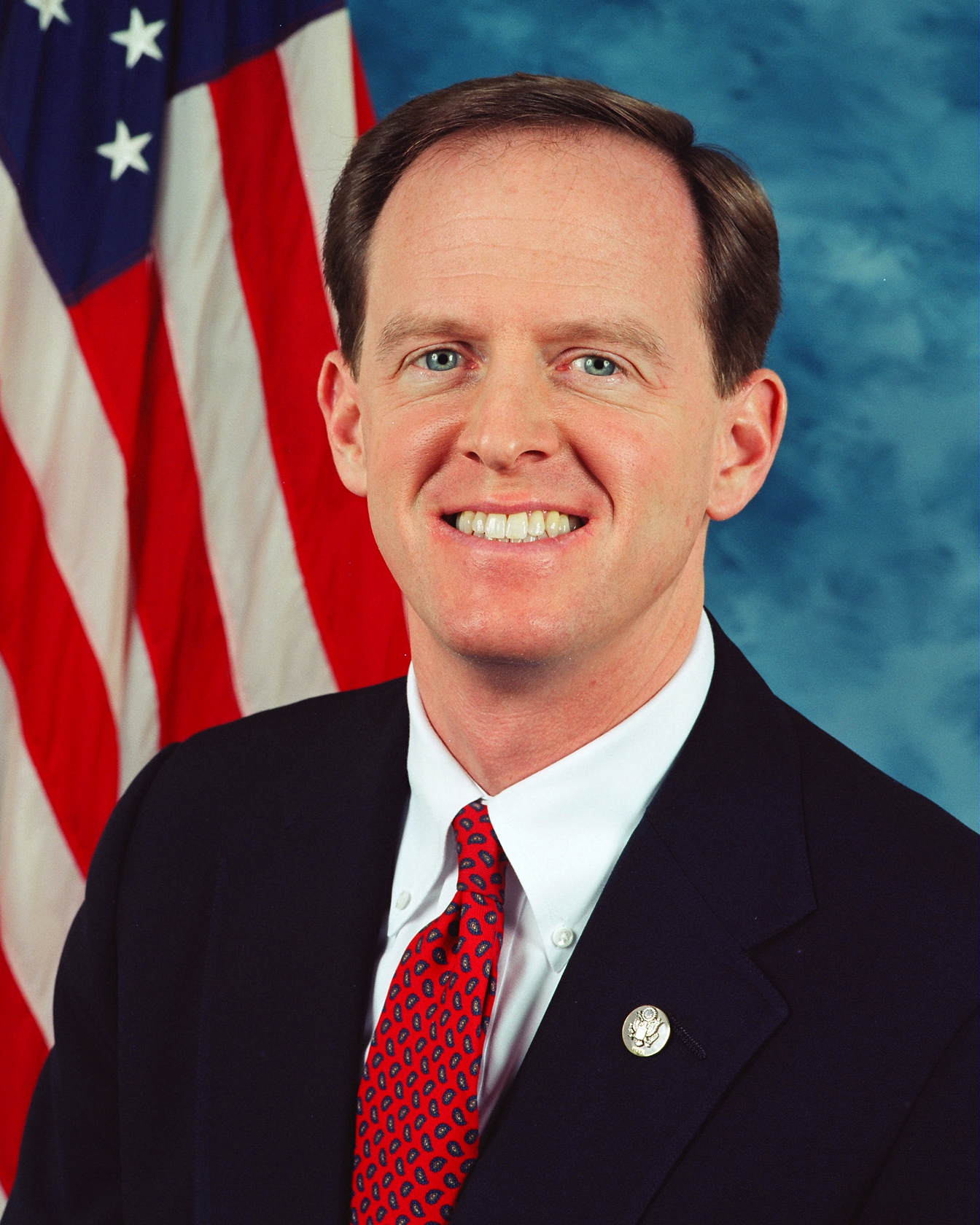
Toomey during the 108th Congress

In 1998, Toomey ran for the Pennsylvania's 15th congressional district, based in the Lehigh Valley region of eastern Pennsylvania, after Democratic incumbent U.S. Representative Paul McHale decided to retire. Toomey won the six-candidate Republican primary with 27% of the vote.

In the general election, Toomey faced state Senator Roy Afflerbach, a former Pennsylvania State Representative. During the campaign, Toomey criticized the agenda of the Clinton-Gore administration, especially its plans to modify the Internal Revenue Service. He said the plan did not "address the real fundamental problems plaguing American taxpayers" and said the IRS should be abolished.

Later in the campaign, Toomey and Afflerbach debated the effectiveness of a flat tax-based system, an issue on which they sharply disagreed. Toomey promised to serve no more than three terms if elected. He defeated Afflerbach, 55%–45%.

2000

Toomey was reelected to a second term, defeating Ed O'Brien, president of the Bethlehem, Pennsylvania-based United Steelworkers Local 2598, 53%–47%. He won Lehigh County with 54% and Northampton County with 51%.

2002

Toomey was reelected to a third term, defeating O'Brien again, 57%–43%. He won Lehigh County with 58% and Northampton County, with 54%.

2004

In accordance with his 1998 pledge not to serve more than three terms in the House, Toomey did not run for reelection in 2004. He decided to challenge incumbent Republican U.S. Senator Arlen Specter in the primary instead. He lost the primary by a narrow margin.

=== Tenure ===
Toomey served as the U.S. representative for Pennsylvania's 15th congressional district from 1999 to 2005. In the House, he distinguished himself as a fiscal expert. He pushed to decrease government spending and to set aside money for debt reduction.

In 2001, Toomey proposed a budget that would cut taxes worth $2.2 trillion over ten years, exceeding Bush's $1.6 trillion plan.

In 2002, Toomey voted in favor of the Iraq Resolution which authorized military action against Iraq.

Toomey strongly opposed Bush's plan for comprehensive immigration reform, saying "I think it's a slap in the face for the millions of people throughout the world who decide to take the effort to legally enter our country." He was a longtime supporter of creating Medicare Part D, but said he would not vote for it unless it lowered costs and guaranteed competition between government and private insurers.

In January 1999, Toomey was named to the House Budget Committee.

== U.S. Senate ==
=== Elections ===
==== 2004 ====
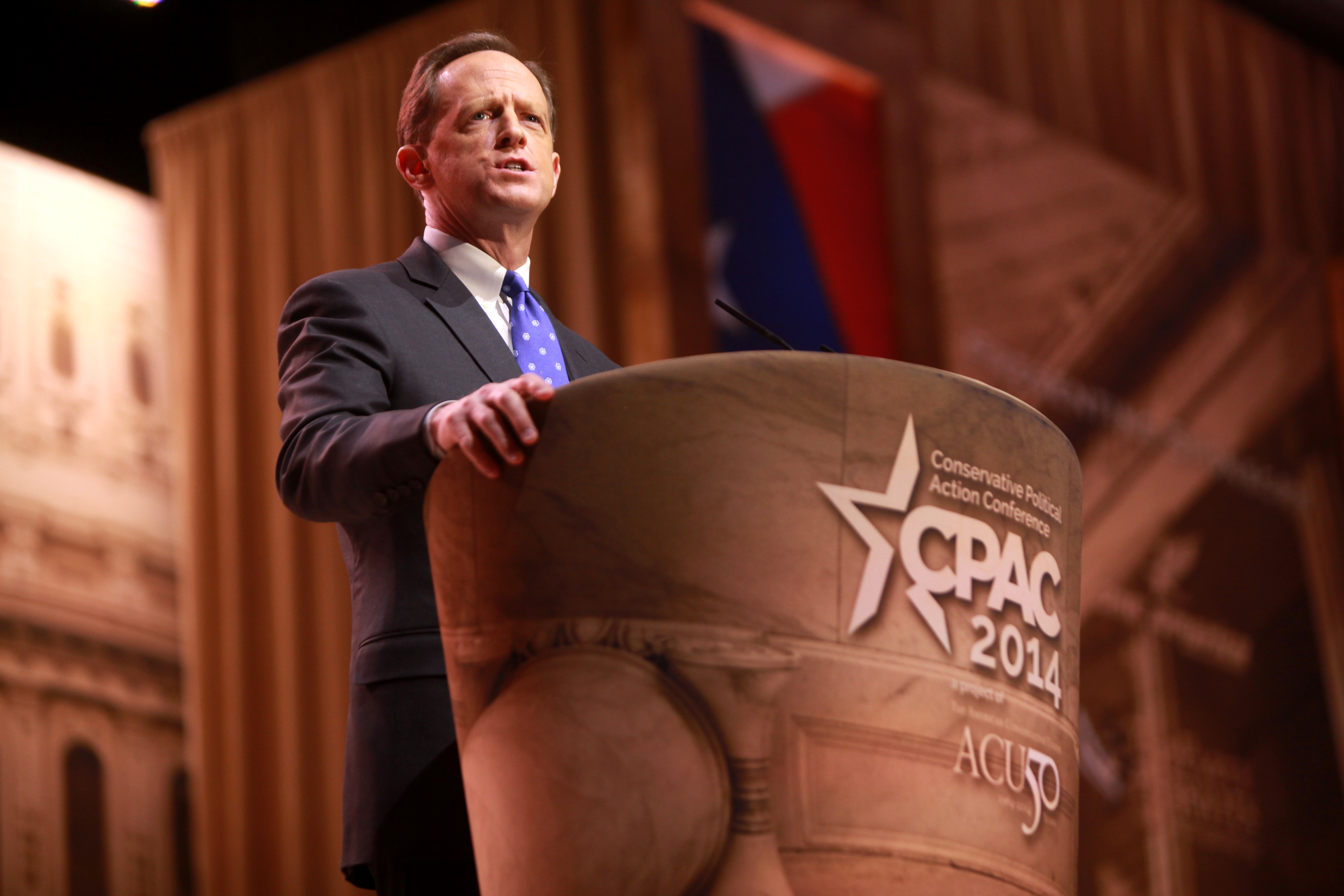
Toomey speaking at the Conservative Political Action Conference in March 2014

In 2004, Toomey challenged longtime incumbent Senator Arlen Specter in the Republican primary election. His campaign was aided by $2 million of advertising from the Club for Growth. Toomey's election campaign theme was that Specter was not a conservative, especially on fiscal issues. Most of the state's Republican establishment including Pennsylvania's other U.S. Senator, Rick Santorum, and President George W. Bush supported Specter. Specter won by 1.6 percentage points, about 17,000 votes out of over one million cast.

==== 2010 ====
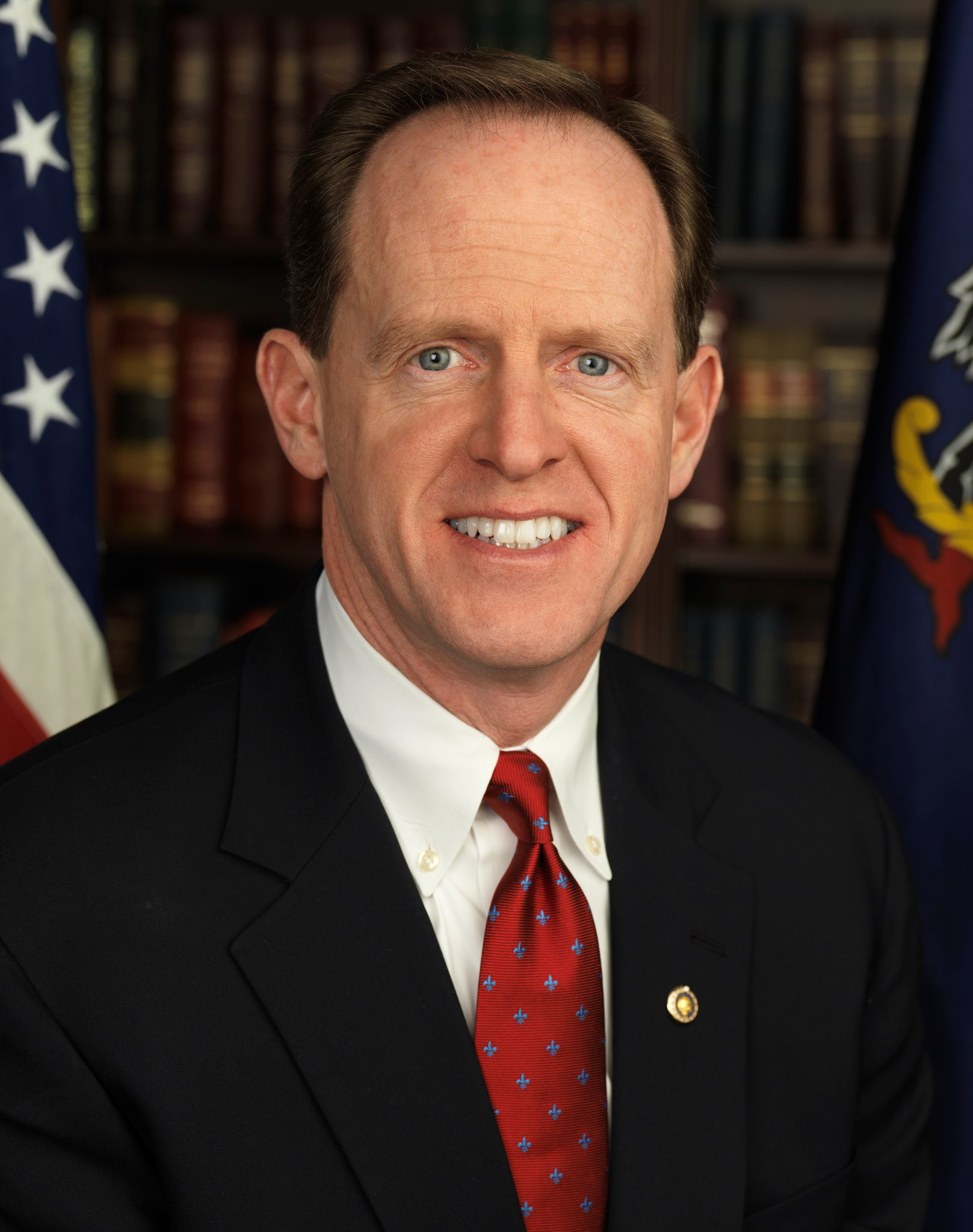
Toomey during the 112th Congress

On April 15, 2009, Toomey announced his intention to again challenge Specter in the 2010 Republican primary.

On April 28, 2009, Specter announced he would switch parties and run as a Democrat, after polls showed him losing to Toomey in the primary. Specter's withdrawal left Toomey as the front-runner for the 2010 Republican nomination. Both primaries were held on May 18, 2010.

Toomey defeated Peg Luksik in the Republican primary, 81%–19%, and Specter lost the Democratic primary, 54%–46% to U.S. Representative Joe Sestak of Delaware County. The general election was spiteful and cost over $50 million including spending by the candidates, political parties, and outside groups. Toomey won 51%–49%, carrying most of the state's counties.

==== 2016 ====
Toomey ran for reelection to the Senate in 2016. He was endorsed by the Club for Growth. He was unopposed in the Republican primary and won the general election with 48.9% of the vote, to Democratic nominee Katie McGinty's 47.2% and Libertarian challenger Ed Clifford's 3.85%.

=== Tenure ===
Toomey was the first Lehigh Valley resident to serve as senator from Pennsylvania since Richard Brodhead in the mid-19th century. He was elected to the United States Senate on November 2, 2010, and his term began on January 3, 2011. He joined the Congressional Hispanic Conference, a caucus of which he was an original member in his days in the House.

On August 11, 2011, Senate minority leader Mitch McConnell named Toomey to the United States Congress Joint Select Committee on Deficit Reduction. The committee's duties included composing a package of spending cuts for submission to both Houses of Congress.

On April 26, 2012, Toomey was selected to chair the United States Senate Steering Committee, a caucus of several Republican senators who collaborate on legislation. He succeeded Senator Jim DeMint, who had previously expressed his intention to transfer the committee's chairmanship to a member of the Republican 2010 Senate class.

On October 6, 2018, Toomey was one of 50 senators (49 Republicans, 1 Democrat) to vote to confirm Brett Kavanaugh to the Supreme Court. Toomey and Senator Bob Casey disagreed on how evidence of sexual assault against Kavanaugh should be handled.

Some activists have criticized Toomey for not meeting frequently enough with his constituents, including never having held an in-person town hall in Philadelphia despite having held at least 47 "teleconference town-hall meetings" with his constituents. These "teleconference town-hall meetings" could have as many as 10,000 people on a single call, and when he has held in-person town-hall meetings Toomey has been accused of having selected the audience.

In February 2019, Toomey was one of 16 senators to vote against legislation preventing a partial government shutdown and containing $1.375 billion for barriers along the U.S.-Mexico border which included 55 miles of fencing.

In March 2019, Toomey was one of 12 Republican senators to cosponsor a resolution that would impose a constitutional amendment limiting the Supreme Court to nine justices. The resolution was introduced after multiple Democratic presidential candidates expressed openness to the idea of expanding the Supreme Court.

On June 5, 2019, Toomey recognized the 20th anniversary of the SMART Congressional Initiative.

On April 17, 2020, Senate Majority Leader Mitch McConnell appointed Toomey to the COVID-19 Congressional Oversight Commission to oversee the implementation of the CARES Act.

On October 4, 2020, Toomey was reported to be retiring at the conclusion of his term, forgoing a reelection campaign or a run for governor in 2022. He confirmed the report the next day.

Committee assignments

- Committee on Banking, Housing, and Urban Affairs
  - Subcommittee on Financial Institutions and Consumer Protection (chairman)
  - Subcommittee on Housing, Transportation, and Community Development
  - Subcommittee on Securities, Insurance, and Investment
- Committee on the Budget
- Committee on Finance
- Joint Economic Committee
- Joint Select Committee on Deficit Reduction

== Political positions ==
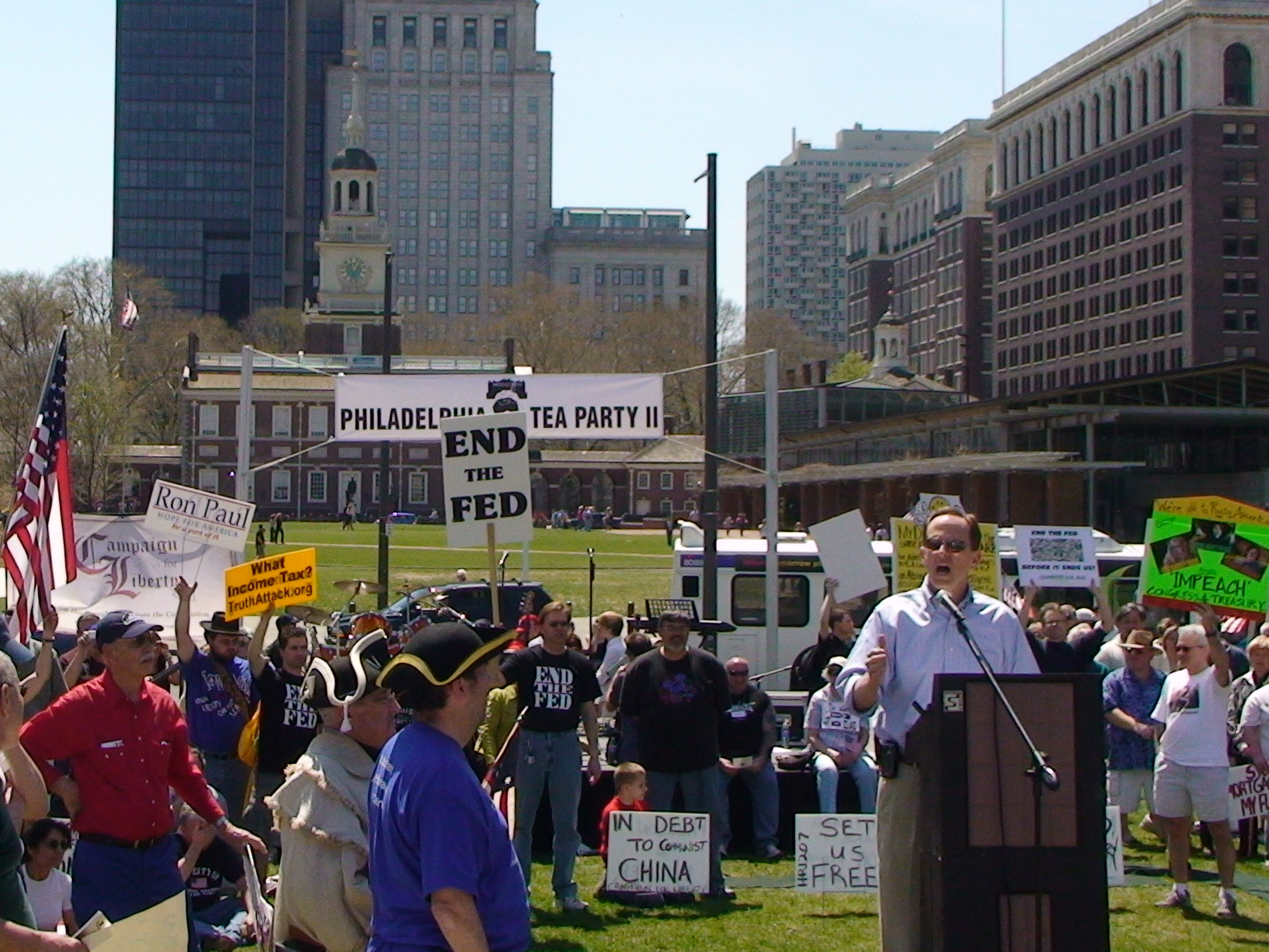
Toomey, as a United States Senate candidate, addresses a Tea Party rally in Philadelphia, on April 18, 2009.

=== Education ===
Toomey has strongly supported increased public spending on charter schools. In 2017, he supported Betsy DeVos as President Trump's pick for secretary of education. At the time of the vote, Toomey's campaigns had received $60,500 from the DeVos family during his career. There were weekly protests at his office and high numbers of calls, faxes, and emails were noted.

=== Environment ===
Toomey rejects that there is a scientific consensus on climate change. In 2010, he said, "I think it's clear that [climate change] has happened. The extent to which that has been caused by human activity I think is not as clear. I think that is still very much disputed and has been debated." In 2011, he voted to limit the Environmental Protection Agency's ability to regulate greenhouse gas emissions. In 2013, he voted for a point of order opposing a carbon tax or a fee on carbon emissions. In 2015, he voted against the Clean Power Plan.

Toomey has a consistent record of voting against environmental interests or supporting them only with limiting provisions. In 2000, he opposed implementing the Kyoto Protocol, an international treaty to curb greenhouse gases. In 2001, he voted against raising corporate average fuel economy standards and providing incentives for alternative fuels. In 2003, he supported the Healthy Forests Initiative, which aimed to combat wildfires by allowing timber harvests in protected forests. In 2014, he supported protecting the Allegheny National Forest, saying, "Congress should ensure that the Forest Service prioritize limited resources to adequately manage the lands for which it is currently responsible, rather continue to acquire additional property." In 2017, he opposed restricting oil drilling and development in the Arctic National Wildlife Refuge.

In a series of roll-call votes attached to debate over the Keystone pipeline on January 21, 2015, Toomey voted against an amendment offered by Brian Schatz expressing the sense of Congress regarding climate change but in favor of a similar amendment offered by John Hoeven.

In July 2021, Toomey said that the data on global warming is not clear enough to justify imposing new regulatory burdens on consumers.

The League of Conservation Voters (LCV) 2021 National Environmental Scorecard gave Toomey a 18% score, with a lifetime score of 7%.

=== Government shutdown ===
In 2013, Toomey was one of 18 senators to vote against the bill to reopen the government during the United States government shutdown of 2013. Of his vote, he said: "The one major redeeming aspect of this bill is that it reopens the government... I cannot support piling hundreds of billions of dollars of debt on current and future generations of Americans without even a sliver of reform to start putting our fiscal house in order."

=== Deregulation ===
Toomey is a strong supporter of banking deregulation. In 2019, The Washington Post reported "10 of his 17 biggest campaign contributors are financial company officials."

Regarding deregulation of the financial services industry, Toomey said in 1999, "The trend in deregulation, beginning in the early 1980s, is one of the biggest reasons for the sustained economic expansion. I would like to see us continue to deregulate on many fronts, including the financial services industry."

While serving on the House Banking Committee, in 1999 Toomey helped write House Resolution 10, which led to the repeal of parts of the Depression-era Glass-Steagall Act. The repeal of the Act which had regulated the separation of banks and investment firms, allowed for companies that combined banking and investment operations.

Toomey was also a supporter of the deregulation of the derivatives market, an area in which he had professional experience, stating that he believed the market to be adequately regulated by banking supervisors and state-level regulators. He pressed the House to pass the Commodity Futures Modernization Act of 2000 because it would "eliminate most of the cloud of legal and regulatory uncertainty that has shadowed" derivatives since their invention. He stated that he hoped that the Senate would modify the bill to "allow greater flexibility in the electronic trading" of over-the-counter derivatives.

Toomey was a leading sponsor of the JOBS Act which passed the Senate in March 2012. The Act would reduce costs for businesses that go public by phasing in SEC regulations for "emerging growth companies" over a five-year period. It would also help startup companies raise capital by reducing some SEC regulations.

Toomey orchestrated legislation to repeal consumer protection measures enacted by the Consumer Financial Protection Bureau which had been intended to prevent auto lenders from discriminating on the basis of race.

=== Gun policy ===
In 2013, in response to the Sandy Hook Elementary School shooting, Toomey and Senator Joe Manchin introduced a bill that would have required a background check for most gun sales. The legislation failed and failed again when it was reintroduced in 2015, and again in 2016 after the mass shooting at an Orlando nightclub. In June 2016, Toomey voted against a bill that would prohibit gun purchases by people on the no-fly list because of concerns that there was no process for those on the no-fly list to seek removal if they were on the list in error. Instead, he sought to find compromise across a number of competing proposals, some partisan, and some bipartisan; none succeeded. After the Stoneman Douglas High School shooting, Toomey renewed his calls for background checks, but a bill never came to vote. Toomey's and Manchin's background check proposal came up again after the Robb Elementary School shooting. The two were part of a bipartisan group of 20 senators working on a "modest" deal for gun control that included a red flag provision, a support for state crisis intervention orders, funding for school safety resources, stronger background checks for buyers under the age of 21, and penalties for straw purchases. That deal later became the Bipartisan Safer Communities Act, which Toomey voted for.

Toomey opposed President Obama's executive orders on gun control as contrary to the constitutional system of checks and balances, but believes Congress should pass background checks. He received nearly $93,000 from gun-rights groups, including the NRA Political Victory Fund (NRA-PVF), who endorsed his 2010 election campaign. His "A" rating fell to a "C" ("poor") in 2016 after he started championing background check legislation.

In a 2022 interview with Face the Nation, Toomey said that Republicans can stay consistent on Second Amendment rights while still supporting gun-control measures like background checks and state red flag laws (with respect to due process), and addressing school safety and mental health issues.

=== LGBT rights ===
In 2004, Toomey said he believes society should give special benefits only to couples who meet the "traditional" definition of marriage as "one man, one woman." That same year, he voted in support of an amendment to the U.S. Constitution to ban same-sex marriage. In 2015, Toomey disagreed with the Supreme Court decision which found that same-sex marriage bans were unconstitutional.

In 2010, Toomey supported the repeal of "Don't ask, don't tell", a policy that banned openly gay or bisexual persons from serving in the military, in a statement made while he was senator-elect.

In November 2013, Toomey proposed an amendment exempting private religious entities from following the Employment Non-Discrimination Act. The amendment failed. After the bill received the 60 votes required for cloture, Toomey cast his vote in support.

Following the cloture vote, Toomey said he had long believed that more legal protections are appropriate to prevent employment discrimination based on sexual orientation, but planned to modify the bill to offer religious groups more "leeway".

=== Healthcare ===
Toomey opposed the passage of the Medicare Prescription Drug Act which he argued was fiscally irresponsible. His 2012 budget proposal called for turning Medicaid into a block grant to states and cutting federal funding for the program in half by 2021, which exceeded even the budget cuts proposed by Paul Ryan.

Toomey opposes the Affordable Care Act (Obamacare) and has supported multiple efforts to dismantle, repeal, or defund it.

Toomey intervened to have Sarah Murnaghan, a 10-year-old girl dying of cystic fibrosis at the Children's Hospital of Philadelphia, moved ahead of other recipients in obtaining a lung transplant, on the grounds that the existing policy reduced access for children. As a 10-year-old, Murnaghan was eligible for transplants only from other children, not from adults leading to a longer waiting time than adult patients. Some doctors said this decision privileged Murnaghan and another child over other recipients, and privileged them above a national policy of allocating organs according to well-established rules. Murnaghan's case resulted in a permanent organ transplant policy change for pediatric patients.

In 2017, as Republicans tried to repeal Obamacare, Toomey said the independent insurance market was in a "death spiral" because of the ACA. Toomey helped write the Republican bill to repeal Obamacare.

On August 7, 2022, Toomey was one of 43 votes against a failed amendment in the Senate that would cap insulin costs at $35 per month.

=== Taxes and government spending ===
Toomey advocates for replacing graduated taxes based with a flat tax based upon income levels. He also favors abolishing the IRS, and has voted to reduce the capital gains tax, eliminate the estate tax, cut small business taxes, eliminate the "marriage penalty", cut federal income taxes and corporate taxes, and expand tax credits.

Toomey publicly opposed the 2009 federal stimulus package. He opposes government-run or subsidized healthcare and farm subsidies.

In 2011, Toomey sponsored a federal balanced budget amendment. He supported extending unemployment benefits and offsetting the cost with reduced government spending in other areas.

In his first term in Congress, Toomey took credit for getting $12 million in earmark spending for businesses in his district. In 2010 he claimed but provided no proof that he eventually ceased getting earmarks as a congressman, when as a Senate candidate he signed the "No Pork" pledge. In December 2011, Toomey and Senator Claire McCaskill introduced the Earmark Elimination Act of 2011. The bill failed and failed again when it was reintroduced in 2014.

In September 2018, Toomey was among six Republican senators who voted against a $854 billion spending bill meant to avoid another government shutdown. The bill included funding for the departments of Defense, Health and Human Services, Labor and Education.

=== Social issues ===
Toomey is anti-abortion. While running for the Senate in 2010, he said he supports legislation to ban abortions and jail sentences for doctors who perform them. As a senator, Toomey voted for a bill that would have banned abortions after 20 weeks with no exceptions for the health of pregnant women and girls and new limits in cases of rape and incest. In January 2020, Toomey also signed an amicus brief urging the US Supreme Court to overturn several of its past rulings protecting abortion rights, including Roe v. Wade. When he first ran for Congress in 1998, Toomey said he believed abortion should be legal only in the first trimester.

Toomey voted to reauthorize the Violence Against Women Act in 2013.

In March 2015, Toomey voted for an amendment to establish a deficit-neutral reserve fund to allow employees to earn paid sick time.

In July 2020, Toomey joined fellow Republican Senator Mitt Romney in condemning Trump's decision to commute Roger Stone's sentence, saying that while Trump "clearly has the legal and constitutional authority to grant clemency for federal crimes," commuting Stone's sentence was a "mistake" due in part to the severity of the charges against him and that "Attorney General Bill Barr stated he thought Mr. Stone's prosecution was 'righteous' and 'appropriate' and the sentence he received was 'fair.'"

=== Immigration ===
Toomey supported Trump's 2017 executive order to impose a ban on entry to the U.S. to citizens of seven Muslim-majority countries.

In February 2019, Toomey was one of 16 senators to vote against legislation preventing a partial government shutdown and containing $1.375 billion for barriers along the U.S.-Mexico border that included 55 miles of fencing. In March 2019, Toomey was one of 12 Republican senators to vote to block Trump's national emergency declaration that would have granted him access to $3.6 billion in military construction funding to build border barriers.

=== Impeachment ===
==== Pennsylvania Supreme Court justices ====
In February 2018, Toomey said that it was worth discussing whether to impeach justices on the Pennsylvania Supreme Court who had ruled that a gerrymandered congressional map violated the Pennsylvania constitution.

==== President Donald Trump ====
In December 2019, Toomey said that it was not worth discussing whether to impeach Trump after he allegedly tried to extort the President of Ukraine, Volodymyr Zelenskyy, by demanding that Zelenskyy start a criminal investigation of Vice President Joseph Biden or at least falsely announce an investigation was underway of Trump's allegation that Biden engaged in corruption in Ukraine. "Where is the crime?" said Toomey at a Republican fundraiser. Earlier Toomey had described Trump's attempt to force Zelenskyy to make false allegations about the Democratic presidential candidate as "errors of judgment". Toomey had harsher words for House Democrats, accusing them of "disgracefully breaking with" bipartisan precedent on impeachment inquiries.

Later that month, the House impeached Trump on multiple charges, including abuse of power in the attempted extortion of Zelenskyy. Even after Trump was impeached, Toomey continued to insist that his offenses were "not impeachable" and opposed hearing from any witnesses at Trump's trial. "We should move as quickly as we can to get this thing over with, get this behind us," Toomey said, adding, "Even if someone believes that everything John Bolton says is going to confirm what's charged in these articles, it's still not impeachable." (The New York Times reported Bolton had written in his forthcoming book that Trump had told him in August 2019 that he wanted to continue freezing the Ukraine aid until officials there helped with investigations into Democrats, including the Bidens.) Along with all but one of the other Republican senators, Toomey voted against convicting Trump on the two articles for which he had been impeached by the House.

On January 9, 2021, Toomey said he thought Trump had performed an impeachable offense for his role in the January 6 United States Capitol attack, but he did not say if he would vote to convict in the Senate. On February 13, 2021, he joined all Democratic senators and six Republicans in voting to convict.

=== Foreign policy ===
In September 2016, Toomey was one of 34 senators to sign a letter to Secretary of State John Kerry advocating that the United States use "all available tools to dissuade Russia from continuing its airstrikes in Syria" from an Iranian airbase near Hamadan "that are clearly not in our interest" and stating that there should be clear enforcement by the US of the airstrikes violating "a legally binding Security Council Resolution" on Iran.

In November 2017, Toomey co-sponsored the Israel Anti-Boycott Act (s. 720), which made it a federal crime for Americans to encourage or participate in boycotts against Israel and Israeli settlements in the West Bank if protesting actions by the Israeli government.

In March 2018, Toomey voted to table a resolution spearheaded by Bernie Sanders, Chris Murphy, and Mike Lee which would have required Trump to withdraw American troops either in or influencing Yemen within the next 30 days unless they were combating Al-Qaeda.

In April 2018, Toomey was one of eight Republican senators to sign a letter to Treasury Secretary Steve Mnuchin and acting Secretary of State John Sullivan expressing "deep concern" over a report by the United Nations exposing "North Korean sanctions evasion involving Russia and China" and asserting that the findings "demonstrate an elaborate and alarming military-venture between rogue, tyrannical states to avoid United States and international sanctions and inflict terror and death upon thousands of innocent people" while calling it "imperative that the United States provides a swift and appropriate response to the continued use of chemical weapons used by President Assad and his forces, and works to address the shortcomings in sanctions enforcement."

On August 10, 2020, Toomey, along with 10 other U.S. individuals, was sanctioned by the Chinese government for "behaving badly on Hong Kong-related issues".

=== Trade ===
In January 2018, Toomey was one of 36 Republican senators to sign a letter to Trump requesting that he preserve the North American Free Trade Agreement by modernizing it for the economy of the 21st century.

In November 2018, Toomey was one of 12 Republican senators to sign a letter to Trump requesting that the United States-Mexico-Canada Agreement be submitted to Congress by the end of the month to allow a vote before the end of the year; they were concerned that "passage of the USMCA as negotiated will become significantly more difficult" in the incoming 116th United States Congress.

=== January 6 United States Capitol attack ===
On May 28, 2021, Toomey abstained from voting on the creation of an independent commission to investigate the January 6 United States Capitol attack.

=== Veterans ===
In 2022, Toomey was among the 11 senators who voted against the Honoring our PACT Act of 2022 (a bill that provided funding for research and benefits for up to 3.5 million veterans exposed to toxic substances during their service).

== Personal life ==
In November 1997, Toomey married Kris Ann Duncan. The couple has three children, Bridget, Patrick Toomey Jr, and Duncan. After leaving the Senate in 2023, Toomey joined the board of Apollo Global Management.

== Electoral history ==
Pennsylvania's 15th congressional district: results, 1998–2002
Year	Democratic	Votes	Pct	Republican	Votes	Pct
1998	Roy Afflerbach	66,930	45%	Patrick J. Toomey	81,755	55%
2000	Edward O'Brien	103,864	47%	Patrick J. Toomey (incumbent)	118,307	53%
2002	Edward O'Brien	73,212	43%	Patrick J. Toomey (incumbent)	98,493	57%

2004 United States Senate Republican primary election in Pennsylvania
Party	Candidate	Votes	%	±%
Republican	Arlen Specter (incumbent)	530,839	50.82	
Republican	Pat Toomey	513,693	49.18	

2010 United States Senate Republican primary election in Pennsylvania
Party	Candidate	Votes	%	±%
Republican	Pat Toomey	667,614	81.5	
Republican	Peg Luksik	151,901	18.5	

2010 United States Senate election in Pennsylvania
Party	Candidate	Votes	%	±%
Republican	Pat Toomey	2,028,945	51.01%	−1.61%
Democratic	Joe Sestak	1,948,716	48.99%	+7.00%
Majority		80,229	2.02%	
Total votes		3,977,661	100.0	
Republican gain from Democratic		Swing		

2016 United States Senate election in Pennsylvania
Party	Candidate	Votes	%	±%
Republican	Pat Toomey (inc.)	2,951,702	48.77%	−2.24%
Democratic	Katie McGinty	2,865,012	47.34%	−1.65%
Libertarian	Edward T. Clifford III	235,142	3.89%	N/A
Total votes		6,051,941	100.00%	
Republican hold		Swing	NA	

Non-profit organization positions
Preceded by Stephen Moore	President of the Club for Growth; 2005–2009	Succeeded by Chris Chocola
U.S. House of Representatives
Preceded by Paul McHale	Member of the U.S. House of Representatives from Pennsylvania's 15th congressional district 1999–2005	Succeeded by Charlie Dent
Party political offices
Preceded by Arlen Specter	Republican nominee for U.S. Senator from Pennsylvania (Class 3); 2010, 2016	Succeeded by Mehmet Oz
Preceded by Jim DeMint	Chair of the Senate Republican Steering Committee; 2012–2015	Succeeded by Mike Lee
U.S. Senate
Preceded by Arlen Specter	U.S. Senator (Class 3) from Pennsylvania; 2011–2023; Served alongside: Bob Casey	Succeeded by John Fetterman
Preceded by Sherrod Brown	Ranking Member of the Senate Banking Committee; 2021–2023	Succeeded by Tim Scott
U.S. order of precedence (ceremonial)
Preceded by Rick Santorum as Former U.S. Senator	Order of precedence of the United States as Former U.S. Senator	Succeeded by Saxby Chambliss as Former U.S. Senator
