= 2008 United States presidential election in Pennsylvania =

- November 4, 2008
- Turnout: 68.6% (▼0.3 pp)

Nominee	Barack Obama	John McCain
Party	Democratic	Republican
Home state	Illinois	Arizona
Running mate	Joe Biden	Sarah Palin
Electoral vote	21	0
Popular vote	3,276,363	2,655,885
Percentage	54.49%	44.17%

Obama
40–50%
50–60%
60–70%
70–80%
80–90%
90–100%
McCain
40–50%
50–60%
60–70%
70–80%
80–90%
90–100%
Tie
President before election
George W. Bush
Republican
Elected President
Barack Obama
Democratic

The 2008 United States presidential election in Pennsylvania was part of the 2008 United States presidential election, which took place on November 4, 2008, throughout all 50 states and the District of Columbia. Voters chose 21 representatives, or electors, to the Electoral College, who voted for president and vice president.

Pennsylvania was won by Democratic nominee Barack Obama by a 10.32% margin of victory. Prior to the election, all 17 news organizations considered this a state Obama would win, or otherwise considered as a safe blue state. Although the Commonwealth of Pennsylvania had voted for the Democratic presidential nominee in every election since 1992, the margins of victory had become smaller over the past elections, as was highlighted in 2004 when John Kerry won Pennsylvania by a slim margin of 2.50%. Since George W. Bush came relatively close to winning the state in 2004, and because Obama had lost the Democratic primary to Hillary Clinton by nearly 10% in April 2008, many analysts believed that Republican presidential nominee John McCain had a decent shot at winning Pennsylvania in the general election.

Nevertheless, Pennsylvania remained blue and gave Obama 54.49% of the vote to McCain's 44.17%, a margin of 10.32%. It was the first time since 1996 in which Pennsylvania was the most Republican of the three Rust Belt swing states (including Wisconsin and Michigan). As of the 2024 election, this is the last time that the counties of Berks, Cambria, Carbon, and Elk voted for a Democrat in a presidential election.

== Democratic primary ==
The Democratic primary was held on April 22. Voters also chose the Pennsylvania Democratic Party's candidates for various state and local offices.

The Democratic primary was open to registered Democrats only. Polls opened at 7am and closed at 8pm. Senators Barack Obama and Hillary Clinton were the only candidates on the ballot for president of the United States. The primary was considered to be a "must win" for Clinton, who defeated Obama, but by a smaller margin than hoped for.

Hillary Clinton won the primary by 9.28%, a wider margin than expected than recent polls suggested, but smaller than most January and February polls. Despite her victory, she gained only nine delegates on Obama. In particular, superdelegates were not swinging in her direction after her win; the Clintons had been trying to secure the support of Congressman Jason Altmire, but he remained uncommitted after she won his district by 31% during the primary.

=== Delegates ===
The Pennsylvania Democratic Party sent 187 delegates to the 2008 Democratic National Convention. Of those delegates, 158 were pledged, and 29 were unpledged. All of the 158 pledged delegates were allocated (pledged) to vote for a particular candidate at the National Convention according to the results of the Pennsylvania presidential primary. The 29 unpledged delegates were popularly called "superdelegates" because their vote represented their personal decisions, whereas the regular delegates' votes represented the collective decision of many voters. The superdelegates were free to vote for any candidate at the National Convention and were selected by the Pennsylvania Democratic Party's officials.

The 158 pledged delegates were further divided into 103 district delegates and 55 statewide delegates. The 103 district delegates were divided among Pennsylvania's 19 congressional districts, and were allocated to the presidential candidates based on the primary results in each district. The 55 statewide delegates were divided into 35 at-large delegates and 20 party leaders and elected officials (abbreviated PLEOs). They were allocated to the presidential candidates based on the preference of the delegates at the State Committee meeting on June 7.

Of the 29 unpledged delegates, 26 were selected in advance and 3 were selected at the State Committee meeting. The delegates selected in advance were 13 Democratic National Committee members, the 11 Democratic U.S. representatives from Pennsylvania, Democratic U.S. Senator Bob Casey Jr., and Democratic Governor Ed Rendell.

=== Importance of Pennsylvania ===
The primary was the first time since 1976 that Pennsylvania played a major role in a presidential nomination.

==== Importance of Pennsylvania for Clinton ====
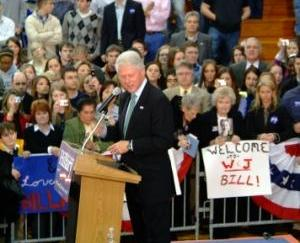
Former president Bill Clinton at a "Solutions for America" rally at the Henry Memorial Center at Washington & Jefferson College on March 11, 2008

As the race continued to Pennsylvania, Indiana, and North Carolina, many observers had concluded that Clinton had little chance to overcome Obama's lead in pledged delegates.

Former President Bill Clinton highlighted the importance of the state for the Clinton campaign saying on March 11 at an event in Western Pennsylvania, "If she wins a big, big victory in Pennsylvania, I think it'll give her a real big boost going into the next primaries ... I think she's got to win a big victory in Pennsylvania. I think if she does, she can be nominated, but it's up to you." This was a repetition of his tactic before March 4, warning supporters that his wife might not be able to continue if she did not win Ohio and Texas. Hillary Clinton emphasized that Pennsylvania was something of a home state for her, as her father came from Scranton, she and her brothers were christened there and had vacationed near there each summer, and her brothers still maintained the family cottage near there.

==== Importance of Pennsylvania to Obama ====
On March 18, 2008, Barack Obama chose Philadelphia as the site to deliver his much-anticipated "A More Perfect Union" speech dealing with the race and the controversy surrounding his pastor, Rev. Jeremiah Wright.

=== Campaign ===
==== Obama's "Road to Change" bus tour ====
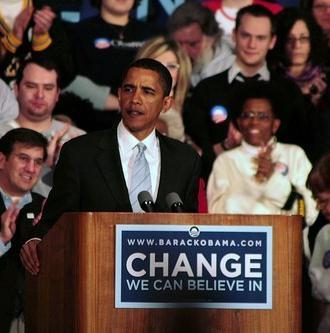
Obama speaking at a rally in Pittsburgh to kick off his statewide bus tour.

Obama took a six-day "Road to Change" bus tour across Pennsylvania, with stops in Pittsburgh, Johnstown, Altoona, State College, and Harrisburg.

On March 28, Obama started the bus tour with a rally in Pittsburgh's Soldiers and Sailors Memorial Hall. Obama was introduced and endorsed by Senator Bob Casey Jr., who had indicated earlier that he would remain neutral in the Democratic primary.

Casey traveled to Florida over the Easter holiday, where he said rain forced him to stay inside and think about the election. Obama's ability to "transcend" the racial divide and his ability to engage younger voters proved decisive to his decision. According to sources, Casey's four daughters lobbied their dad to endorse Obama.

On March 29, the Obama bus tour stopped at the Pleasant Valley Recreation Center in Altoona, where he famously bowled a 37. Both Obama and Casey (who rolled a score of 71) lost to local homemaker Roxanne Hart, who rolled a score of 82. On April Fools' Day, Clinton jokingly challenged Obama to a "bowl-off," with the winner taking all the delegates.

=== Controversy ===
On April 11, 2008, Huffington Post blogger Mayhill Fowler, a self-admitted Obama supporter, reported that during an April 6 "closed press" fundraising event in San Francisco, California, Obama recounted the obstacles facing his campaign in the Pennsylvania primary as it pertained to rural, white voters. Fowler wrote that during the speech, Obama said the following:

You go into these small towns in Pennsylvania and, like a lot of small towns in the Midwest, the jobs have been gone now for 25 years and nothing's replaced them ... And they fell through the Clinton Administration, and the Bush Administration, and each successive administration has said that somehow these communities are gonna regenerate and they have not. And it's not surprising then they get bitter, they cling to guns or religion or antipathy to people who aren't like them or anti-immigrant sentiment or anti-trade sentiment as a way to explain their frustrations.

Fowler later posted a three-minute 30 second audio snippet confirming the accuracy of the remark. Senators Clinton and John McCain both issued statements condemning the remarks. Obama later defended his comments, but conceded: "I didn't say it as well as I should have." However, he also added: "I said something that everybody knows is true." Obama had addressed similar themes of guns, religion, and economics in 2004 during an interview with Charlie Rose.

=== Final week ===
On the last Friday before the primary, Obama spoke on Independence Mall in Philadelphia, Pennsylvania, to a crowd of more than 35,000, the largest audience yet drawn by either candidate during the campaign. The crowd was nearly twice what had been projected, and spilled over into nearby streets. The next day, Obama conducted a whistle stop train tour from Philadelphia to Harrisburg, drawing a crowd of 6,000 at a stop in Wynnewood and 3,000 at a stop in Paoli. On Monday, Obama held the final events of his Pennsylvania campaign in Scranton, McKeesport, and the University of Pittsburgh's Petersen Events Center.

The Saturday before the primary, Clinton spoke in five Pennsylvania cities, including West Chester and York, Pennsylvania. More than 300 people showed up at the West Chester firehouse to hear her speak. At the Wilson high gymnasium in West Lawn, Pennsylvania, Clinton told several hundred more supporters: "The job of a leader is to bring people together to solve problems . . . to understand that sometimes we have to fight to get the political will and the votes to make that happen". On Monday, April 21, Senator Clinton along with husband Bill Clinton spoke to a crowd of 6,000 in Downtown Pittsburgh. Other events were held Monday in Scranton, Harrisburg, and Philadelphia. Both candidates refused to participate in the political custom of street money.

=== Polls ===
Public opinion polling from early January 2007 through mid-February 2008 consistently gave Clinton a double digit lead over Obama. By the beginning of April, polls of Pennsylvanians showed Obama trailing Clinton by an average of 5 points. According to 2 polls taken one day before the primary, Clinton was leading Obama by 49%–42% and 51%–41%. Other polls showed Clinton leading by an average of about 6%.

Some superdelegates also announced their preferred candidates before the primary. As of April 30, 16 superdelegates had announced support for Clinton, and 5 had announced support for Obama.

=== Results ===
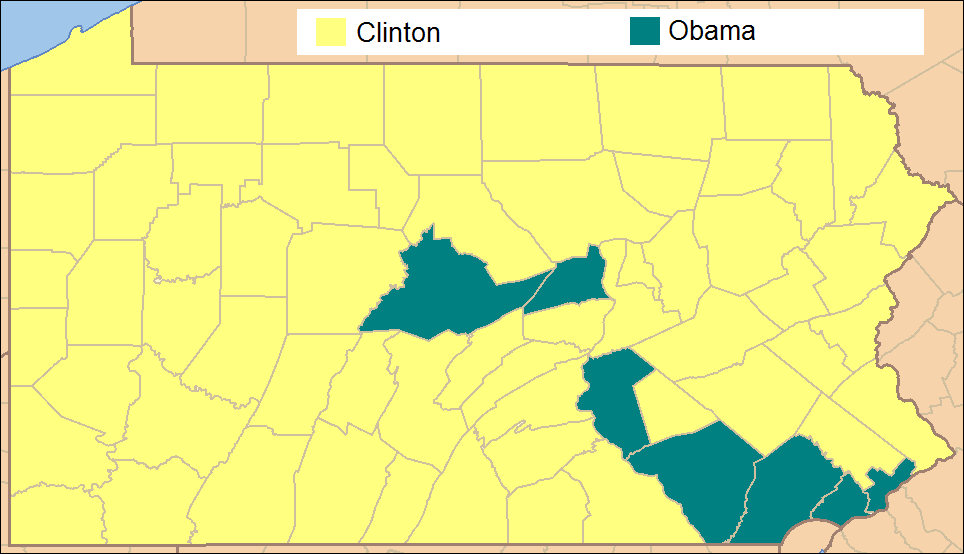

Primary date: April 22, 2008

National pledged delegates determined: 158

Pennsylvania Democratic presidential primary, 2008 Official results
Candidate	Votes	Percentage	Estimated national delegates
Hillary Clinton	1,275,039	54.57%	85
Barack Obama	1,061,441	45.43%	73
Totals	2,336,480	100.0%	158

== Republican primary ==
The Republican primary was also held on April 22, and voters also chose the Pennsylvania Republican Party's candidates for various state and local offices.

Polls opened at 7:00 am and closed at 8:00 pm. John McCain was the winner. He had already been declared the presumptive Republican presidential nominee, having secured enough delegate votes in earlier primary contests to win the nomination at the 2008 Republican National Convention.

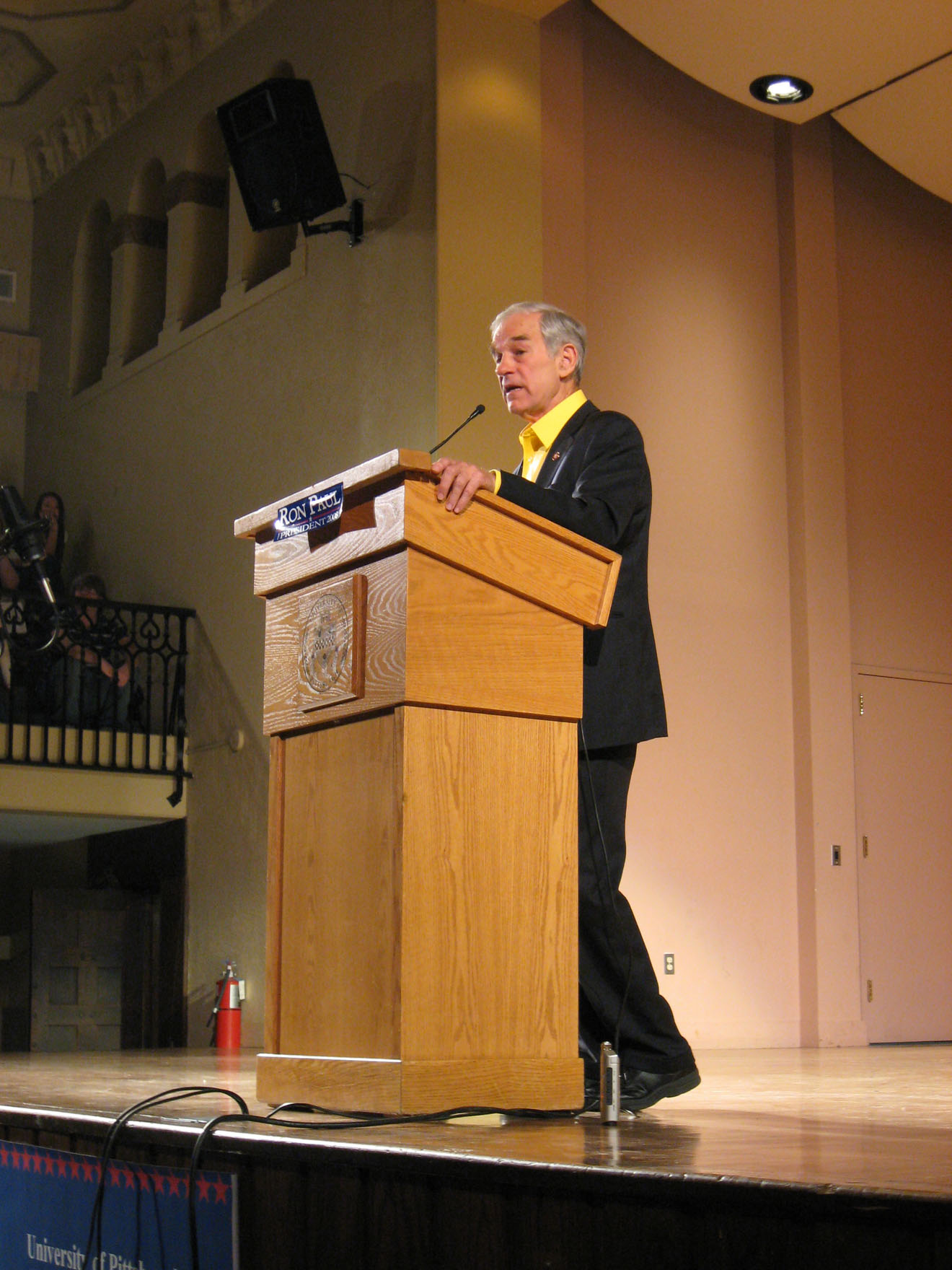
Ron Paul delivers a speech at the University of Pittsburgh on April 3, 2008.

Unlike on the Democratic side, little campaigning took place as John McCain had already clinched the nomination. Outsider candidate Ron Paul made several stops in the state, including his birthplace of Pittsburgh.

Official results
Candidate	Votes	Percentage	Delegates
John McCain	594,061	72.86%	74*
Ron Paul	129,246	15.85%	0
Mike Huckabee*	92,057	11.29%	0
Total	815,364	100%	74

*Delegates are essentially unpledged in the Pennsylvania Republican primary.

Some media sources noted that Ron Paul and Mike Huckabee combined took in around 220,000 votes (about 27% of the vote), despite McCain's status as presumptive nominee and the statistical irrelevance of Pennsylvania, as a possible sign of continuing social conservative or libertarian unease with McCain's nomination and have speculated about whether these results could potentially affect McCain in the November general election. Some strategists disputed this theory, pointing to low turnout among McCain supporters and arguing that primary results would not necessarily influence the November election.

== Campaign ==
=== Predictions ===
There were 16 news organizations who made state-by-state predictions of the election. Here are their last predictions before election day:

Source	Ranking
D.C. Political Report	Likely D
Cook Political Report	Lean D
The Takeaway	Lean D
Electoral-vote.com	Lean D
Washington Post	Lean D
Politico	Lean D
RealClearPolitics	Lean D
FiveThirtyEight	Lean D
CQ Politics	Lean D
The New York Times	Lean D
CNN	Lean D
NPR	Lean D
MSNBC	Lean D
Fox News	Likely D
Associated Press	Likely D
Rasmussen Reports	Safe D

=== Polling ===
Both McCain and Obama led in various state polls taken from February until the end of April, when Obama took a steady, moderate lead in the state polling. His lead was temporarily reduced to within margins of error and ties when Governor Sarah Palin of Alaska was announced as McCain's running mate in late August, but when the 2008 financial crisis became a more potent election issue near the end of September, Obama took a double-digit lead in the state polls, causing many analysts to no longer consider Pennsylvania a swing state in 2008. Nevertheless, John McCain campaigned heavily in the state near Election Day, and some polls showed Obama's lead narrowing down to single digits. McCain hoped that Pennsylvania might be the swing state that ensured him a narrow victory. However, the economic crisis weighed heavily on the minds of voters across the country, and in Pennsylvania it was no different, where many voters blamed the Republicans for the collapse, ultimately helping Obama who ended up carrying Pennsylvania by a strong margin of 10.32%.

=== Fundraising ===
Obama raised $14,043,740. McCain raised $5,188,757.

=== Advertising and visits ===
Obama spent almost $42 million, while McCain spent almost $30 million. The Obama campaign visited the state 16 times. The McCain campaign visited 31 times.

== Analysis ==
McCain did win more counties than Obama, but the counties carried by Obama were by far the most populated of the state, including Philadelphia, Allegheny and Lehigh counties, home to the state's three largest cities: Philadelphia, Pittsburgh and Allentown respectively.

Obama did extremely well throughout eastern Pennsylvania. He won more than 80% of voters in the city of Philadelphia, and two of its suburban counties gave him 3-to-2 margins (the other suburban counties also voted for Obama). Democratic margins from Philadelphia and its suburbs were more than Obama's statewide margin of victory. North of Philadelphia, the heavily industrialized, pro-union counties characterized by cities such as Scranton (birthplace of Obama's running mate, Joe Biden), Wilkes-Barre and Allentown strongly backed Obama as well. African-American and Latino voters, as well as younger college-age voters, in Monroe County and even in very Republican Pike and Wayne counties gave Obama a much greater share of the vote than Kerry received in 2004. He also managed to win four traditionally Republican counties in the eastern part of the state, Dauphin (home to the state capital, Harrisburg), Monroe, Chester, and Berks; the last Democrat to carry these counties was Lyndon Johnson in 1964. In addition, Obama remained competitive in the two most Republican counties in the eastern region: Lancaster (which gave George W. Bush his largest margin of victory in the entire state) and York. While John Kerry lost Lancaster by 32%, Obama lost the county by only 12%, a substantial improvement.

John McCain, however, did best in Southwestern Pennsylvania around Pittsburgh, a part of Appalachia and the central, rural "T". Central Pennsylvania is a Republican stronghold; John McCain won the vast majority of its counties, often by substantial margins. However, Southwestern Pennsylvania, until recently, was the most Democratic region of the state outside of Philadelphia. Historically, when a Democrat carried Pennsylvania, the entire lower-left corner of the state from Pittsburgh to Johnstown was coated blue. The heavily unionized, Appalachian counties in and around Pittsburgh strongly voted against Ronald Reagan in 1984; in that election the only other county in the state to vote Democratic was Philadelphia. In 2008, McCain flipped Washington, Beaver, and Fayette counties for the first time since 1972, leaving Allegheny County, home to Pittsburgh, as the sole remaining blue county. It was one of the few regions of the country in which Obama did worse than John Kerry. This largely mirrored Obama's struggles in Appalachia throughout the Democratic primary, when voters in this region strongly backed Hillary Clinton.

As of the 2024 presidential election, this is the last election in which Carbon County, Elk County, Cambria County, and Berks County voted for the Democratic candidate. During the same election at the state level, Democrats picked up two seats in the Pennsylvania House of Representatives, but Republicans picked up one seat in the Pennsylvania Senate. Democrats also picked up a seat in the U.S. House of Representatives in Pennsylvania's 3rd Congressional District as Democrat Kathy Dahlkemper defeated seven-term incumbent Republican Phil English by a 2.48% margin of victory. Dahlkemper received 51.24% of the vote, while English took in 48.76%.

== Results ==
2008 United States presidential election in Pennsylvania
Party	Candidate	Running mate	Votes	Percentage	Electoral votes
Democratic	Barack Obama	Joe Biden	3,276,363	54.47%	21
Republican	John McCain	Sarah Palin	2,655,885	44.15%	0
Independent	Ralph Nader	Matt Gonzalez	42,977	0.71%	0
Libertarian	Bob Barr	Wayne Allyn Root	19,912	0.33%	0
Constitution	Chuck Baldwin	Darrell Castle	1,348	0.02%	0
Write-ins	Write-ins		17,043	0.28%	0
Totals			6,015,477	100.00%	21
Voter turnout (voting age population)					63.7%

=== By county ===
County	Barack Obama Democratic		John McCain Republican		Ralph Nader Independent		Bob Barr Libertarian		Various candidates Other parties		Margin		Total votes cast
County	#	%	#	%	#	%	#	%	#	%	#	%	Total votes cast
Adams	17,633	39.41%	26,349	58.89%	355	0.79%	154	0.34%	250	0.55%	-8,716	-19.48%	44,741
Allegheny	373,153	57.05%	272,347	41.64%	3,927	0.60%	2,009	0.31%	2,603	0.39%	100,806	15.41%	654,039
Armstrong	11,138	36.80%	18,542	61.27%	263	0.87%	138	0.46%	182	0.60%	-7,404	-24.47%	30,263
Beaver	40,499	47.63%	42,895	50.45%	826	0.97%	268	0.32%	544	0.64%	-2,396	-2.82%	85,032
Bedford	6,059	26.87%	16,124	71.51%	164	0.73%	96	0.43%	105	0.46%	-10,065	-44.64%	22,548
Berks	97,047	53.76%	80,513	44.60%	1,614	0.89%	826	0.46%	511	0.28%	16,534	9.16%	180,511
Blair	19,813	37.17%	32,708	61.37%	335	0.63%	246	0.46%	196	0.37%	-12,895	-24.20%	53,298
Bradford	10,306	39.81%	15,057	58.16%	302	1.17%	122	0.47%	102	0.39%	-4,751	-18.35%	25,889
Bucks	179,031	53.71%	150,248	45.08%	2,405	0.72%	1,240	0.37%	400	0.12%	28,783	8.63%	333,324
Butler	32,260	35.54%	57,074	62.88%	722	0.80%	369	0.41%	336	0.37%	-24,814	-27.34%	90,761
Cambria	32,451	49.16%	31,995	48.47%	905	1.37%	319	0.48%	336	0.51%	456	0.69%	66,006
Cameron	879	38.95%	1,323	58.62%	34	1.51%	9	0.40%	12	0.53%	-444	-19.67%	2,257
Carbon	13,464	49.77%	12,957	47.90%	379	1.40%	123	0.45%	127	0.47%	507	1.87%	27,050
Centre	41,950	55.12%	32,992	43.35%	488	0.64%	333	0.44%	348	0.46%	8,958	11.77%	76,111
Chester	137,833	54.00%	114,421	44.83%	1,230	0.48%	870	0.34%	898	0.35%	23,412	9.17%	255,252
Clarion	6,756	37.79%	10,737	60.06%	169	0.95%	104	0.58%	111	0.62%	-3,981	-22.27%	17,877
Clearfield	14,555	42.78%	18,662	54.85%	443	1.30%	153	0.45%	209	0.61%	-4,107	-12.07%	34,022
Clinton	7,097	47.98%	7,504	50.73%	136	0.92%	54	0.37%	0	0.00%	-407	-2.75%	14,791
Columbia	13,230	46.79%	14,477	51.20%	264	0.93%	92	0.33%	215	0.76%	-1,247	-4.41%	28,278
Crawford	16,780	43.80%	20,750	54.17%	437	1.14%	167	0.44%	173	0.45%	-3,970	-10.37%	38,307
Cumberland	48,306	42.44%	63,739	56.00%	789	0.69%	470	0.41%	521	0.46%	-15,433	-13.56%	113,825
Dauphin	69,975	53.89%	58,238	44.85%	816	0.63%	500	0.39%	316	0.24%	11,737	9.04%	129,845
Delaware	178,870	60.12%	115,273	38.75%	1,955	0.66%	906	0.30%	506	0.17%	63,597	21.37%	297,510
Elk	7,290	50.76%	6,676	46.48%	220	1.53%	85	0.59%	91	0.63%	614	4.28%	14,362
Erie	75,775	59.07%	50,351	39.25%	1,167	0.91%	398	0.31%	580	0.45%	25,424	19.82%	128,271
Fayette	25,866	48.95%	26,081	49.35%	456	0.86%	157	0.30%	284	0.53%	-215	-0.40%	52,844
Forest	1,038	42.06%	1,366	55.35%	30	1.22%	10	0.41%	24	0.97%	-328	-13.29%	2,468
Franklin	21,169	33.12%	41,906	65.56%	370	0.58%	196	0.31%	276	0.43%	-20,737	-32.44%	63,917
Fulton	1,576	24.99%	4,642	73.61%	57	0.90%	31	0.49%	0	0.00%	-3,066	-48.62%	6,306
Greene	7,829	48.59%	7,889	48.96%	219	1.36%	39	0.24%	138	0.85%	-60	-0.37%	16,114
Huntingdon	6,621	35.35%	11,745	62.70%	196	1.05%	70	0.37%	99	0.53%	-5,124	-27.35%	18,731
Indiana	17,065	45.75%	19,727	52.88%	357	0.96%	153	0.41%	0	0.00%	-2,662	-7.13%	37,302
Jefferson	6,447	34.09%	12,057	63.75%	192	1.02%	106	0.56%	110	0.58%	-5,610	-29.66%	18,912
Juniata	3,068	31.25%	6,484	66.04%	107	1.09%	52	0.53%	108	1.10%	-3,416	-34.79%	9,819
Lackawanna	67,520	62.21%	39,488	36.38%	702	0.65%	166	0.15%	663	0.61%	28,032	25.83%	108,539
Lancaster	99,586	43.44%	126,568	55.21%	1,218	0.53%	765	0.33%	1,112	0.49%	-26,982	-11.77%	229,249
Lawrence	19,711	46.54%	21,851	51.60%	395	0.93%	146	0.34%	246	0.58%	-2,140	-5.06%	42,349
Lebanon	23,310	39.80%	34,314	58.59%	449	0.77%	224	0.38%	266	0.46%	-11,004	-18.79%	58,563
Lehigh	87,089	57.12%	63,382	41.57%	1,477	0.97%	525	0.34%	0	0.00%	23,707	15.55%	152,473
Luzerne	72,492	53.32%	61,127	44.96%	1,139	0.84%	417	0.31%	793	0.58%	11,365	8.36%	135,968
Lycoming	18,381	37.17%	30,280	61.24%	383	0.77%	193	0.39%	210	0.42%	-11,899	-24.07%	49,447
McKean	6,465	40.38%	9,224	57.61%	200	1.25%	58	0.36%	63	0.39%	-2,759	-17.23%	16,010
Mercer	26,411	48.76%	26,565	49.04%	611	1.13%	234	0.43%	347	0.64%	-154	-0.28%	54,168
Mifflin	5,375	32.40%	10,929	65.89%	157	0.95%	41	0.25%	85	0.51%	-5,554	-33.49%	16,587
Monroe	39,453	57.50%	28,293	41.23%	498	0.73%	199	0.29%	175	0.26%	11,160	16.27%	68,618
Montgomery	253,393	59.94%	165,552	39.16%	2,091	0.49%	1,383	0.33%	322	0.08%	87,841	20.78%	422,741
Montour	3,364	41.65%	4,574	56.64%	67	0.83%	18	0.22%	53	0.66%	-1,210	-14.99%	8,076
Northampton	75,255	55.35%	58,551	43.07%	1,253	0.92%	528	0.39%	367	0.27%	16,704	12.28%	135,954
Northumberland	14,329	42.00%	19,018	55.75%	415	1.22%	177	0.52%	175	0.52%	-4,689	-13.75%	34,114
Perry	6,396	32.22%	13,058	65.79%	198	1.00%	93	0.47%	103	0.52%	-6,662	-33.57%	19,848
Philadelphia	595,980	83.00%	117,221	16.33%	3,071	0.43%	1,057	0.15%	696	0.10%	478,759	66.67%	718,025
Pike	11,493	47.33%	12,518	51.55%	186	0.77%	87	0.36%	0	0.00%	-1,025	-4.22%	24,284
Potter	2,300	30.46%	5,109	67.66%	63	0.83%	35	0.46%	44	0.58%	-2,809	-37.20%	7,551
Schuylkill	28,300	44.49%	33,767	53.09%	702	1.10%	288	0.45%	548	0.86%	-5,467	-8.60%	63,605
Snyder	5,382	34.58%	9,900	63.60%	139	0.89%	58	0.37%	87	0.56%	-4,518	-29.02%	15,566
Somerset	12,878	36.41%	21,686	61.32%	401	1.13%	203	0.57%	200	0.08%	-8,808	-24.91%	35,368
Sullivan	1,233	39.44%	1,841	58.89%	32	1.02%	14	0.45%	6	0.19%	-608	-19.45%	3,126
Susquehanna	8,381	43.17%	10,633	54.77%	191	0.98%	81	0.42%	129	0.66%	-2,252	-11.60%	19,415
Tioga	6,390	35.25%	11,326	62.48%	177	0.98%	91	0.50%	142	0.77%	-4,936	-27.23%	18,126
Union	7,333	41.96%	9,859	56.42%	136	0.78%	72	0.41%	75	0.43%	-2,526	-14.46%	17,475
Venango	9,238	39.34%	13,718	58.42%	250	1.06%	101	0.43%	174	0.74%	-4,480	-19.08%	23,481
Warren	8,537	45.74%	9,685	51.89%	222	1.20%	73	0.39%	146	0.78%	-1,148	-6.15%	18,663
Washington	46,122	46.82%	50,752	51.52%	841	0.85%	332	0.34%	469	0.48%	-4,630	-4.70%	98,516
Wayne	9,892	43.14%	12,702	55.39%	191	0.83%	50	0.22%	97	0.41%	-2,810	-12.25%	22,932
Westmoreland	72,721	40.96%	102,294	57.62%	1,301	0.73%	557	0.31%	674	0.38%	-29,573	-16.66%	177,547
Wyoming	5,985	45.26%	6,983	52.81%	120	0.91%	50	0.38%	85	0.64%	-998	-7.55%	13,223
York	82,839	42.42%	109,268	55.95%	1,372	0.70%	731	0.37%	1,076	0.55%	-26,429	-13.53%	195,286
Totals	3,276,363	54.47%	2,655,885	44.15%	42,977	0.71%	19,912	0.33%	20,339	0.34%	620,478	10.32%	6,015,476

Counties that flipped from Democratic to Republican

- Beaver (largest city: Aliquippa)
- Fayette (largest borough: Uniontown)
- Washington (largest borough: Peters Township)

Counties that flipped from Republican to Democratic

- Berks (largest borough: Reading)
- Cambria (largest city: Johnstown)
- Carbon (largest borough: Palmerton)
- Centre (largest borough: State College)
- Chester (largest borough: Tredyffrin Township)
- Dauphin (largest borough: Harrisburg)
- Elk (largest borough: St. Marys)
- Monroe (largest borough: Coolbaugh Township)

=== By congressional district ===
Although Barack Obama won Pennsylvania, John McCain carried ten of the commonwealth's 19 congressional districts, including four held by Democrats. One district, PA-03, was extremely close, however, with McCain only winning by 17 votes. Obama won nine districts, including two held by Republicans. The 12th congressional district, held by John Murtha, was the only district that supported Kerry in 2004 and McCain in 2008.

District	McCain	Obama	Representative
1st	11.71%	87.74%	Bob Brady
2nd	9.51%	89.97%	Chaka Fattah
3rd	49.072%	49.067%	Phil English (110th Congress)
3rd	49.072%	49.067%	Kathy Dahlkemper (111th Congress)
4th	54.51%	44.04%	Jason Altmire
5th	54.23%	43.86%	John E. Peterson (110th Congress)
5th	54.23%	43.86%	Glenn Thompson (111th Congress)
6th	41.15%	57.64%	Jim Gerlach
7th	43.13%	55.75%	Joe Sestak
8th	44.97%	53.82%	Patrick Murphy
9th	63.20%	35.23%	Bill Shuster
10th	53.28%	45.02%	Chris Carney
11th	41.80%	56.55%	Paul Kanjorski
12th	49.24%	48.92%	John Murtha
13th	40.53%	58.48%	Allyson Schwartz
14th	28.84%	69.78%	Mike Doyle
15th	43.16%	55.44%	Charlie Dent
16th	51.03%	47.67%	Joe Pitts
17th	50.94%	47.41%	Tim Holden
18th	54.67%	44.02%	Tim Murphy
19th	55.92%	42.45%	Todd Platts

== Electors ==
Technically the voters of Pennsylvania cast their ballots for electors: representatives to the Electoral College. Pennsylvania is allocated 21 electors because it has 19 congressional districts and two senators. All candidates who appear on the ballot or qualify to receive write-in votes must submit a list of 21 electors, who pledge to vote for their candidate and his or her running mate. Whoever wins the majority of votes in the state is awarded all 21 electoral votes. Their chosen electors then vote for president and vice president. Although electors are pledged to their candidate and running mate, they are not obligated to vote for them. An elector who votes for someone other than his or her candidate is known as a faithless elector.

The electors of each state and the District of Columbia met on December 15, 2008, to cast their votes for president and vice president. The Electoral College itself never meets as one body. Instead, the electors from each state and the District of Columbia met in their respective capitols.

The following were the members of the Electoral College from the state. All 20 were pledged to Barack Obama and Joe Biden:

1. Lynne Abraham
2. Christopher Lewis
3. John Brenne
4. Valerie McDonald-Roberts
5. Eileen Connell
6. Thomas McMahon
7. Kathi Cozzone
8. Robert Mello
9. John Fetterman
10. Michael A. Nutter
11. William George
12. Corey O'Brien
13. Patrick B. Gillespie
14. Josh Shapiro
15. Richard Gray
16. Jack Wagner
17. Franco Harris
18. Michael Washo
19. George Hartwick
20. Daylin Leach

== See also ==
- United States presidential elections in Pennsylvania
- 2004 Pennsylvania Democratic presidential primary
- 2008 Republican Party presidential primaries
- 2008 Democratic Party presidential primaries
