= 2010 United States Senate election in Pennsylvania =

- November 2, 2010
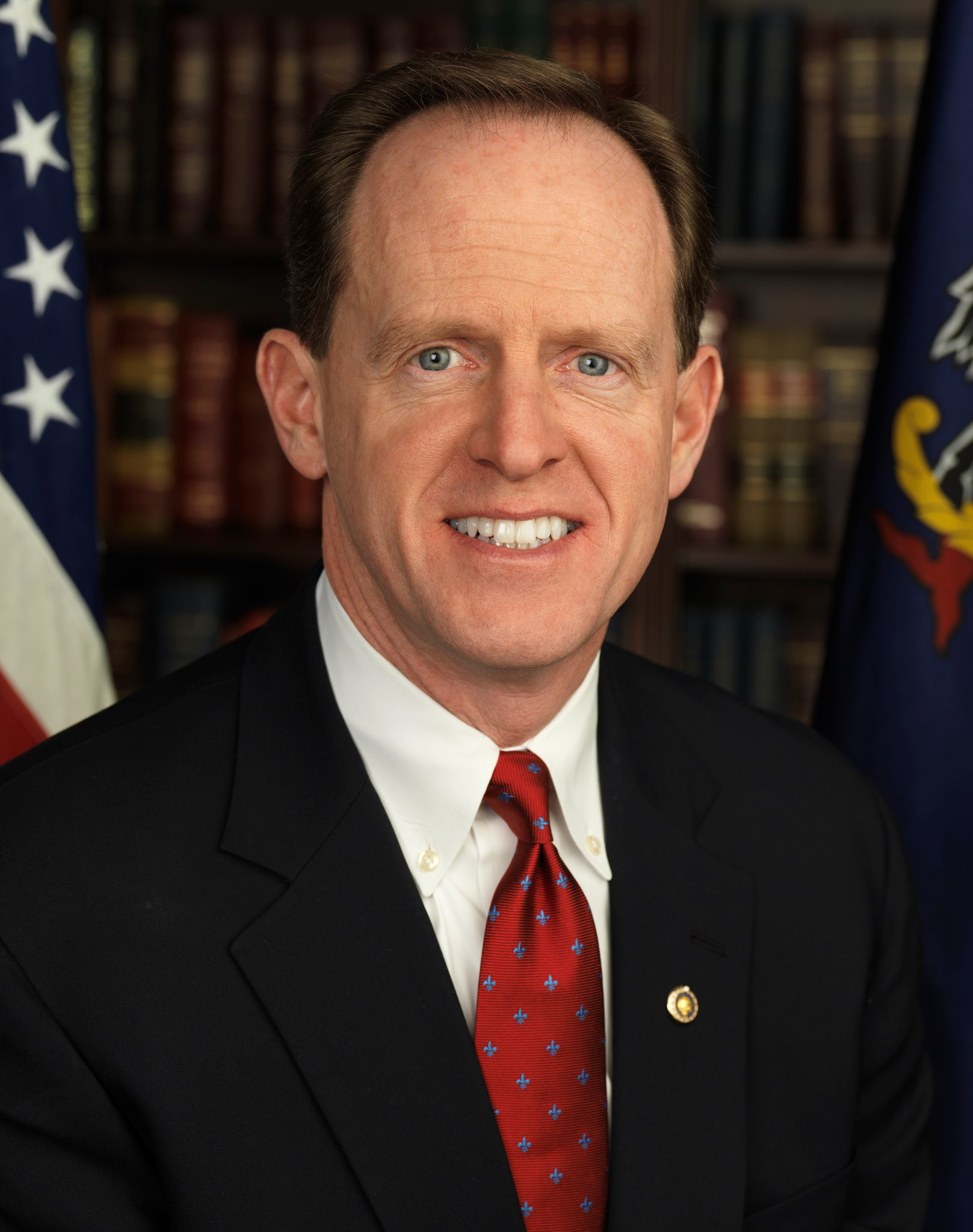

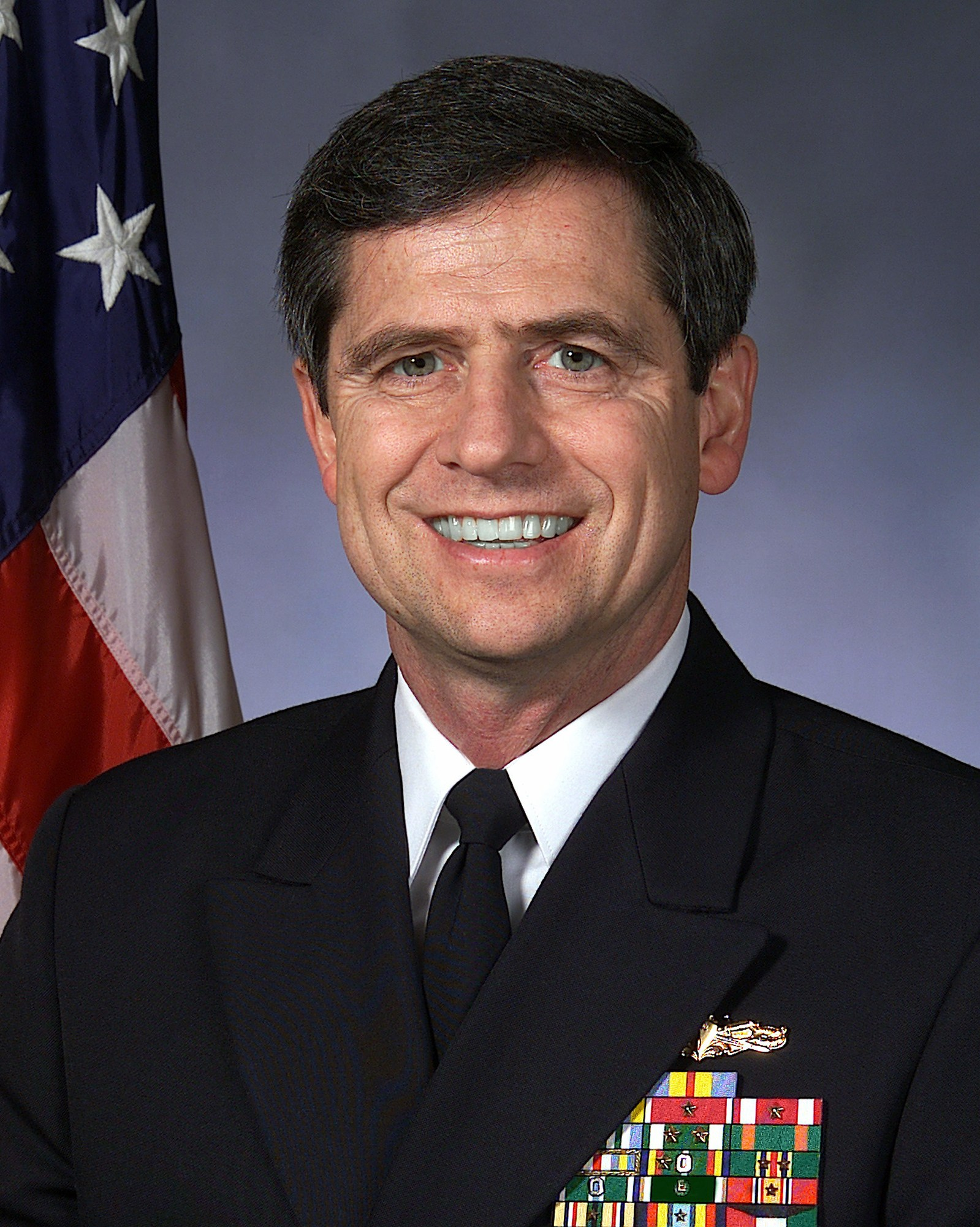
Nominee	Pat Toomey	Joe Sestak
Party	Republican	Democratic
Popular vote	2,028,945	1,948,716
Percentage	51.01%	48.99%
- Toomey: 50–60% 60–70% 70–80% 80–90% >90% Sestak: 50–60% 60–70% 70–80% 80–90% >90% Tie: 50% No data
U.S. senator before election
Arlen Specter
Democratic
Elected U.S. Senator
Pat Toomey
Republican

The 2010 United States Senate election in Pennsylvania was held on November 2, 2010, to elect a member of the United States Senate to represent the state of Pennsylvania. Incumbent U.S. senator Arlen Specter ran for reelection to a sixth term but lost in the Democratic primary to U.S. representative Joe Sestak. Republican nominee Pat Toomey won the general election over Sestak.

Toomey had previously lost the 2004 Republican primary to Specter narrowly, announced on April 15, 2009, that he would challenge Specter again. Specter soon switched from the Republican Party to the Democratic Party, citing his disagreement with the increasingly conservative positions of his former party. Specter faced U.S. representative Joe Sestak in the Democratic primary, which was characterized by attacks between the two Democratic candidates, was one of the most-watched races of the 2010 election cycle. Sestak ultimately defeated Specter in the May 18 primary with 53.9 percent of the vote. Toomey easily defeated Peg Luksik for the Republican nomination with 81.5 percent of the vote.

Toomey defeated Sestak in the general election on November 2 with 51 percent of the vote. Toomey's winning margin made this the third-closest race of the 2010 Senate elections, behind only the elections in Illinois and Colorado.

== Republican primary ==
=== Background ===
Pat Toomey, a Republican who had represented the Lehigh Valley-based 15th congressional district, challenged Specter in the Republican primary for the 2004 Senate election, in which the conservative Toomey tried to portray Specter as too liberal. Although Toomey ultimately lost, he came within 17,000 votes (less than two percent of the vote) despite the Specter's strong name recognition and support from party leaders. In an interview with The Hill on December 1, 2008, Toomey said he was considering a 2010 challenge against Specter, whom he said was "significantly more vulnerable now than he was in 2004." Toomey claimed many liberal and moderate Republicans had abandoned the party to join the Democratic Party in the 2008 presidential primary, eliminating many of Specter's core constituents from the closed primary.

As this disastrous recession worsens, I have become increasingly concerned about the future of our state and national economy. Unfortunately, the recent extraordinary response of the federal government – more corporate bailouts, unprecedented spending and debt, higher taxes – is likely to make things worse. I think we are on a dangerously wrong path. Pennsylvanians want a US Senator focused on real and sustainable job creation that gets our economy growing again. That is why I am considering becoming a candidate for the U.S. Senate.

— Pat Toomey, in a March statement

In January, Toomey announced he would likely not run for Senate and was instead seriously considering a bid for governor in 2010. Peg Luksik, an anti-abortion activist from Johnstown who had previously lost bids for governor in 1990, 1994, and 1998, announced her candidacy for the Republican primary in March after Toomey assured her that he did not plan to run. Although some questioned her lack of experience and limited knowledge of foreign affairs, Luksik said she planned to oppose big government and excessive spending.

However, Toomey reversed his position again after Specter voted for the American Recovery and Reinvestment Act, claiming he believed Specter was supporting federal government bailouts and spending plans that were "taking the country on a dangerously wrong path." In discussions with potential supporters for a gubernatorial campaign, dozens of Pennsylvanians urged Toomey to challenge Specter. In early March, Toomey began to privately assure supporters he would run against Specter, and during his March 28 keynote address to the Pennsylvania Leadership Conference in Harrisburg, he announced, "It's very likely that very soon I will be a candidate for the U.S. Senate." The audience gave him a standing ovation. Luksik was present and said she did not feel betrayed by the surprise announcement but planned to stay in the race. She added, "I understand these two men have a long, personal and rather vindictive history, and there's a real desire for the two of them to go and hit each other with sticks. I get that. I have five sons." Some observers speculated that Luksik and Toomey could split the conservative vote, helping Specter secure victory, but Luksik said she would resist any efforts by conservative Republicans to pressure her into withdrawing.

=== Candidates ===
==== Nominee ====
- Pat Toomey, former U.S. representative from Allentown and candidate for Senate in 2004

==== Eliminated in the primary ====
- Peg Luksik, conservative activist and candidate for governor of Pennsylvania in 1990, 1994, and 1998

==== Withdrew ====
- Arlen Specter, incumbent senator since 1981 (switched parties; ran in Democratic Party primary)

==== Declined ====
- Tom Ridge, former U.S. secretary of Homeland Security, governor of Pennsylvania, and U.S. representative from Erie

=== Campaign ===
==== Specter's party switch ====
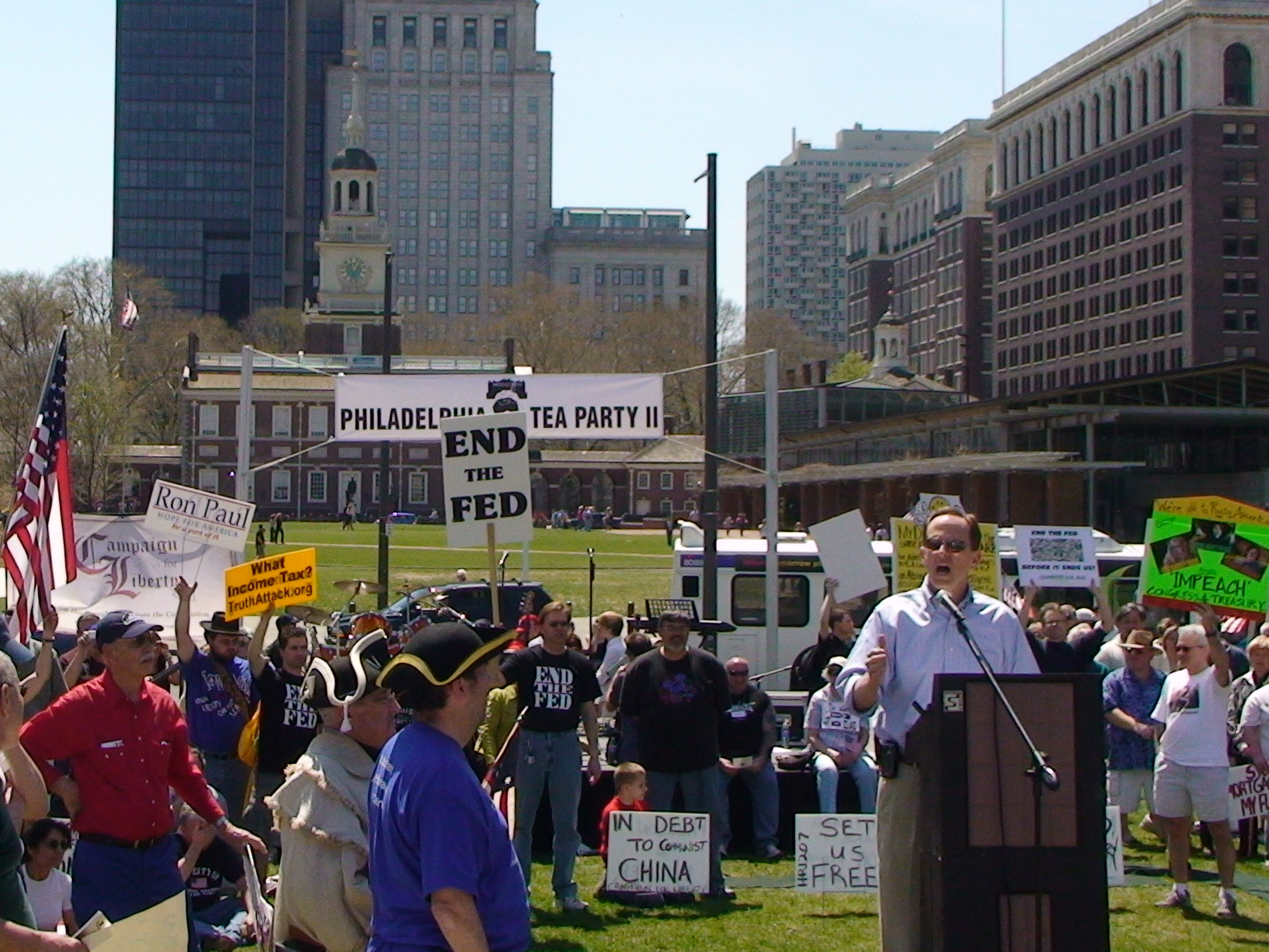
Pat Toomey speaking at a rally in April 2009, the same month he formally announced his candidacy for Senate.

Toomey formally announced his candidacy on April 15, 2009, Tax Day, via a video on his website, and stepped down as head of the anti-tax political organization Club for Growth to concentrate on his campaign. A Quinnipiac University Polling Institute poll released the previous month had indicated Toomey would defeat Specter by 14 percentage points in a two-man race if the primary were held that day. That same poll, however, found three out of four Republicans didn't yet know enough about Toomey to form an opinion about him. Some Republicans expressed concerns that if Toomey defeated Specter in the closed Republican primary, he would be a weaker candidate in the general election and the party could risk losing the Senate seat to the Democrats. Toomey rejected such concerns, pointed to his two successful reelections in the Democratic-leaning Lehigh Valley congressional district as proof he could win votes from the opposing party. Rumors began to circulate that Senator John Cornyn, chairman of the National Republican Senatorial Committee and a Specter supporter, had asked Toomey to drop his candidacy, but Toomey denied those claims. Nevertheless, Toomey received some early support from conservatives like Jim DeMint, the senator from South Carolina who endorsed Toomey and donated thousands of dollars to his campaign.

Starting in April, Specter made the rare move of starting to run television advertisements more than a year before the primary election, linking Toomey's background as a Wall Street banker and support of credit default swaps to the economic crisis. While Toomey criticized Specter as a liberal who consistently sided with the Democratic majority, Specter stressed that if Toomey won the primary, he would lose the general election and give Democrats a 60th seat in the Senate, which would allow them to suppress Republican filibusters. In an interview on Morning Joe, Specter said, "If Mr. Toomey is the nominee, you can be sure he'll lose. He's to the right of Rick Santorum. Santorum lost by 18 points, spent $31 million and was a two-term incumbent." Stuart Rothenberg, editor of the Rothenberg Political Report, said of the expected primary match-up, "Republicans will have to decide whether they want to hold the seat or make a statement about issues and ideology."

On April 28, 2009, however, Specter announced he was leaving the Republican Party and becoming a Democrat, claiming he disagreed with the increasingly conservative direction the party was heading in and found his personal philosophy was now better aligned with the Democratic Party. Although Specter said his decision was made primarily based on principle, he admitted it was also partially due to his poor chances of beating Toomey in the Republican primary: "I have traveled the state and surveyed the sentiments of the Republican Party in Pennsylvania and public opinion polls, observed other public opinion polls and have found that the prospects for winning a Republican primary are bleak." Toomey became widely considered the favorite to win the Republican primary as a result of Specter's defection. Peg Luksik said of Specter's switch, "It is clear that Arlen Specter stands with President Obama on a host of issues and with this decision, has gone home to the Democratic Party."

==== Republican primary ====
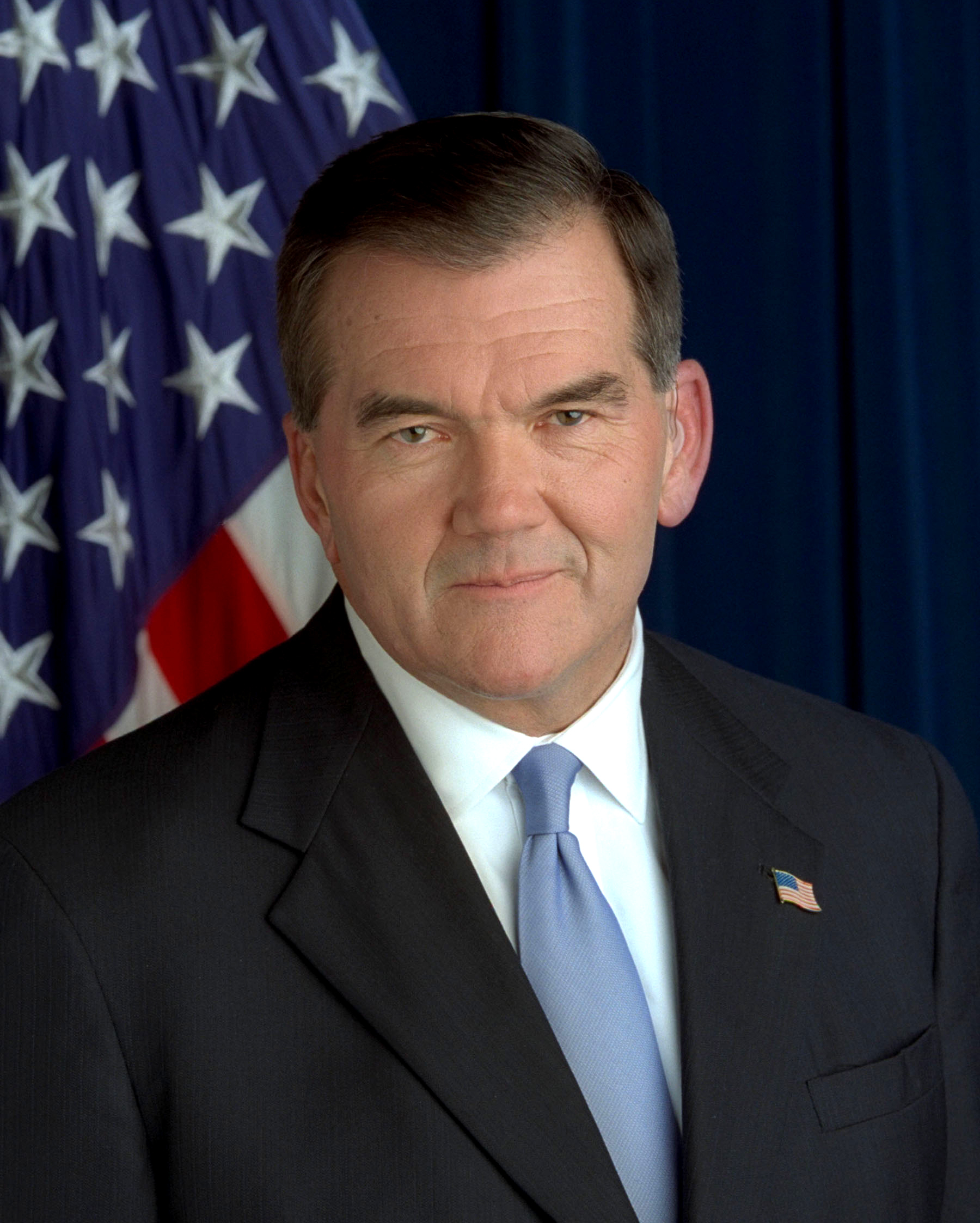
Some Republicans encouraged former Governor Tom Ridge to enter the race, fearing Pat Toomey was too conservative to win the general election.

With Specter's departure from the primary, some speculated that a less conservative candidate than Toomey was needed to defeat Specter in the general election, since the state had previously supported Barack Obama in the 2008 presidential election. John Cornyn declined to immediately endorse Toomey and Senator Orrin Hatch, vice chairman of the National Republican Senatorial Committee, said of him, "I don't think there is anybody in the world who believes he can get elected senator there." Names of other potential Republican candidates began to be floated, like Congressman Jim Gerlach, Lieutenant Governor Joseph B. Scarnati, and State Senate Majority Leader Dominic F. Pileggi, none of whom ruled out running. Some, like Senator Lindsey Graham and Republican State Committee Chairman Robert Gleason, suggested former governor Tom Ridge might be a suitable candidate. Ridge began to seriously contemplate a run, and Quinnipiac University polls indicated Specter held a projected lead over Ridge of only three percentage points, compared to 20 points over Toomey.

Even before Ridge made a final decision, however, conservative bloggers began criticizing Ridge's moderate positions and support for abortion rights. Political opponents also circulated e-mail messages questioning Ridge's residency eligibility because, although he still voted in Pennsylvania, he lived in Chevy Chase, Maryland. On May 7, Ridge announced he would not run in the primary, claiming he preferred to continue supporting the Republican Party by promoting causes as a private citizen. Some felt Ridge's decision not to run ended the Republican Party's best chance to win the seat from Specter. But Toomey expressed confidence he could beat the incumbent senator, claiming Democrats would find him difficult to trust after seeing the way he abandoned the Republicans. Toomey said he "expected to beat Arlen Specter soundly in the Republican primary, but I had no idea I would drive him clear out of the party." A Quinnipiac University poll released on May 28 projected Toomey now trailed Specter by nine percentage points, a smaller gap than Specter's 20-point lead from a May 4 survey.

Although Toomey anticipated that other candidates would enter the race, the Republican primary remained a two-way race between him and Luksik. State Senator Jane Orie, from the North Hills area of Pennsylvania, briefly considered entering the race but announced on July 13 that she would not run because she wanted to concentrate on the state budget. The National Republican Senatorial Committee announced on July 14 that it was endorsing Toomey, even though the group previously helped Specter defeat Toomey in 2004. It was considered a key endorsement expected to help improve fund-raising efforts for Toomey, who had already raised $1.6 million in the previous three-month quarter. By July 22, polls indicated that Specter's projected lead over Toomey had nearly disappeared, as the Senator now led him only 45-44 percent. That same poll showed Toomey led Luksik by 47 percent to 6 percent, a margin so large that media outlets predicted Luksik stood little chance of overcoming him; the Pittsburgh Post-Gazette said Luksik was "not considered to be a stiff challenge". By August, Toomey had an even greater advantage in the polls, 12 points, over Specter.

Following an e-mail exchange with the Democratic challenger Joe Sestak about health care, Toomey agreed to an unorthodox proposal by Sestak to hold a joint town hall about the issue, which was held September 2 at Muhlenberg College in Allentown. Specter was not invited to participate, and political pollster G. Terry Madonna described it as an "informal pact" between Sestak and Toomey to weaken their joint rival, something the two men denied. Commentators suggested Toomey was willing to help Sestak at this stage of the race because he preferred Sestak as a general election opponent rather than Specter, who could possibly steal Republican and Independent voters from Toomey. By October, Toomey had raised a total of $3.1 million for the race, but spent $861,000 in the past three-month quarter as he traveled across the state for his campaign. In contrast, Luksik raised less than $100,000 from June to October. Also in October, Toomey was endorsed by former Massachusetts Governor and presidential candidate Mitt Romney, who called Toomey the "man for the job" and pledged to help him raise funds.

==== Late campaign ====
We're going to win this election because when you give people a choice between prosperity and stagnation, they'll choose prosperity. We're on the side of the people who pay all the bills. I believe they will choose to return to the principles of this great party.

— Pat Toomey in February 2010

Toomey continued to hold projected leads against his Democratic opponents as the primary campaign entered 2010, with January polls indicating he held a 14-point lead over Specter and a 17-point lead over Sestak. Some political scientists, like G. Terry Madonna and Jeff Brauer, attributed Toomey's gains to voter dissatisfaction with the health-care plan before Congress and a poor national political climate for Democrats and incumbents. Toomey's campaign continued to portray him as a political outsider and small-government advocate while condemning Specter and Sestak as "a rubber stamp for the Reid-Pelosi big government agenda". In February, it was announced Toomey raised more money than Specter in the final three months of 2009, earning $1.67 million compared to Specter's $1.15 million, although Specter's total war chest of $8.66 million was still significantly larger than Toomey's $2.8 million. In that same quarter, Peg Luksik raised $163,000 and had $66,000 on hand. On February 13, the Republican State Committee of Pennsylvania endorsed Toomey over Peg Luskik in the Senate race. Toomey told the committee he would work to restore fiscally conservative principals to Washington and fight to eliminate street money, or state grants offered in exchange for support on key issues. When asked whether Luksik would continue to run, she replied, "Absolutely. Are you kidding? I always run un-endorsed."

With news outlets like the Pittsburgh Post-Gazette and Fox News predicting Toomey would have little difficult defeating Luksik in the primary, Toomey again became involved with the Democratic primary by accepting an invitation to a second debate with Sestak, who had been trying unsuccessfully to engage Arlen Specter in more than one primary debate. In accepting the April 11 debate, Toomey said, "Like many politicians who have spent decades in Washington, Sen. Specter maintains a sense of entitlement to his office and he is unwilling to put his record and ideas to the test of open and honest debate." In response to the scheduled debate, Luksik spokesman Steve Clark said Toomey had to remember he was running against Luksik in the primary, not Sestak or Specter. By March, Specter appeared to be gaining momentum in the Democratic primary, with polls indicating he not only led Sestak by 24 percentage points, but had recaptured a projected lead against Toomey in the general election by a margin of 49 percent to 42 percent. Pollsters indicated Specter was benefiting greatly from the large amount of media attention the Democratic primary had received, as well as the Senator's strong name recognition, whereas Sestak and Toomey remained relatively unknown.

When the Senate candidates publicly released their quarterly campaign finance reports on April 15, it was revealed that Pat Toomey once again raised more in the first three months of 2010 than either Democratic candidate, increasing his funds by $2.3 million to a total of a $4.1 million war chest compared to Specter raising $1.1 million to a total of $9.1 million and Sestak raising $0.4 million to a total of $5.3 million. The funds raised that quarter made Toomey the best-funded Senate challenger in the country to that point. Political analysts attributed Toomey's success to the national swing in momentum toward Republicans, and said it could indicate the Republicans would be victorious in many Senate races, including in Pennsylvania. Meanwhile, Luksik continued to campaign in low-attendance appearances on conservative anti-abortion, anti-tax and anti-spending principles, while portraying herself as a down-to-earth housewife and common-sense candidate. In the days leading up to the primary election, Toomey received endorsements by the Pittsburgh Post-Gazette and the Pittsburgh Tribune-Review. On May 10, he ran his first television advertisement, which called for more jobs and less government and included a narrator saying, "Trillion dollar bailouts and deficits, government-run health care, record unemployment. Had enough?" John Baer of the Philadelphia Daily News said Toomey was so widely expected to defeat Luksik that he said of the Republican primary, "The race is a balloon with no air. It sits flat while the Democratic fight between Arlen Specter and Joe Sestak sucks up all the oxygen."

Pat Toomey won the May 18 primary with 81.5 percent of the vote, or 668,409 of the votes cast, compared to 18.5 percent and 151,802 votes for Peg Luksik. The Associated Press wrote that Luksik could not overcome Toomey's financial advantages, particularly when the Republican primary was so overshadowed by the Democratic race. The Philadelphia Inquirer wrote that Toomey's run against Luksik in the primary "will help him maintain his competitive condition" against Sestak, who defeated Specter in the Democratic primary.

=== Polling ===
Poll source	Dates administered	Arlen Specter*	Pat Toomey	Tom Ridge*	Peg Luksik
Research 2000	December 8, 2008	43%	28%	––	––
Franklin/Marshall	March 17, 2009	33%	18%	––	2%
Qunnipiac	March 19, 2009	27%	41%	––	––
Rasmussen	April 21, 2009	30%	51%	––	––
POS	May 3, 2009	––	22%	62%	2%
Public Opinion	May 5, 2009	––	23%	60%	––
Research 2000	May 7, 2009	––	41%	33%	––
Quinnipiac	May 28, 2009	––	38%	––	3%
Quinnipiac	July 19, 2009	––	47%	––	6%
Quinnipiac	May 12, 2010	––	60%	––	9%
Suffolk	May 13, 2010	––	60%	––	9%

* Declined to run for Republican nomination

=== Results ===
Republican primary results
Party	Candidate	Votes	%
Republican	Pat Toomey	668,409	81.5%
Republican	Peg Luksik	151,802	18.5%
Total votes		820,211	100.0%

== Democratic primary ==
=== Candidates ===
==== Nominee ====
- Joe Sestak, U.S. representative from PA-07 (2007–2011)

==== Eliminated in primary ====
- Arlen Specter, incumbent U.S. senator (1981–2011)

==== Withdrawn ====
- William C. Kortz, state representative from HD-38 (2007–2011)

=== Campaign ===
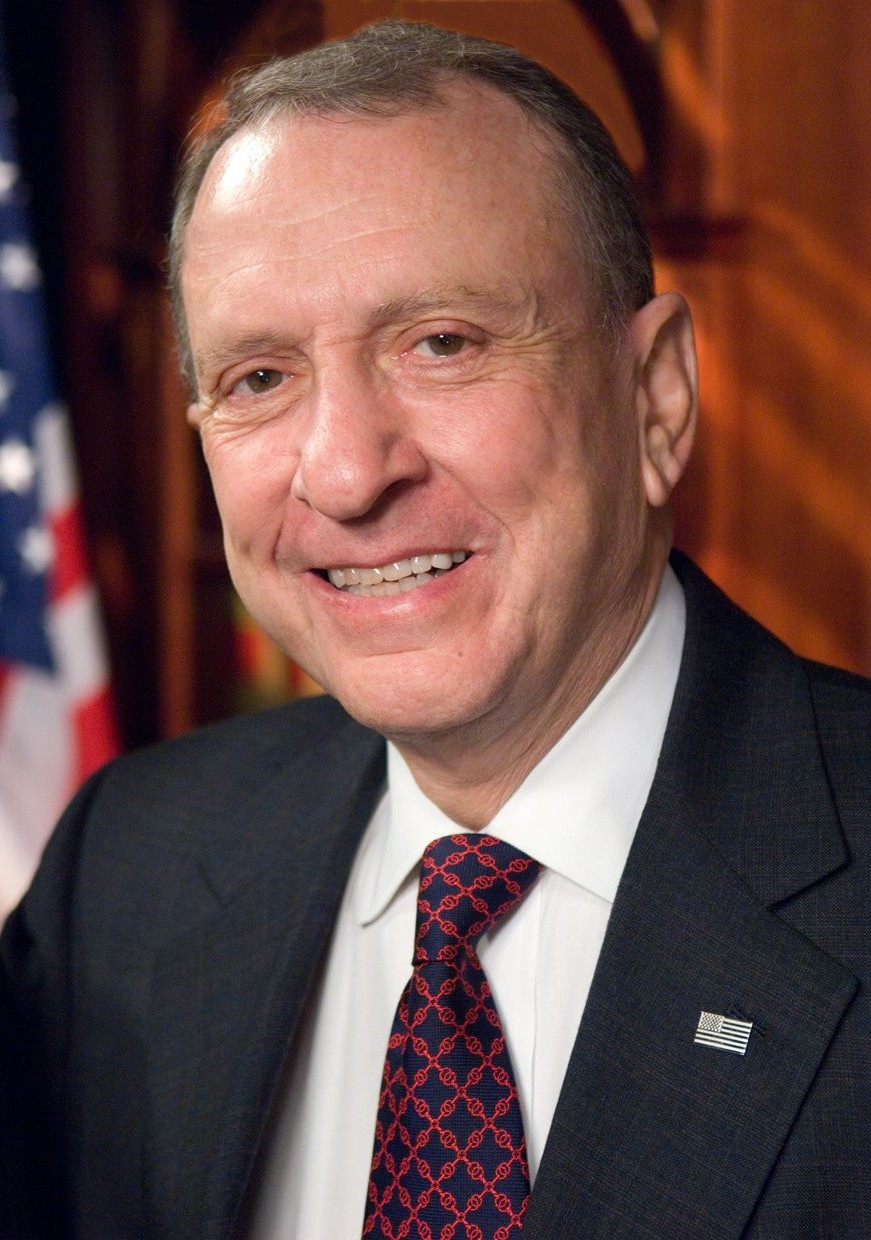
Long-time Republican Senator Arlen Specter switched to the Democratic Party, in part because he knew he was unlikely to win the Republican primary. He ultimately lost to Joe Sestak in the Democratic primary.

The Democratic party race between Specter and Sestak was considered one of the most bitter and highly watched of all the 2010 primary elections. On April 28, 2009, Specter switched to the Democratic Party after having served in the Senate as a Republican for 28 years, encouraged by Vice President Joe Biden and Pennsylvania Governor Ed Rendell, after he had voted in favor of President Barack Obama's economic stimulus plan and was faced with opposition from Pennsylvania Republicans. Although Specter claimed he switched largely because he disagreed with the increasingly conservative direction the Republican Party was heading in, he also admitted that the switch was due to his poor chances of winning a Republican primary against Toomey due to Specter's support of the Obama stimulus package . The Democratic establishment had until then encouraged Sestak, a former U.S. Navy admiral and the representative of Pennsylvania's 7th congressional district, to run in the Democratic primary. But after Specter switched parties he was largely embraced by such major Democratic figures as Obama, Biden, Rendell and Senate Majority Leader Harry Reid. The Democratic establishment now feared Sestak would harm Specter's chances in the general election and encouraged him to drop out, but Sestak refused and strongly criticized Specter's party switch as an opportunistic move aimed solely at political self-preservation.

Specter led Sestak by more than 20 percentage points in polling for most of the race and, while Sestak struggled to overcome problems from his low name recognition, Specter received endorsements from major Democratic figures and influential organizations like the AFL-CIO and Pennsylvania Democratic Committee. Specter's lead narrowed significantly in the final month of the campaign, when Sestak concentrated his funds and efforts on television commercials that questioned Specter's Democratic credentials. As the race progressed, Specter grew more strongly critical of Sestak, attacking his House attendance record, accusing him of failing to pay his staffers' minimum wage, and claiming that he was demoted in the Navy for creating a "poor command climate". On May 18, Sestak ended Specter's nearly 30-year Senate career, earning 53.8 percent of the primary vote to Specter's 46.2 percent. Political observers said the commercials played a major part in Sestak's victory, and that a national swing in momentum toward Republicans and against incumbents ultimately harmed Specter's chances. During the primary campaign, it was revealed that former President Bill Clinton had offered Sestak a position in the Obama administration if he withdrew his candidacy. This drew allegations from Republicans that the administration violated federal statutes forbidding government employees from interfering with a Senate election, but no formal investigation was opened. The Democratic primary occurred on May 18, 2010. Although Specter had won the endorsement of the Pennsylvania Democratic Party, at 10:14 PM EDT that evening, the Associated Press projected the race as won by Sestak.

=== Polling ===
Poll source	Dates administered	Arlen Specter	Joe Sestak
POS	May 3, 2009	62%	24%
Research 2000	May 4, 2009	56%	11%
Quinnipiac	May 28, 2009	50%	21%
Rasmussen Reports	June 17, 2009	51%	32%
Franklin/Marshall	June 25, 2009	33%	13%
Quinnipiac	July 19, 2009	55%	23%
Rasmussen Reports	August 11, 2009	47%	34%
Research 2000	August 12, 2009	48%	33%
Quinnipiac	September 28, 2009	44%	25%
Rasmussen Reports	October 13, 2009	46%	42%
Rasmussen Reports	December 8, 2009	48%	35%
Quinnipiac U	December 8, 2009	53%	30%
Rasmussen Reports	January 18, 2010	53%	32%
Rasmussen Reports	February 8, 2010	51%	36%
Quinnipiac	February 22–28, 2010	53%	29%
Research 2000	March 8–10, 2010	51%	32%
Rasmussen Reports	March 15, 2010	48%	37%
Quinnipiac	March 31 – April 5, 2010	53%	32%
Rasmussen Reports	April 13, 2010	44%	42%
Muhlenberg/Morning Call	May 2, 2010	48%	42%
Quinnipiac	April 28 – May 2, 2010	47%	39%
Muhlenberg/Morning Call	May 7, 2010	43%	43%
Muhlenberg/Morning Call	May 8, 2010	42%	44%
Muhlenberg/Morning Call	May 9, 2010	42%	46%
Rasmussen Reports	May 10, 2010	42%	47%
Muhlenberg/Morning Call	May 10, 2010	42%	47%
Muhlenberg/Morning Call	May 11, 2010	43%	47%
Muhlenberg/Morning Call	May 12, 2010	45%	45%
Quinnipiac	May 12, 2010	44%	42%
Franklin & Marshall	May 12, 2010	36%	38%
Muhlenberg/Morning Call	May 13, 2010	44%	44%
Suffolk	May 13, 2010	40%	49%
Muhlenberg/Morning Call	May 14, 2010	45%	43%
Daily Kos/Research 2000	May 14, 2010	43%	45%
Muhlenberg/Morning Call	May 15, 2010	44%	43%
Muhlenberg/Morning Call	May 16, 2010	44%	44%
Quinnipiac	May 16, 2010	41%	42%

=== Results ===
Results by county: Sestak: 50–60%; 60–70%; Specter: 50–60%; 60–70%

Democratic primary results
Party	Candidate	Votes	%
Democratic	Joe Sestak	568,563	53.9%
Democratic	Arlen Specter (incumbent)	487,217	46.1%
Total votes		1,055,780	100.0%

== General election ==
=== Candidates ===
- Pat Toomey, former U.S. representative from Allentown
- Joe Sestak, U.S. representative from Edgmont

=== Campaign ===
==== Early weeks ====
I passionately disagree with his ideas, and you're going to see us talking about that, but there will never be anything of a personal nature. At the end of the game, let's have had a great debate and then go out and have a beer. That's how they did it in the old days.

— Joe Sestak on his mutual agreement with Toomey for a "clean" campaign

Shortly after Joe Sestak's primary victory, Arlen Specter called him to offer congratulations and vowed to support his candidacy, saying that "I think it's vital to keep this seat in the Democratic Party." Both Sestak and Pat Toomey began campaigning for the general election the day after the May 18 primary. Before reporting to Capitol Hill for House matters, Sestak appeared in interviews on several national media outlets including CNN, MSNBC, NPR and CBS News. Both Toomey and Sestak said they considered each other friends and vowed to engage in a "clean" campaign focusing on policy rather than personal attacks. The two quickly began challenging each other's records, however, with Sestak citing Toomey's past Wall Street career and claiming he would rather aid rich bankers than the working class, and Toomey portraying Sestak as a liberal aligned with Harry Reid and Nancy Pelosi. The day after the primary, Sestak claimed that Toomey wanted to continue "to back failed policies of George W. Bush" and "to let Wall Street do whatever it wants". At a rally at the Allegheny County Airport, Toomey said Sestak's politics were more liberal than most mainstream Democrats and described him as a proponent of "even-larger government".

Within minutes of Sestak's victory, National Republican Senatorial Committee Chairman John Cornyn issued a statement describing Sestak as too liberal for Pennsylvania, claiming that he consistently voted with Washington Democratic leaders and supported energy policies that would reduce jobs. President Barack Obama, Vice President Joe Biden, and Pennsylvania Governor Ed Rendell, all of whom vocally supported Specter in the primary, each called Sestak after his primary victory and pledged to support him in the general election. Congressman Darrell Issa, the ranking Republican on the House Committee on Oversight and Government Reform, said it would "be incredibly disingenuous and reek of political payback" for Sestak to accept any such support from the Obama administration after Sestak had accused the White House of offering him a job in exchange for dropping out of the Democratic primary. Nevertheless, while Sestak said he would not become "part of the establishment", he welcomed the Obama administration's support and said, "I plan on being the president's best ally."

On May 20, Toomey released the first statewide advertisement of the campaign, a television commercial with a narrator describing both candidates as "Two good men with very different ideas." The ad contrasted the positions between the two candidates on the Wall Street bailout, national health-care debate and terrorist trials. Meanwhile, Sestak said Toomey needed to be held accountable for his support of bank deregulation and former President George W. Bush's financial policies which helped lead to the economic recession. The Democratic Senatorial Campaign Committee said Toomey was "conveniently failing to mention his decades of service to Wall Street" in his advertisements. When asked about the promise between Sestak and Toomey to maintain a clean and friendly campaign, Pennsylvania Democratic Party Chairman T.J. Rooney said, "Guess what? That all changed at 10:30 p.m. (Tuesday). I hope the congressman adheres to his word, but I have no consuming expectation that he will. It's going to get hard in a moment. This race is going to take a turn."

Early polls showed varied results over who was leading, although some indicated Sestak had an advantage due to the positive press he received for defeating Arlen Specter. Despite Specter's stated support for Sestak, the Senator's former chief of staff David Urban, now a lobbyist, offered his support to Toomey after the Democratic primary ended. Urban sought to connect moderate Republicans, conservative Democrats and the current and former chiefs of staff of Republicans and encourage them to help Toomey get elected. Both candidates sought to use online media avenues to reach out to prospective voters, which was still considered a relatively new field for politicians. The two started accounts on Twitter, with the ToomeyForSenate account amassing 4,907 followers and the Sestak2010 account 3,796 followers as of June 4. Both also had accounts on Facebook, where Toomey had 10,361 friends and Sestak had 3,146.

Both candidates have decided to go negative and go negative early because both are trying to win by making the other candidate unacceptable and therefore, not the choice of the voters.

— Lara Brown, Villanova University professor

Sestak and Toomey had wildly different views on almost every issue, including abortion, health care, energy, social security and the recent stimulus bill and financial bailouts. Sestak favored the bailouts of the United States financial system, automobile industry and mortgage giants Fannie Mae and Freddie Mac, claiming they saved many jobs and homes. Toomey condemned them as a waste of taxpayer money that rewarded irresponsible behavior. Sestak praised the financial regulatory reform bill before Congress as "a victory for the American people over Wall Street" that would protect the economy from shadow banking and toxic assets. Toomey said it did nothing to prevent taxpayer bailouts of failing corporations. Toomey also argued against a proposed cap and trade bill, which he said would encourage firms to move manufacturing jobs overseas and force Pennsylvania businesses to close. Sestak claimed the bill would help businesses by lowering energy costs in the long-run, claiming, "Pat Toomey is in the pocket of big oil, and big oil doesn't want alternative energy."

Following the Deepwater Horizon oil spill in the Gulf of Mexico, Sestak criticized Toomey for his support of offshore drilling in Lake Erie, claiming the proposal risked placing 90 percent of the country's surface water in danger. Toomey said that he supported allowing states to retain the right to make decisions about drilling, and claimed Sestak was too willing to cede control to the federal government. Both Sestak and Toomey sought to portray themselves as the ideal candidates for small-business issues. Toomey campaigned on lower taxes and less regulation, and released a 30-second television advertisement emphasizing his experience as owner of a small chain of bars and restaurants in the 1990s. Sestak countered that image, however, citing past court depositions that indicated Toomey was not very involved in the businesses and delegated most responsibilities to his brother Steven. Sestak said he would help small businesses through tax cuts and federal loan guarantees.

Heading into July, polls still indicated that the two candidates were roughly even. Peter Brown, assistant director of the Quinnipiac University Polling Institute, said this was better news for Toomey than Sestak because it meant Toomey had "limited the damage" from the national positive publicity Sestak received after defeating Arlen Specter. From April 1 to June 30, Toomey raised $3.1 million compared to Sestak's $1.95 million. This left Toomey with $4.56 million in total funds, more than twice Sestak's total amount of about $2 million. Toomey was considered to have a financial advantage in part because he did not have as challenging a primary as Sestak, and thus was able to save most of his money. Additionally, the Democratic Senatorial Campaign Committee spent $1.4 million of the allotted sum in support of Specter during the primary, which left them with only $200,000 for the general election race.

In July, Toomey began airing five new television commercials, focusing on how he would oppose the Democratic establishment if elected, and four focusing on different votes Sestak had cast in the House: the stimulus plan, health-care reform, cap and trade, and tax increases. The ads characterized Sestak's positions as extreme, and each ended with a narrator saying, "That's liberal. That's Joe Sestak." Although they directly attacked Sestak, Toomey claimed that they did not break the candidates' pledge for a clean campaign because they focused on his policies, not his character. By running the commercials four months before the general election campaign, Toomey hoped to gain an advantage in name recognition. Also in July, the United States Chamber of Commerce began running television advertisements criticizing Sestak's support of "a government takeover of health care" and "billions in job-killing energy taxes", claiming he voted with Nancy Pelosi "100 percent of the time". Sestak called the ads inaccurate, citing specific instances when he voted against Pelosi; Two Pennsylvania television stations removed the ads, but Toomey defended them, claiming they were not misleading and accusing Sestak of being "hyper-sensitive".

==== Final campaign ====
Starting in July, both Sestak and Toomey blamed each other for the federal budget deficits that had become a national spotlight amid the troubled economy. Toomey portrayed Sestak as lacking "fiscal discipline" and supporting budget earmarks for pet projects, while Sestak said Toomey supported President George W. Bush's deficit spending and damaged the economy by helping deregulate Wall Street. On July 15, The Philadelphia Inquirer reported that Sestak received at least $119,650 in campaign contributions from employees of companies that received federal earmarks he had steered to the state since 2008. Although a common practice among political candidates, Sestak had advocated banning earmarks in favor of a competitive grant program, and vowed on his website to return any contributions from organizations or individuals who "has made a request for an appropriations project". In response to the story, Toomey called on Sestak to return those contributions, which he did not respond to. However, Sestak said he routinely returned money from employees of such companies, but sometimes had difficulty tracking donations from low-level employees. Toomey vowed never to seek earmarks if elected, while Sestak said although he favors ending the practice, he would continue advocating for them as long as earmarks continued to exist.

While Sestak presented economists who agreed with his positions, the conservative non-profit Citizens Against Government Waste gave him a zero rating on spending issues based on a review of 120 of his votes in Congress. Toomey challenged Sestak to sign a "No Pork" pledge offered by the organization. In turn, Sestak criticized Toomey for accepting campaign contributions from Club for Growth, a group that Toomey used to spearhead and which received criticism from such prominent Republicans as Senator Orrin Hatch, Senator John McCain and former Arkansas Governor Mike Huckabee.

On August 2, moderate Republican Senator Susan Collins, who was once condemned by Toomey's Club for Growth for her support of the stimulus package, headlined a $1,000-a-plate luncheon for Toomey's campaign at Philadelphia's Union League. The Philadelphia Inquirer said Collins' support indicated Toomey was finding success in seeking moderate support for his candidacy. The newspaper noted other apparent efforts to draw in centrists, including Toomey's support for Supreme Court Justice Sonia Sotomayor, who many conservatives opposed, and the fact that throughout the campaign Toomey had rarely brought up social issues like gay rights and abortion, for which he held conservative views. Sestak's campaign claimed those gestures only sought to conceal an extremely conservative voting record.

The first debate was held on October 20 at WPVI-TV studios in Philadelphia and the second held on October 22 at WPXI studios in Pittsburgh. Both candidates criticized the each other's ideology and referred to the other as extreme. Toomey heavily criticized Sestak for his support of Obama's stimulus, cap and trade, and healthcare reform. Sestak not only supported these measures but said they did not go far enough, referred to Toomey as "Pennsylvania's most right-wing congressman", and criticized him for working at Wall Street and supporting the elimination of corporate taxes.

Toomey was endorsed by former longtime Democratic Mayor of Harrisburg Stephen Reed, former NYC Mayor Rudy Giuliani, United States Chamber of Commerce, NRA Political Victory Fund, U.S. Senator Scott Brown and former governor Sarah Palin. Newspaper endorsements include the Pittsburgh Tribune-Review, The Intelligencer, The Tribune-Democrat and the Bucks County Courier Times.

Sestak was endorsed by independent NYC Mayor Michael Bloomberg and former Republican U.S. Senator Chuck Hagel. Sestak received newspaper endorsements from the Pittsburgh Post-Gazette, The Philadelphia Inquirer, the Erie Times-News, The Citizens' Voice, The Patriot-News, the Observer-Reporter, and The Huffington Post.

Toomey defeated Sestak on election day by a margin of 80,229 votes, and 2.1 percentage points. The Associated Press called the race for Toomey shortly after midnight. The Washington Post credited his victory to voter discontent with the Obama administration and unemployment rates. Sestak conceded defeat addressing a crowd at a suburban Philadelphia hotel in his congressional district, stating "it is now Alex time" referring to his 9-year-old daughter. Toomey gave his victory speech at a get together in Allentown, stating that the election was a "simple, clear message to the establishment" with some conciliatory notes that he would cooperate with the White House and fellow Pennsylvania Senator, Bob Casey Jr, a Democrat. It was third-closest race of the 2010 Senate elections, behind only Illinois and Colorado.

=== Predictions ===
Source	Ranking	As of
RealClearPolitics	Tossup	October 20, 2010
Rothenberg	Tilt R (flip)	October 28, 2010
Sabato's Crystal Ball	Lean R (flip)	October 28, 2010
Rasmussen Reports	Tossup	October 30, 2010
CQ Politics	Tossup	October 31, 2010
Cook Political Report	Tossup	October 31, 2010

=== Polling ===
Poll source	Date(s) administered	Sample size	Margin of error	Joe Sestak (D)	Pat Toomey (R)	Other	Undecided
Research 2000 (report)	May 7, 2009	600	± 4.0%	37%	32%	––	––
Quinnipiac University (report)	May 20, 2009	1,191	± 2.8%	37%	35%	1%	23%
Rasmussen Reports (report)	June 16, 2009	800	± 4.5%	41%	35%	7%	18%
Quinnipiac University (report)	July 19, 2009	1,173	± 2.9%	35%	39%	1%	23%
Rasmussen Reports (report)	August 11, 2009	1,000	± 3.0%	35%	43%	5%	18%
Research 2000 (report)	August 12, 2009	600	± 5.0%	42%	41%	––	17%
Quinnipiac University (report)	September 28, 2009	1,100	± 3.0%	35%	38%	1%	25%
Rasmussen Reports (report)	October 13, 2009	1,000	± 3.0%	38%	37%	6%	19%
Rasmussen Reports (report)	December 8, 2009	1,200	± 3.0%	38%	44%	6%	13%
Quinnipiac University (report)	December 8, 2009	1,381	± 2.6%	35%	40%	1%	22%
Rasmussen Reports (report)	January 18, 2010	1,000	± 3.0%	35%	43%	6%	16%
Rasmussen Reports (report)	February 8, 2010	1,000	± 3.0%	35%	43%	7%	15%
Franklin & Marshall (Report)	February 15–21, 2010	954	± 2.9%	20%	38%	3%	39%
Quinnipiac University (report)	February 22–28, 2010	1,452	± 2.6%	36%	39%	1%	24%
Research 2000 (report)	March 8–10, 2010	600	± 4.0%	39%	42%	––	19%
Rasmussen Reports (report)	March 15, 2010	1,000	± 3.0%	37%	42%	7%	15%
Franklin & Marshall (report)	March 15–21, 2010	1,119	± 2.9%	19%	27%	5%	49%
Public Policy Polling (report)	March 29 – April 1, 2010	934	± 3.2%	36%	42%	––	22%
Quinnipiac University (report)	March 30 – April 5, 2010	1,412	± 2.6%	34%	42%	1%	22%
Rasmussen Reports (report)	April 14, 2010	1,000	± 3.0%	36%	47%	5%	12%
Rasmussen Reports (report)	May 6, 2010	1,000	± 3.0%	40%	42%	10%	9%
Research 2000 (report)	May 14, 2010	600	± 4.0%	40%	45%	––	15%
Rasmussen Reports (report)	May 19, 2010	500	± 4.5%	46%	42%	3%	9%
Research 2000 (report)	May 24–26, 2010	600	± 4.0%	43%	40%	––	––
Rasmussen Reports (report)	June 2, 2010	500	± 4.5%	38%	45%	5%	12%
Public Policy Polling (report)	June 19–21, 2010	609	± 4.0%	41%	41%	––	18%
Rasmussen Reports (report)	June 29, 2010	500	± 4.5%	39%	45%	6%	11%
Quinnipiac University (report)	July 6–11, 2010	1,367	± 2.7%	43%	43%	1%	12%
Rasmussen Reports (report)	July 14, 2010	750	± 4.0%	38%	45%	6%	12%
Rasmussen Reports (report)	July 28, 2010	750	± 4.0%	39%	45%	6%	10%
Public Policy Polling (report)	August 14–16, 2010	585	± 4.1%	36%	45%	––	20%
Rasmussen Reports (report)	August 16, 2010	750	± 4.0%	37%	46%	5%	12%
Rasmussen Reports (report)	August 30, 2010	750	± 4.0%	39%	45%	5%	11%
Ipsos/Reuters (report)	August 31, 2010	407	± 4.0%	37%	47%	2%	15%
Rasmussen Reports (report)	September 13, 2010	750	± 4.0%	41%	49%	2%	8%
Pulse Opinion Research (report)	September 18, 2010	1,000	± 3.0%	40%	48%	4%	8%
Quinnipiac University (report)	September 15–19, 2010	684	± 3.8%	43%	50%	––	7%
CNN/Time Opinion Research (report)	September 17–21, 2010	741	± 3.5%	44%	49%	4%	3%
Muhlenberg/Morning Call (report)	September 18–23, 2010	445	± 5.0%	39%	46%	––	14%
Suffolk University (report)	September 24–27, 2010	500	± 4.4%	40%	45%	––	13%
Rasmussen Reports (report)	September 29, 2010	750	± 4.0%	40%	49%	4%	7%
Rasmussen Reports (report)	October 12, 2010	750	± 4.0%	39%	49%	2%	10%
Quinnipiac University (report)	October 13–17, 2010	1,046	± 3.0%	46%	48%	––	5%
Public Policy Polling (report)	October 17–18, 2010	718	± 3.7%	46%	45%	––	9%
Muhlenberg/Morning Call (report)	October 16–19, 2010	403	± 5.0%	44%	41%	5%	10%
Muhlenberg/Morning Call (report)	October 17–20, 2010	420	± 5.0%	43%	43%	4%	10%
Rasmussen Reports (report)	October 21, 2010	750	± 5.0%	44%	48%	1%	7%
Franklin & Marshall University (report)	October 18–24, 2010	720	± 5.0%	36%	43%	2%	19%
Muhlenberg/Morning Call (report)	October 21–24, 2010	437	± 5.0%	42%	47%	2%	9%
Ipsos/Reuters (report)	October 22–24, 2010	400	± 4.9%	46%	46%	2%	6%
Muhlenberg/Morning Call (report)	October 22–25, 2010	448	± 5.0%	40%	48%	3%	9%
CNN/Time/Opinion Research (report)	October 20–26, 2010	1,517	± 2.5%	45%	49%	3%	––
Muhlenberg/Morning Call (report)	October 23–26, 2010	457	± 5.0%	41%	46%	3%	9%
Muhlenberg/Morning Call (report)	October 24–27, 2010	460	± 5.0%	40%	48%	2%	10%
Susquehanna Polling & Research (report)	October 24–27, 2010	800	± 3.46%	44%	46%	––	9%
Muhlenberg/Morning Call (report)	October 25–28, 2010	470	± 4.5%	42%	47%	3%	9%
Rasmussen Reports (report)	October 28, 2010	750	± 4.0%	46%	50%	1%	3%
Marist College (report)	October 26–28, 2010	806	± 3.5%	45%	52%	1%	2%
Muhlenberg/Morning Call (report)	October 26–29, 2010	480	± 4.5%	43%	45%	2%	10%
Quinnipiac University (report)	October 25–30, 2010	1,244	± 2.8%	45%	50%	––	5%
Muhlenberg/Morning Call (report)	October 27–30, 2010	484	± 4.5%	43%	45%	2%	9%
Muhlenberg/Morning Call (report)	October 28–31, 2010	474	± 4.5%	44%	48%	––	––
Public Policy Polling (report)	October 30–31, 2010	772	± 3.5%	46%	51%	––	4%

=== Fundraising ===
Candidate (party)	Receipts	Disbursements	Cash on hand	Debt
Pat Toomey (R)	$14,818,231	$12,743,824	$2,074,406	$53,000
Joe Sestak (D)	$11,842,844	$10,185,073	$1,657,769	$0
Source: Federal Election Commission

=== Results ===
General election results
Party	Candidate	Votes	%	±%
Republican	Pat Toomey	2,028,945	51.01%	−1.61%
Democratic	Joe Sestak	1,948,716	48.99%	+7.00%
Total votes		3,977,661	100.00%	N/A
Republican gain from Democratic				

==== Results by county ====
County	Pat Toomey Republican		Joe Sestak Democratic		Margin		Total votes cast
County	#	%	#	%	#	%	Total votes cast
Adams	21,567	69.3%	9,534	30.7%	12,033	38.6%	31,101
Allegheny	192,257	45.2%	232,996	54.8%	-40,739	-9.6%	425,253
Armstrong	14,693	65.3%	7,800	34.7%	6,893	30.6%	22,493
Beaver	30,136	52.4%	27,339	47.6%	2,797	4.8%	57,475
Bedford	12,315	74.9%	4,128	25.1%	8,187	49.8%	16,443
Berks	62,534	55.6%	49,971	44.4%	12,563	11.2%	112,505
Blair	24,411	68.4%	11,258	31.6%	13,153	36.8%	35,669
Bradford	12,076	70.4%	5,080	29.6%	6,996	50.8%	17,156
Bucks	121,331	53.1%	107,208	46.9%	14,123	6.2%	228,539
Butler	44,429	68.5%	20,471	31.5%	23,958	37.0%	64,900
Cambria	24,254	51.3%	23,028	48.7%	1,226	2.6%	47,282
Cameron	1,005	64.4%	556	35.6%	449	28.8%	1,561
Carbon	10,326	54.7%	8,559	45.3%	1,767	9.4%	18,885
Centre	23,111	51.7%	21,602	48.3%	1,509	3.4%	44,713
Chester	92,667	53.4%	80,738	46.6%	11,929	6.8%	173,405
Clarion	8,266	67.4%	3,999	32.6%	4,267	34.8%	12,265
Clearfield	14,798	60.4%	9,682	39.6%	5,116	20.8%	24,480
Clinton	5,409	58.7%	3,807	41.3%	1,602	17.4%	9,216
Columbia	11,287	62.2%	6,868	37.8%	4,419	24.4%	18,155
Crawford	16,725	62.6%	9,985	37.4%	6,740	25.2%	26,710
Cumberland	52,890	65.5%	27,829	34.5%	25,061	31.0%	80,719
Dauphin	49,021	55.7%	38,913	44.3%	10,108	11.4%	87,934
Delaware	88,955	43.9%	113,844	56.1%	-24,889	-12.2%	202,799
Elk	5,638	55.1%	4,591	44.9%	1,047	10.2%	10,229
Erie	38,146	44.9%	46,851	55.1%	-8,705	-10.2%	84,997
Fayette	16,960	50.2%	16,829	49.8%	131	0.4%	33,789
Forest	1,121	59.9%	750	40.1%	371	19.8%	1,871
Franklin	32,364	73.8%	11,487	26.2%	20,877	47.6%	43,851
Fulton	3,434	76.8%	1,037	23.2%	2,397	53.6%	4,471
Greene	5,502	50.1%	5,483	49.9%	19	0.2%	10,985
Huntingdon	9,134	68.4%	4,223	31.6%	4,911	36.8%	13,357
Indiana	15,133	60.0%	10,085	40.0%	5,048	20.0%	25,218
Jefferson	9,326	70.6%	3,882	29.4%	5,444	41.2%	13,208
Juniata	5,504	75.1%	1,829	24.9%	3,675	50.2%	7,333
Lackawanna	27,742	40.2%	41,327	59.8%	-13,585	-19.6%	69,069
Lancaster	102,113	68.2%	47,649	31.8%	54,464	36.4%	149,762
Lawrence	15,493	55.7%	12,317	44.3%	3,176	11.4%	27,810
Lebanon	27,881	70.2%	11,838	29.8%	16,043	40.4%	39,719
Lehigh	50,341	52.6%	45,455	47.4%	4,886	5.2%	95,796
Luzerne	45,313	49.3%	46,566	50.7%	-1,253	-1.4%	91,879
Lycoming	23,944	70.0%	10,251	30.0%	13,693	40.0%	34,195
McKean	6,801	68.6%	3,107	31.4%	3,694	37.2%	9,908
Mercer	20,095	55.7%	16,000	44.3%	4,095	11.4%	36,095
Mifflin	9,182	75.5%	2,975	24.5%	6,207	51.0%	12,157
Monroe	20,295	51.8%	18,921	48.2%	1,374	3.6%	39,216
Montgomery	131,955	45.9%	255,413	54.1%	-23,458	-8.2%	287,368
Montour	3,627	63.7%	2,068	36.3%	1,559	27.4%	5,695
Northampton	44,209	52.3%	40,321	47.7%	3,888	4.6%	84,530
Northumberland	16,032	62.0%	9,817	38.0%	6,215	24.0%	25,849
Perry	10,972	75.5%	3,566	24.5%	7,406	51.0%	14,358
Philadelphia	67,996	16.0%	357,981	84.0%	-289,985	-68.0%	425,977
Pike	9,678	63.2%	5,627	36.8%	4,051	26.4%	15,305
Potter	3,919	74.1%	1,371	25.9%	2,548	50.2%	5,290
Schuylkill	26,348	58.9%	18,378	41.1%	7,970	17.8%	44,726
Snyder	8,072	71.9%	3,148	28.1%	4,924	43.8%	11,220
Somerset	17,209	67.0%	8,488	33.0%	8,721	34.0%	25,697
Sullivan	1,561	67.4%	754	32.6%	807	34.8%	2,315
Susquehanna	9,141	65.3%	4,860	34.7%	4,281	30.6%	14,001
Tioga	8,651	72.1%	3,352	27.9%	5,299	44.2%	12,003
Union	7,618	65.2%	4,059	34.8%	3,559	30.4%	11,677
Venango	10,147	64.4%	5,597	35.6%	4,550	28.8%	15,744
Warren	7,615	62.9%	4,493	37.1%	3,122	25.8%	12,108
Washington	37,957	54.5%	31,689	45.5%	6,268	9.0%	69,646
Wayne	10,348	65.6%	5,426	34.4%	4,922	31.2%	15,774
Westmoreland	76,002	61.1%	48,338	38.9%	27,664	22.2%	124,340
Wyoming	5,569	62.9%	3,283	37.1%	2,286	25.8%	8,852
York	88,394	67.8%	42,039	32.2%	46,355	35.6%	130,433
Totals	2,028,945	51.0%	1,948,716	49.0%	80,229	2.0%	3,977,661

Counties that flipped from Democratic to Republican

- Beaver (largest city: Beaver)
- Fayette (largest borough: Uniontown)

Counties that flipped from Republican to Democratic

- Delaware (largest city: Upper Darby)
- Erie (largest city: Erie)
- Lackawanna (largest city: Scranton)
- Luzerne (largest city: Wilkes-Barre)
- Montgomery (largest city: Lower Merion)
