= 2008 Pennsylvania Republican presidential primary =

- April 22, 2008
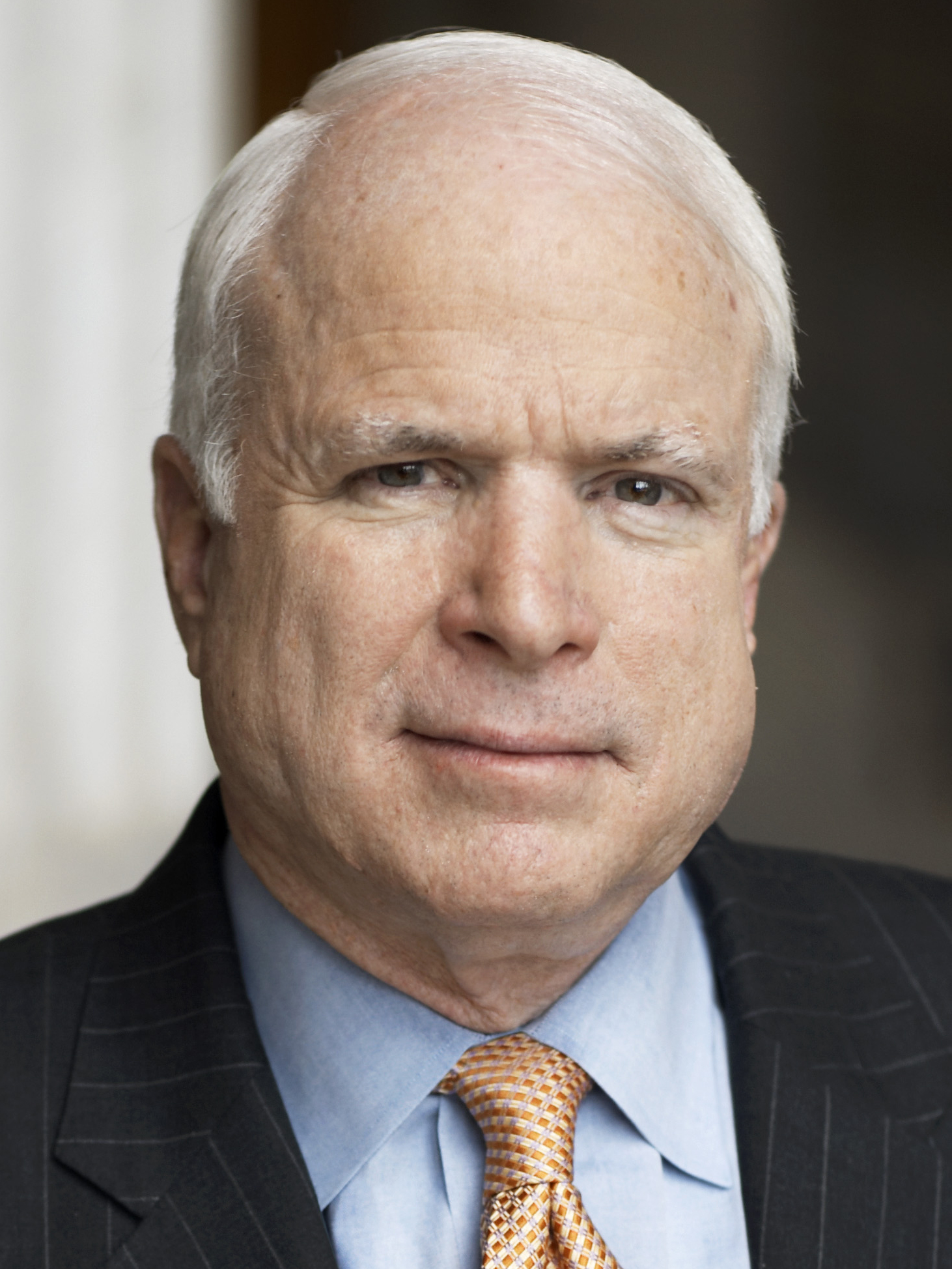

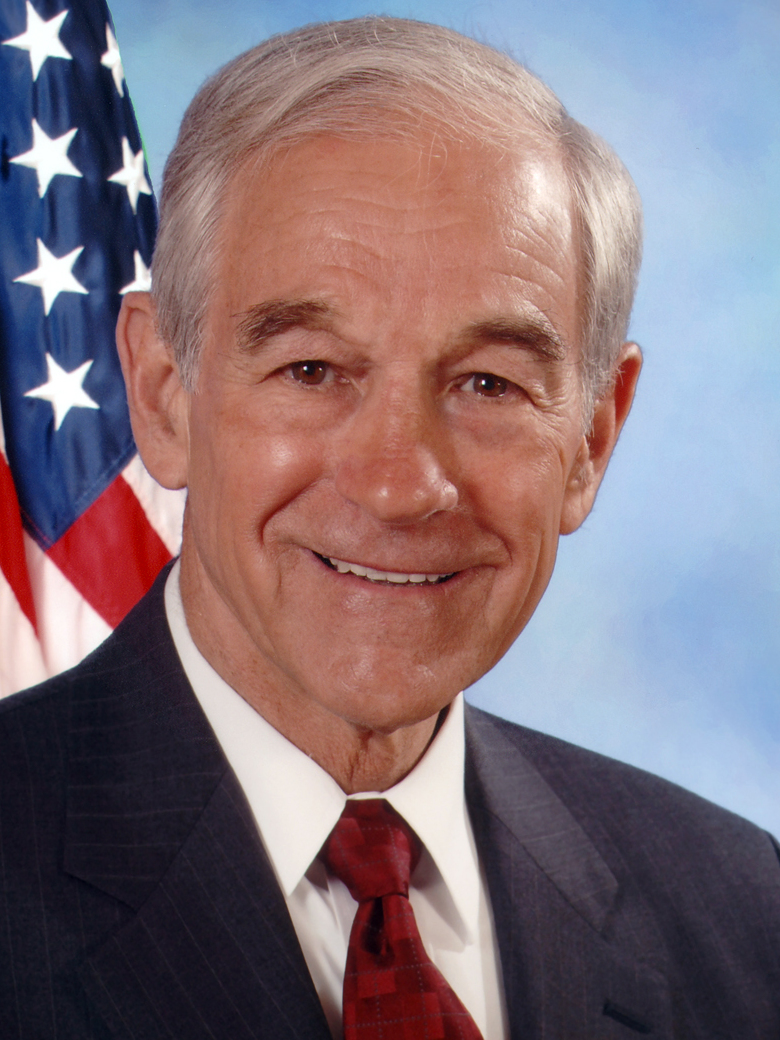

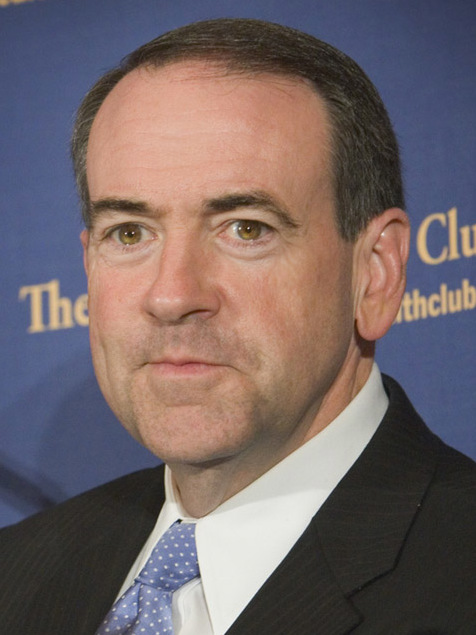
| Candidate | John McCain | Ron Paul | Mike Huckabee |
| Party | Republican | Republican | Republican |
| Home state | Arizona | Texas | Arkansas |
| Delegate count | 74 | 0 | 0 |
| Popular vote | 594,110 | 129,247 | 92,060 |
| Percentage | 71.21% | 15.49% | 11.03% |
County results, by vote share
McCain
50 – 60%
60 – 70%
70 – 80%

The 2008 Pennsylvania Republican presidential primary was an election held on April 22 by the Pennsylvania Department of State in which voters chose their preference for the Republican Party's candidate for the 2008 United States presidential election. Voters also chose the Pennsylvania Republican Party's candidates for various state and local offices.

== Background ==
The selected candidates were placed on the ballot of the 2008 General Election on November 4, 2008. The Republican primary was part of a general primary that also included the 2008 Pennsylvania Democratic presidential primary.

Polls opened at 7:00 am and closed at 8:00 pm. John McCain was the winner. He had already been declared the presumptive Republican presidential nominee, having secured enough delegate votes in earlier primary contests to win the nomination at the 2008 Republican National Convention.

== Campaigning ==
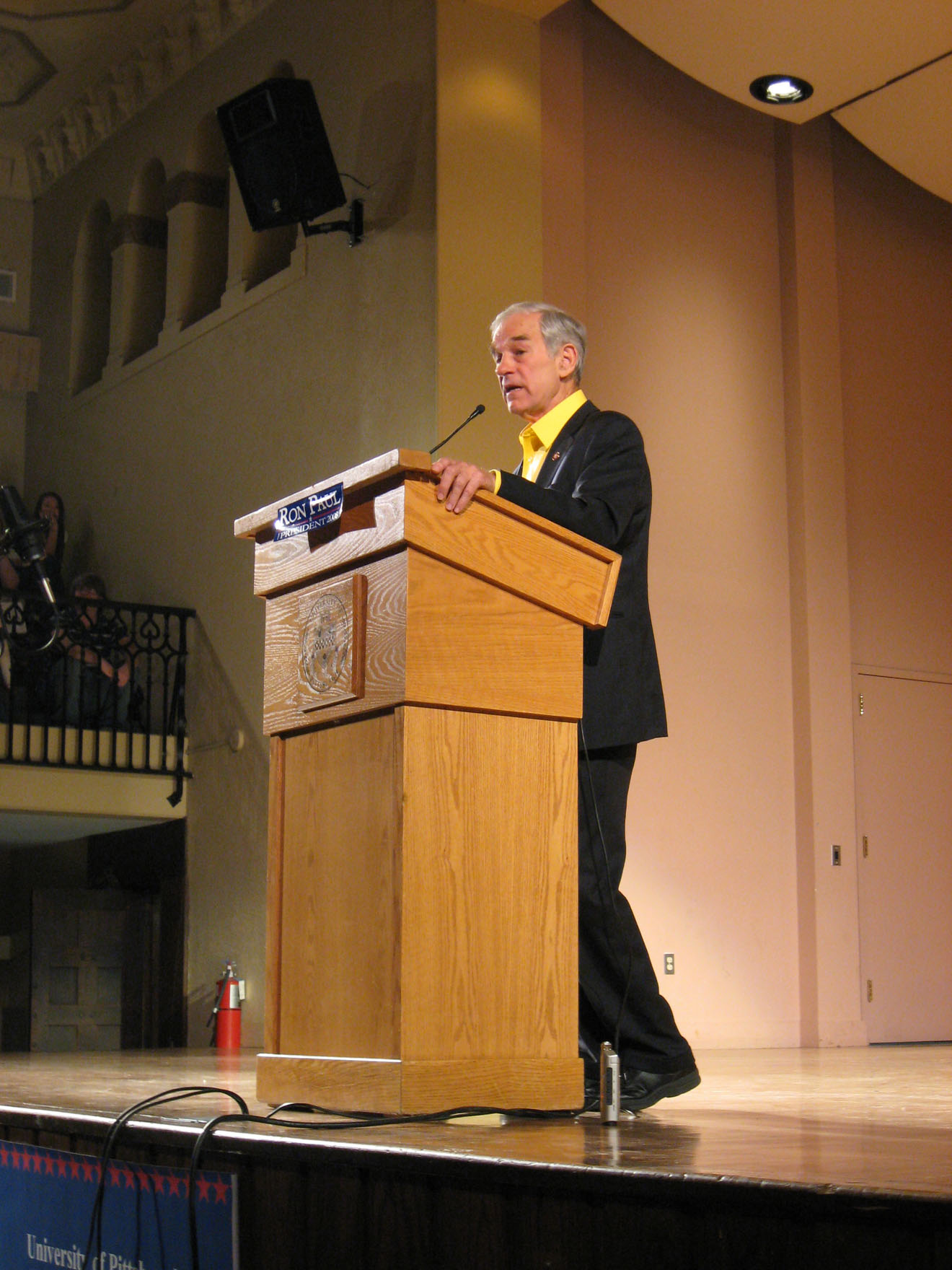
Ron Paul delivers a speech at the University of Pittsburgh on April 3, 2008.

Unlike on the Democratic side, little campaigning took place as John McCain had already clinched the nomination. Outsider candidate Ron Paul made several stops in the state, including his birthplace of Pittsburgh.

== Results ==
Official Results
| Candidate | Votes | Percentage | Delegates |
|---|---|---|---|
| John McCain | 594,110 | 71.21% | 74* |
| Ron Paul | 129,247 | 15.49% | 0 |
| Mike Huckabee** | 92,060 | 11.03% | 0 |
| Write-ins | 18,473 | 2.21% | 0 |
| Mitt Romney** | 268 | 0.03% | 0 |
| Fred Thompson** | 48 | 0.01% | 0 |
| Duncan Hunter** | 26 | 0.00% | 0 |
| Alan Keyes** | 22 | 0.00% | 0 |
| Rudy Giuliani** | 12 | 0.00% | 0 |
| Tom Tancredo** | 1 | 0.00% | 0 |
| Sam Brownback** | 1 | 0.00% | 0 |
| Total | 834,268 | 100% | 74 |

*Delegates are essentially unpledged in the Pennsylvania Republican primary.

**Candidate had already dropped out of the race prior to primary.

Some media sources noted that Ron Paul and Mike Huckabee combined took in around 220,000 votes (about 27% of the vote total), despite McCain's status as presumptive nominee and the statistical irrelevance of Pennsylvania, as a possible sign of continuing social conservative or libertarian unease with McCain's nomination and have speculated about whether these results could potentially affect McCain in the November general election. Although some strategists disputed this theory, pointing to low turnout among McCain supporters and arguing that primary results would not necessarily affect the result in November.

== See also ==
- 2008 Pennsylvania Democratic presidential primary
- 2008 Republican Party presidential primaries
