= John Baer (journalist) =

American journalist (1947–2026)

John M. Baer (June 25, 1947 – September 24, 2026) was an American political columnist, initially with The Philadelphia Daily News and Philadelphia Inquirer, then latterly with the Harrisburg Patriot-News and PennLive.

== Early life and education ==
Baer was born in Harrisburg, Pennsylvania, on June 25, 1947. His father, John H. Baer, was a political reporter for what became the Patriot-News. John M. Baer was a graduate of Mount St. Mary's University and held a master's degree from Temple University. He studied at the Brookings Institution and worked in the U.S. Congress as a Fellow of the American Political Science Association. He also was a Fellow of the Loyola Law School's inaugural Journalist Law School program in Los Angeles.

== Career ==
Baer spent 32 years with the Philadelphia Daily News and Philadelphia Inquirer before joining the Harrisburg Patriot-News/PennLive in 2019. He won numerous awards for political columns over the years, including from the Associated Press Managing Editors, The Pennsylvania News Media Association, the Pennsylvania Bar Association, Pennsylvania Common Cause and the Pennsylvania Society of Professional Journalists.

In 2002, the National Journal named him one of the top 10 political journalists outside Washington, DC. In 2005, he was named one of "Pennsylvania's Most Influential Reporters" by the Pennsylvania political news website PoliticsPA. In 2015, he received The Ben Franklin Award for Excellence from the Pennsylvania News Media Association. In 2024, he was inducted into the Pennsylvania News Media Hall of Fame.

== Death ==
John Baer died under hospice care at his home in New Cumberland, Pennsylvania, on September 24, 2026, at the age of 79.
