= 2004 Pennsylvania Democratic presidential primary =

- April 27, 2004

178 Democratic National Convention delegates (151 pledged, 27 unpledged) The number of pledged delegates received is determined by the popular vote
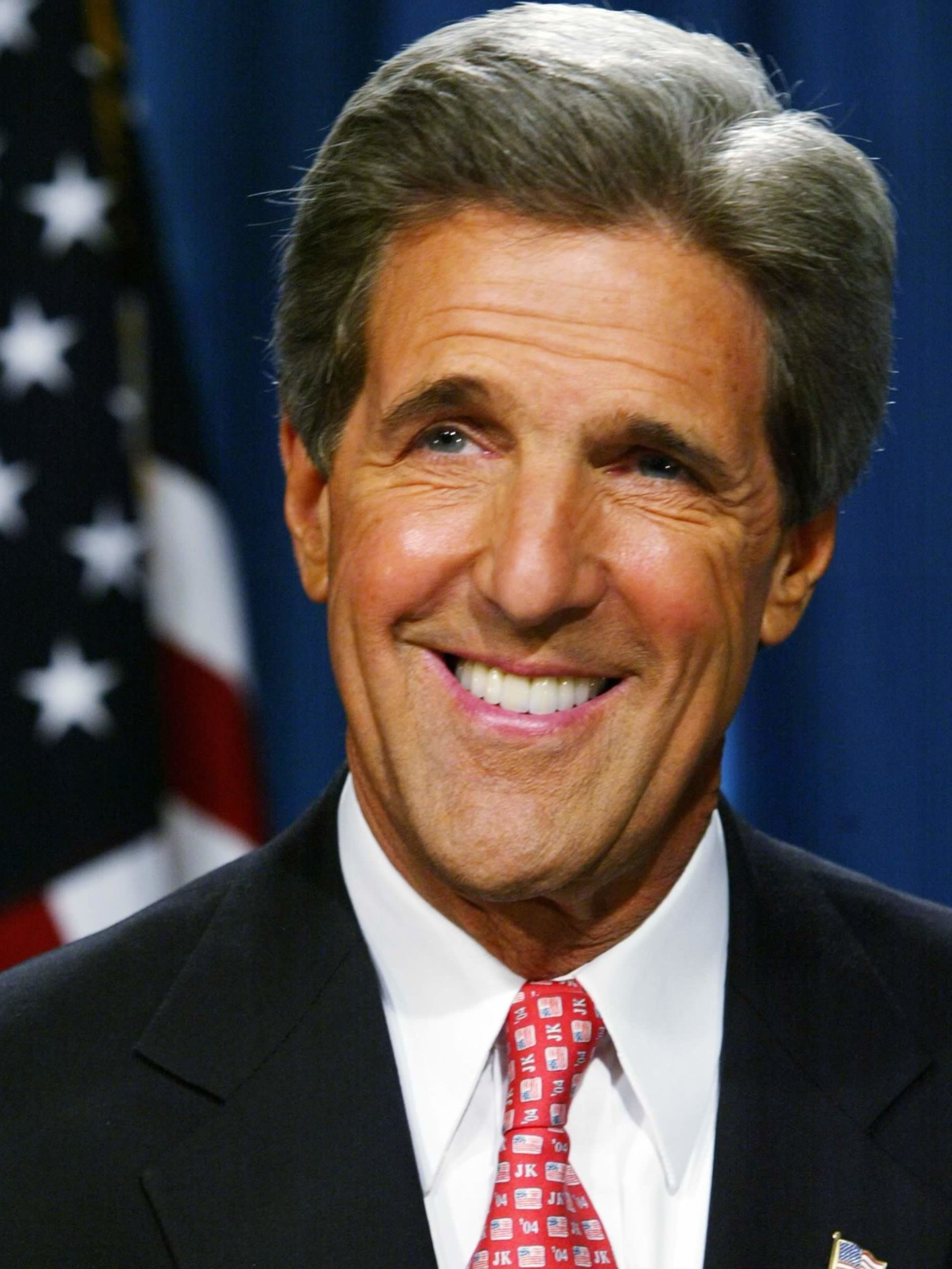

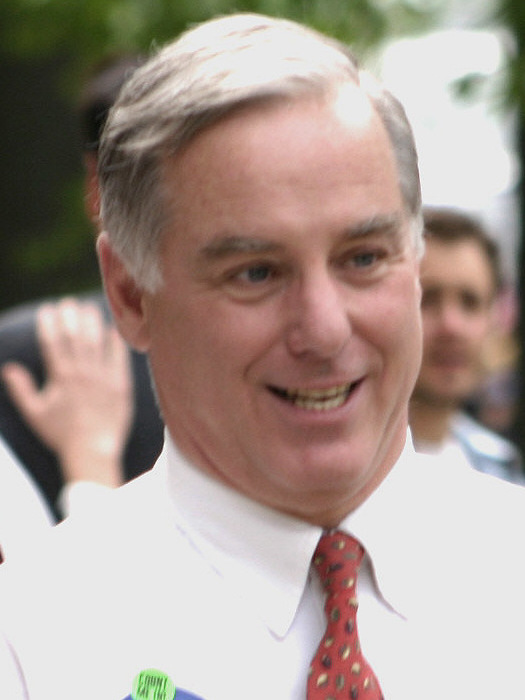

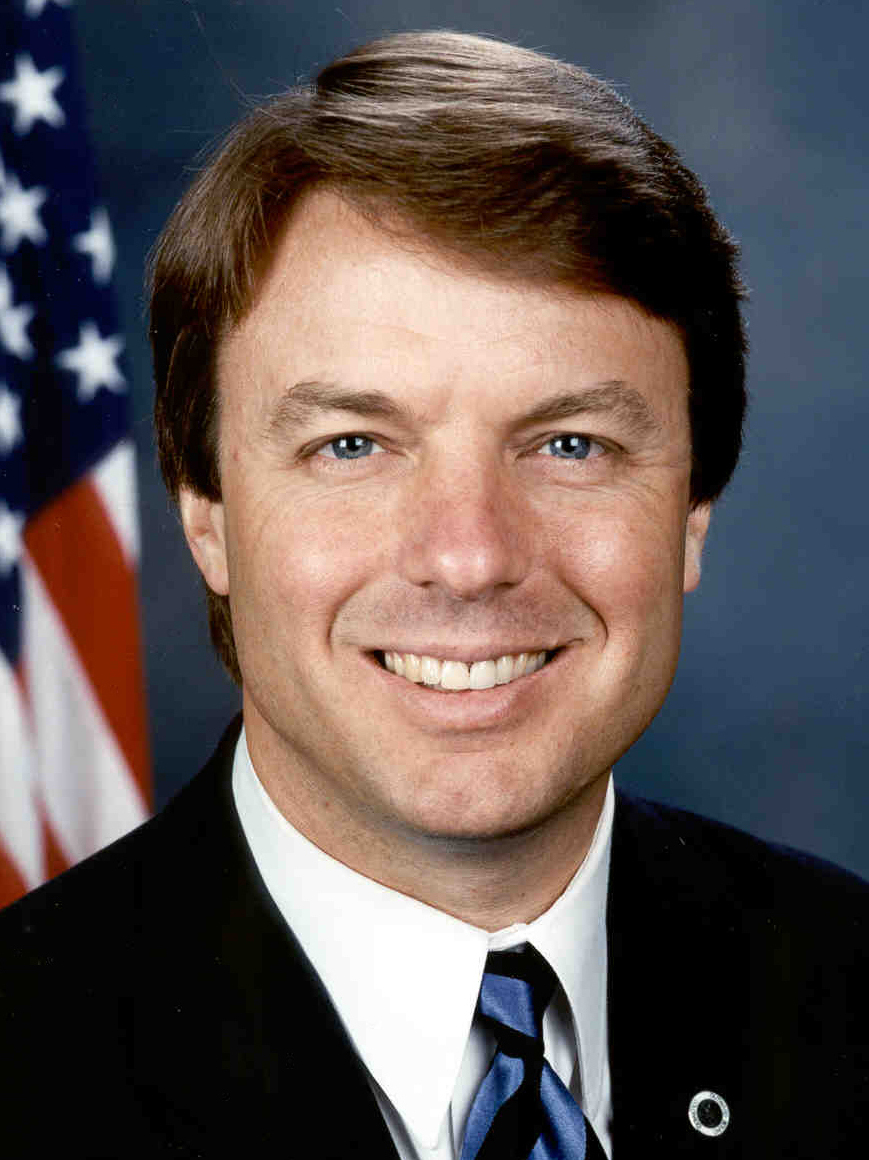
Candidate	John Kerry	Howard Dean (withdrawn)	John Edwards (withdrawn)
Home state	Massachusetts	Vermont	North Carolina
Delegate count	150	1	0
Popular vote	585,683	79,799	76,762
Percentage	74.15%	10.10%	9.72%
- County results Kerry: 55–60% 60–65% 65–70% 70–75% 75–80%

The 2004 Pennsylvania Democratic presidential primary took place on April 27, 2004. It was open to registered Democrats only.

== Eligibility ==
In order to vote in the primary, one must be:

1. "A citizen of the United States for at least one month before the next primary, special, municipal, or general election."
2. "A resident of Pennsylvania and the election district in which the individual desires to register and vote for at least 30 days before the next primary, special, municipal, or general election."
3. "At least 18 years of age on or before the day of the next primary, special, municipal, or general election."
4. A registered Democrat

Convicted felons may not vote from prison and may not register to vote for five years after being released from prison.

== Registration ==
Individuals may register to vote at County Voter Registration offices, through the mail, at a Department of Transportation office, or at various other government agency offices.

Voters must register 30 days prior to the election in order to be eligible to vote; for the 2008 Democratic primary, this means that March 24 is the last day to register.

== Results ==
100% of precincts reporting
Candidate	Votes	Percentage	Delegates
John Kerry	585,683	74.1%	150
Howard Dean	79,799	10.1%	1
John Edwards	76,762	9.7%	0
Dennis Kucinich	30,110	3.8%	0
Lyndon LaRouche	17,528	2.2%	0
Uncommitted	-	2.2%	27
Total	789,882	100%	178

Note: Twenty seven delegates remained uncommitted until they reached the floor of the convention. Kerry eventually received all 178 delegates from Pennsylvania.

== See also ==
- 2004 Democratic Party presidential primaries
- 2008 Pennsylvania Democratic presidential primary
