= 2008 Pennsylvania Democratic presidential primary =

- April 22, 2008

187 Democratic National Convention delegates (158 pledged, 29 unpledged)

Candidate	Hillary Clinton	Barack Obama
Home state	New York	Illinois
Delegate count	85	73
Popular vote	1,273,764	1,059,698
Percentage	54.59%	45.41%
- County results Clinton: 50–60% 60–70% 70–80% Obama: 50–60% 60–70%

The 2008 Pennsylvania Democratic presidential primary was held on April 22 by the Pennsylvania Department of State in which voters chose their preference for the Democratic Party's candidate for the 2008 United States presidential election. Voters also chose the Pennsylvania Democratic Party's candidates for various state and local offices. The selected candidates were placed on the ballot of the 2008 general election on November 4. The Democratic primary was part of a general primary that also included the 2008 Pennsylvania Republican presidential primary.

The Democratic primary was open to registered Democrats only. Polls opened at 7am and closed at 8pm. Senators Barack Obama and Hillary Clinton were the only candidates on the ballot for President of the United States. The primary was considered to be a "must win" for Clinton, who defeated Obama, but by a smaller margin than hoped for.

== Delegate breakdown ==
The Pennsylvania Democratic Party sent a total of 187 delegates to the 2008 Democratic National Convention. Of those delegates, 158 were pledged, and 29 were unpledged. All of the 158 pledged delegates were allocated (pledged) to vote for a particular candidate at the National Convention according to the results of the Pennsylvania presidential primary. The 29 unpledged delegates were popularly called "superdelegates" because their vote represented their personal decisions, whereas the regular delegates' votes represented the collective decision of many voters. The superdelegates were free to vote for any candidate at the National Convention and were selected by the Pennsylvania Democratic Party's officials.

The 158 pledged delegates were further divided into 103 district delegates and 55 statewide delegates. The 103 district delegates were divided among Pennsylvania's 19 congressional districts and were allocated to the presidential candidates based on the primary results in each district. The 55 statewide delegates were divided into 35 at-large delegates and 20 party leaders and elected officials (abbreviated PLEOs). They were allocated to the presidential candidates based on the preference of the delegates at the State Committee meeting on June 7.

Of the 29 unpledged delegates, 26 were selected in advance and 3 were selected at the State Committee meeting. The delegates selected in advance were 13 Democratic National Committee members, the 11 Democratic U.S. representatives from Pennsylvania, Democratic U.S. Senator Bob Casey Jr., and Democratic Governor Ed Rendell.

== Importance of Pennsylvania ==
The primary was the first time since 1976 that Pennsylvania played a major role in a presidential nomination.

=== Importance of Pennsylvania for Clinton ===
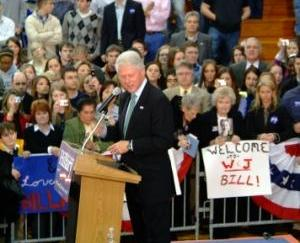
Former president Bill Clinton at a "Solutions for America" rally at the Henry Memorial Center at Washington & Jefferson College on March 11, 2008

As the race continued to Pennsylvania, Indiana, and North Carolina, many observers had concluded that Clinton had little chance to overcome Obama's lead in pledged delegates.

Former President Bill Clinton highlighted the importance of the state for the Clinton campaign saying on March 11 at an event in Western Pennsylvania that "If she wins a big, big victory in Pennsylvania, I think it'll give her a real big boost going into the next primaries... I think she's got to win a big victory in Pennsylvania. I think if she does, she can be nominated, but it's up to you." This was a repetition of his tactic before March 4, warning supporters that his wife might not be able to continue if she did not win Ohio and Texas. Hillary Clinton emphasized that Pennsylvania was something of a home state for her, as her father came from Scranton, Pennsylvania, she and her brothers were christened there and had vacationed near there each summer, and her brothers still maintained the family cottage near there.

=== Importance of Pennsylvania to Obama ===
On March 18, 2008 Barack Obama chose Philadelphia as the site to deliver his much-anticipated "A More Perfect Union" speech dealing with the race and the controversy surrounding his pastor, Rev. Jeremiah Wright.

== Campaign ==
=== Obama's "Road to Change" bus tour ===
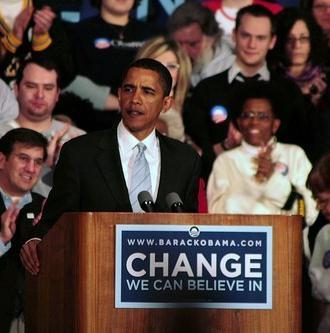
Obama speaking at a Rally in Pittsburgh to kick off his statewide bus tour.

Obama started a 6-day "Road to Change" bus tour across Pennsylvania, with stops in Pittsburgh, Johnstown, Altoona, State College, Harrisburg

On March 28, Obama started the bus tour with a rally in Pittsburgh's Soldiers and Sailors Memorial Hall. Obama was introduced and endorsed by Senator Bob Casey Jr., who had indicated earlier that he would remain neutral in the democratic primary.

Casey traveled to Florida over the Easter holiday, where he said rain forced him to stay inside and think about the election. Obama's ability to "transcend" the racial divide and his ability to engage younger voters proved decisive to his decision. According to sources, Casey's four daughters lobbied their dad to endorse Obama.

On March 29, the Obama bus tour stopped at the Pleasant Valley Recreation Center in Altoona, where he famously bowled a 37. Both Obama and Senator Casey (who rolled a score of 71) lost to local homemaker Roxanne Hart, who rolled a score of 82. On April Fool's Day, Senator Clinton jokingly challenged Obama to a "bowl-off," with the winner taking all the delegates.

== Controversy ==
On April 11, 2008, The Huffington Post blogger Mayhill Fowler, a self-admitted Barack Obama supporter, reported that during an April 6 "closed press" fundraising event in San Francisco, California, Obama recounted the obstacles facing his campaign in the Pennsylvania primary as it pertained to rural, white voters. Fowler wrote that during the speech, Obama said the following:

You go into these small towns in Pennsylvania and, like a lot of small towns in the Midwest, the jobs have been gone now for 25 years and nothing's replaced them... And they fell through the Clinton Administration, and the Bush Administration, and each successive administration has said that somehow these communities are gonna regenerate and they have not. And it's not surprising then they get bitter, they cling to guns or religion or antipathy to people who aren't like them or anti-immigrant sentiment or anti-trade sentiment as a way to explain their frustrations.

Fowler later posted a three-minute, 30-second audio snippet confirming the accuracy of the remark. Senators Clinton and John McCain both issued statements condemning the remarks. Obama later defended his comments, but conceded: "I didn't say it as well as I should have." However, he also added: "I said something that everybody knows is true." Obama had addressed similar themes of guns, religion, and economics in 2004 during an interview with Charlie Rose.

== Final week ==
On the last Friday before the primary, Senator Obama spoke on Independence Mall in Philadelphia, Pennsylvania, to a crowd of more than 35,000, the largest audience yet drawn by either candidate during the campaign. The crowd was nearly twice what had been projected and spilled over into nearby streets. The next day, Obama conducted a whistle stop train tour from Philadelphia to Harrisburg, drawing a crowd of 6,000 at a stop in Wynnewood and 3,000 at a stop in Paoli. On Monday, Sen. Obama held the final events of his Pennsylvania campaign in Scranton, McKeesport and at the University of Pittsburgh's Petersen Events Center.

The Saturday before the primary, Senator Clinton spoke in five Pennsylvania cities, including West Chester and York, Pennsylvania. More than 300 people showed up at the West Chester firehouse to hear the New York Senator speak. At the Wilson high gymnasium in West Lawn, Pennsylvania, Clinton told several hundred more supporters: "The job of a leader is to bring people together to solve problems . . . to understand that sometimes we have to fight to get the political will and the votes to make that happen". On Monday, April 21, Senator Clinton along with husband Bill Clinton spoke to a crowd of 6,000 in Downtown Pittsburgh. Other events were held Monday in Scranton, Harrisburg, and Philadelphia. Both candidates refused to participate in the political custom of street money.

== Polls ==
Public opinion polling from early January 2007 through mid-February 2008 consistently gave Hillary Clinton a double digit lead over Barack Obama. By the beginning of April, polls of Pennsylvanians showed Obama trailing Clinton by an average of 5 points. According to 2 polls taken one day before the primary, Hillary Clinton was leading Barack Obama by 49%-42% and 51%-41%. Other polls showed Clinton leading by an average of about 6%.

Some superdelegates also announced their preferred candidates before the primary. As of April 30, 16 superdelegates had announced support for Senator Clinton and 5 had announced support for Senator Obama.

== Results ==
Primary date: April 22, 2008

National pledged delegates determined: 158

Pennsylvania Democratic presidential primary, 2008 Official Results
Candidate	Votes	Percentage	Estimated national delegates
Hillary Clinton	1,273,764	54.59%	85
Barack Obama	1,059,698	45.41%	73
Totals	2,333,462	100.0%	158

In the end, Hillary Clinton won the primary by 9.28 percentage points, a wider margin than expected than recent polls suggested, but smaller than most January and February polls. Despite her victory, she gained only nine delegates on Obama. In particular superdelegates were not swinging in her direction after her win; the Clintons had been trying to secure the support of Congressman Jason Altmire but he remained uncommitted after she won his district by 31 percentage points during the primary.

== Analysis ==
2008 Pennsylvania Democratic presidential primary
Demographic subgroup	Clinton	Obama	% of total vote
Total vote	55	45	100
Sex by race
White men	53	46	34
White women	64	36	47
Black men	4	96	5
Black women	11	89	8
Age
17–29 years old	38	62	12
30–44 years old	46	54	19
45–59 years old	53	46	37
60 and older	59	40	36
Education
High school graduate	64	36	23
Some college or associate degree	51	49	25
College graduate	46	53	21
Postgraduate study	48	52	26
Party
Democrat	54	46	82
Independent or something else	46	53	14
Political philosophy
Liberal	48	52	49
Moderate	58	41	40
Conservative	51	48	10
Which issue is the most important facing the country?
The economy	56	44	55
The war in Iraq	44	56	28
Health care	54	46	14

== See also ==
- 2004 Pennsylvania Democratic presidential primary
- 2008 Pennsylvania Republican presidential primary
- 2008 Democratic Party presidential primaries
