= Street money =

American political tactic

Street money (also called walking-around money) is an American political tactic where local party officials are given legal cash handouts by an electoral candidate's campaign in exchange for the officials' support in turning out voters on election day.

== Usage ==
The money given out to ward leaders and party foot soldiers can range from $10, $20 or $50 to as high as $400. Ward bosses in the city's poorer neighborhoods often use the money to offset the costs of gasoline and food for their volunteers. Although most well known in Philadelphia, Pennsylvania, street money is also common in Chicago, Baltimore, Newark and Los Angeles. In Baltimore, the term "walk around money" means street money.

== History ==
During the 1997 Camden, New Jersey City Council race, the Camden City Democratic Committee spent $10,765 to pay street workers $40 each to "get out the vote". Others have included Jon Corzine (whose campaign paid out $75 apiece to New Jersey party officials during his successful 2000 Senate bid), John Kerry (in Pennsylvania during the 2004 presidential election) and Robert A. Brady (during the 2002 U.S. House race).

After the 1993 New Jersey gubernatorial campaign, Republican Christine Todd Whitman's campaign manager Ed Rollins was accused of boasting that he had given $500,000 in street money to black churches in New Jersey in exchange for their keeping their congregation from voting for incumbent James Florio. Rollins later retracted his claims, saying that his comments were taken out of context. Subsequent investigations by the New Jersey Attorney General's Office and Federal Bureau of Investigation found no wrongdoing on Rollins' part, finding that his original claims were braggadocio.

During the 2008 Pennsylvania Democratic primary, both Barack Obama and Hillary Clinton refused to hand out street money, Governor of Pennsylvania Ed Rendell commented that the unusual amount of interest in the race would bring people out in support of both candidates, street money or not. Rendell later remarked that the Clinton campaign had "barely enough [money] to communicate on basic media", much less for street money.
