= Becky Corbin =

American politician

Member of the Pennsylvania House of Representatives from the 155th district
- In office January 1, 2013 – November 30, 2018
- Preceded by: Curt Schroder
- Succeeded by: Danielle Friel Otten

Personal details
- Born: November 18, 1952 (age 73)
- Party: Republican
- Spouse: Michael
- Children: Alicia and John
- Education: Chatham College
- Occupation: Legislator
- Website: Pennsylvania State Representative Becky Corbin

Becky Corbin is a former member of the Pennsylvania House of Representatives. She represented the 155th district until her unsuccessful bid for re-election in 2018. She is a member of the Republican Party.

== Career ==
Prior to her time in the House, Corbin served as a legislative aide for former State Representatives Curt Schroder and Jim Gerlach.

She began her involvement in public service in 1997 when she was appointed as a member of the East Brandywine Township Zoning Hearing Board. Corbin is the Commissioner for the Brandywine Regional Police Department since 2002. In 2011, Corbin was elected Auditor of East Brandywine Township.

== Personal ==
Corbin serves on the Board of Directors of Downingtown Thorndale Regional Chamber of Commerce. She is a current member of the Operation Military Christmas Committee, and the East Brandywine Township Bondsville Mill Committee. Corbin was a member of the Downingtown Keystone Opportunity Zone and was a Charter Member of the Downingtown Education Foundation Board of Trustees.

Corbin holds a Bachelor of Science degree in chemistry from Chatham College.

She and her husband, Michael, reside in East Brandywine Township, Chester County, Pennsylvania. They have two adult children, Alicia and John and two grandchildren.

Pennsylvania House of Representatives
| Preceded by Curt Schroder | Member of the Pennsylvania House of Representatives for the 155th District; 2013–2018 | Succeeded by Danielle Friel Otten |
