= E. Raymond Lynch =

American politician (1922–2013)

Member of the Pennsylvania House of Representatives from the 155th district
- In office January 2, 1979 – November 30, 1980
- Preceded by: Samuel Morris
- Succeeded by: Samuel Morris

Personal details
- Born: December 12, 1922 Philadelphia, Pennsylvania, United States
- Died: October 23, 2013 (aged 90) Chester Springs, Pennsylvania
- Party: Republican

Edward Raymond Lynch (December 12, 1922 – October 23, 2013) was a Republican member of the Pennsylvania House of Representatives.
