= 2002 United States House of Representatives elections in Pennsylvania =

- November 5, 2002

All 19 Pennsylvania seats to the United States House of Representatives
	Majority party	Minority party
Party	Republican	Democratic
Last election	11	10
Seats won	12	7
Seat change	▲1	▼3
Popular vote	1,859,270	1,348,665
Percentage	56.19%	40.76%
Swing	▲7.29%	▼9.24%

Republican hold Republican gain
Democratic hold
Republican
50–60%
60–70%
70–80%
80–90%
>90%
Democratic
40–50%
50–60%
60–70%
70–80%
80–90%
>90%

The 2002 United States House elections in Pennsylvania was an election for Pennsylvania's delegation to the United States House of Representatives, which occurred as part of the general election of the House of Representatives on November 5, 2002.

The election between George Gekas and Tim Holden was described as "PA's most exciting match-up" by the political website PoliticsPA.

== Overview ==
United States House of Representatives elections in Pennsylvania, 2002
Party	Votes	Percentage	Seats Before	Seats After	+/–
Republican	1,859,270	56.19%	11	12	+1
Democratic	1,348,665	40.76%	10	7	-3
Green	63,357	1.91%	0	0	0
Libertarian	24,086	0.73%	0	0	0
Constitution	10,393	0.31%	0	0	0
Reform	3,304	0.10%	0	0	0
Totals	3,309,075	100.00%	21	19	-2

=== Match-up summary ===
District	Democratic		Republican		Others		Total		Result
District	Votes	%	Votes	%	Votes	%	Votes	%	Result
District 1	121,076	86.43%	17,444	12.45%	1,570	1.12%	140,090	100.00%	Democratic hold
District 2	150,623	87.77%	20,988	12.23%	0	0.00%	171,611	100.00%	Democratic hold
District 3	0	0.00%	116,763	77.68%	33,554	22.32%	150,317	100.00%	Republican hold
District 4	71,674	35.45%	130,534	64.55%	0	0.00%	202,208	100.00%	Republican hold
District 5	0	0.00%	124,942	87.36%	18,078	12.64%	143,020	100.00%	Republican hold
District 6	98,128	48.63%	103,648	51.37%	0	0.00%	201,776	100.00%	Republican gain
District 7	75,055	33.91%	146,296	66.09%	0	0.00%	221,351	100.00%	Republican hold
District 8	76,178	37.41%	127,475	62.59%	0	0.00%	203,653	100.00%	Republican hold
District 9	50,558	28.93%	124,184	71.07%	0	0.00%	174,742	100.00%	Republican hold
District 10	0	0.00%	152,017	92.90%	11,613	7.10%	163,630	100.00%	Republican hold
District 11	93,758	55.61%	71,543	42.43%	3,304	1.96%	168,605	100.00%	Democratic hold
District 12	124,201	73.48%	44,818	26.52%	0	0.00%	169,019	100.00%	Democratic hold
District 13	107,945	50.95%	100,295	47.34%	3,627	1.71%	211,867	100.00%	Democratic hold
District 14	123,323	100.00%	0	0.00%	0	0.00%	123,323	100.00%	Democratic hold
District 15	73,212	42.64%	98,493	57.36%	0	0.00%	171,705	100.00%	Republican hold
District 16	0	0.00%	119,046	88.49%	15,486	11.51%	134,532	100.00%	Republican hold
District 17	103,483	51.41%	97,802	48.59%	0	0.00%	201,285	100.00%	Democratic hold
District 18	79,451	39.86%	119,885	60.14%	0	0.00%	199,336	100.00%	Republican gain
District 19	0	0.00%	143,097	91.14%	13,908	8.86%	157,005	100.00%	Republican hold
Total	1,348,665	40.76%	1,859,270	56.19%	101,140	3.05%	3,309,075	100.00%	

Popular vote
Republican	56.19%
Democratic	40.76%
Other	3.05%

House seats
Republican	63.16%
Democratic	36.84%

== District 1 ==
2002 Pennsylvania's 1st congressional district election
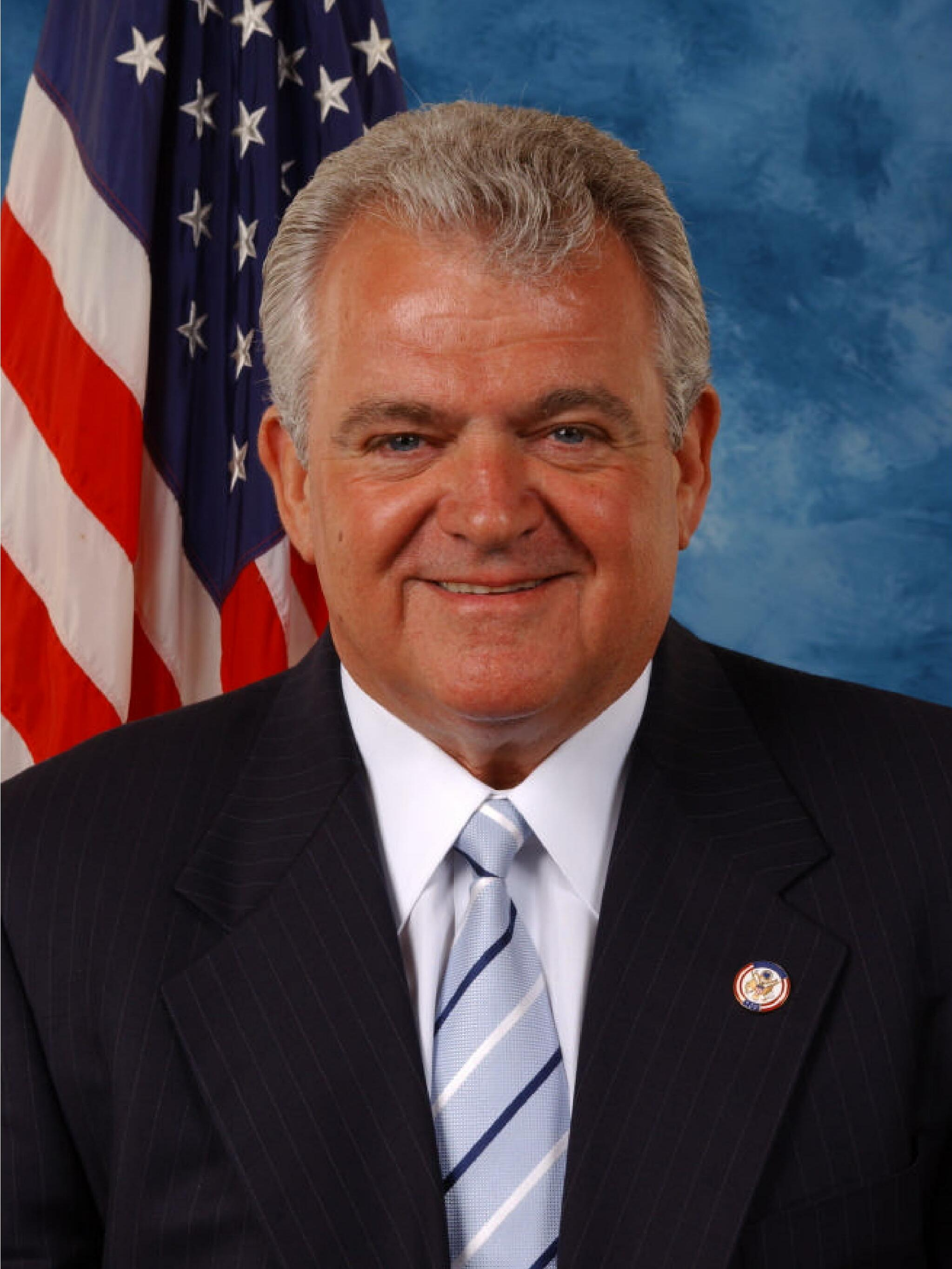

Nominee	Bob Brady	Marie Delany
Party	Democratic	Republican
Popular vote	121,076	17,444
Percentage	86.43%	12.45%
- County results Brady: 70–80% 80–90%
U.S. representative before election
Bob Brady
Democratic
Elected U.S. representative
Bob Brady
Democratic

=== Democratic primary ===
==== Candidates ====
===== Nominee =====
- Bob Brady, incumbent U.S. Representative

==== Primary results ====
Democratic primary results
Party	Candidate	Votes	%
Democratic	Bob Brady (incumbent)	75,798	100.00
Total votes		75,798	100.00

=== Republican primary ===
==== Candidates ====
===== Nominee =====
- Marie G. Delany

==== Primary results ====
Republican primary results
Party	Candidate	Votes	%
Republican	Marie G. Delany	7,208	100.00
Total votes		7,208	100.00

=== General election ===
==== Predictions ====
Source	Ranking	As of
Sabato's Crystal Ball	Safe D	November 4, 2002
New York Times	Safe D	October 14, 2002

==== Results ====
General Election 2002: Pennsylvania's 1st congressional district
Party	Candidate	Votes	%
Democratic	Bob Brady (incumbent)	121,076	86.43
Republican	Marie G. Delany	17,444	12.45
Green	Mike Ewall	1,570	1.12
Total votes		140,090	100.00

== District 2 ==
2002 Pennsylvania's 2nd congressional district election
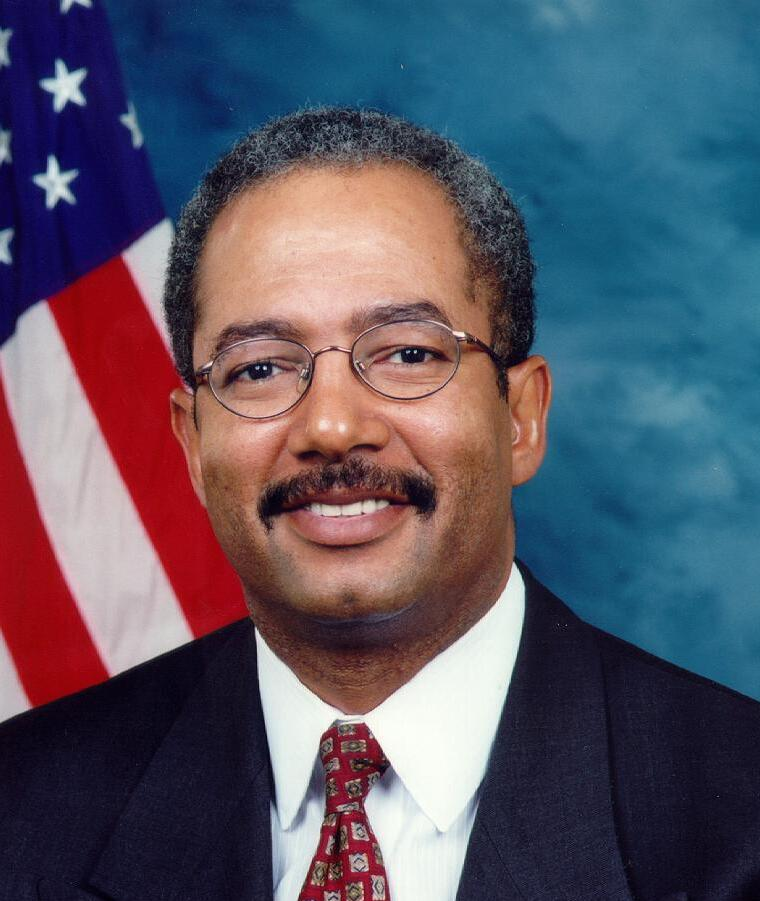

Nominee	Chaka Fattah	Thomas Dougherty
Party	Democratic	Republican
Popular vote	150,623	20,988
Percentage	87.77%	12.23%
- County results Fattah: 70–80% 80–90%
U.S. representative before election
Chaka Fattah
Democratic
Elected U.S. representative
Chaka Fattah
Democratic

=== Democratic primary ===
==== Candidates ====
===== Nominee =====
- Chaka Fattah, incumbent U.S. Representative

==== Primary results ====
Democratic primary results
Party	Candidate	Votes	%
Democratic	Chaka Fattah (incumbent)	108,589	100.00
Total votes		108,589	100.00

=== Republican primary ===
==== Candidates ====
===== Nominee =====
- Thomas G. Dougherty

==== Primary results ====
Republican primary results
Party	Candidate	Votes	%
Republican	Thomas G. Dougherty	5,545	100.00
Total votes		5,545	100.00

=== General election ===
==== Predictions ====
Source	Ranking	As of
Sabato's Crystal Ball	Safe D	November 4, 2002
New York Times	Safe D	October 14, 2002

==== Results ====
General Election 2002: Pennsylvania's 2nd congressional district
Party	Candidate	Votes	%
Democratic	Chaka Fattah (incumbent)	150,623	87.77
Republican	Thomas G. Dougherty	20,988	12.23
Total votes		171,611	100.00

== District 3 ==
2002 Pennsylvania's 3rd congressional district election
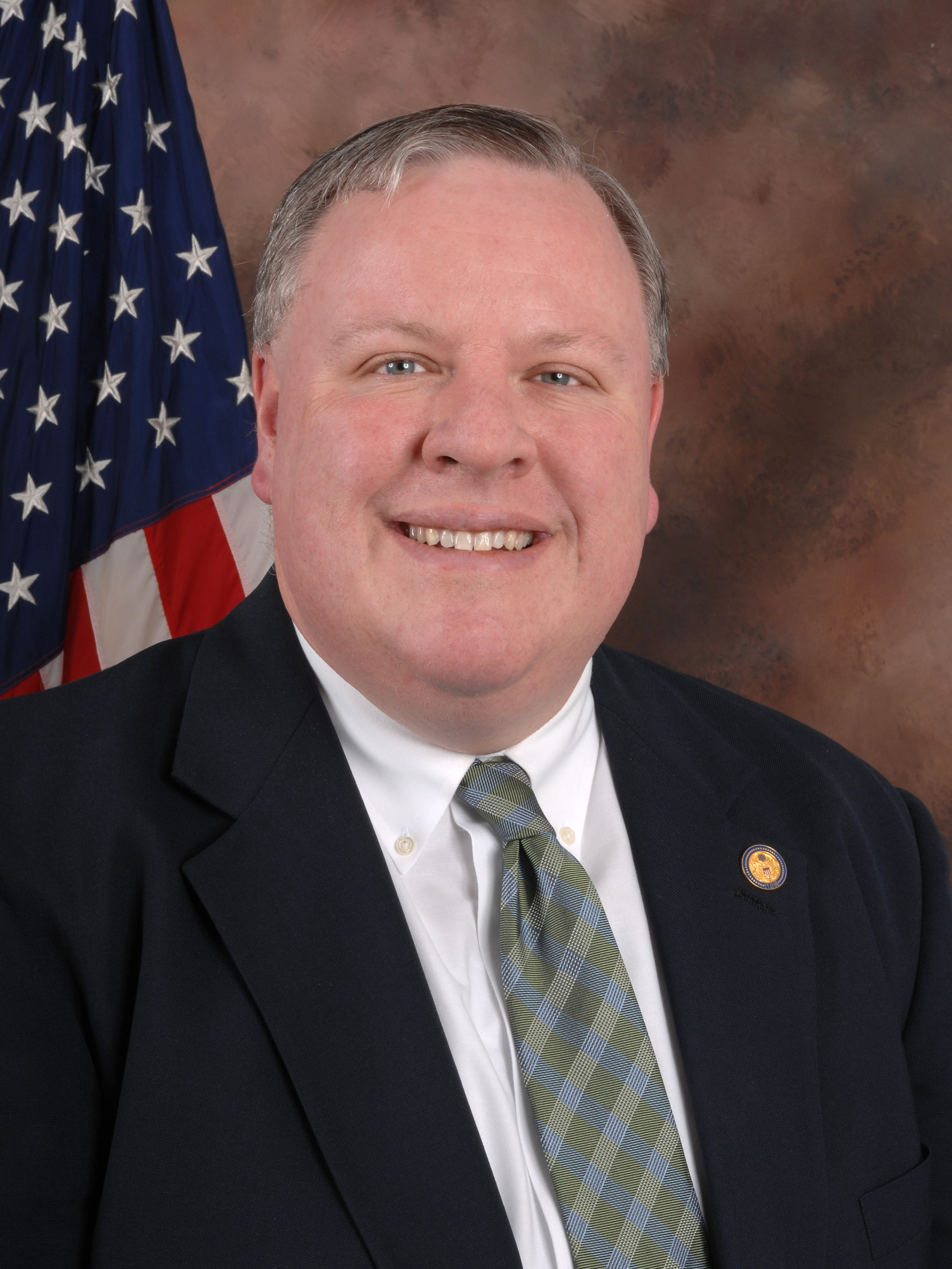

Nominee	Phil English	Anndrea Benson
Party	Republican	Green
Popular vote	116,763	33,554
Percentage	77.68%	22.32%
- County results English: 70–80% 80–90%
U.S. representative before election
Phil English
Republican
Elected U.S. representative
Phil English
Republican

=== Republican primary ===
==== Candidates ====
===== Nominee =====
- Phil English, incumbent U.S. Representative

==== Primary results ====
Republican primary results
Party	Candidate	Votes	%
Republican	Phil English (incumbent)	29,803	100.00
Total votes		29,803	100.00

=== General election ===
==== Predictions ====
Source	Ranking	As of
Sabato's Crystal Ball	Safe R	November 4, 2002
New York Times	Safe R	October 14, 2002

==== Results ====
General Election 2002: Pennsylvania's 3rd congressional district
Party	Candidate	Votes	%
Republican	Phil English (incumbent)	116,763	77.68
Green	Anndrea M. Benson	33,554	22.32
Total votes		150,317	100.00

== District 4 ==
2002 Pennsylvania's 4th congressional district election
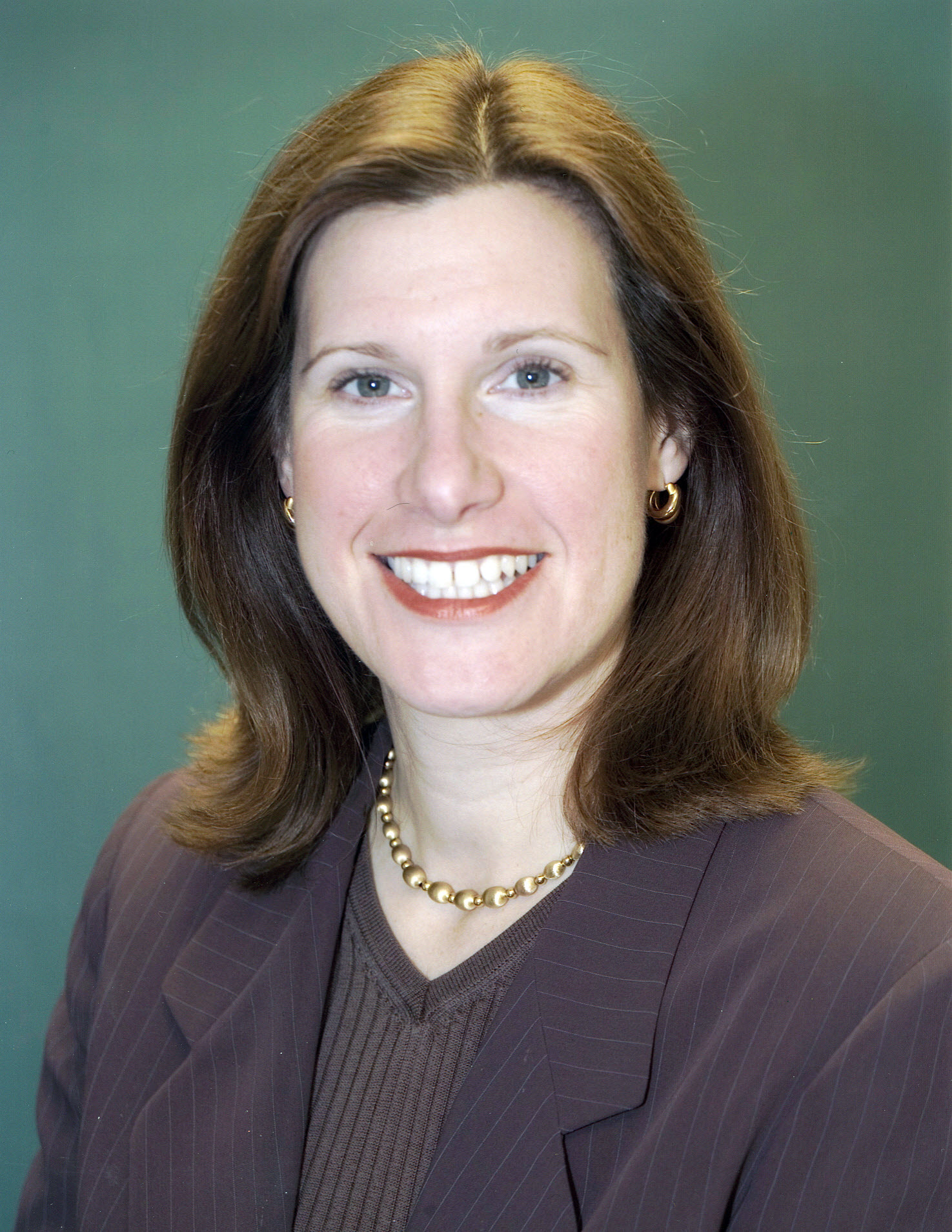

Nominee	Melissa Hart	Stevan Drobac
Party	Republican	Democratic
Popular vote	130,534	71,674
Percentage	64.55%	35.45%
- County results Hart: 50–60% 60–70% 70–80% Drobac: 60–70%
U.S. representative before election
Melissa Hart
Republican
Elected U.S. representative
Melissa Hart
Republican

=== Democratic primary ===
==== Candidates ====
===== Nominee =====
- Stevan Drobac

==== Eliminated in primary ====
- Mark A. Purcell

==== Primary results ====
Democratic primary results
Party	Candidate	Votes	%
Democratic	Stevan Drobac	30,413	54.26
Democratic	Mark A. Purcell	25,634	45.74
Total votes		56,047	100.00

=== Republican primary ===
==== Candidates ====
===== Nominee =====
- Melissa Hart, incumbent U.S. Representative

==== Primary results ====
Republican primary results
Party	Candidate	Votes	%
Republican	Melissa Hart (incumbent)	26,467	100.00
Total votes		26,467	100.00

=== General election ===
==== Predictions ====
Source	Ranking	As of
Sabato's Crystal Ball	Safe R	November 4, 2002
New York Times	Safe R	October 14, 2002

==== Results ====
General Election 2002: Pennsylvania's 4th congressional district
Party	Candidate	Votes	%
Republican	Melissa Hart (incumbent)	130,534	64.55
Democratic	Stevan Drobac	71,674	35.45
Total votes		202,208	100.00

== District 5 ==
2002 Pennsylvania's 5th congressional district election
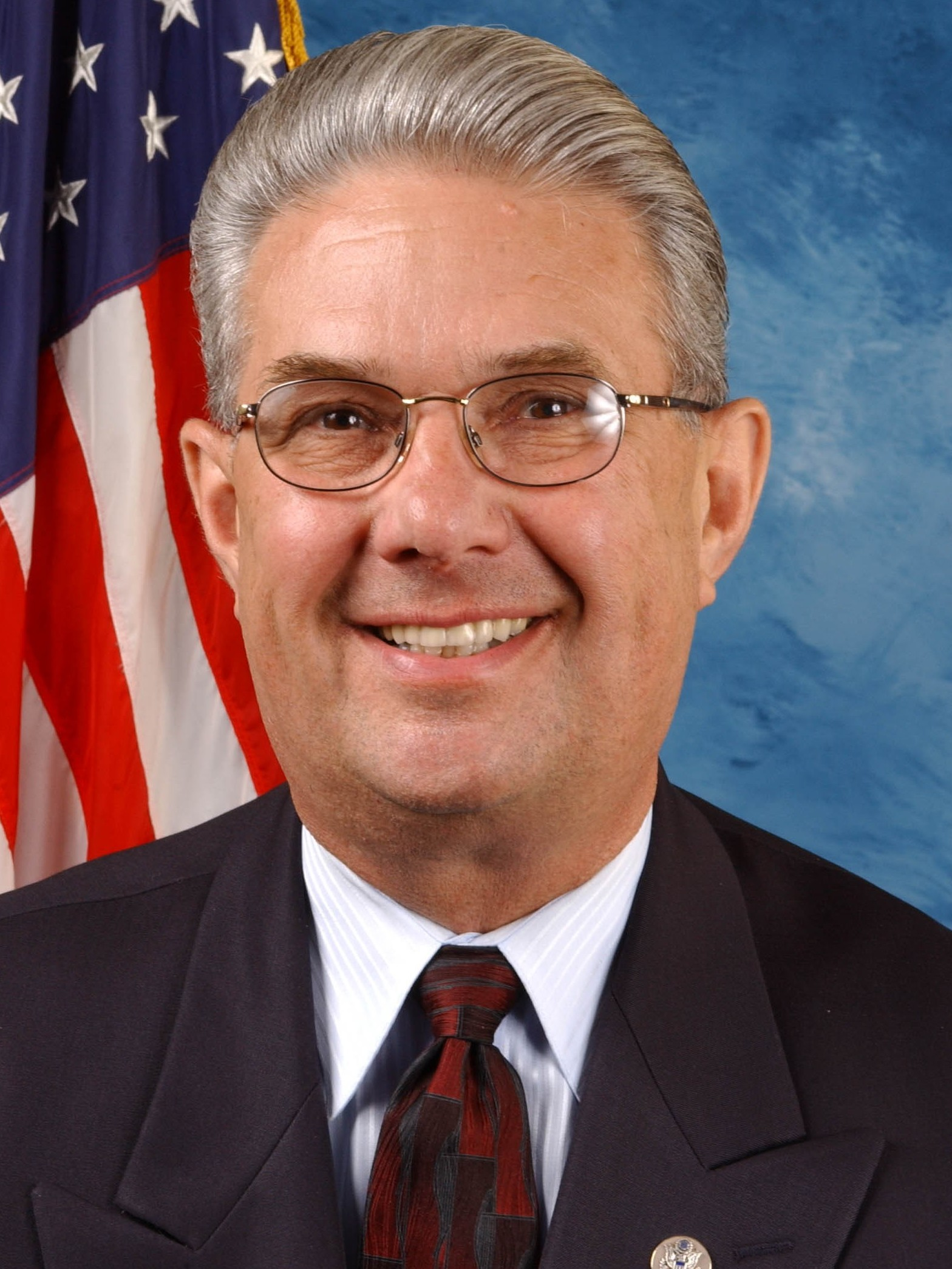

Nominee	John E. Peterson	Thomas Martin
Party	Republican	Libertarian
Popular vote	124,942	18,078
Percentage	87.36%	12.64%
- County results Peterson: 80–90% 90–100%
U.S. representative before election
John E. Peterson
Republican
Elected U.S. representative
John E. Peterson
Republican

=== Republican primary ===
==== Candidates ====
===== Nominee =====
- John E. Peterson, incumbent U.S. Representative

==== Primary results ====
Republican primary results
Party	Candidate	Votes	%
Republican	John E. Peterson (incumbent)	36,659	100.00
Total votes		36,659	100.00

=== General election ===
==== Predictions ====
Source	Ranking	As of
Sabato's Crystal Ball	Safe R	November 4, 2002
New York Times	Safe R	October 14, 2002

==== Results ====
General Election 2002: Pennsylvania's 5th congressional district
Party	Candidate	Votes	%
Republican	John E. Peterson (incumbent)	124,942	87.36
Libertarian	Thomas A. Martin	18,078	12.64
Total votes		143,020	100.00

== District 6 ==
2002 Pennsylvania's 6th congressional district election
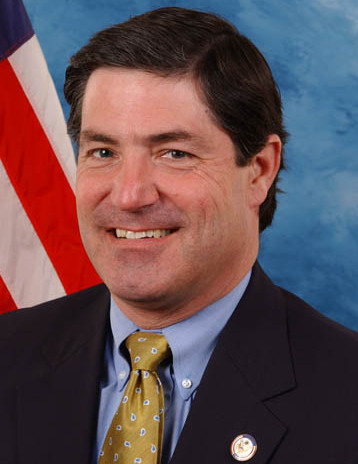

Nominee	Jim Gerlach	Dan Wofford
Party	Republican	Democratic
Popular vote	103,648	98,128
Percentage	51.37%	48.63%
- County results Gerlach: 50–60% Wofford: 50–60%
U.S. representative before election
Robert Borski
Democratic
Elected U.S. representative
Jim Gerlach
Republican

=== Democratic primary ===
==== Nominee ====
- Dan Wofford, lawyer and son of former U.S. Senator Harris Wofford

==== Eliminated in primary ====
- Frank Thomas

==== Primary results ====
Democratic primary results
Party	Candidate	Votes	%
Democratic	Dan Wofford	30,710	62.52
Democratic	Frank Thomas	18,412	37.48
Total votes		49,122	100.00

=== Republican primary ===
==== Nominee ====
- Jim Gerlach, member of the Pennsylvania State Senate

==== Primary results ====
Republican primary results
Party	Candidate	Votes	%
Republican	Jim Gerlach	27,821	100.00
Total votes		27,821	100.00

=== General election ===
==== Predictions ====
Source	Ranking	As of
Sabato's Crystal Ball	Safe R (flip)	November 4, 2002
New York Times	Lean R (flip)	October 14, 2002

==== Results ====
General Election 2002: Pennsylvania's 6th congressional district
Party	Candidate	Votes	%
Republican	Jim Gerlach	103,648	51.37
Democratic	Dan Wofford	98,128	48.63
Total votes		201,776	100.00

== District 7 ==
2002 Pennsylvania's 7th congressional district election
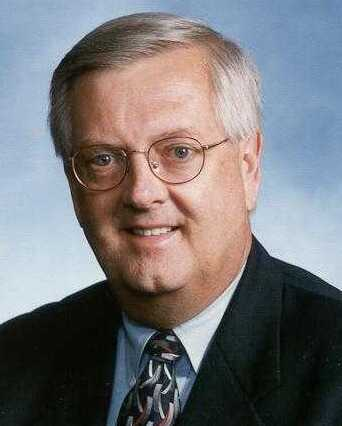

Nominee	Curt Weldon	Peter Lennon
Party	Republican	Democratic
Popular vote	146,296	75,055
Percentage	66.09%	33.91%
- County results Weldon: 60–70% 70–80%
U.S. representative before election
Curt Weldon
Republican
Elected U.S. representative
Curt Weldon
Republican

=== Democratic primary ===
==== Nominee ====
- Peter A. Lennon

==== Primary results ====
Democratic primary results
Party	Candidate	Votes	%
Democratic	Peter A. Lennon	27,503	100.00
Total votes		27,503	100.00

=== Republican primary ===
==== Nominee ====
- Curt Weldon, incumbent U.S. Representative

==== Primary results ====
Republican primary results
Party	Candidate	Votes	%
Republican	Curt Weldon (incumbent)	46,046	100.00
Total votes		46,046	100.00

=== General election ===
==== Predictions ====
Source	Ranking	As of
Sabato's Crystal Ball	Safe R	November 4, 2002
New York Times	Safe R	October 14, 2002

==== Results ====
General Election 2002: Pennsylvania's 7th congressional district
Party	Candidate	Votes	%
Republican	Curt Weldon (incumbent)	146,296	66.09
Democratic	Peter A. Lennon	75,055	33.91
Total votes		221,351	100.00

== District 8 ==
2002 Pennsylvania's 8th congressional district election
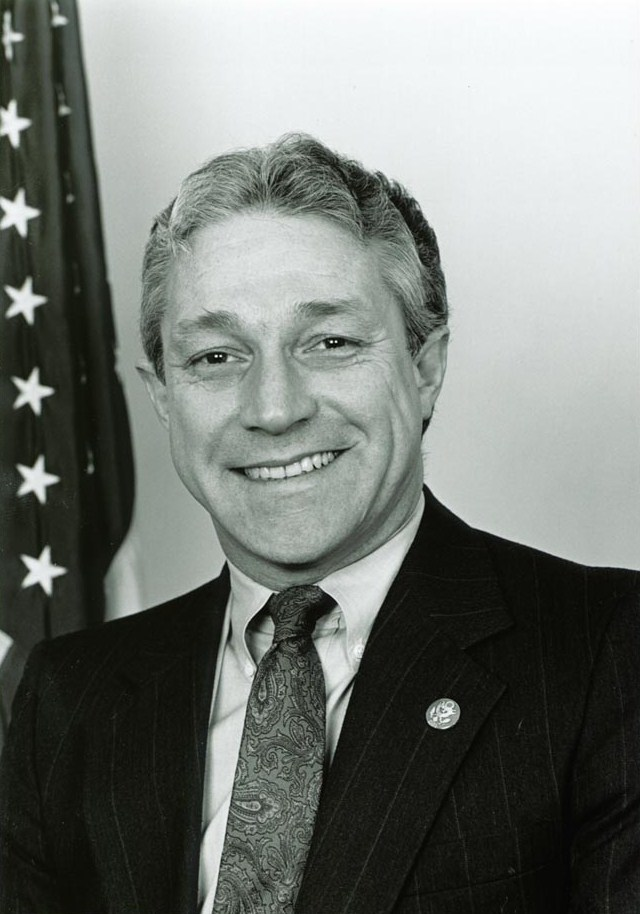

Nominee	Jim Greenwood	Timothy Reece
Party	Republican	Democratic
Popular vote	127,475	76,178
Percentage	62.59%	37.41%
- County results Greenwood: 50–60% 60–70%
U.S. representative before election
Jim Greenwood
Republican
Elected U.S. representative
Jim Greenwood
Republican

=== Republican primary ===
==== Nominee ====
- Jim Greenwood, incumbent U.S. Representative

==== Eliminated in primary ====
- Tom Lingenfelter

==== Primary results ====
Republican primary results
Party	Candidate	Votes	%
Republican	Jim Greenwood (incumbent)	31,327	69.14
Republican	Tom Lingenfelter	13,981	30.86
Total votes		45,308	100.00

=== General election ===
==== Predictions ====
Source	Ranking	As of
Sabato's Crystal Ball	Safe R	November 4, 2002
New York Times	Safe R	October 14, 2002

==== Results ====
General Election 2002: Pennsylvania's 8th congressional district
Party	Candidate	Votes	%
Republican	Jim Greenwood (incumbent)	127,475	62.59
Democratic	Timothy T. Reece	76,178	37.41
Total votes		203,653	100.00

== District 9 ==
2002 Pennsylvania's 9th congressional district election
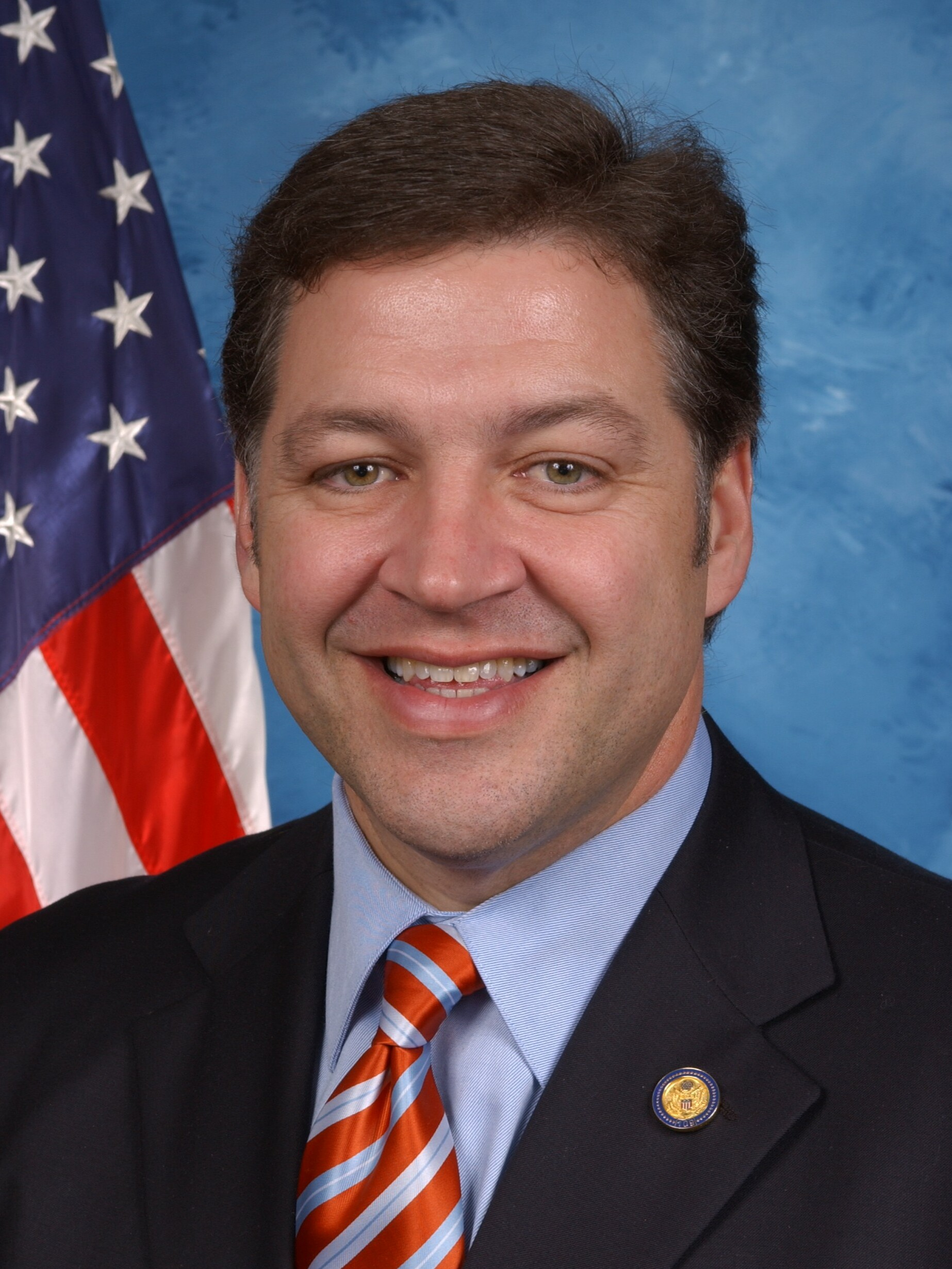

Nominee	Bill Shuster	John Henry
Party	Republican	Democratic
Popular vote	124,184	50,558
Percentage	71.07%	28.93%
- County results Shuster: 50–60% 60–70% 70–80% Henry: 50–60%
U.S. representative before election
Bill Shuster
Republican
Elected U.S. representative
Bill Shuster
Republican

=== Democratic primary ===
==== Nominee ====
- John R. Henry

==== Primary results ====
Democratic primary results
Party	Candidate	Votes	%
Democratic	John R. Henry	29,604	100.00
Total votes		29,604	100.00

=== Republican primary ===
==== Nominee ====
- Bill Shuster, incumbent U.S. Representative

==== Eliminated in primary ====
- David E. Bahr
- David S. Keller

==== Primary results ====
Republican primary results
Party	Candidate	Votes	%
Republican	Bill Shuster (incumbent)	33,538	74.01
Republican	David S. Keller	6,319	13.95
Republican	David E. Bahr	5,457	12.04
Total votes		45,314	100.00

=== General election ===
==== Predictions ====
Source	Ranking	As of
Sabato's Crystal Ball	Safe R	November 4, 2002
New York Times	Safe R	October 14, 2002

==== Results ====
General Election 2002: Pennsylvania's 9th congressional district
Party	Candidate	Votes	%
Republican	Bill Shuster (incumbent)	124,184	71.07
Democratic	John R. Henry	50,558	28.93
Total votes		174,742	100.00

== District 10 ==
2002 Pennsylvania's 10th congressional district election
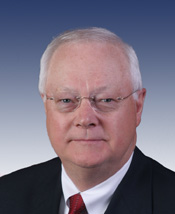

Nominee	Don Sherwood	Kurt Shotko
Party	Republican	Green
Popular vote	152,017	11,613
Percentage	92.90%	7.10%
- County results Sherwood: 80–90% 90–100%
U.S. representative before election
Don Sherwood
Republican
Elected U.S. representative
Don Sherwood
Republican

=== Republican primary ===
==== Nominee ====
- Don Sherwood, incumbent U.S. Representative

==== Primary results ====
Republican primary results
Party	Candidate	Votes	%
Republican	Don Sherwood (incumbent)	30,622	100.00
Total votes		30,622	100.00

=== General election ===
==== Predictions ====
Source	Ranking	As of
Sabato's Crystal Ball	Safe R	November 4, 2002
New York Times	Safe R	October 14, 2002

==== Results ====
General Election 2002: Pennsylvania's 10th congressional district
Party	Candidate	Votes	%
Republican	Don Sherwood (incumbent)	152,017	92.90
Green	Kurt J. Shotko	11,613	7.10
Total votes		163,630	100.00

== District 11 ==
2002 Pennsylvania's 11th congressional district election
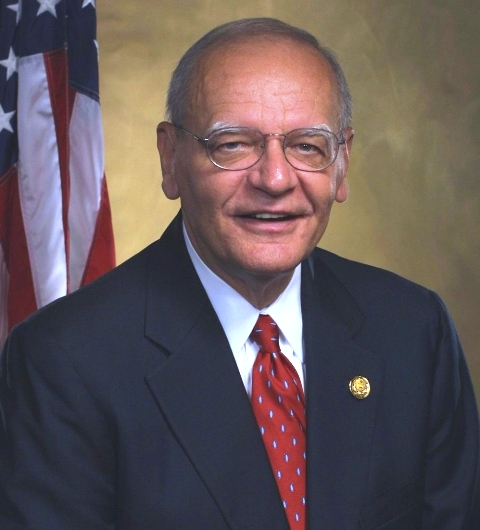

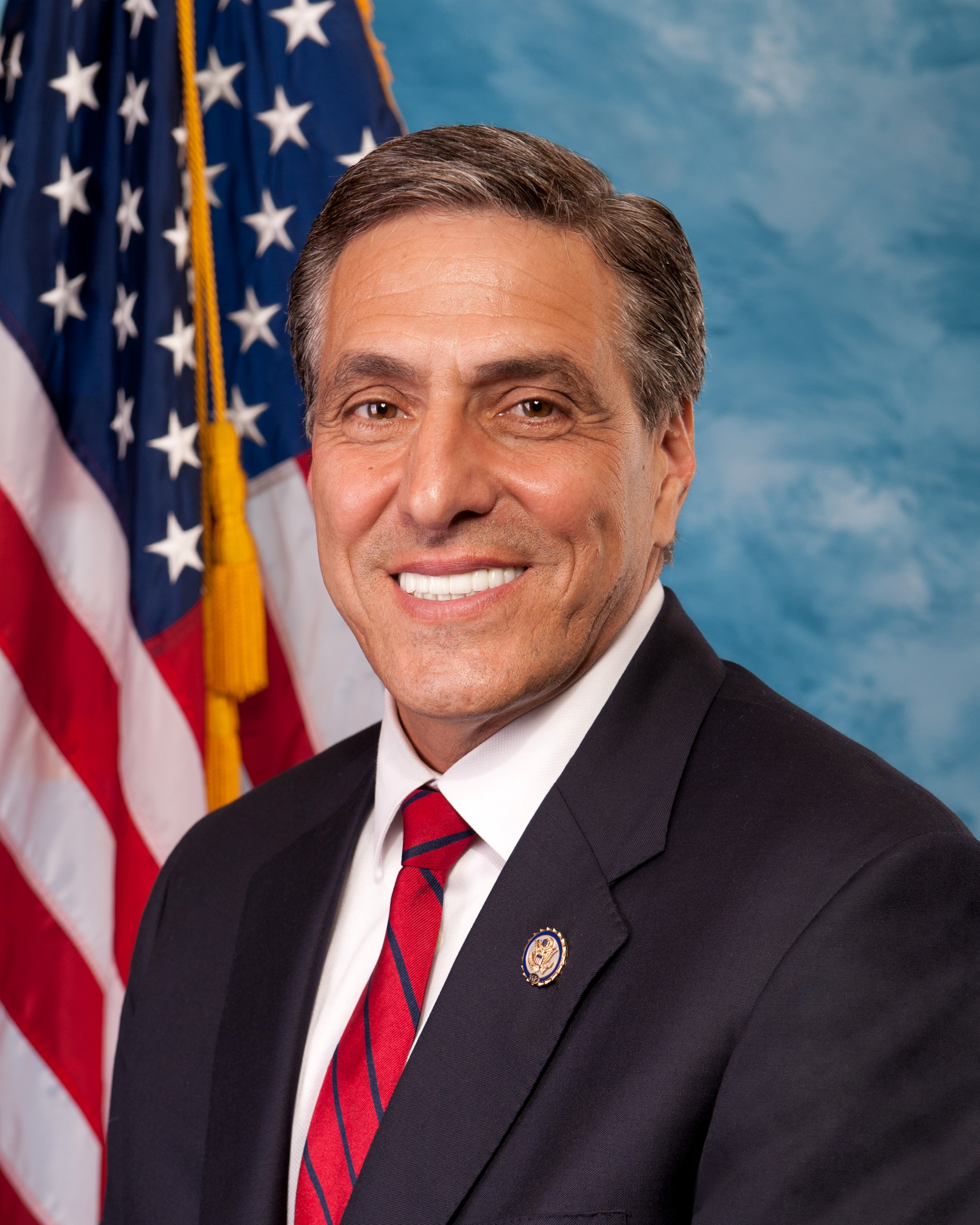
Nominee	Paul Kanjorski	Lou Barletta
Party	Democratic	Republican
Popular vote	93,758	71,543
Percentage	55.61%	42.43%
- County results Kanjorski: 40–50% 50–60% 60–70% Barletta: 50–60%
U.S. representative before election
Paul Kanjorski
Democratic
Elected U.S. representative
Paul Kanjorski
Democratic

=== Democratic primary ===
==== Nominee ====
- Paul Kanjorski, incumbent U.S. Representative

==== Primary results ====
Democratic primary results
Party	Candidate	Votes	%
Democratic	Paul Kanjorski (incumbent)	51,027	100.00
Total votes		51,027	100.00

=== Republican primary ===
==== Nominee ====
- Lou Barletta, mayor of Hazleton

==== Primary results ====
Republican primary results
Party	Candidate	Votes	%
Republican	Lou Barletta	15,311	100.00
Total votes		15,311	100.00

=== General election ===
==== Predictions ====
Source	Ranking	As of
Sabato's Crystal Ball	Safe D	November 4, 2002
New York Times	Safe D	October 14, 2002

==== Results ====
General Election 2002: Pennsylvania's 11th congressional district
Party	Candidate	Votes	%
Democratic	Paul Kanjorski (incumbent)	93,758	55.61%
Republican	Lou Barletta	71,543	42.43%
Reform	Thomas J. McLaughlin	3,304	1.96%
Total votes		168,605	100.00

== District 12 ==
2002 Pennsylvania's 12th congressional district election
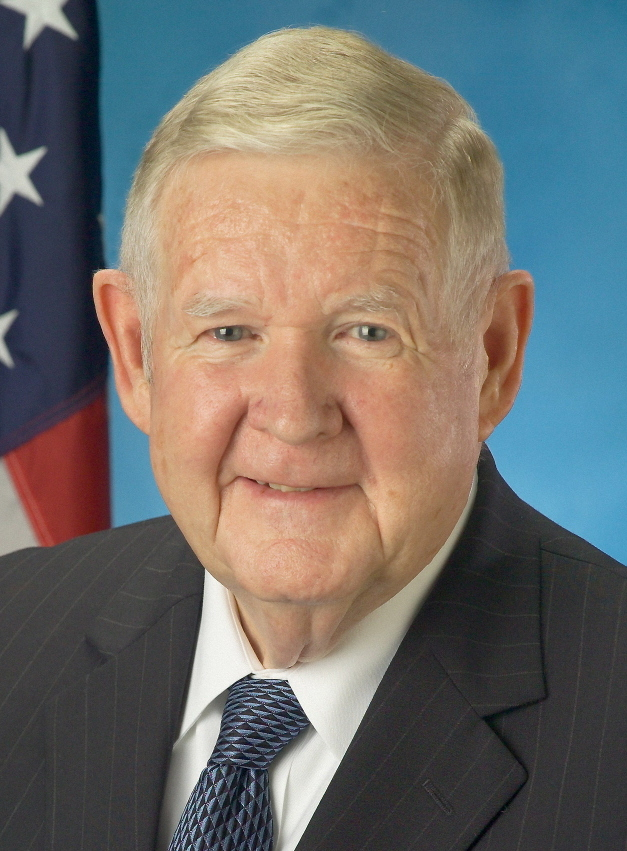

Nominee	John Murtha	Bill Choby
Party	Democratic	Republican
Popular vote	124,201	44,818
Percentage	73.48%	26.52%
- County results Murtha: 60–70% 70–80% 80–90%
U.S. representative before election
John Murtha
Democratic
Elected U.S. representative
John Murtha
Democratic

=== Democratic primary ===
==== Nominee ====
- John Murtha, incumbent U.S. Representative from the 12th district

==== Eliminated in primary ====
- Frank Mascara, incumbent U.S. Representative from the 20th district (Redistricted)

==== Primary results ====
Democratic primary results
Party	Candidate	Votes	%
Democratic	John Murtha (incumbent)	60,687	64.20
Democratic	Frank Mascara	33,837	35.80
Total votes		94,524	100.00

=== Republican primary ===
==== Nominee ====
- Bill Choby

==== Primary results ====
Republican primary results
Party	Candidate	Votes	%
Republican	Bill Choby	16,851	100.00
Total votes		16,851	100.00

=== General election ===
==== Predictions ====
Source	Ranking	As of
Sabato's Crystal Ball	Safe D	November 4, 2002
New York Times	Safe D	October 14, 2002

==== Results ====
General Election 2002: Pennsylvania's 12th congressional district
Party	Candidate	Votes	%
Democratic	John Murtha (incumbent)	124,201	73.48
Republican	Bill Choby	44,818	26.52
Total votes		169,019	100.00

== District 13 ==
2002 Pennsylvania's 13th congressional district election
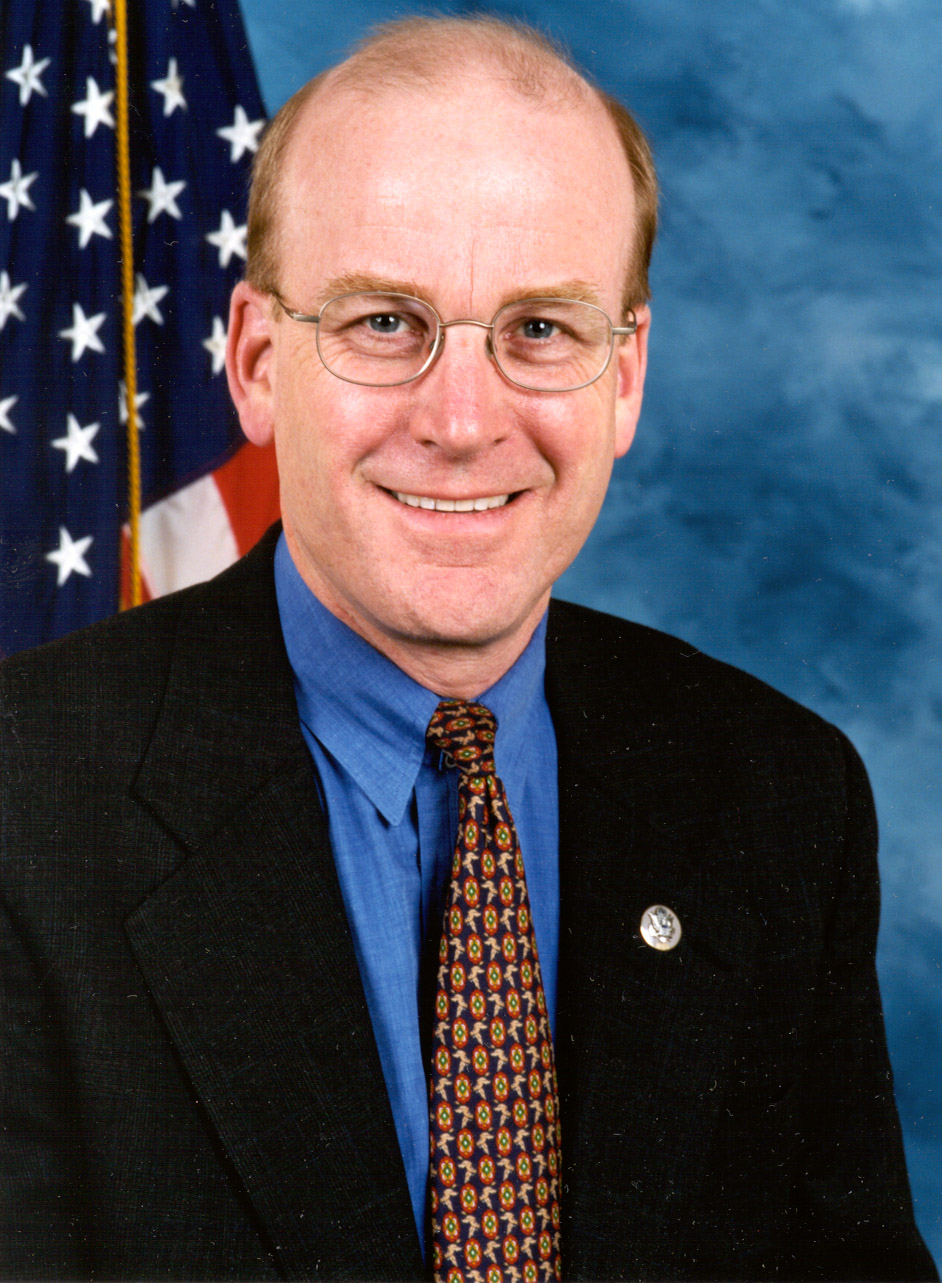

Nominee	Joe Hoeffel	Melissa Brown
Party	Democratic	Republican
Popular vote	107,945	100,295
Percentage	50.95%	47.34%
- County results Hoeffel: 50–60%
U.S. representative before election
Joe Hoeffel
Democratic
Elected U.S. representative
Joe Hoeffel
Democratic

=== Democratic primary ===
==== Nominee ====
- Joe Hoeffel, incumbent U.S. Representative

==== Primary results ====
Democratic primary results
Party	Candidate	Votes	%
Democratic	Joe Hoeffel	62,793	100.00
Total votes		62,793	100.00

=== Republican primary ===
==== Nominee ====
- Melissa Brown, ophthalmologist and previous candidate for Congress

==== Eliminated in primary ====
- Al Taubenberger, former Philadelphia City Council staff member and president of the Greater Northeast Philadelphia Chamber of Commerce

==== Primary results ====
Republican primary results
Party	Candidate	Votes	%
Republican	Melissa Brown	19,917	55.17
Republican	Al Taubenberger	16,184	44.83
Total votes		36,101	100.00

=== General election ===
==== Predictions ====
Source	Ranking	As of
Sabato's Crystal Ball	Safe D	November 4, 2002
New York Times	Safe D	October 14, 2002

==== Results ====
General Election 2002: Pennsylvania's 13th congressional district
Party	Candidate	Votes	%
Democratic	Joe Hoeffel	107,945	50.95
Republican	Melissa Brown	100,295	47.34
Constitution	John P. McDermott	3,627	1.71
Total votes		211,867	100.00

== District 14 ==
2002 Pennsylvania's 14th congressional district election
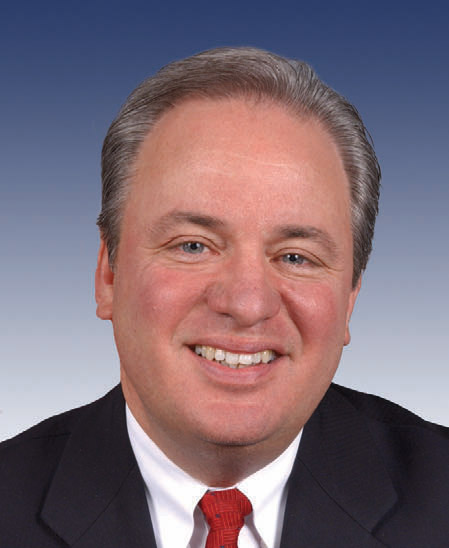
Nominee	Mike Doyle
Party	Democratic
Popular vote	123,323
Percentage	100.00%
U.S. representative before election
Mike Doyle
Democratic
Elected U.S. representative
Mike Doyle
Democratic

=== Democratic primary ===
==== Nominee ====
- Mike Doyle, incumbent U.S. Representative

==== Primary results ====
Democratic primary results
Party	Candidate	Votes	%
Democratic	Mike Doyle (incumbent)	72,886	100.00
Total votes		72,886	100.00

=== General election ===
==== Predictions ====
Source	Ranking	As of
Sabato's Crystal Ball	Safe D	November 4, 2002
New York Times	Safe D	October 14, 2002

==== Results ====
General Election 2002: Pennsylvania's 14th congressional district
Party	Candidate	Votes	%
Democratic	Mike Doyle (incumbent)	123,323	100.00
Total votes		123,323	100.00

== District 15 ==
2002 Pennsylvania's 15th congressional district election
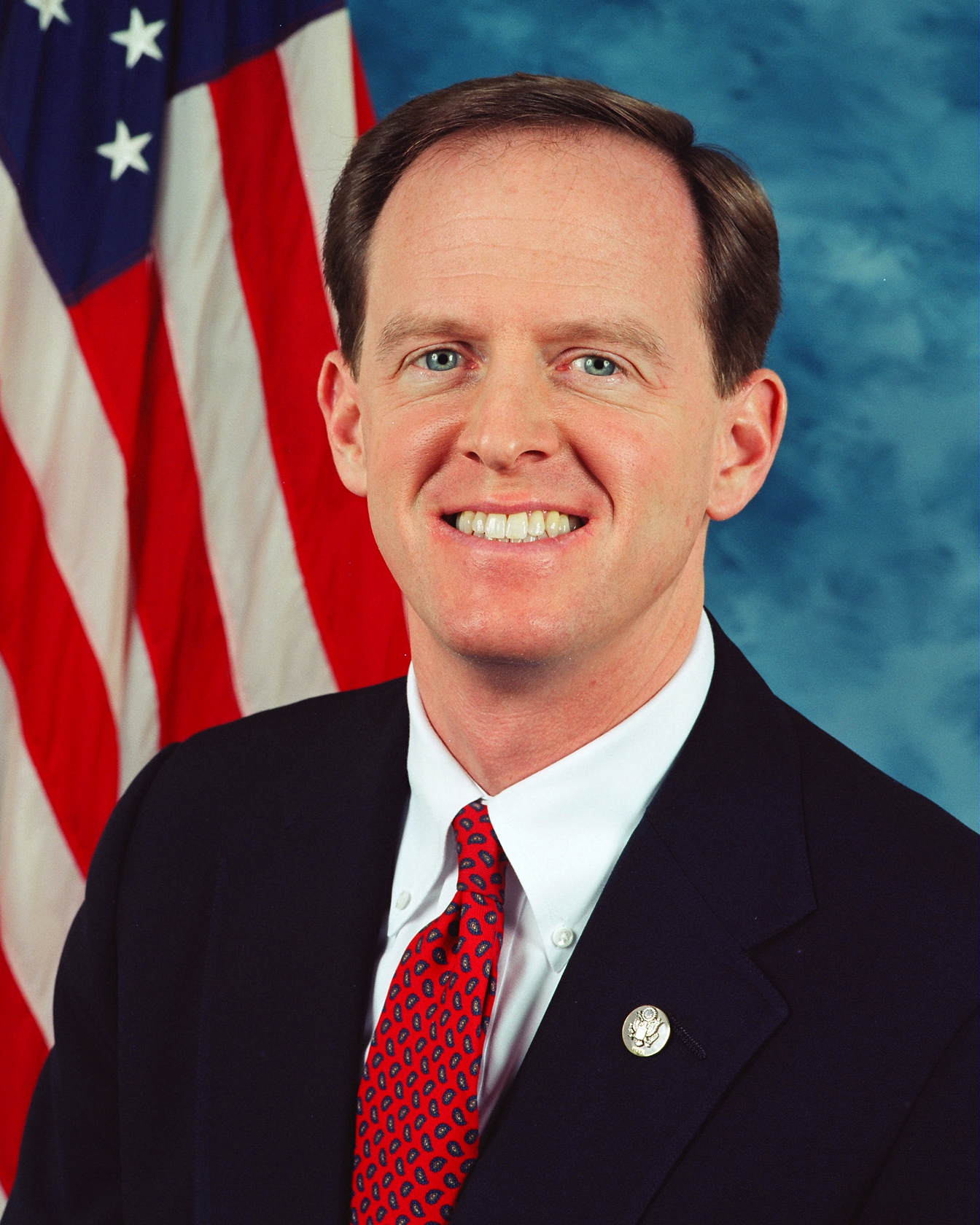

Nominee	Pat Toomey	Edward O'Brien
Party	Republican	Democratic
Popular vote	98,493	73,212
Percentage	57.36%	42.64%
- County results Toomey: 50–60% 60–70%
U.S. representative before election
Pat Toomey
Republican
Elected U.S. representative
Pat Toomey
Republican

=== Democratic primary ===
==== Nominee ====
- Edward J. O'Brien

==== Primary results ====
Democratic primary results
Party	Candidate	Votes	%
Democratic	Edward J. O'Brien	32,671	100.00
Total votes		32,671	100.00

=== Republican primary ===
==== Nominee ====
- Pat Toomey, incumbent U.S. Representative

==== Primary results ====
Republican primary results
Party	Candidate	Votes	%
Republican	Pat Toomey (incumbent)	23,602	100.00
Total votes		23,602	100.00

=== General election ===
==== Predictions ====
Source	Ranking	As of
Sabato's Crystal Ball	Lean R	November 4, 2002
New York Times	Safe R	October 14, 2002

==== Results ====
General Election 2002: Pennsylvania's 15th congressional district
Party	Candidate	Votes	%
Republican	Pat Toomey (incumbent)	98,493	57.36
Democratic	Edward J. O'Brien	73,212	42.64
Total votes		171,705	100.00

== District 16 ==
2002 Pennsylvania's 16th congressional district election
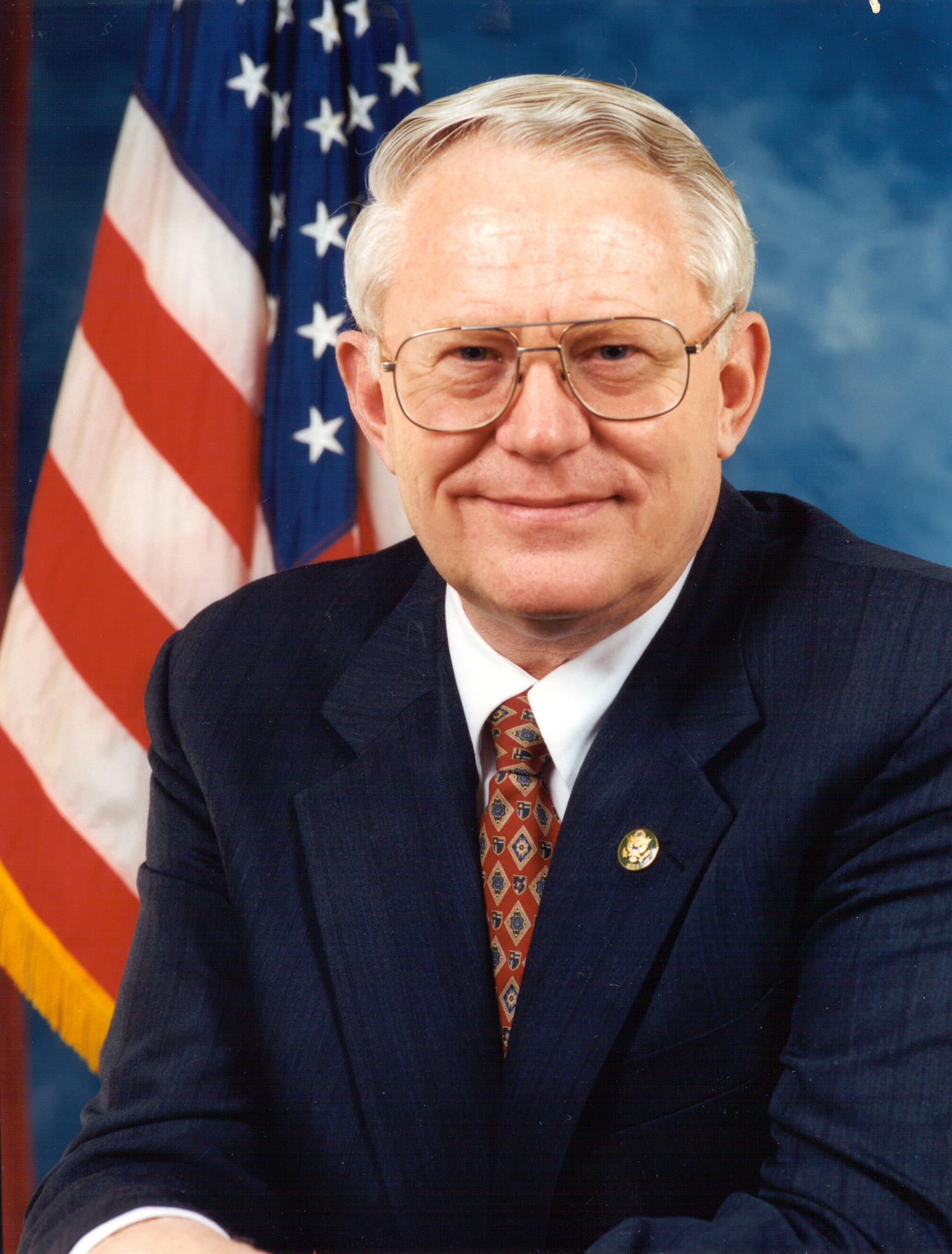

Nominee	Joe Pitts	Will Todd	Kenneth Brenneman
Party	Republican	Green	Constitution
Popular vote	119,046	8,720	6,766
Percentage	88.49%	6.48%	5.03%
- County results Pitts: 70–80% 80–90% 90–100%
U.S. representative before election
Joe Pitts
Republican
Elected U.S. representative
Joe Pitts
Republican

=== Republican primary ===
==== Nominee ====
- Joe Pitts, incumbent U.S. Representative

==== Primary results ====
Republican primary results
Party	Candidate	Votes	%
Republican	Joe Pitts (incumbent)	35,759	100.00
Total votes		35,759	100.00

=== General election ===
==== Predictions ====
Source	Ranking	As of
Sabato's Crystal Ball	Safe R	November 4, 2002
New York Times	Safe R	October 14, 2002

==== Results ====
General Election 2002: Pennsylvania's 16th congressional district
Party	Candidate	Votes	%
Republican	Joe Pitts (incumbent)	119,046	88.49
Green	Will Todd	8,720	6.48
Constitution	Kenneth Brenneman	6,766	5.03
Total votes		134,532	100.00

== District 17 ==
2002 Pennsylvania's 17th congressional district election
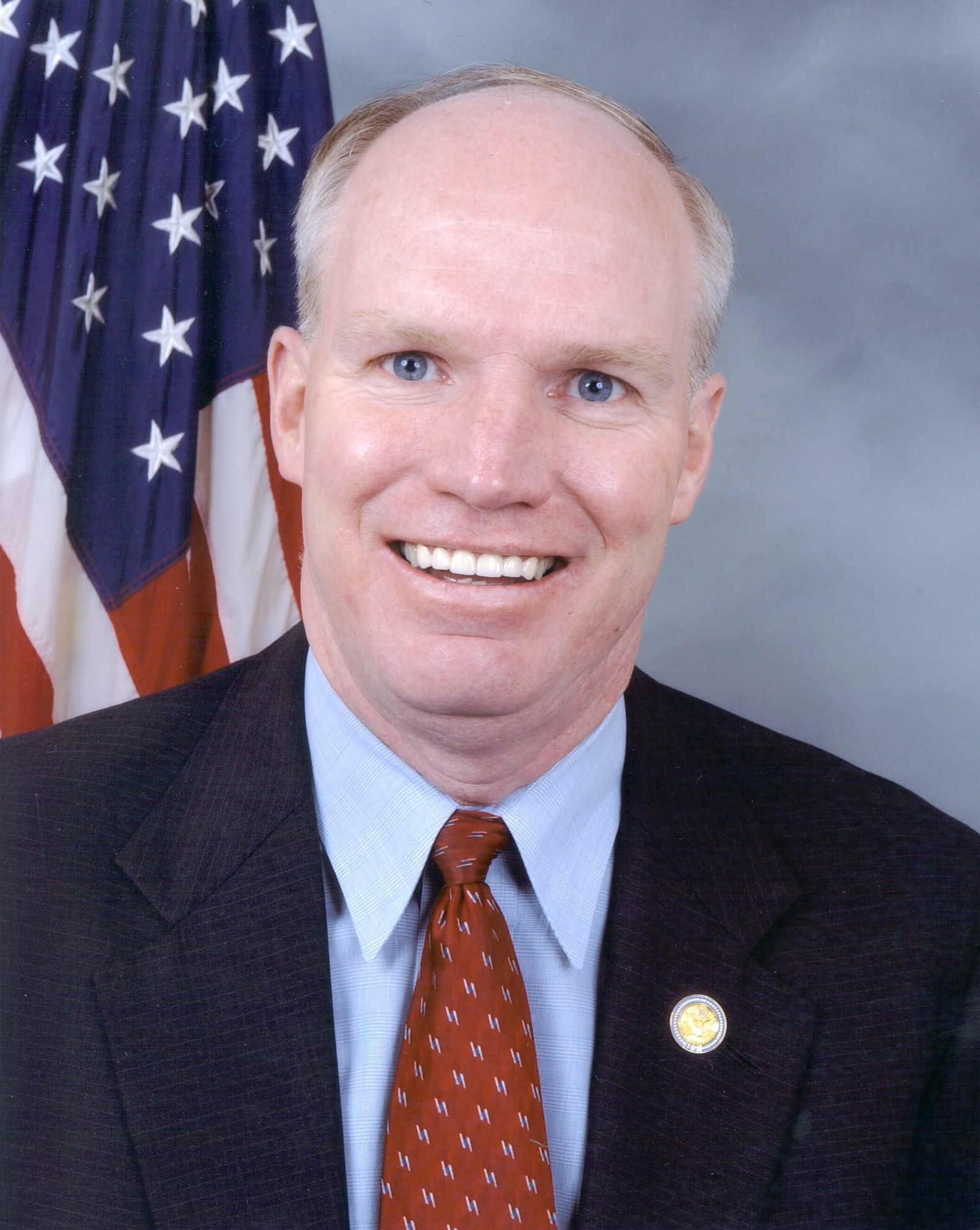

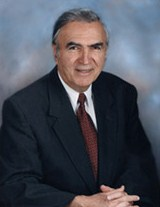
Nominee	Tim Holden	George Gekas
Party	Democratic	Republican
Popular vote	103,483	97,802
Percentage	51.41%	48.59%
- County results Holden: 50–60% 70–80% Gekas: 50–60% 60–70%
U.S. representative before election
Tim Holden
Democratic
Elected U.S. representative
Tim Holden
Democratic

=== Democratic primary ===
==== Nominee ====
- Tim Holden, incumbent U.S. Representative

==== Primary results ====
Democratic primary results
Party	Candidate	Votes	%
Democratic	Tim Holden (incumbent)	35,940	100.00
Total votes		35,940	100.00

=== Republican primary ===
==== Nominee ====
- George Gekas, incumbent U.S. Representative from the 17th district (Redistricted)

==== Primary results ====
Republican primary results
Party	Candidate	Votes	%
Republican	George Gekas	39,734	100.00
Total votes		39,734	100.00

=== General election ===
==== Predictions ====
Source	Ranking	As of
Sabato's Crystal Ball	Lean D (flip)	November 4, 2002
New York Times	Tossup	October 14, 2002

==== Results ====
General Election 2002: Pennsylvania's 17th congressional district
Party	Candidate	Votes	%
Democratic	Tim Holden (incumbent)	103,483	51.41
Republican	George Gekas	97,802	48.59
Total votes		201,285	100.00

== District 18 ==
2002 Pennsylvania's 18th congressional district election
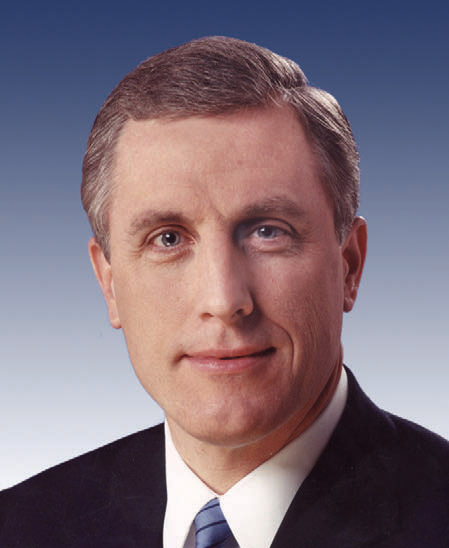

Nominee	Tim Murphy	Jack Machek
Party	Republican	Democratic
Popular vote	119,885	79,451
Percentage	60.14%	39.86%
- County results Murphy: 50–60% 60–70%
U.S. representative before election
Frank Mascara
Democratic
Elected U.S. representative
Tim Murphy
Republican

=== Democratic primary ===
==== Nominee ====
- Jack Machek

==== Eliminated in primary ====
- Bob Domske
- Larry Maggi

==== Primary results ====
Democratic primary results
Party	Candidate	Votes	%
Democratic	Jack Machek	28,565	47.05
Democratic	Larry Maggi	23,392	38.53
Democratic	Bob Domske	8,756	14.42
Total votes		60,713	100.00

=== Republican primary ===
==== Nominee ====
- Tim Murphy, member of the Pennsylvania State Senate

==== Primary results ====
Republican primary results
Party	Candidate	Votes	%
Republican	Tim Murphy	24,324	100.00
Total votes		24,324	100.00

=== General election ===
==== Predictions ====
Source	Ranking	As of
Sabato's Crystal Ball	Safe R (flip)	November 4, 2002
New York Times	Safe R (flip)	October 14, 2002

==== Results ====
General Election 2002: Pennsylvania's 18th congressional district
Party	Candidate	Votes	%
Republican	Tim Murphy	119,885	60.14
Democratic	Jack Machek	79,451	39.86
Total votes		199,336	100.00

== District 19 ==
2002 Pennsylvania's 19th congressional district election
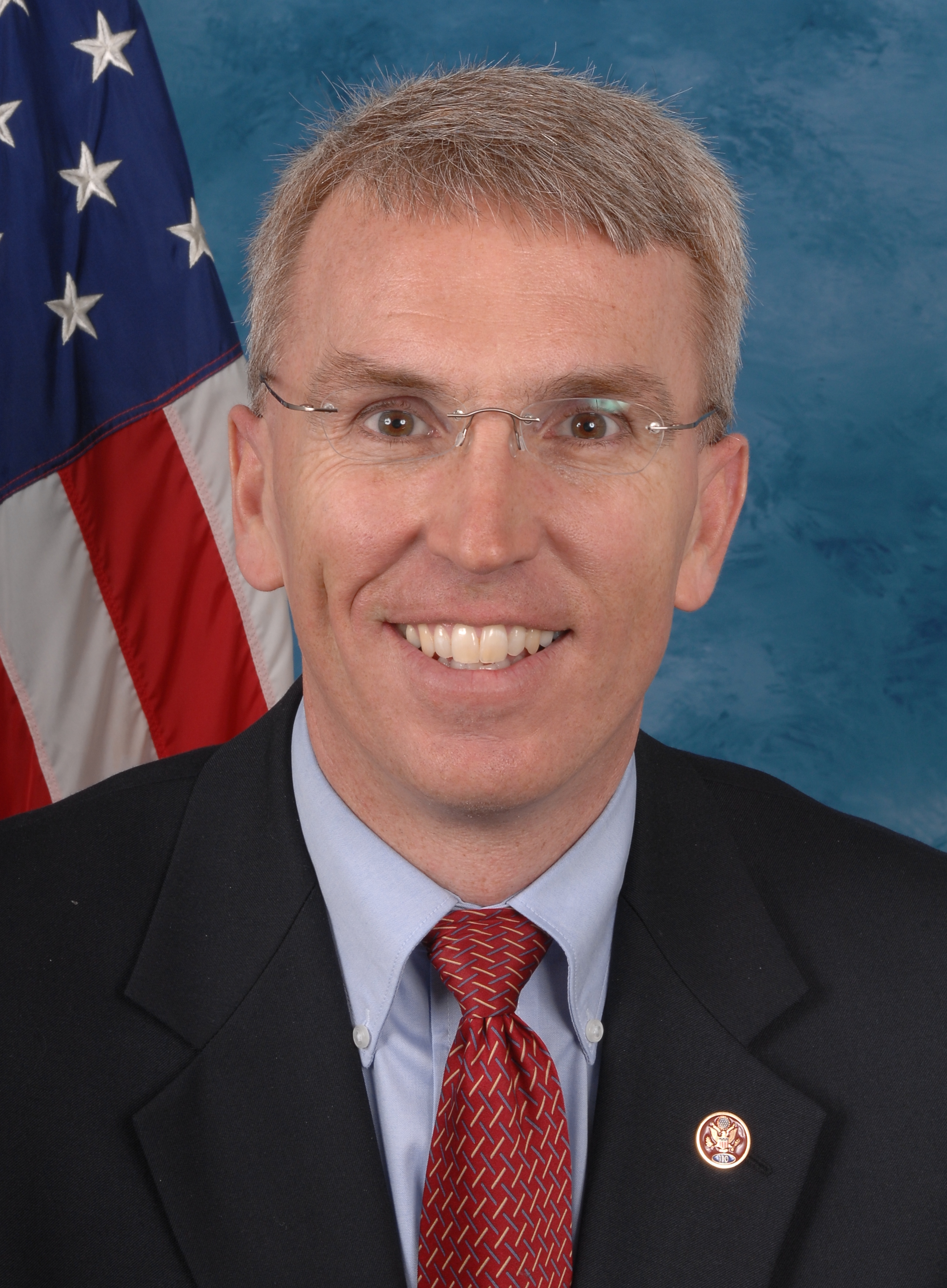

Nominee	Todd Platts	Ben Price
Party	Republican	Green
Popular vote	143,097	7,900
Percentage	91.14%	5.03%
- County results Platts: 80–90% 90–100%
U.S. representative before election
Todd Platts
Republican
Elected U.S. representative
Todd Platts
Republican

=== Republican primary ===
==== Nominee ====
- Todd Platts, incumbent U.S. Representative

==== Eliminated in primary ====
- Tom Glennon
- Mike Johnson
- Lester B. Searer

==== Primary results ====
Republican primary results
Party	Candidate	Votes	%
Republican	Todd Platts (incumbent)	34,026	76.59
Republican	Tom Glennon	7,150	16.09
Republican	Lester B. Searer	1,921	4.32
Republican	Mike Johnson	1,332	3.00
Total votes		44,429	100.00

=== General election ===
==== Predictions ====
Source	Ranking	As of
Sabato's Crystal Ball	Safe R	November 4, 2002
New York Times	Safe R	October 14, 2002

==== Results ====
General Election 2002: Pennsylvania's 19th congressional district
Party	Candidate	Votes	%
Republican	Todd Platts (incumbent)	143,097	91.14
Green	Ben Price	7,900	5.03
Libertarian	Michael Paoletta	6,008	3.83
Total votes		157,005	100.00

== See also ==
- Pennsylvania's congressional delegations
- 108th United States Congress
