= Pennsylvania House of Representatives, District 155 =

American legislative district

Pennsylvania's 155th State House of Representatives district
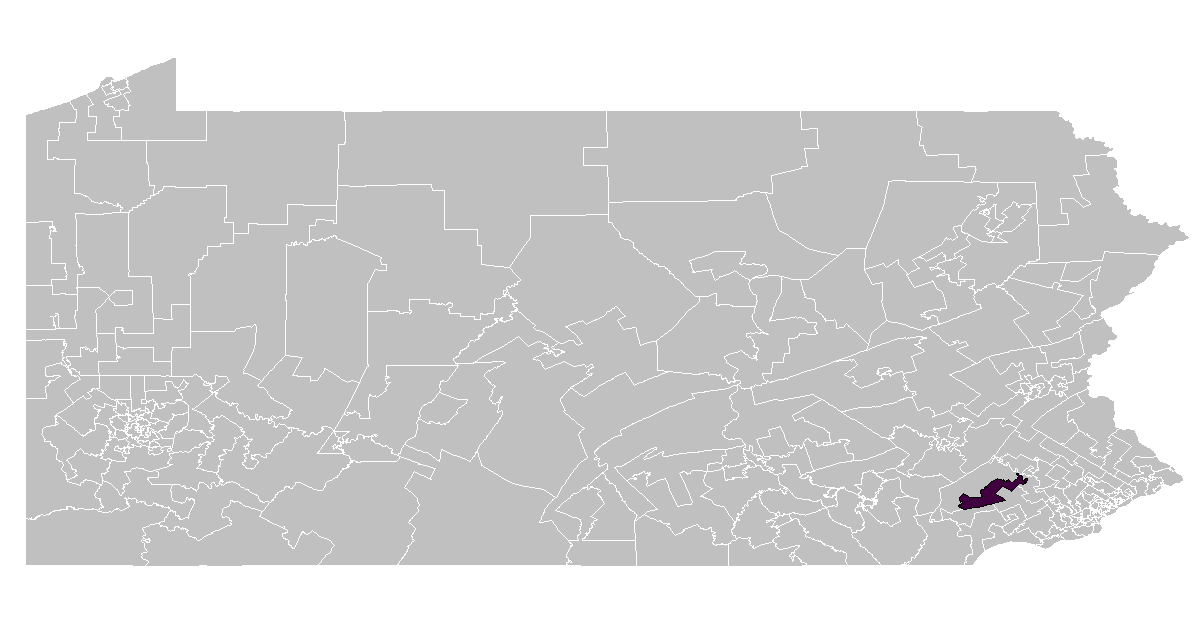
Representative
Danielle Friel Otten; D–Uwchlan Township

The 155th Pennsylvania House of Representatives District is located in Chester County and includes the following areas:

- Downingtown
- Caln Township (PART, District 04)
- East Brandywine Township
- West Brandywine Township
- Upper Uwchlan Township
- Uwchlan Township
- Wallace Township

== Representatives ==
Representative	Party	Years	District home	Note
Prior to 1969, seats were apportioned by county.
Timothy Slack	Republican	1969 – 1970		
Samuel Morris	Democrat	1971 – 1978		
E. Raymond Lynch	Republican	1979 – 1980		
Samuel Morris	Democrat	1981 – 1990		
Jim Gerlach	Republican	1991 – 1994	West Pikeland Township	Elected to the Pennsylvania State Senate
Curt Schroder	Republican	1995 – 2012	Downingtown	Resigned May 6, 2012
Becky Corbin	Republican	2013 – 2018	East Brandywine Township	Unsuccessful candidate for re-election
Danielle Friel Otten	Democrat	2019–present	Uwchlan Township	
