= Danielle Friel Otten =

American politician

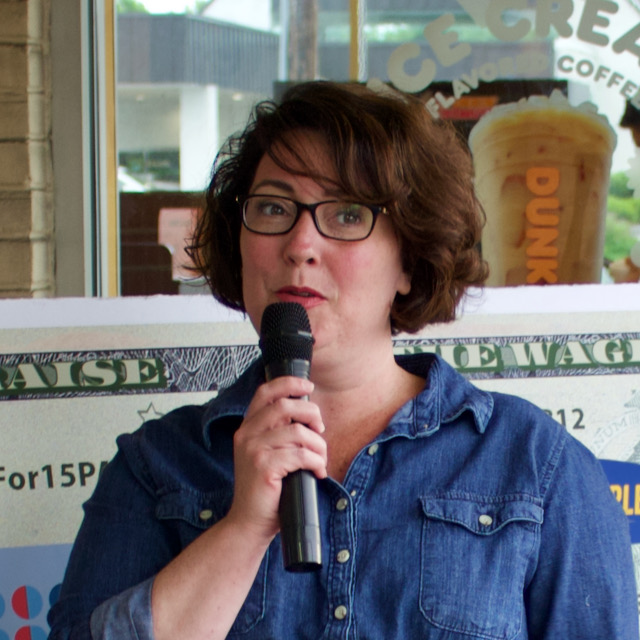

Member of the Pennsylvania House of Representatives from the 155th district
- Incumbent
- Assumed office January 1, 2019
- Preceded by: Becky Corbin

Personal details
- Born: July 25, 1977 (age 49)
- Party: Democratic
- Education: West Chester University
- Occupation: Marketing consultant

Danielle Friel Otten is a member of the Pennsylvania House of Representatives, representing the 155th district. She is a member of the Democratic Party.

== Political career ==
Running in opposition to the Mariner East 2 Pipeline, Otten defeated East Pikeland Supervisor Ron Graham in the Democratic primary for the 155th district by garnering 82.1% of the vote. Otten defeated incumbent representative Becky Corbin in the 2018 general election, garnering 55% of the vote. Otten faced controversy several months after taking office. In a Twitter post she made a comparison of union pipeline workers to Nazi's.

In 2020, Otten won reelection. She defeated a primary challenger, Rose Danese, winning 74% of the vote in the Democratic primary. She went on to win the general election against challenger Michael Taylor, garnering 55% of the vote.

Otten currently sits on the Aging & Older Adult Services, Environmental Resources & Energy, and Human Services committees.
