= Curt Schroder =

American politician

Member of the Pennsylvania House of Representatives from the 155th district
- In office January 3, 1995 – May 6, 2012
- Preceded by: Jim Gerlach
- Succeeded by: Becky Corbin

Personal details
- Born: 1961 (age 64–65) Coatesville, Pennsylvania, United States
- Party: Republican
- Education: Indiana University of Pennsylvania; Widener University School of Law
- Occupation: Attorney
- Website: Pennsylvania State Representative Curt Schroder

Ralph Curtis Schroder is former a member of the Pennsylvania House of Representatives. He represented the 155th district for nine terms. Schroder resigned on May 6, 2012. Schroder was the Republican Chairman of the House Gaming Oversight Committee, and was also on the House Insurance Committee.

== Career ==
Prior to his time in the House, Schroder was Prothonotary for Chester County from 1992 to 1994.

He began his involvement in public service in 1984, when he worked on constituent issues in the district office of Congressman Richard Schultze. Schroder also served as Campaign Coordinator for Schulze for Congress in 1984.

Following his time with Congressman Schulze, Schroder worked for Nationwide Insurance as an associate agent before beginning his legal career with the firm of German, Gallagher and Murtagh from 1987 through 1991.

Following Jim Gerlach's July 14, 2009 announcement that he intended to vacate his Congressional seat to run for Governor of Pennsylvania, Schroder announced his candidacy for Congress. Schroder was considered the frontrunner for the GOP nomination, until Gerlach ended his candidacy for governor and announced he would be running for his Congressional seat once again. Gerlach's announcement prompted Schroder to end his bid for Congress.

== Personal ==
Schroder is member of the Downingtown Lions Club. He also serves on the Board of Directors of Brandywine Hospital, the Transportation Management Association of Chester County (TMACC), The Downingtown Senior Center, and the Brandywine YMCA.

Schroder is a 1979 graduate of Downingtown High School. He holds a bachelor's degree in political science from Indiana University of Pennsylvania. He earned his Juris Doctor from Widener University School of Law in 1989.

He and his wife Deanna reside in Downingtown with their two children, Mark and Kristen.

Pennsylvania House of Representatives
Preceded by Jim Gerlach	Member of the Pennsylvania House of Representatives for the 155th District; 1995–2012	Succeeded by Becky Corbin
