= Timothy Slack =

American politician

Member of the Pennsylvania House of Representatives from the 155th district
- In office January 7, 1969 – November 30, 1970
- Preceded by: District Created
- Succeeded by: Samuel Morris

Member of the Pennsylvania House of Representatives from the Chester County district
- In office January 3, 1961 – November 30, 1968

Personal details
- Born: April 11, 1913 Coatesville, Pennsylvania
- Died: June 1976 (aged 63) Thorndale, Pennsylvania
- Party: Republican

Charles Timothy Slack (April 11, 1913 – June 1976) was a Republican member of the Pennsylvania House of Representatives.
