= Samuel Morris (Pennsylvania politician) =

American politician

Samuel Wheeler Morris

Member of the Pennsylvania House of Representatives from the 155th district
- In office January 5, 1971 – November 30, 1978
- Preceded by: Timothy Slack
- Succeeded by: Raymond Lynch
- In office January 6, 1981 – November 30, 1990
- Preceded by: Raymond Lynch
- Succeeded by: Jim Gerlach

Personal details
- Born: August 21, 1918 Atlantic City, New Jersey
- Died: December 18, 1995 (aged 77) Pottstown, Pennsylvania
- Party: Democratic
- Spouse: Eleanor Morris
- Education: Harvard College (BS); University of Pennsylvania Law School (JD)
- Occupation: Attorney, Politician

Samuel Wheeler Morris (August 21, 1918 – December 18, 1995) was a former Democratic member of the Pennsylvania House of Representatives.

== Career ==
Samuel Morris served in World War II and saw action in northern France. He was elected to the Pennsylvania State House as a Democrat in a heavily Republican district and always faced well-funded opponents. He was first elected in 1970, and after losing in 1978, was re-elected every election until 1990. His major issues of concern were preservation of the environment, education, and transportation. He was well-respected by both parties for his knowledge and dedication to the people of his district. Morris founded the French and Pickering Creek Trust in 1967. He lost his bid for re-election in 1990 to Jim Gerlach.
