= Jim Gerlach =

American politician (born 1955)

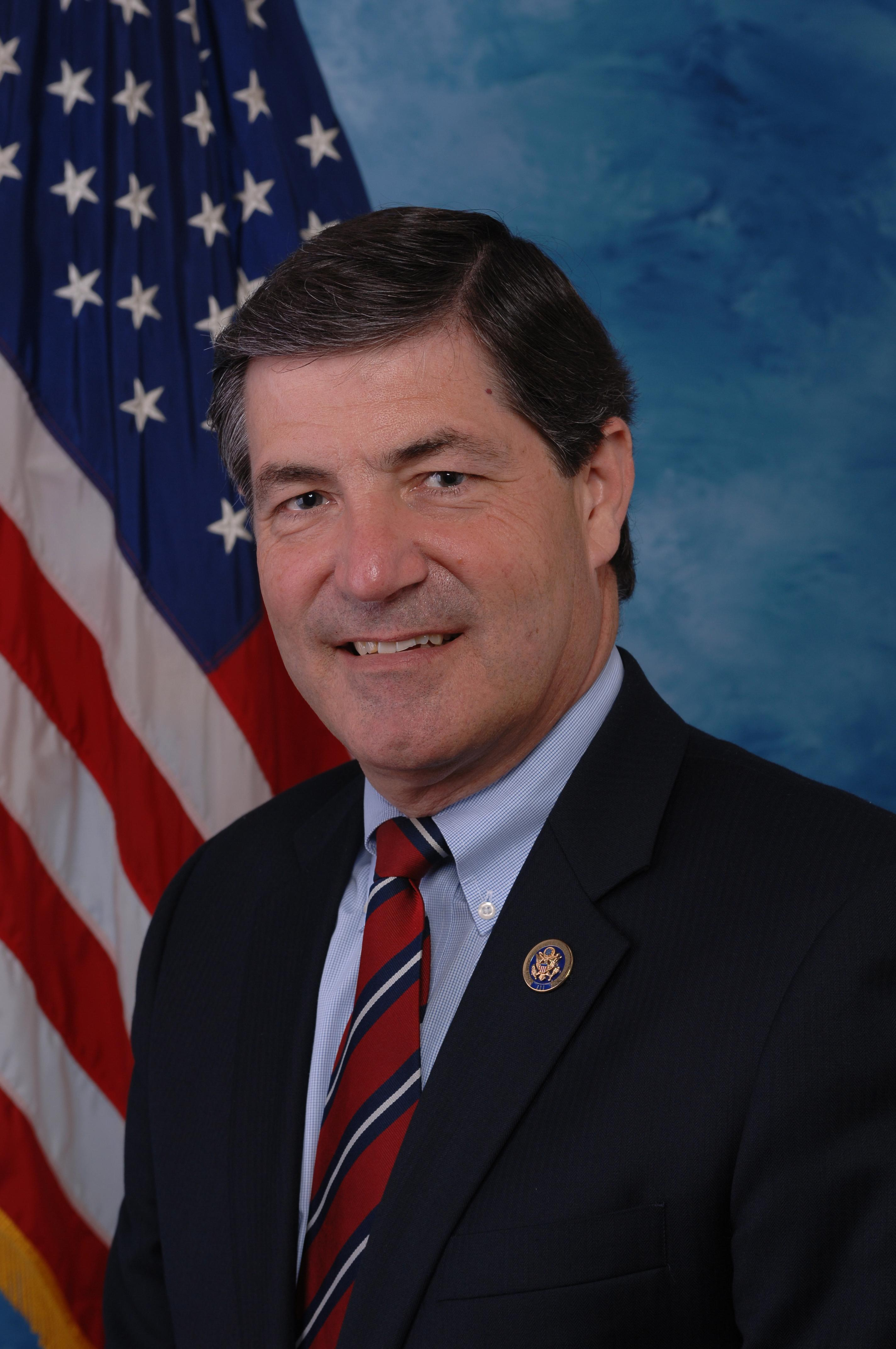

Member of the U.S. House of Representatives from Pennsylvania's 6th district
- In office January 3, 2003 – January 3, 2015
- Preceded by: Tim Holden
- Succeeded by: Ryan Costello

Member of the Pennsylvania Senate from the 44th district
- In office January 3, 1995 – January 3, 2003
- Preceded by: Frank Pecora
- Succeeded by: John Rafferty

Member of the Pennsylvania House of Representatives from the 155th district
- In office January 1, 1991 – January 3, 1995
- Preceded by: Samuel Morris
- Succeeded by: Curt Schroder

Personal details
- Born: James William Gerlach; February 25, 1955 (age 71) Ellwood City, Pennsylvania, U.S.
- Party: Republican
- Spouse: Karen Gerlach
- Children: 3
- Education: Dickinson College (BA, JD)

James William Gerlach (born February 25, 1955) is the former U.S. representative for Pennsylvania's 6th congressional district, serving from 2003 to 2015. He is a member of the Republican Party. Gerlach retired from Congress after completing his sixth term.

== Early life, education and career ==
Gerlach was born in Ellwood City, Pennsylvania, to Helen Lorraine (née Fitzgerald) and Jack Allen Gerlach. His father was killed by a drunk driver when he was five years old, leaving his mother to raise three children on her own. He graduated from Dickinson College where he became a member of the Sigma Chi fraternity and the Raven's Claw Honorary Society, with a B.A. in political science. He also earned his J.D. degree from Dickinson School of Law in 1980. During law school, Gerlach worked as a legislative aide in the Pennsylvania State Senate.

In 1985, Gerlach moved back to Ellwood City and worked at the Butler law firm Lindsey & Lutz. In 1986, he challenged Frank LaGrotta in the race for state representative but lost. In 1987, he returned to Chester County to work for the Lamb, Windle & McErlane law firm in West Chester, whose senior partner was then-Chester County Republican Chairman William Lamb.

== Pennsylvania Legislature ==
In preparation for the 1990 election against long time Democratic State Rep. Sam Morris, Gerlach visited 10,000 homes in the 155th District of the Pennsylvania House of Representatives, building his campaign around what he saw as the incumbent's inattentiveness to suburban sprawl. According to a local newspaper, the Daily Local News, Gerlach charged that his opponent was "out of touch" with his constituency.

Gerlach proposed expanding open-space preservation by using zoning laws to encourage developers to incorporate open space into development projects, along with the creation of environmental protection authorities.

During the election, Gerlach's Democratic opponents accused the Western Pennsylvania native of moving to Chester County for the sole purpose of running against Morris. Gerlach denied that accusation and said he moved to Chester County because he and his wife saw it as "a great place to work and raise our kids." He ultimately defeated Morris by only 23 votes out of 17,000 cast. He was reelected in 1992 with 64 percent of the vote.

Gerlach was elected to the Pennsylvania State Senate in 1994, with 67 percent of the vote, in the newly re-formed 44th district. He defeated Democrat Barry Robertson (whose campaign was heavily funded by Sam Morris, Gerlach's opponent four years earlier) in that election, and was re-elected in 1998 without opposition. While in the State Senate, he helped change the state's welfare laws.

While in the Pennsylvania House of Representatives and Pennsylvania Senate, Gerlach worked to sponsor legislation making it easier for the commonwealth's patchwork of municipalities to work together to preserve open space. Gov. Tom Ridge signed Gerlach's legislation into law in 2000.

== U.S. House of Representatives ==
Gerlach was first elected to the United States House of Representatives in 2002 from the newly created 6th District, sometimes called the "Pterodactyl District" because of its unusual shape; it twisted and wound its way through the outer western suburbs of Philadelphia. Although the district was reportedly drawn to elect a Republican, he had a somewhat difficult time holding onto it in elections, largely due to the growing Democratic trend in the Philadelphia suburbs. On January 6, 2014 Gerlach announced that he would not seek reelection, "to spend more time with my wife and family."

=== Legislative action and stances ===
==== Environment, conservation, and development ====
Gerlach has strongly supported Schuylkill Valley commuter rail. At one point he said of the Bush administration's plan to cut federal money for construction costs from 80 percent to 50 percent: "There's just not going to be enough state and local funds to do the project. It will be a dead project."

The farmland-preservation and open-space advocacy that Gerlach became known for during his tenure as a state legislator has continued during his congressional career. On September 27, 2006, the U.S. House of Representatives passed a Gerlach-sponsored bill H.R. 5313 that would make federal funds available to municipalities around the country to purchase conservation easements. This bill was never acted on by the Senate, and was re-introduced as H.R. 1152 in March 2007.

==== Military and social issues ====
In 2003, Gerlach sponsored a new law mandating a new veterans cemetery in the Philadelphia area within four years. The nearest military cemetery to accept casket burials was located 90 miles from Philadelphia.

In 2009, Gerlach opposed HR 2454, which was designed to amend several laws related to energy and the environment, and included a "cap-and-trade" program to limit greenhouse gas emissions. As Gerlach later explained, "While the bill included some positive provisions to develop alternative and renewable energy our country needs, I voted against this bill because of the devastating effect it will have on working families and the people who create jobs in my district and across Pennsylvania." The League of Conservation Voters, "a national non-profit organization that works to turn environmental values into national priorities," rated Gerlach at 44 percent on their National Environmental Scorecard. In his 2010 campaign, Gerlach received $41,250 from the Energy/Natural Resource sector.

Gerlach voted against H. Con. Res. 63, which disapproved of The Surge; he said it was meaningless, fundamentally vague and would damage troop morale.

He was one of four Pennsylvania Republicans (the others were Todd Platts, Charlie Dent, and Phil English) to vote to add sexual orientation and gender identity to the federal hate crimes bill. Mr. Gerlach also opposes the Federal Marriage Amendment, which would have amended the constitution to define marriage as a union between one man and one woman. In 2007, Gerlach voted against a bill that would have repealed "Don't Ask, Don't Tell." In 2010, Gerlach also voted against the "2010-2011 Defense Appropriations Act," which would have included a repeal of "Don't Ask, Don't Tell" after military certification and review. Gerlach defended this vote, saying, "Voting on this issue six months before Defense Secretary Robert Gates is scheduled to issue a thorough review of the policy and how best to implement any changes does nothing to improve the security of our country or the morale of the brave men and women serving in our military." In 2007-2008, Gerlach received a 64 percent support rating from the Family Research Council, an interest group whose mission statement commits it to being an organization that "shapes public debate and formulates public policy that values human life and upholds the institutions of marriage and the family."

==== Business, industry, and regulation ====
Gerlach has advocated the passage of legislation that would expand federal regulation of so-called "puppy mills," and cosponsored medical liability legislation.

In 2010, Gerlach voted against the "Health Care and Insurance Law Amendments," also known as HR 3590 or "The Health Care Reform Bill." In a statement on the Health Care vote, Gerlach stated that the bill was "written behind closed doors," and that it "ushers in a new era of big government." Gerlach also expressed concerns about the bill's impact on his constituents, saying "In my district, innovation, investment and jobs in the life sciences and biotechnology sector will be at risk because of a new $2 billion per year tax on items used for cancer screening, knee and hip replacement surgery and other life-saving procedures."

=== Committee assignments ===
- Committee on Ways and Means
  - Subcommittee on Oversight
  - Subcommittee on Health

=== Caucus memberships ===
- Congressional COPD Caucus
- German-American Caucus – Gerlach co-founded the Caucus with Rep. Tim Holden (D-Pennsylvania)
- House Land Conservation Caucus
- House Land Trust Caucus
- House Ukraine Caucus
- International Conservation Caucus
- Congressional Arts Caucus
- Small Brewer Caucus
- Congressional Cement Caucus

== Political positions ==
Gerlach is a member of two moderate political groups: the Republican Main Street Partnership, which supports government-funded embryonic stem-cell research; and Republicans for Environmental Protection. The liberal Americans for Democratic Action rated Gerlach's 2005 voting record at 35 points out of 100; the American Conservative Union ranked him at 56 points, on the same scale. The American Public Health Association scored Representative Gerlach's support record at 44 percent in 2009.

=== Environmental conservation ===
In 2013, Gerlach and Congressman Mike Thompson (D-Calif.) introduced the Conservation Easement Incentive Act. The act would give tax benefits to property owners who preserve their land for conservation.

=== Post-Congress work ===
In 2015, Gerlach was announced as the new president and chief executive officer of BIPAC, the Business-Industry Political Action Committee. Prior to joining BIPAC and since leaving Congress, Gerlach had been working at Venable LLP. He is also a member of the ReFormers Caucus of Issue One.

On March 6, 2020, the board of directors from the Greater Reading Chamber Alliance announced that Gerlach had been named president and CEO of the organization.

== Political campaigns ==
=== 2002 ===
In 2002, he defeated Dan Wofford, son of former U.S. Senator Harris Wofford, by 51.4 percent to 48.6 percent.

In a 2002 PoliticsPA feature story designating politicians with yearbook superlatives, he was named the "Most Likely to Succeed."

=== 2004 ===
In 2004, Gerlach won a close re-election against Democrat Lois Murphy, by 51.0 percent to 49.0 percent.

=== 2006 ===
In their rematch in 2006, Gerlach again beat Murphy by an even narrower margin of 50.6 percent to 49.4 percent (unofficial results as of November 8, 2006). Gerlach was the only member of the "Philly Trio" of vulnerable Republican Congressmen (the others being Curt Weldon and Mike Fitzpatrick) to survive the 2006 election. He overcame a negative political climate that included the then-unpopular war in Iraq, an unpopular president and a well-liked Democratic governor. Geography also played a factor; similar to the previous two cycles Gerlach carried Chester County, Berks County, and Lehigh County by significant margins, while Murphy carried the heavily Democratic Montgomery County portion of the district.

=== 2008 ===
In the 2008 election, Gerlach defeated Democratic nominee Bob Roggio to win a fourth term.

In all three contests, Gerlach survived by swamping his Democratic opponents in Chester County, where he resides.

=== 2010 ===
In February 2009, Gerlach formed a committee to explore a run for Governor of Pennsylvania in the 2010 election. Gerlach ended his campaign for governor on January 7, 2010.

Gerlach had been mentioned as a potential candidate for the United States Senate seat held by Arlen Specter after John Cornyn, chair of the National Republican Senatorial Committee, contacted him following Specter's May 2009 party-switch. However, he ultimately decided not to run for the Senate and instead sought reelection to the House. He faced the Democratic nominee Manan Trivedi, an Iraq war veteran and physician, but won re-election with 57% of the vote.

=== 2012 ===
Gerlach was again challenged by Democratic nominee Manan Trivedi. Once again, he prevailed over Trivedi at 57 to 43%. He got a substantial assist from the post-census redistricting. The 6th was pushed to the west, extending a tendril across Berks County to grab much of heavily Republican Lebanon County. While Barack Obama carried the old 6th with 58 percent of the vote in 2008, Obama would have only won the new 6th with 53 percent. Ultimately, Mitt Romney narrowly carried the new 6th with just over 50 percent of the vote.

== Personal life ==
Gerlach has three children and three step-children. He currently lives in Chester Springs.

U.S. House of Representatives
Preceded by Tim Holden	Member of the U.S. House of Representatives from Pennsylvania's 6th congressional district 2003–2015	Succeeded by Ryan Costello
U.S. order of precedence (ceremonial)
Preceded by Todd R. Platts as Former U.S. Representative	Order of precedence of the United States as Former U.S. Representative	Succeeded by Charlie Dent as Former U.S. Representative
