= Pennsylvania House of Representatives, District 81 =

American legislative district

Pennsylvania's 81st State House of Representatives district
Representative
Rich Irvin; R–Spruce Creek Township
- Population (2022): 64,708

The 81st Pennsylvania House of Representatives District is located in central Pennsylvania and has been represented by Rich Irvin since 2015.

== District profile ==
The 81st District is located in Franklin County and Huntingdon County and includes the following areas:

Franklin County

- Fannett Township
- Letterkenny Township
- Lurgan Township
- Metal Township
- Orrstown
- Shippensburg (Franklin County Portion)
- Southampton Township
- St. Thomas Township

Huntingdon County

- Alexandria
- Barree Township
- Brady Township
- Broad Top City
- Carbon Township
- Cass Township
- Cassville
- Clay Township
- Coalmont
- Cromwell Township
- Dublin Township
- Dudley
- Henderson Township
- Hopewell Township
- Huntingdon
- Jackson Township
- Juniata Township
- Lincoln Township
- Logan Township
- Mapleton
- Marklesburg
- Mill Creek
- Miller Township
- Morris Township
- Mount Union
- Oneida Township
- Orbisonia
- Penn Township
- Petersburg
- Porter Township
- Rockhill
- Saltillo
- Shade Gap
- Shirley Township
- Shirleysburg
- Smithfield Township
- Springfield Township
- Spruce Creek Township
- Tell Township
- Three Springs
- Todd Township
- Union Township
- Walker Township
- West Township
- Wood Township

== Representatives ==
Representative	Party	Years	District home	Note
Prior to 1969, seats were apportioned by county.
Orville E. Snare	Republican	1969 – 1970		
Samuel E. Hayes, Jr.	Republican	1971 – 1992		
Larry O. Sather	Republican	1993 – 2006	McConnellstown	
Mike Fleck	Republican	2007 – 2014	Three Springs	
Rich Irvin	Republican	2015 – present	Spruce Creek Township	

== Recent election results ==
PA House election, 2024: Pennsylvania House, District 81
Party	Candidate	Votes	%
Republican	Rich Irvin (incumbent)	26,840	79.37
Democratic	Sean Steeg	6,975	20.63
Total votes		33,815	100.00
Republican hold			

PA House election, 2022: Pennsylvania House, District 81
Party	Candidate	Votes	%
Republican	Rich Irvin (incumbent)	20,424	75.14
Democratic	Ian Kidd	6,759	24.86
Total votes		27,183	100.00
Republican hold			

PA House election, 2020: Pennsylvania House, District 81
Party	Candidate	Votes	%
Republican	Rich Irvin (incumbent)	23,361	68.75
Democratic	Ian Kidd	10,618	31.25
Total votes		33,979	100.00
Republican hold			

PA House election, 2018: Pennsylvania House, District 81
Party	Candidate	Votes	%
Republican	Rich Irvin (incumbent)	15,579	62.52
Democratic	Richard Rogers, Sr.	8,619	34.59
Libertarian	Joseph Soloski	721	2.89
Total votes		24,919	100.00
Republican hold			

PA House election, 2016: Pennsylvania House, District 81
Party	Candidate	Votes	%
Republican	Rich Irvin (incumbent)	18,974	63.74
Democratic	Richard Rogers, Sr.	10,796	36.26
Total votes		29,770	100.00
Republican hold			
