= Orville Snare =

American politician

Orville E. Snare

Member of the Pennsylvania House of Representatives from the 81st district
- In office January 7, 1969 – November 30, 1970
- Preceded by: District Created
- Succeeded by: Samuel Hayes

Member of the Pennsylvania House of Representatives from the Huntingdon County district
- In office 1957–1968

Personal details
- Born: July 3, 1918 McConnellstown, Pennsylvania, U.S.
- Died: July 13, 2006 (aged 88) Huntingdon, Pennsylvania, U.S.
- Party: Republican

Orville E. Snare (July 3, 1918 – July 13, 2006) was a former Republican member of the Pennsylvania House of Representatives.
