= Larry Sather =

American politician (1940–2022)

Larry O. Sather

Member of the Pennsylvania House of Representatives from the 81st district
- In office January 5, 1993 – November 30, 2006
- Preceded by: Samuel Hayes
- Succeeded by: Mike Fleck

Personal details
- Born: December 28, 1940 McConnellstown, Pennsylvania, U.S.
- Died: October 2, 2022 (aged 81) Huntingdon, Pennsylvania, U.S.
- Party: Republican
- Spouse: Jean M. Sather (deceased)

Larry O. Sather (December 28, 1940 – October 2, 2022) was an American politician who was a Republican member of the Pennsylvania House of Representatives.

Sather was a 1959 graduate of Huntingdon Area High School.

Sather was first elected to represent the 81st legislative district in the Pennsylvania House of Representatives in 1992. He retired prior to the 2006 elections. Sather died on October 2, 2022, in Huntingdon at the age of 81.
