= Henderson Township, Huntingdon County, Pennsylvania =

Township in Pennsylvania, US

Coordinates: 40°29′00″N 77°57′59″W

- Township
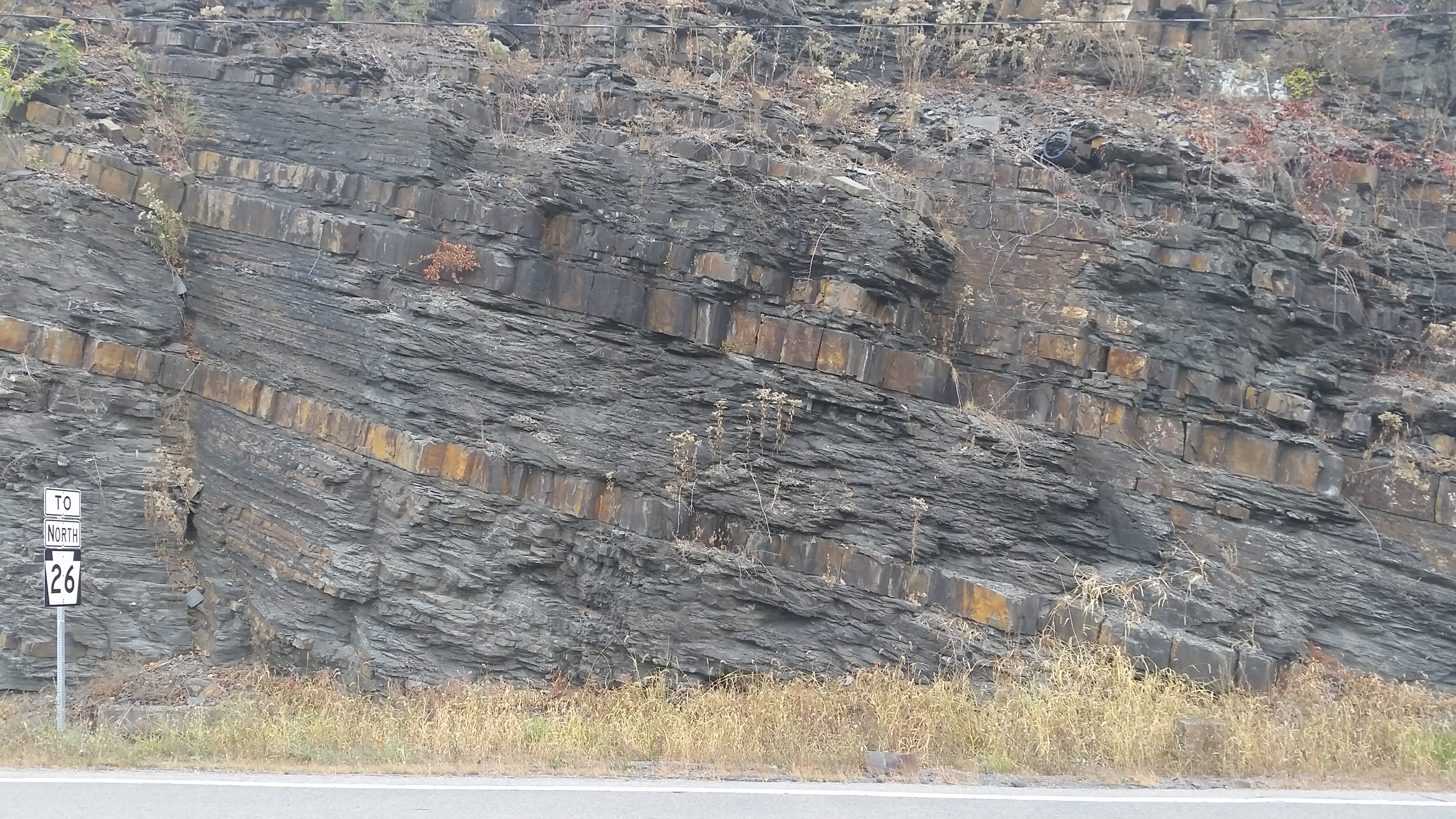
- Brallier Formation near PA 26 in Henderson Township

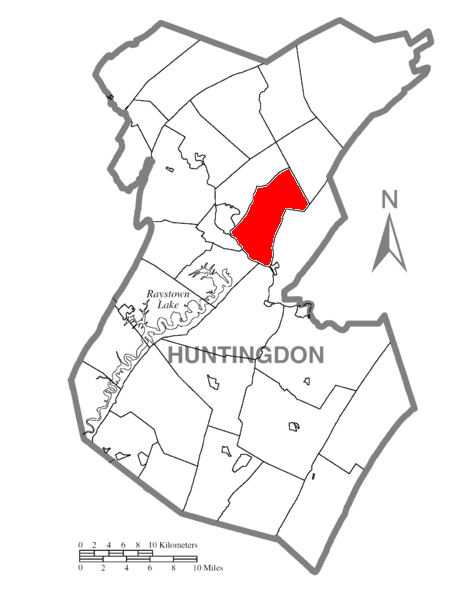
- Map of Huntingdon County, Pennsylvania Highlighting Henderson Township

- Map of Huntingdon County, Pennsylvania
- Country: United States
- State: Pennsylvania
- County: Huntingdon

Area
  - Total: 26.29 sq mi (68.09 km^{2})
  - Land: 26.16 sq mi (67.76 km^{2})
  - Water: 0.13 sq mi (0.33 km^{2})

Population (2020)
  - Total: 923 ▼
  - Estimate (2022): 913
  - Density: 35/sq mi (13.4/km^{2})
- Time zone: UTC-5 (Eastern (EST))
  - Summer (DST): UTC-4 (EDT)
- Zip code: 16652, 17060
- Area code: 814
- FIPS code: 42-061-33808
- Local phone exchanges: 506, 641, 643, 644

Henderson Township is a township which is located in Huntingdon County, Pennsylvania, United States. The population was 923 at the time of the 2020 census.

This township includes the village of Ardenheim.

== History ==
The Pennsylvania Canal Guard Lock and Feeder Dam, Raystown Branch was listed on the National Register of Historic Places in 1990.

== Geography ==
According to the United States Census Bureau, the township has a total area of 26.0 square miles (67 km^{2}), of which 25.9 square miles (67 km^{2}) is land and 0.1 square miles (0.26 km^{2}) (0.50%) is water.

=== Adjacent Municipalities ===
All municipalities listed are in Huntingdon County unless otherwise noted.

- Mill Creek borough
- Huntingdon borough
- Brady Township
- Union Township
- Juniata Township
- Smithfield Township
- Oneida Township
- Miller Township

== Demographics ==
Historical population
Census	Pop.	Note	%±
2000	972		—
2010	933		−4.0%
2020	923		−1.1%
2022 (est.)	913		−1.1%
U.S. Decennial Census

As of the census of 2010, there were 933 people and 394 households within the township.

The population density was 35.9 inhabitants per square mile (13.9/km^{2}). There were 544 housing units at an average density of 20.9/sq mi (8.1/km^{2}).

The racial makeup of the township was 99.14% White, 0.32% African American, 0.11% other races, and 0.43% from two or more races. Hispanic or Latino of any race were 0.43% of the population.

There were 394 households, out of which 25.4% had children under the age of eighteen living with them; 64.3% were married couples living together, 5.6% had a female householder with no husband present, and 25.8% were non-families. 22.5% of all households were made up of individuals, and 7.8% had someone living alone who was sixty-five years of age or older.

The average household size was 2.46 and the average family size was 2.85.

In the township the population was spread out, with 19.0% under the age of eighteen, 2.0% from eighteen to nineteen, 3.4% from twenty to twenty-four, 8.7% from twenty-five to thirty-four, 20.5% from thirty-five to forty-nine, 29.0% from fifty to sixty-four, and 17.4% who were sixty-five years of age or older.

The median age was forty-one years. The population was 50.70% male, and 49.30% female.
