= Ardenheim, Pennsylvania =

Unincorporated community in Pennsylvania, US

- Unincorporated community
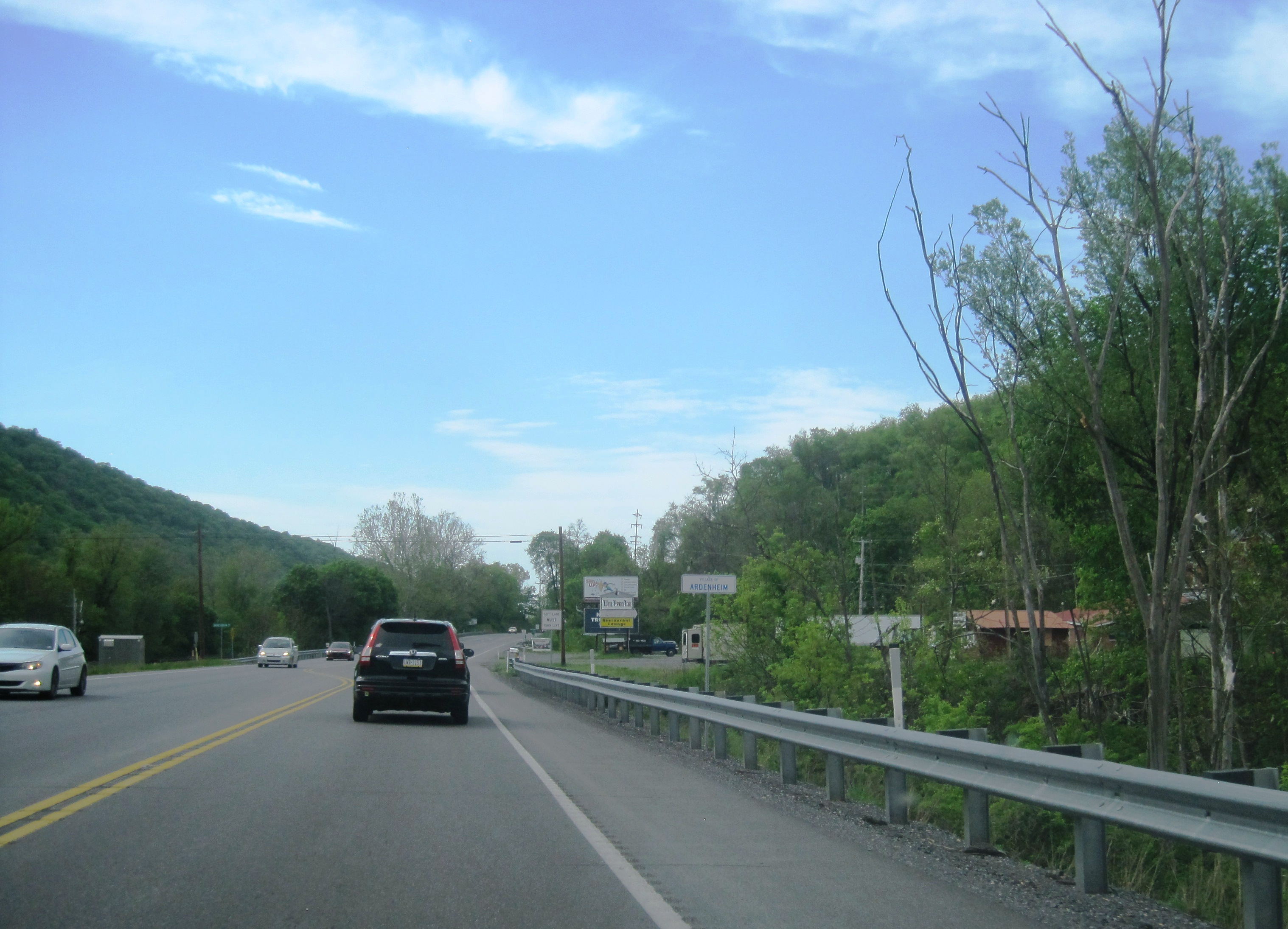
- US 22 entering Ardenheim

- Location within Pennsylvania Location within the United States
- Coordinates: 40°27′51″N 77°59′0″W
- Country: United States
- State: Pennsylvania
- County: Huntingdon
- Township: Henderson
- Elevation: 610 ft (190 m)
- Time zone: UTC-5 (Eastern (EST))
  - Summer (DST): UTC-4 (EDT)
- ZIP codes: 16652
- GNIS feature ID: 1168377

Ardenheim is an unincorporated community in Henderson Township, Huntingdon County, Pennsylvania about 4 miles east of Huntingdon. This village is where the Raystown Branch and Frankstown Branch of the Juniata River meet. Ardenheim is located between the boroughs of Huntingdon and Mill Creek.

== General information ==
- ZIP Code: 16652
- Area Code: 814
- Local Phone Exchanges: 641, 643, 644
- School District: Huntingdon Area School District
