= Oneida Township, Pennsylvania =

Township in Pennsylvania, US

Coordinates: 40°29′30″N 77°59′29″W

- Township
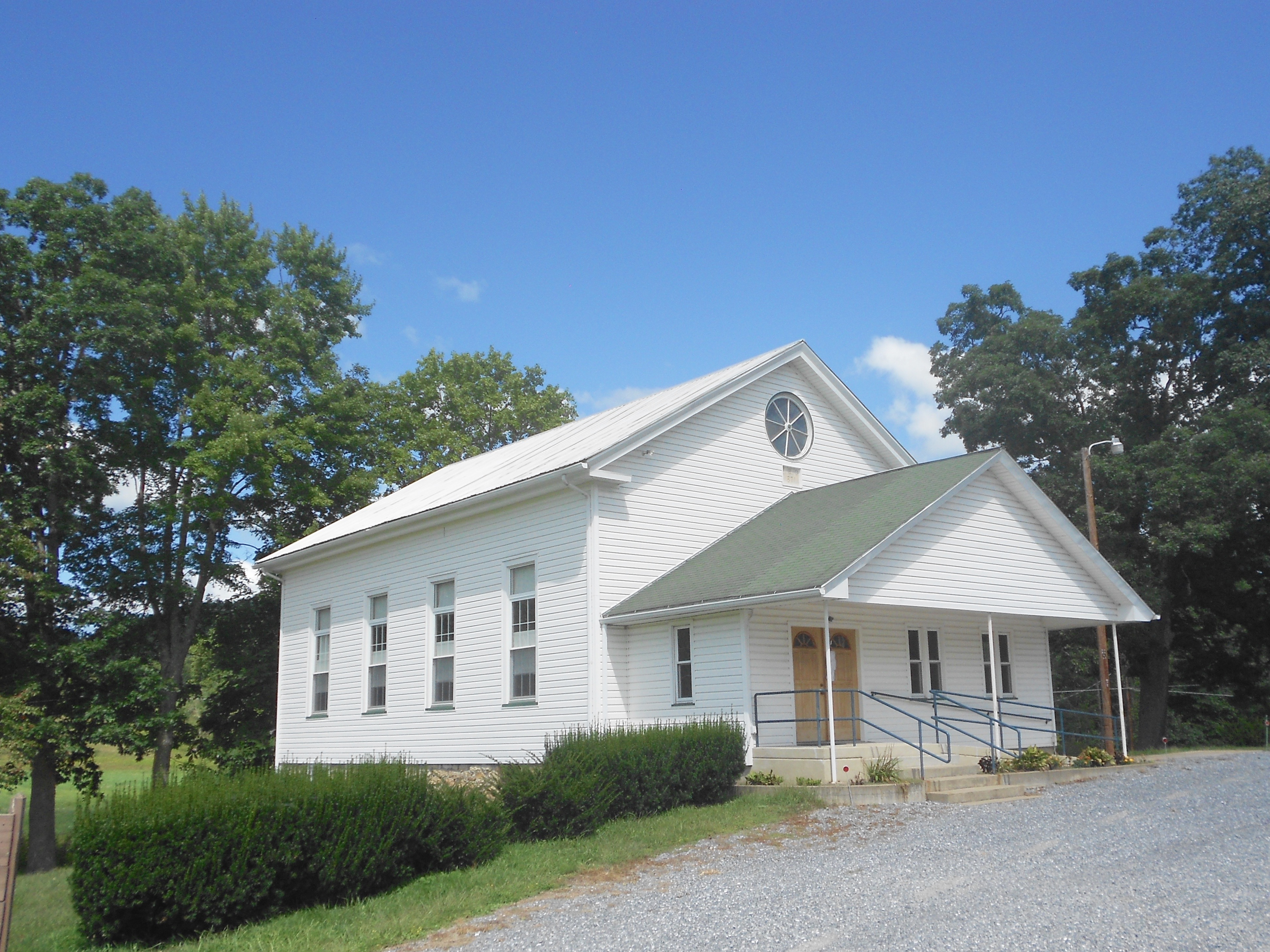
- United Methodist Church in Donation

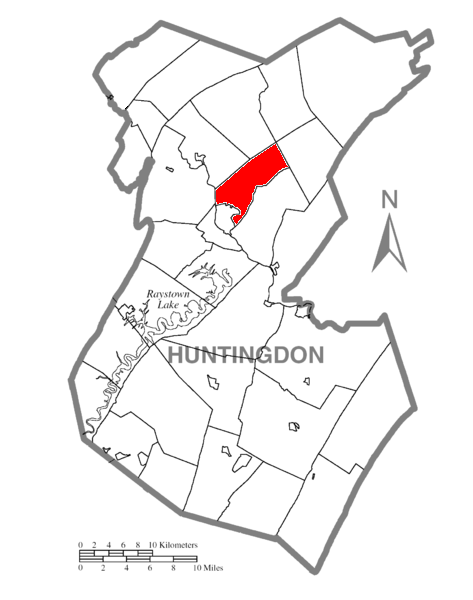
- Map of Huntingdon County, Pennsylvania Highlighting Oneida Township

- Map of Huntingdon County, Pennsylvania
- Country: United States
- State: Pennsylvania
- County: Huntingdon

Area
  - Total: 17.57 sq mi (45.51 km^{2})
  - Land: 17.54 sq mi (45.44 km^{2})
  - Water: 0.023 sq mi (0.06 km^{2})

Population (2020)
  - Total: 1,012 ▼
  - Density: 57.7/sq mi (22.27/km^{2})
- Time zone: UTC-5 (Eastern (EST))
  - Summer (DST): UTC-4 (EDT)
- Zip code: 16652
- Area code: 814
- FIPS code: 42-061-56808
- Website: https://oneidatwp.com/
- Local phone exchanges: 641, 643, 644, 667

Oneida Township is a township that is located in Huntingdon County, Pennsylvania, United States. The population was 1,012 at the time of the 2020 census.

This township includes the villages of Donation, Center Union, and Cold Springs.

== Geography ==
According to the United States Census Bureau, the township has a total area of 17.6 square miles (45.7 km^{2}), of which 17.6 square miles (45.6 km^{2}) is land and 0.04 square mile (0.1 km^{2}) (0.17%) is water.

== Municipal Building ==
Oneida Township Municipal Building
9784 Standing Stone Rd, Huntingdon, PA 16652

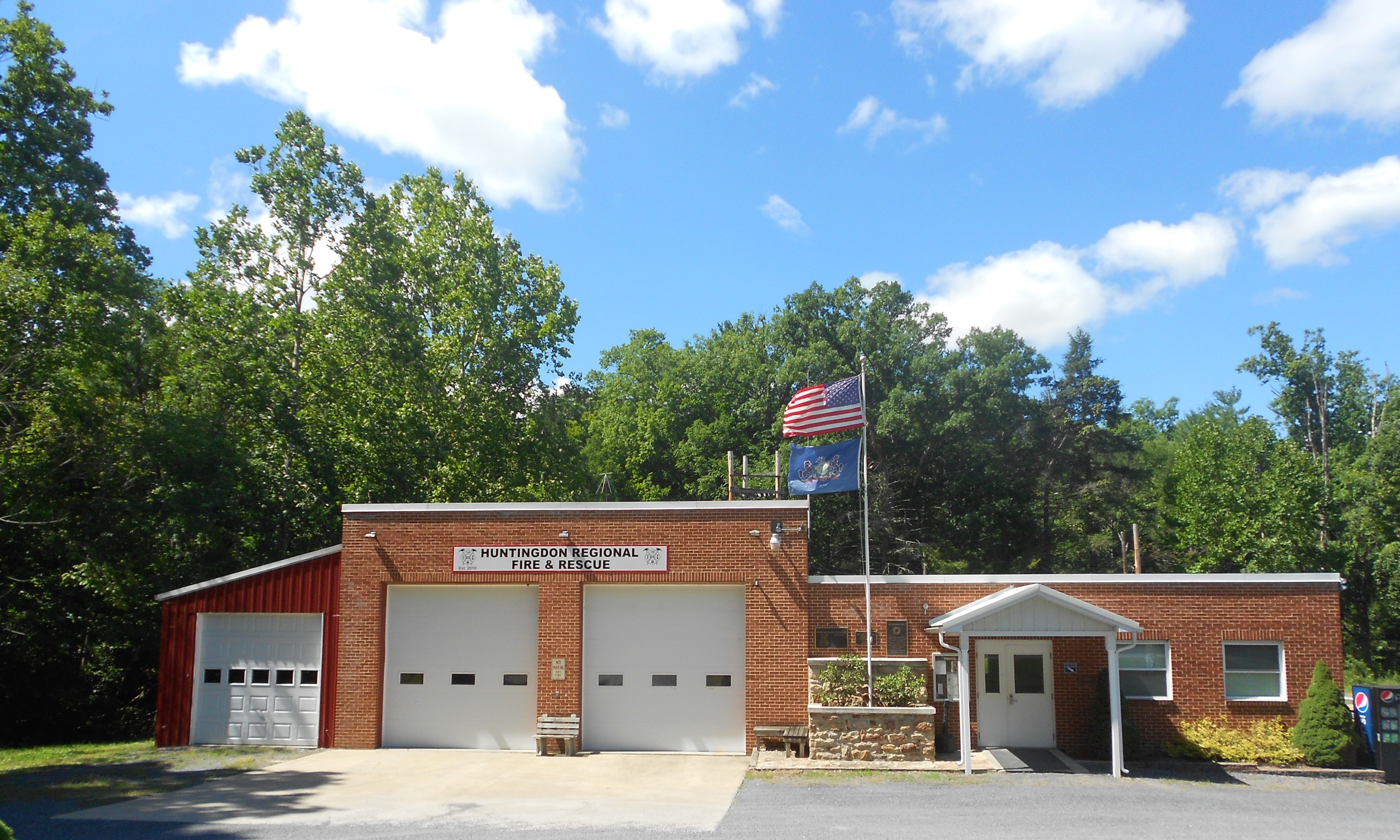
Municipal Building

== Adjacent municipalities ==
All municipalities are located in Huntingdon County unless otherwise noted.

- Huntingdon borough
- Henderson Township
- Miller Township
- Barree Township
- West Township
- Logan Township
- Porter Township
- Smithfield Township

== Demographics ==
Historical population
Census	Pop.	Note	%±
1990	1,085		—
2000	1,129		4.1%
2010	1,077		−4.6%
2020	1,012		−6.0%
2022 (est.)	1,000		−1.2%
U.S. Decennial Census

As of the census of 2000, there were 1,129 people, 466 households, and 358 families residing in the township.

The population density was 64.1 inhabitants per square mile (24.7/km^{2}). There were 511 housing units at an average density of 29.0 per square mile (11.2/km^{2}).

The racial makeup of the township was 98.32% White, 0.71% African American, 0.09% Native American, 0.80% Asian, and 0.09% from two or more races. Hispanic or Latino of any race were 0.09% of the population.

There were 466 households, out of which 28.8% had children under the age of eighteen living with them; 66.3% were married couples living together, 7.5% had a female householder with no husband present, and 23.0% were non-families. 19.7% of all households were made up of individuals, and 7.9% had someone living alone who was sixty-five years of age or older.

The average household size was 2.42 and the average family size was 2.78.

Within the township, the population was spread out, with 22.1% of residents who were under the age of eighteen, 5.0% who were aged eighteen to twenty-four, 26.4% who were aged twenty-five to forty-four, 29.2% who were aged forty-five to sixty-four, and 17.4% who were sixty-five years of age or older. The median age was forty-four years.

For every one hundred females there were 98.1 males. For every one hundred females who were aged eighteen or older, there were 96.4 males.

The median income for a household in the township was $41,438, and the median income for a family was $45,284. Males had a median income of $37,614 compared with that of $25,208 for females.

The per capita income for the township was $19,729.

Approximately 3.5% of families and 7.9% of the population were living below the poverty line, including 14.5% of those who were under the age of eighteen and 6.6% of those who were aged sixty-five or older.
