= Samuel E. Hayes Jr. =

American politician (born 1940)

Member of the Pennsylvania House of Representatives from the 81st district
- In office January 5, 1971 – November 30, 1992
- Preceded by: Orville Snare
- Succeeded by: Larry Sather

Republican Leader of the Pennsylvania House of Representatives
- In office January 6, 1981 – November 30, 1982
- Preceded by: Matt Ryan
- Succeeded by: Matt Ryan

Republican Whip of the Pennsylvania House of Representatives
- In office January 6, 1983 – November 30, 1988
- Preceded by: Rick Cessar
- Succeeded by: John Perzel
- In office January 2, 1979 – November 30, 1980
- Preceded by: Matt Ryan
- Succeeded by: Rick Cessar

Personal details
- Born: September 3, 1940 (age 86)
- Party: Republican

Samuel E. Hayes Jr. (born September 3, 1940) is an American politician who was a Republican member of the Pennsylvania House of Representatives from 1971 to 1992.

He is a part-time professor at Juniata College in Huntingdon, Pennsylvania, where he teaches state and local government and the legislative process.

== Biography ==
Hayes held senior leadership positions in both the legislative and executive branches of the Commonwealth of Pennsylvania. As a lawmaker and legislative leader in the Pennsylvania House of Representatives, he served as the majority leader and whip. Subsequently, Hayes served as the secretary of agriculture.

As a legislative leader, Hayes advocated for basic and higher education, authored Pennsylvania's school subsidy formula, wrote legislation to fund Pennsylvania's highway program, and increased appropriations for Pennsylvania State University's extension and agricultural research.

As secretary of agriculture, he provided the leadership to establish the model protocols to eradicate avian influenza in poultry flocks and the plum pox virus in fruit orchards, established Pennsylvania as a national leader in farmland preservation, and expanded the Pennsylvania Farm Show complex to the largest exposition facility in the U.S.

Hayes has served as a member of multiple boards and commissions, including the Pennsylvania State Board of Education. He has chaired the Pennsylvania Farmland Preservation Board, the Pennsylvania Farm Show Commission, the State Conservation Commission, and the Pennsylvania Animal Health Commission, and also served as president of the Pennsylvania FFA Foundation.

In addition, Hayes served as a member of the board of trustees at Penn State from 1997 to 2014 and is currently a trustee emeritus.

Hayes has received multiple awards from Pennsylvania, national, and international organizations, including an Honorary Doctor of Laws degree from Juniata College, the Penn State Alumni Association's Alumni Fellow Award, the Distinguished Service Award from both the Pennsylvania Farm Bureau and Penn Ag Industries, and the highest award bestowed by the University of Guanajuato on a person living outside of the Republic of Mexico.

A Vietnam War veteran, Hayes was also selected for the inaugural class of the National Army ROTC Hall of Fame.

== Personal life ==
Hayes and his wife, Elizabeth Keister ’63, live in Warriors Mark, Pa., and have three sons: Samuel, III; Lee; and Erick.
