= Rich Irvin =

American politician

Richard Irvin

Member of the Pennsylvania House of Representatives from the 81st district
- Incumbent
- Assumed office January 6, 2015
- Preceded by: Mike Fleck

Personal details
- Born: July 7, 1971 (age 55) Tyrone, Pennsylvania, U.S.
- Party: Republican
- Spouse: Jaime Ewell
- Children: 4
- Education: Indiana University of Pennsylvania
- Website: repirvin.com

Richard S. Irvin (born July 7, 1971) is a Republican member of the Pennsylvania House of Representatives from the 81st legislative district, first elected in 2014.

== Early life and education ==
Irvin was born on July 7, 1971, in Tyrone, Pennsylvania. He graduated from Juniata Valley High School in 1989, and earned a Bachelor of Science degree in accounting from Indiana University of Pennsylvania in 1994.

== Political career ==
From 1996 until 2014, Irvin served as Treasurer of Huntingdon County, Pennsylvania.

In 2014, Irvin launched a primary challenge against incumbent Republican State Representative Mike Fleck to represent Pennsylvania's 81st District. Irvin was removed from the primary ballot, but ran a successful write-in campaign, defeating Fleck. In the general election, Irvin once again faced Fleck, who had won the Democratic Party nomination as a write-in candidate. Irvin ultimately won against Fleck in the general election. Irvin was later re-elected to four more consecutive terms.

In 2020, Irvin was among 26 Pennsylvania House Republicans who called for the reversal of Joe Biden's certification as the winner of Pennsylvania's electoral votes in the 2020 United States presidential election, citing false claims of election irregularities.

== Personal life ==
Irvin is married to his wife, Jaime Ewell. The couple lives in Spruce Creek Township, Pennsylvania, with their four children.
