= Huntingdon Borough Historic District =

Historic district in Pennsylvania, United States

- U.S. National Register of Historic Places
- U.S. Historic district
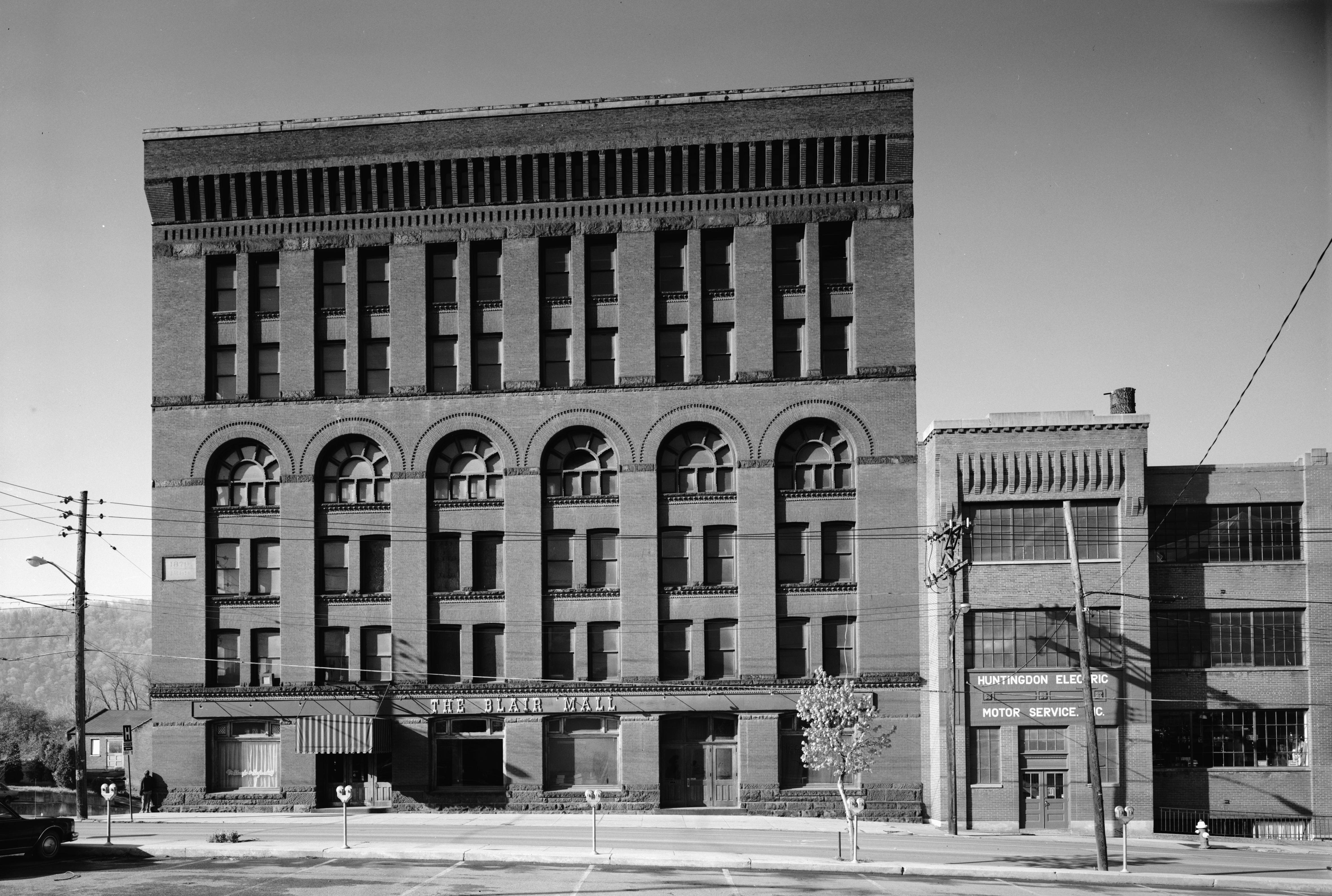
- Blair Company Building A, May 1989

- Location within Pennsylvania Location within the United States
- Location: Roughly bounded by Moore, Second, Allegheny, and Ninth Sts., Huntingdon, Pennsylvania
- Coordinates: 40°29′10″N 78°00′41″W
- Area: 87 acres (35 ha)
- Built: 1787
- Architect: Smith, William; Et al.
- Architectural style: Federal, Italianate, Queen Anne
- NRHP reference No.: 86000852
- Added to NRHP: April 24, 1986

The Huntingdon Borough Historic District is a national historic district in Huntingdon, Pennsylvania.

It was listed on the National Register of Historic Places in 1986.

== History and architectural features ==
This district includes 521 contributing buildings which are located in the central business district and surrounding residential areas of Huntingdon. They date from the late-eighteenth century to the early-twentieth century, and are primarily two- and three-story brick or frame structures. The buildings are reflective of popular architectural styles including Federal, Italianate, and Queen Anne.

Notable buildings include the county jail (1829), Union Depot (1872), Penn Hunt Hotel (1873-1874), switching tower (c. 1900), Fisher and McMurtie's Store (c. 1850), Reed's Drug Store (1865), Port Building (1875), Iron Front Store (1884), and Blair Building (1889).

It was listed on the National Register of Historic Places in 1986.

== 2020 Fire ==
On May 12, 2020, at approximately midnight, the workshop area of the Blair Building caught fire. More than a hundred people lost their apartments and the entire building was declared a loss.
