= Juniata Township, Huntingdon County, Pennsylvania =

Township in Pennsylvania, US

Coordinates: 40°25′00″N 78°02′59″W

- Township
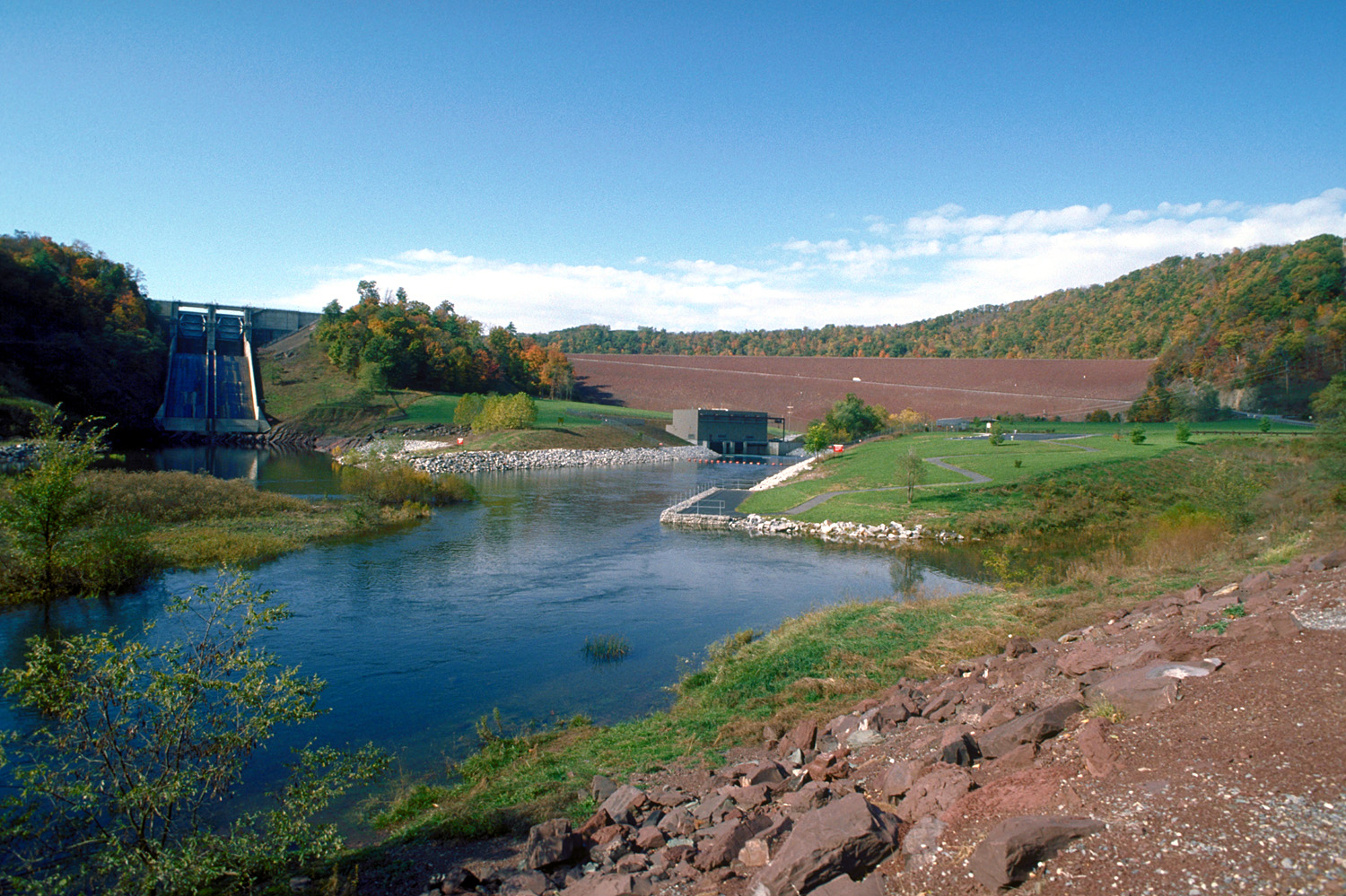
- The dam for Raystown Lake

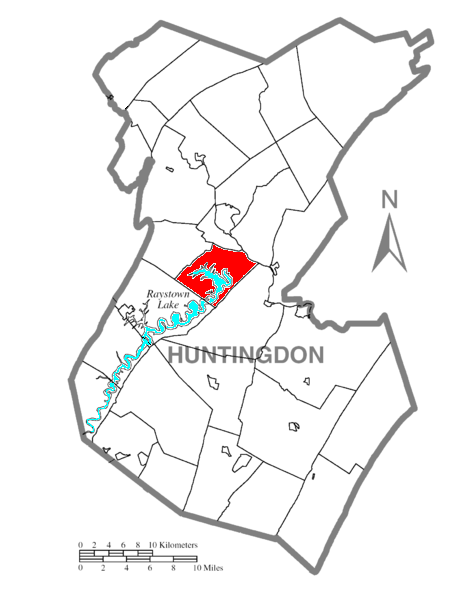
- Map of Huntingdon County, Pennsylvania Highlighting Juniata Township

- Map of Huntingdon County, Pennsylvania
- Country: United States
- State: Pennsylvania
- County: Huntingdon

Area
  - Total: 20.17 sq mi (52.24 km^{2})
  - Land: 16.72 sq mi (43.31 km^{2})
  - Water: 3.45 sq mi (8.94 km^{2})

Population (2020)
  - Total: 433 ▼
  - Estimate (2022): 425
  - Density: 32.8/sq mi (12.65/km^{2})
- Time zone: UTC-5 (Eastern (EST))
  - Summer (DST): UTC-4 (EDT)
- Zip code: 16652
- Area code: 814
- FIPS code: 42-061-38608
- Website: https://juniatatwp.com/
- Local phone exchanges: 641, 643, 644

Juniata Township is a township that is located in Huntingdon County, Pennsylvania, United States. The population was 433 at the time of the 2020 census.

== Geography ==
According to the United States Census Bureau, the township has a total area of 20.1 square miles (52 km^{2}), of which 16.5 square miles (43 km^{2}) is land and 3.6 square miles (9.3 km^{2}) (17.85%) is water.

=== Adjacent Municipalities ===
All municipalities are located in Huntingdon County unless otherwise noted.

- Smithfield Township
- Henderson Township
- Union Township
- Walker Township
- Penn Township

== Demographics ==
Historical population
Census	Pop.	Note	%±
2000	553		—
2010	554		0.2%
2020	433		−21.8%
2022 (est.)	425		−1.8%
U.S. Decennial Census

At the 2010 census there were 554 people and 235 households within the township.

The population density was 33.6 inhabitants per square mile (13.0/km^{2}). There were 451 housing units at an average density of 21.3/sq mi (8.2/km^{2}).

The racial makeup of the township was 99.46% White, 0.18% African American, 0.18% Asian, and 0.18% from two or more races. Hispanic or Latino of any race were 0.18%.

There were 235 households; 26.0% had children under the age of eighteen living with them, 67.0% were married couples living together, 3.6% had a female householder with no husband present, and 26.8% were non-families. 23.2% of households were made up of individuals, and 9.8% were one-person households with a resident aged sixty-five or older.

The average household size was 2.46 and the average family size was 2.87.

The age distribution was 18.4% under the age of eighteen, 2.2% from eighteen to nineteen, 5.4% from twenty to twenty-four, 6.9% from twenty-five to thirty-four, 19.9% from thirty-five to forty-nine, 25.3% from fifty to sixty-four, and 22.0% who were aged sixty-five or older. The median age was forty years. The population was 49.10% male, and 50.90% female.
