= Mike Fleck =

American politician

Michael E. Fleck

Member of the Pennsylvania House of Representatives from the 81st district
- In office January 2, 2007 – November 12, 2014
- Preceded by: Larry O. Sather
- Succeeded by: Richard Irvin

Personal details
- Born: 1973 (age 52–53) Huntingdon County, Pennsylvania
- Party: Republican
- Education: Liberty University; Shippensburg University

Michael E. Fleck (born 1973) is a Republican former member of the Pennsylvania House of Representatives for the 81st legislative district. He was first elected in 2006 to succeed the retiring Larry Sather, taking office on January 2, 2007.

On December 1, 2012, Fleck came out as gay. After his public announcement, he and Rep. Brian Sims (D - 182) became the two first openly gay state legislators in Pennsylvania. Fleck was the only out Republican legislator in the United States at the time. His coming-out announcement was ranked as one of "2012's Top Coming Out Stories" along with those of journalist Anderson Cooper, actor Matt Bomer and Good Morning America's Sam Champion.

Mike Fleck ran unopposed until 2014 when fellow Republican and write-in candidate Richard Irvin defeated him in the Republican primary election. Fleck narrowly won the Democratic nomination as a write-in candidate, but lost to Irvin in the general election.

The 2014 election was one of the most followed legislative races in the country, with Fleck being profiled in the New York Times and Governing Magazine naming him as one of the "Top 12 Legislators to Watch in 2014."

In December 2014, Fleck was appointed to newly elected Governor Tom Wolf's transition committee. In June 2015, Fleck joined the Wolf Administration as the Director of the Bureau of Workforce Partnerships and Operations, with the Department of Labor and Industry, overseeing the state's 67 Careerlink Sites.

== Early life ==
Fleck attended Southern Huntingdon County High School and earned a degree in history and a minor in youth ministry in 1995 from Liberty University. He has attended graduate courses at Shippensburg University. From 1999 to 2004 he worked as a district executive for the Boy Scouts of America in Huntingdon County. Prior to elective office, Fleck worked for Raystown Developmental Services.

== Legislative record ==
Fleck was viewed as being a moderate Republican. One of Fleck's main priorities was Charter School Reform. Fleck also fought Republican Governor Tom Corbett's proposal to privatizing prison nurses. Corbett eventually dropped the proposal. In 2012, Fleck introduced a "Correction's Officer's Bill of Rights". In 2012, Fleck's legislation to merge the Securities Commission into the Department of Banking was passed, creating the Department of Banking and Securities.

== 2014 re-election campaign ==
In late September 2013, Fleck kicked off his re-election bid. Frank Bruni profiled Mike Fleck in the Sunday New York Times on September 29, 2013. On November 14, 2013, Huntingdon County Treasurer Rich Irvin announced he was running against Fleck; Irvin stated "I am not going to accept money from special interest groups, my campaign is going to be funded from within the district boundaries … I do not want to run any kind of negative campaign."

Meanwhile, Fleck was criticized for raising money during the annual Pennsylvania Society weekend in New York City, whereupon prominent Manhattan Democratic power couple Victor and Betsy Gotbaum hosted a fundraiser for Fleck in their home. Betsy Gotbaum was the former New York City Public Advocate, and Victor Gotbaum was the executive director of DC 37, the largest and wealthiest union in the country; the Gotbaum's are close friends of Fleck and his partner Warren Licht.

Fleck told the Altoona Mirror, "People know that we don't differ on the fundamental issues the district is facing and that at the end of the day, he was simply recruited to run against me because I announced that I was gay". In April 2014, Rich Irvin was kicked off the ballot for failing to file a Financial Statement of Ethics.

Irvin waged an aggressive write-in campaign, going as far as to engage local churches to distribute campaign material from the anti-gay group the American Family Association. Irvin told the Altoona Mirror. "I absolutely do believe that I had support from different church organizations throughout the district. I'm proud of it."

On May 20, 2014, Irvin beat Fleck on the republican ballot, however, Fleck managed to win the write-in on the democratic ballot by 15 votes.

The day after the election Fleck stated "I am gay. I don't wear it on my sleeve, it doesn't define who I am, and quite frankly it's the least interesting part about me … Nevertheless, I knew that when I came out this race would be nothing more, nothing less than whether my constituency could wrap their mind around the fact that I was a gay man. People fear that which is different."

State Senator John Eichelberger told the Altoona Mirror "A lot of people thought that Mike was a homosexual" before 2012, and it wasn't an issue, Eichelberger said. "He didn't announce it and it was OK. The feeling from many people is, he put them in a very uncomfortable position. If he had just gone about his business and people thought he was a homosexual or heterosexual or whatever, there wouldn't be a problem."[34] Eichelberger's confirmation that the race was about Fleck being gay and not his politics was picked up by the national media. Senator Eichelberger's district encompasses Fleck's legislative district, Eichelberger is known for his anti-gay views.

Irvin later acknowledge there were negative attacks against Fleck because of his sexual orientation.

The negative attacks against Fleck's sexual orientation continued throughout the fall campaign. In October 2014, Huntingdon County Republican Committeeman Tom Ritchey posted a crude sex drawing depicting two men having sex and compared it to Fleck.

Fleck lost to Irvin in the general election in November 2014.

== Personal life ==
Fleck's current partner, Dr. Warren Licht, is a prominent New York City physician; in April 2016 he was named one of the top 50 over 50 in New York City. Licht is the former Chief Medical Officer of New York Downtown Hospital. New York Downtown Hospital was a few blocks from the World Trade Center; on Sept. 11th Dr. Licht took a leading role in managing the medical response. Licht is frequently quoted in the press on medical issues.

Fleck came out as a gay man on December 1, 2012. He and Democratic Rep. Brian Sims share the designation of the first openly gay members of the Pennsylvania General Assembly. However, most media outlets recognize Fleck as the first openly gay legislator as Sims wasn't sworn into office yet. Fleck was one of just two openly gay Republican state legislators in the United States, alongside Ohio state representative Tim Brown, who was sworn into office a month later.

== Awards ==
Huntingdon County Preservation Award (Huntingdon County Historical Society), 1995

Top 20 Under 40" in 2013 by the Altoona Mirror

Bob O'Connor Leadership Award, Junior Achievement of Western Pennsylvania, 2008

Tom Zuber Award Service Employees International Union Healthcare Pennsylvania (SEIU HCPA) 2012

Vigil Honor, Order of the Arrow (Monaken Lodge), 2000

Keystone Award, Pennsylvania Student Equality Coalition, 2013

Pennsylvania's "Foremost Under 40" by the Pennsylvania Business Central

Richard Crawford Award, Saint Francis Small Business Development Center, 2011
