= Walker Township, Huntingdon County, Pennsylvania =

Township in Pennsylvania, US

Coordinates: 40°28′00″N 78°04′59″W

- Township
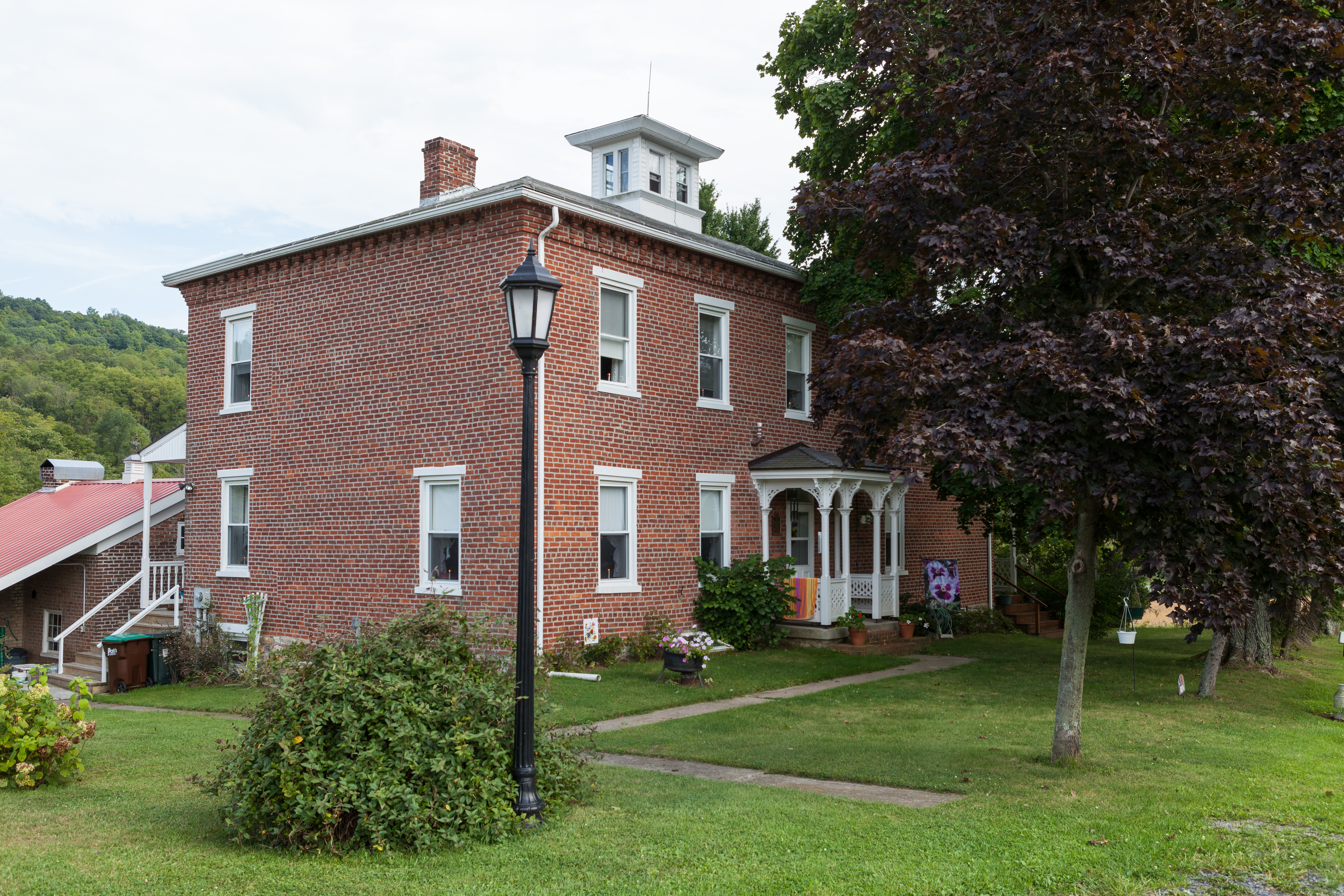
- Robb Farmhouse on Hartslog Valley Road

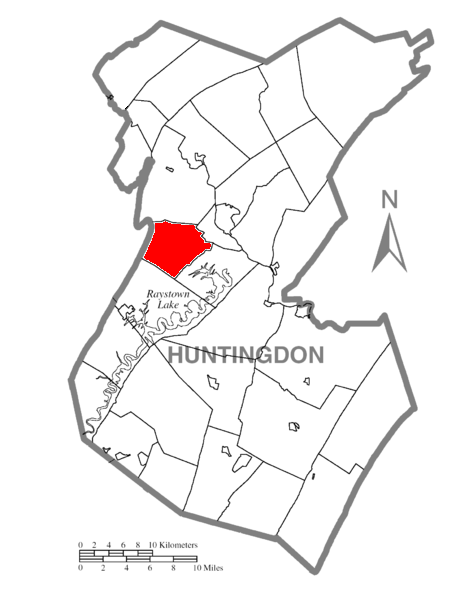
- Map of Huntingdon County, Pennsylvania Highlighting Walker Township

- Map of Huntingdon County, Pennsylvania
- Country: United States
- State: Pennsylvania
- County: Huntingdon

Area
  - Total: 18.51 sq mi (47.95 km^{2})
  - Land: 18.51 sq mi (47.94 km^{2})
  - Water: 0 sq mi (0.00 km^{2})

Population (2020)
  - Total: 1,969 ▲
  - Estimate (2022): 1,962
  - Density: 104.9/sq mi (40.51/km^{2})
- Time zone: UTC-5 (Eastern (EST))
  - Summer (DST): UTC-4 (EDT)
- Zip code: 16660
- Area code: 814
- FIPS code: 42-061-80560
- Local phone exchanges: 627

Walker Township is a township in Huntingdon County, Pennsylvania, United States. The population was 1,969 at the time of the 2020 census.

This township includes the village of McConnellstown.

== History ==
The Robb Farm was listed on the National Register of Historic Places in 2011.

== Geography ==
According to the United States Census Bureau, the township has a total area of 18.8 square miles (48.6 km^{2}), all land.

=== Adjacent municipalities ===
All municipalities are located in Huntingdon County unless otherwise noted.

- Juniata Township
- Smithfield Township
- Porter Township
- Penn Township
- Woodbury Township, Blair County

== Demographics ==
Historical population
Census	Pop.	Note	%±
2000	1,747		—
2010	1,947		11.4%
2020	1,969		1.1%
2022 (est.)	1,962		−0.4%
U.S. Decennial Census

As of the census of 2010, there were 1,947 people and 773 households within the township.

The population density was 103.6 inhabitants per square mile (40.0/km^{2}). There were 874 housing units at an average density of 46.5 per square mile (18.0/km^{2}).

The racial makeup of the township was 98.36% White, 0.15% African American, 0.15% Native American, 0.67% Asian, and 0.67% from two or more races. Hispanic or Latino of any race were 0.51% of the population.

There were 773 households, out of which 32.1% had children who were under the age of eighteen living with them; 65.9% were married couples living together, 7.5% had a female householder with no husband present, and 23.3% were non-families. 20.1% of all households were made up of individuals, and 11.4% had someone living alone who was sixty-five years of age or older.

The average household size was 2.56 and the average family size was 2.94.

Within the township, the population was spread out, with 23.3% of residents who were under the age of 18, 2.1% from 18 to 19, 3.2% from 20 to 24, 8.8% from 25 to 34, 21.8% from 35 to 49, 22.6% from 50 to 64, and 18.2% who were 65 years of age or older. The median age was 40 years.

The population was 48.84% male, and 51.16% female.

== Recreation ==
A portion of the Pennsylvania State Game Lands Number 118 is located on Tussey Mountain in the western end of the township.
