= McConnellstown, Pennsylvania =

Unincorporated community in Pennsylvania, US

- Census-designated place
- Location within Pennsylvania Location within the United States
- Coordinates: 40°27′52″N 78°04′01″W
- Country: United States
- State: Pennsylvania
- County: Huntingdon
- Township: Walker

Area
  - Total: 3.27 sq mi (8.47 km^{2})
  - Land: 3.27 sq mi (8.47 km^{2})
  - Water: 0 sq mi (0.00 km^{2})
- Elevation: 738 ft (225 m)

Population (2020)
  - Total: 1,208
  - Density: 369.5/sq mi (142.65/km^{2})
- Time zone: UTC-5 (Eastern (EST))
  - Summer (DST): UTC-4 (EDT)
- ZIP code: 16660
- FIPS code: 42-46016
- GNIS feature ID: 2630024

McConnellstown is a census-designated place in Walker Township, Huntingdon County, Pennsylvania, United States. Due to its long name, the village is often nicknamed "Mactown". The population of McConnellstown was 1,194 as of the 2010 census.

== Geography ==
The community is in central Huntingdon County, in the northeastern part of Walker Township. It is bordered to the northeast by Smithfield Township. The CDP occupies the Woodcock Valley and is bordered to the southwest and southeast by Crooked Creek, a tributary of the Juniata River.

Pennsylvania Route 26 runs the length of the community, leading northeast 5 miles (8 km) to Huntingdon, the county seat, and southwest 7 miles (11 km) to Marklesburg.

According to the U.S. Census Bureau, the CDP has an area of 3.2 square miles (8.3 km^{2}), all land.

== Demographics ==
Historical population
Census	Pop.	Note	%±
2020	1,208		—
U.S. Decennial Census

== General information ==
- ZIP Code: 16660 (Only post office box addresses use it)
- Area Code: 814
- Local Phone Exchange: 627
- School District: Huntingdon Area School District

== Schools ==
- Woodcock Valley Elementary School (closed, now home of McConnellstown Church of the Nazarene)
