= Miller Township, Huntingdon County, Pennsylvania =

Township in Pennsylvania, US

Coordinates: 40°35′00″N 77°51′59″W

- Township
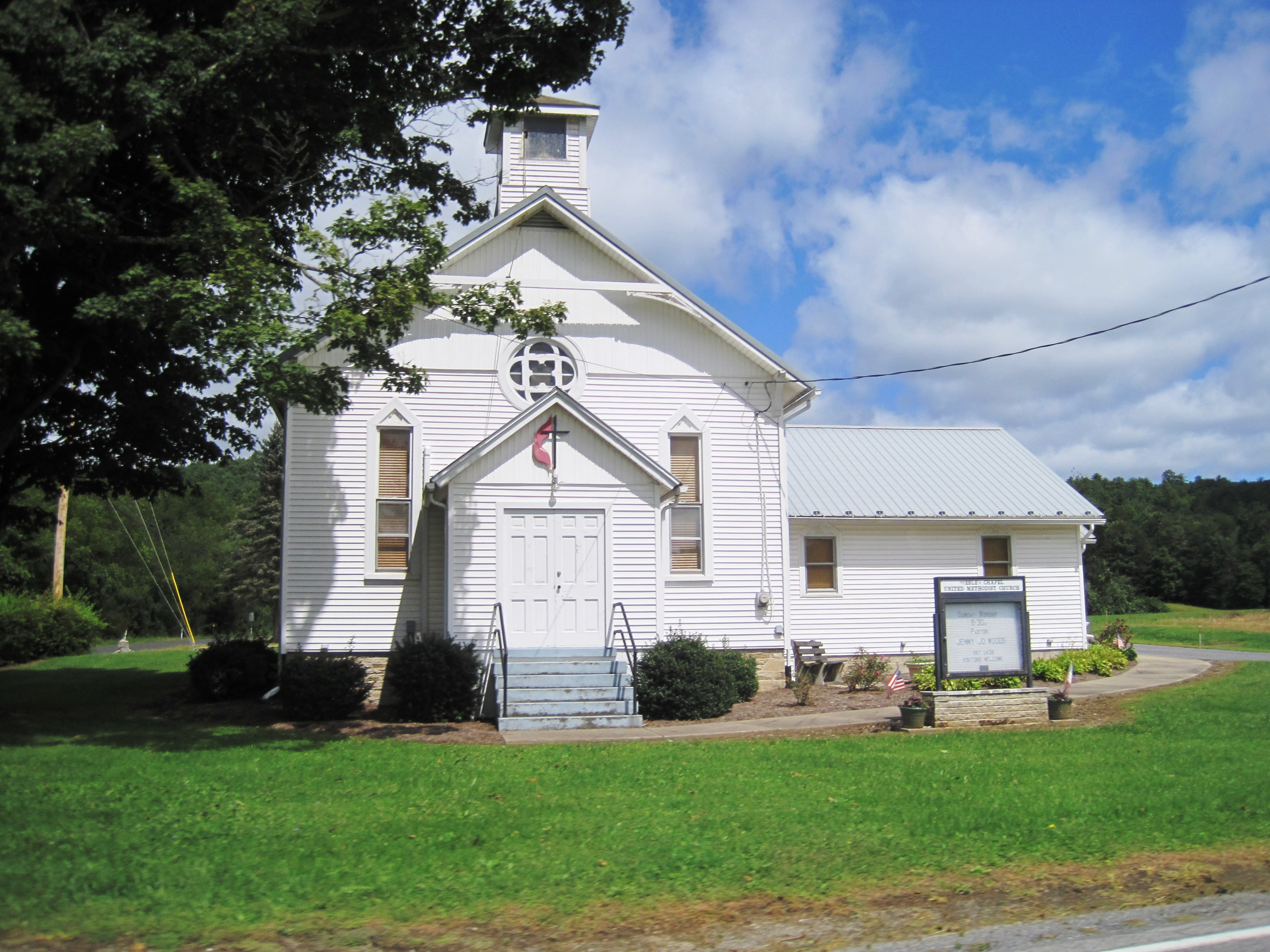
- Wesley Chapel United Methodist Church

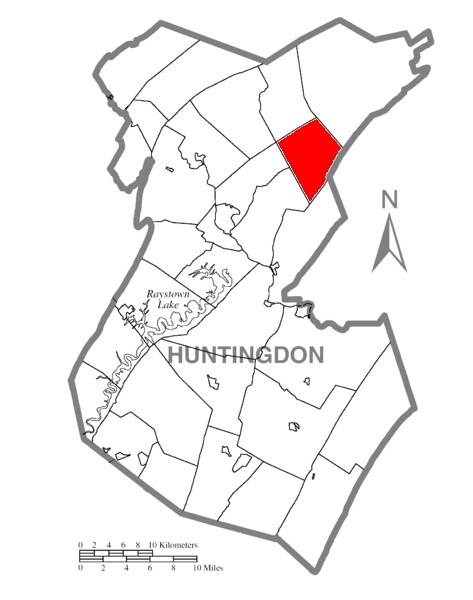
- Map of Huntingdon County, Pennsylvania Highlighting Miller Township

- Map of Huntingdon County, Pennsylvania
- Country: United States
- State: Pennsylvania
- County: Huntingdon

Area
  - Total: 22.22 sq mi (57.54 km^{2})
  - Land: 22.22 sq mi (57.54 km^{2})
  - Water: 0 sq mi (0.00 km^{2})

Population (2020)
  - Total: 457 ▼
  - Estimate (2022): 451
  - Density: 20.5/sq mi (7.93/km^{2})
- Time zone: UTC-5 (Eastern (EST))
  - Summer (DST): UTC-4 (EDT)
- Zip code: 16652
- Area code: 814
- FIPS code: 42-061-49624
- Local phone exchanges: 667

Miller Township is a township that is located in Huntingdon County, Pennsylvania, United States. The population was 457 at the time of the 2020 census.

== History ==
Following the American Revolution, Matthew Miller and his wife, Molly "Mary" Dunn, emigrated from County Donegal, Ireland to Juniata County. A few years later, they moved and settled on a beautiful piece of ground in what is now Miller Township. They occupied a large tract of land on Warrior's Ridge, most of which has remained in the possession of the family ever since. Matthew Miller became very aged, dying in 1827, it is believed, at the age of one hundred and five years. Mrs. Miller was ninety-five years old at the time of her death. Of their family of six children the only daughter, Margaret, born in Ireland, married Robert Stewart, and lived on an adjoining farm in Miller. The sons, James, David, Thomas, Samuel, and John, all became old men. At the time of formation, Miller Township's population was estimated to be between four and five hundred citizens. Today, the population is officially 514.

== The next generation ==
The James Miller married Betsey Wheeler, and in 1821 moved to the State of Ohio, settling in Greene County. David married Mary Barr, and settled on part of the homestead, but before his death moved to Mooresville, in West township. He had three sons, Stephen, William, and David, and daughters who married Robert Johnston, James Oaks, and Abraham B. Miller, of Porter. The third son, Thomas, married Sarah Coen for his first wife, and had one son, John; his second wife was Sarah Foster, and their children were sons named Samuel, James, Silas, and Thomas. Their daughters became the wives of Samuel Silknitter, James Stewart, Dorsey Silknitter, and David Cunningham, of Jackson. Samuel, the fourth son, married Charlotte Graffius, of West township, and remained on the homestead until his death in May, 1855, from injuries received by the kick of a horse. He reared a family of nine sons, whose average height was six feet, all being well-formed men, viz.: Judge Graffius Miller, of Huntingdon; Dr. Matthew, of McAlevy's Fort; James, living on the homestead; Jacob, on an adjoining farm; Abraham B., living in Porter; John S., of Huntingdon; Dr. Benjamin F., who died in Virginia in 1855; Samuel, who died on the homestead in 1861; and Dr. David P. Miller, a practicing physician of Huntingdon borough. John Miller, the fifth son of Matthew Miller, became a Methodist minister at the age of eighteen years, and after creditably serving a number of appointments died in Baltimore in 1877. He was the father of two daughters, who married William Furlong and William Crawford. At the time Robert Stewart came from Ireland he was a single man, and after marrying Margaret Miller he also settled on the ridge. A daughter, Margaret, became the wife of James Burns, of West Virginia; and the sons were John, James, David, William, and Miller. The latter became a physician, and is a resident of Pine Glen; William lives in Centre County; James resides on part of the homestead; and John lived on an adjoining farm until his death in January, 1877, the farm now being occupied by his son Frank.

The Cunningham family came from Tuscarora Valley about 1800, and settled in the northeastern part of Miller. John Cunningham was the father of sons named William, living in the southern part of the county; John, living in the same locality; Richard, married to Sarah Johnston, and living on the place now owned by his son David, while a sister married John Gregory, of Shaver's Creek Valley; Josiah, married to Anna Moore, was for some years a merchant at Huntingdon; and Robinson, married to a Miss McCauley, who were the parents of John Cunningham, of Logan township. The Cunninghams are among the substantial farmers of the county, and rank among its active business men.

On Warrior's Ridge, in what is now Miller, Gilbert Chaney was one of the early settlers. He was the father of sons named James, John, Gilbert, and Shadrach. The latter became a Methodist minister. A daughter became the wife of William Barr, of Jackson township. At the foot of the ridge, on the present Myton farm, Edward Couch made an early settlement. He reared a family which was very active in developing the resources of the township. Of these, William was the father of W. Durbin Couch, of Altoona. Andrew Couch was married to Rebecca Green, a daughter of Elisha Green, and was the father of William Couch, of Miller; George G. Couch, of McVeytown; John C. Couch, of Pittsburgh; Nicholas Couch, of Missouri; and of daughters who married Graffius Miller and Alexander Port.

The Crownover brothers, Thomas, William, and Hezekiah, although not among the earliest of the settlers in Miller, have long been connected with its history. The former reared sons named John, Daniel, Thomas, and William, as well as daughters who married James Coy and Jacob Hummell. The latter had daughters who married, - Sarah, Job Slack; Martha, Robert Askins; and Susan, Rev. W. H. S. Keys. His sons were Andrew Crownover, of Saulsburg; John, of Huntingdon; Ferguson, of Standing Stone Valley, in Miller; Hezekiah, of the same locality; and Robert, of Manor Hill. The sons of William Crownover were Hezekiah, Thomas, and Samuel. Of his daughters, Nancy married Joseph B. Henderson and Robert Green. John Coy, of German descent, after living for some time in Jackson, became a resident of Miller about 1800, and lived on the farm now occupied by his grandson, William, until his death, about 1851. His family consisted of two sons and two daughters, the latter marrying William Couch and Daniel Crownover. The oldest son, James, married Nancy Crownover, and died on the homestead in 1876 at the age of eighty-four years. He was the father of Thomas Coy, who died in 1853; of John Coy, living in Henderson; and of William Coy, living on the homestead.

== Geography ==
The township of Miller was the last organized in the county, its history as a separate body dating only from the spring of 1881. It embraces all that part of the township of Barree lying south and east of the summit of Warrior's Ridge, and extending thence to the summit of Standing Stone Mountain, which is the boundary between Miller and Brady townships and Mifflin County. It thus includes the valley of Standing Stone Creek, and within its bounds is the confluence of the east branch of that stream with the main creek. The course of Standing Stone Creek through the township is quite tortuous, and in many parts the stream has low banks, the contiguous lands being subject to overflow, and thus become somewhat swampy. In the northeastern part and along the Jackson line the banks are high and abrupt, yielding no mill-seats. Farther interior are several powers, which operate country mills.

== Demographics ==
As of the census[1] of 2000, there were 514 people, 199 households, and 153 families residing in the township. The population density was 22.9 people per square mile (8.8/km²). There were 239 housing units at an average density of 10.7/sq mi (4.1/km²). The racial makeup of the township was 99.42% White and 0.58% African American.

There were 199 households out of which 34.2% had children under the age of 18 living with them, 68.8% were married couples living together, 4.5% had a female householder with no husband present, and 23.1% were non-families. 19.1% of all households were made up of individuals and 5.5% had someone living alone who was 65 years of age or older. The average household size was 2.58 and the average family size was 2.95.

In the township the population was spread out with 25.5% under the age of 18, 4.1% from 18 to 24, 31.1% from 25 to 44, 26.1% from 45 to 64, and 13.2% who were 65 years of age or older. The median age was 39 years. For every 100 females there were 98.5 males. For every 100 females age 18 and over, there were 91.5 males.

The median income for a household in the township was $37,283, and the median income for a family was $42,000. Males had a median income of $32,292 versus $30,625 for females. The per capita income for the township was $17,680. About 7.2% of families and 6.8% of the population were below the poverty line, including 3.1% of those under age 18 and 6.3% of those age 65 or over.

== Local lore ==
Legend has it that Matthew Miller used to host parties for George Washington on the second floor of his residence.

== Geography ==
According to the United States Census Bureau, the township has a total area of 22.4 square miles (58.1 km^{2}), all land.

== Demographics ==
Historical population
Census	Pop.	Note	%±
2000	514		—
2010	462		−10.1%
2020	457		−1.1%
2022 (est.)	451		−1.3%
U.S. Decennial Census

As of the census of 2000, there were 514 people, 199 households, and 153 families residing in the township.

The population density was 22.9 people per square mile (8.8/km^{2}). There were 239 housing units at an average density of 10.7/sq mi (4.1/km^{2}).

The racial makeup of the township was 99.42% White and 0.58% African American.

There were 199 households, out of which 34.2% had children under the age of eighteen living with them; 68.8% were married couples living together, 4.5% had a female householder with no husband present, and 23.1% were non-families. 19.1% of all households were made up of individuals, and 5.5% had someone living alone who was sixty-five years of age or older.

The average household size was 2.58 and the average family size was 2.95.

Within the township, the population was spread out, with 25.5% of residents who were under the age of eighteen, 4.1% who were aged eighteen to twenty-four, 31.1% who were aged twenty-five to forty-four, 26.1% who were aged forty-five to sixty-four, and 13.2% who were sixty-five years of age or older. The median age was thirty-nine years.

For every one hundred females, there were 98.5 males. For every one hundred females who were aged eighteen or older, there were 91.5 males.

The median income for a household in the township was $37,283, and the median income for a family was $42,000. Males had a median income of $32,292 compared with that of $30,625 for females.

The per capita income for the township was $17,680.

Approximately 7.2% of families and 6.8% of the population were living below the poverty line, including 3.1% of those were under the age of eighteen and 6.3% of those who were aged sixty-five or older.
