= Union Township, Huntingdon County, Pennsylvania =

Township in Pennsylvania, US

Coordinates: 40°21′00″N 77°57′59″W

- Township
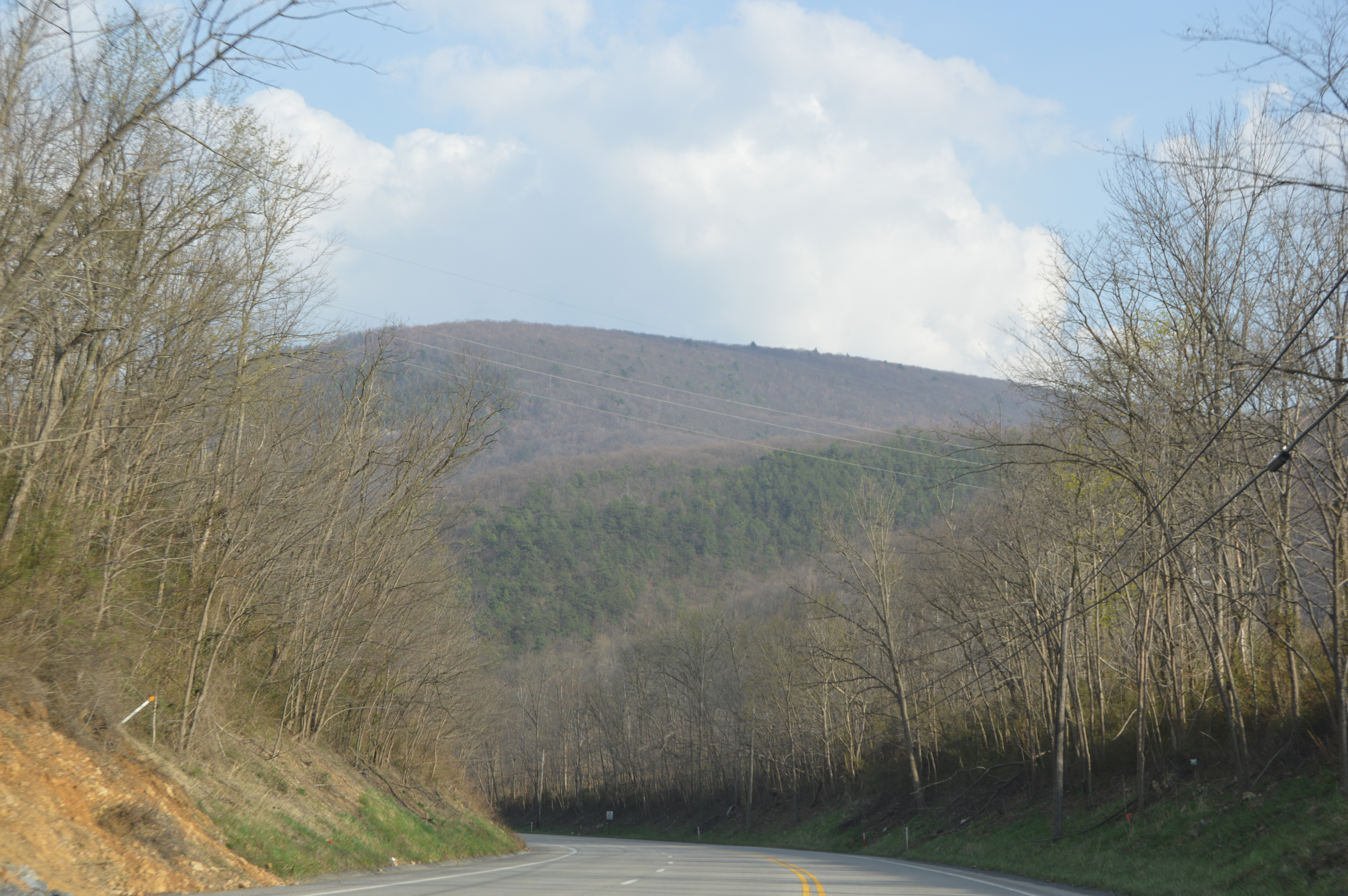
- Jacks Mountain, a major feature of the township's topography, seen from across the Juniata River

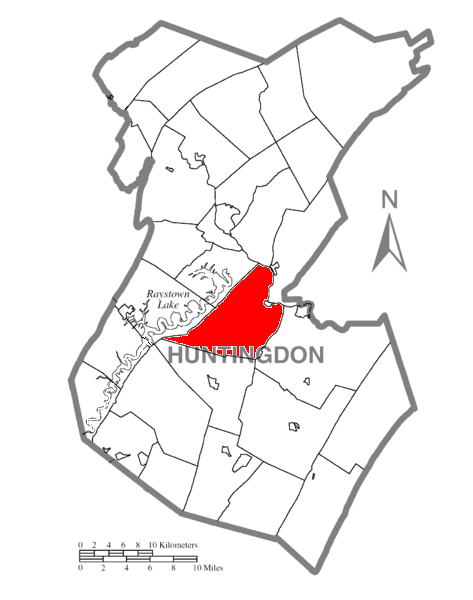
- Map of Huntingdon County, Pennsylvania Highlighting Union Township

- Map of Huntingdon County, Pennsylvania
- Country: United States
- State: Pennsylvania
- County: Huntingdon

Area
  - Total: 39.32 sq mi (101.83 km^{2})
  - Land: 39.17 sq mi (101.44 km^{2})
  - Water: 0.15 sq mi (0.40 km^{2})

Population (2020)
  - Total: 951 ▼
  - Estimate (2022): 936
  - Density: 26.2/sq mi (10.11/km^{2})
- Time zone: UTC-5 (Eastern (EST))
  - Summer (DST): UTC-4 (EDT)
- Zip code: 16622, 17052, 17060
- Area code: 814
- FIPS code: 42-061-78328
- Local phone exchanges: 542, 543, 641, 643, 644

Union Township is a township in Huntingdon County, Pennsylvania, United States. The population was 951 at the 2020 census.

== Geography ==
According to the United States Census Bureau, the township has a total area of 39.4 square miles (102.0 km^{2}), of which 39.2 square miles (101.6 km^{2}) is land and 0.2 square mile (0.4 km^{2}) (0.43%) is water.

== Demographics ==
Historical population
Census	Pop.	Note	%±
2000	1,005		—
2010	1,029		2.4%
2020	951		−7.6%
2022 (est.)	936		−1.6%
U.S. Decennial Census

As of the census of 2000, there were 1,005 people, 398 households, and 306 families residing in the township. The population density was 25.6 people per square mile (9.9/km^{2}). There were 638 housing units at an average density of 16.3/sq mi (6.3/km^{2}). The racial makeup of the township was 98.81% White, 0.20% African American, 0.30% from other races, and 0.70% from two or more races. Hispanic or Latino of any race were 0.50% of the population.

There were 398 households, out of which 29.6% had children under the age of 18 living with them, 67.8% were married couples living together, 4.5% had a female householder with no husband present, and 23.1% were non-families. 20.4% of all households were made up of individuals, and 9.8% had someone living alone who was 65 years of age or older. The average household size was 2.53 and the average family size was 2.88.

In the township the population was spread out, with 22.2% under the age of 18, 6.8% from 18 to 24, 26.8% from 25 to 44, 29.0% from 45 to 64, and 15.3% who were 65 years of age or older. The median age was 41 years. For every 100 females there were 99.4 males. For every 100 females age 18 and over, there were 104.7 males.

The median income for a household in the township was $31,397, and the median income for a family was $35,000. Males had a median income of $27,578 versus $20,769 for females. The per capita income for the township was $14,940. About 10.9% of families and 11.4% of the population were below the poverty line, including 17.0% of those under age 18 and 10.5% of those age 65 or over.
