= Smithfield Township, Huntingdon County, Pennsylvania =

Township in Pennsylvania, US

Coordinates: 40°28′00″N 77°59′44″W

- Township
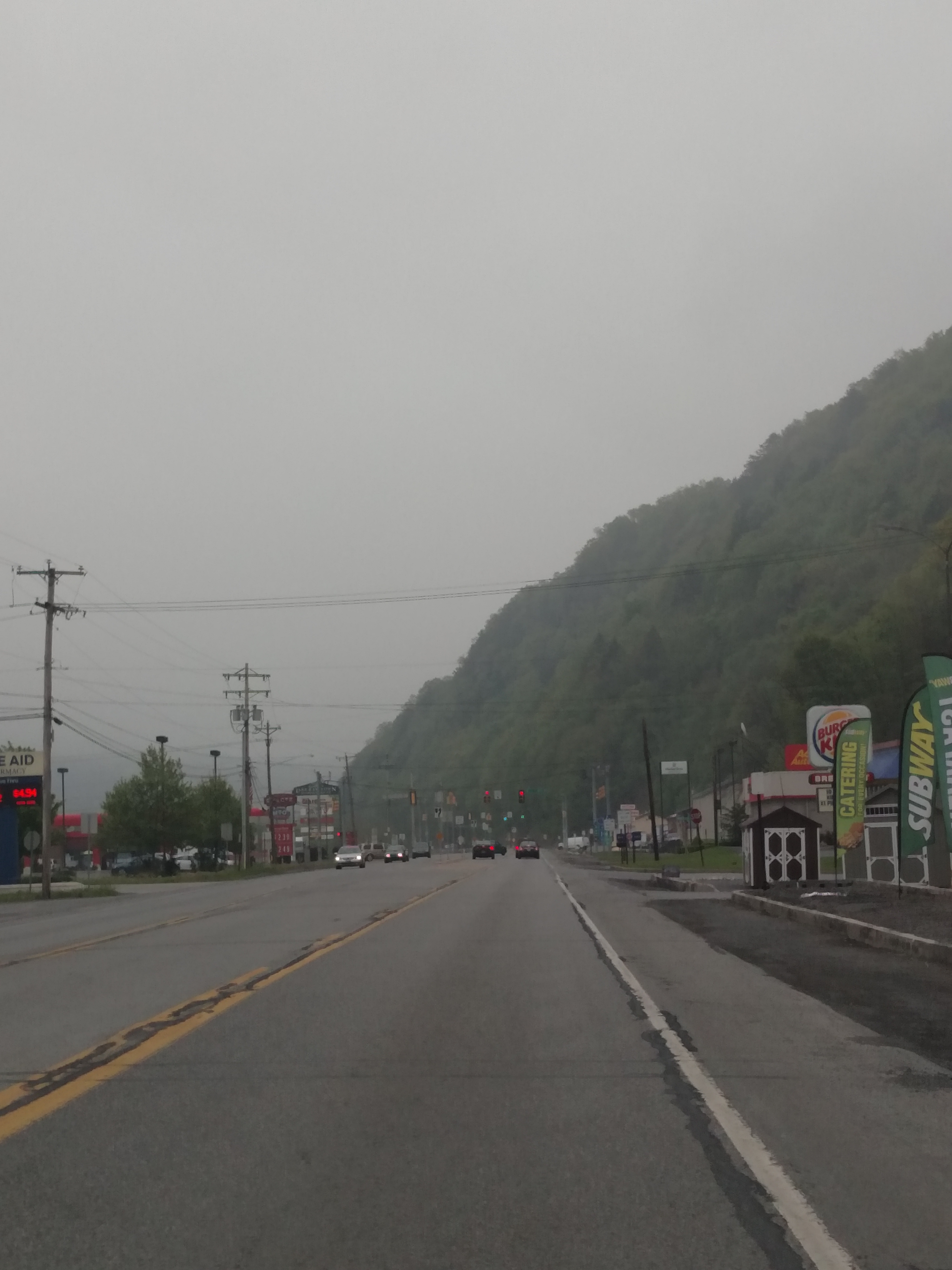
- US 22 in Smithfield Township

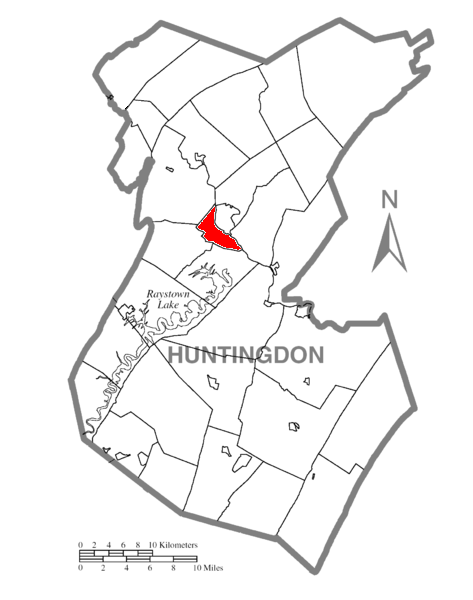
- Map of Huntingdon County, Pennsylvania Highlighting Smithfield Township

- Map of Huntingdon County, Pennsylvania
- Country: United States
- State: Pennsylvania
- County: Huntingdon

Area
  - Total: 5.60 sq mi (14.51 km^{2})
  - Land: 5.50 sq mi (14.25 km^{2})
  - Water: 0.10 sq mi (0.26 km^{2})

Population (2020)
  - Total: 4,619 ▲
  - Density: 840/sq mi (324/km^{2})
- Time zone: UTC-5 (Eastern (EST))
  - Summer (DST): UTC-4 (EDT)
- Zip code: 16652
- Area code: 814
- FIPS code: 42-061-71328
- Website: https://huntingdonsmithfieldpa.gov/
- Local phone exchanges: 506, 641, 643, 644

Smithfield Township is a township that is located in Huntingdon County, Pennsylvania, United States. The population was 4,619 at the time of the 2020 census.

The township includes the village of Smithfield.

== Geography ==
According to the United States Census Bureau, the township has a total area of 5.8 square miles (14.9 km^{2}), of which 5.6 square miles (14.6 km^{2}) is land and 0.1 square miles (0.3 km^{2}) (2.25%) is water.

=== Adjacent municipalities ===
All municipalities are located in Huntingdon County unless otherwise noted.

- Huntingdon borough
- Juniata Township
- Walker Township
- Henderson Township
- Porter Township

== Demographics ==
Historical population
| Census | Pop. | Note | %± |
|---|---|---|---|
| 1990 | 4,181 | | — |
| 2000 | 4,468 | | 6.9% |
| 2010 | 4,382 | | −1.9% |
| 2020 | 4,618 | | 5.4% |
| 2022 (est.) | 4,031 | | −12.7% |
U.S. Decennial Census

As of the census of 2010, there were 4,390 people and 580 occupied households within the township.

The population density was 756.9 inhabitants per square mile (292.2/km^{2}). There were 637 housing units at an average density of 109.8 per square mile (42.4/km^{2}).

The racial makeup of the township was 48.45% White, 43.19% African American, 0.01% Native American, 0.05% Asian, 7.77% from other races, and 1.47% from two or more races. Hispanic or Latino of any race were 8.02% of the population.

There were 580 households, out of which 22.9% had children under the age of 18 living with them, 48.9% were married couples living together, 9.5% had a female householder with no husband present, and 39.1% were non-families. 34.4% of all households were made up of individuals, and 17.8% had someone living alone who was 65 years of age or older. The average household size was 2.21 and the average family size was 2.84.

Within the township, the population was spread out, with 5.1% under the age of 18, .5% from 18 to 19, 7.2% from 20 to 24, 30.4% from 25 to 34, 32.4% from 35 to 49, 17.3% from 50 to 64, and 7.1% who were 65 years of age or older. The median age was 35 years. The population was 85.33% male, and 14.67% female.
