= Huntingdon, Pennsylvania =

Borough in Pennsylvania, US

- Borough
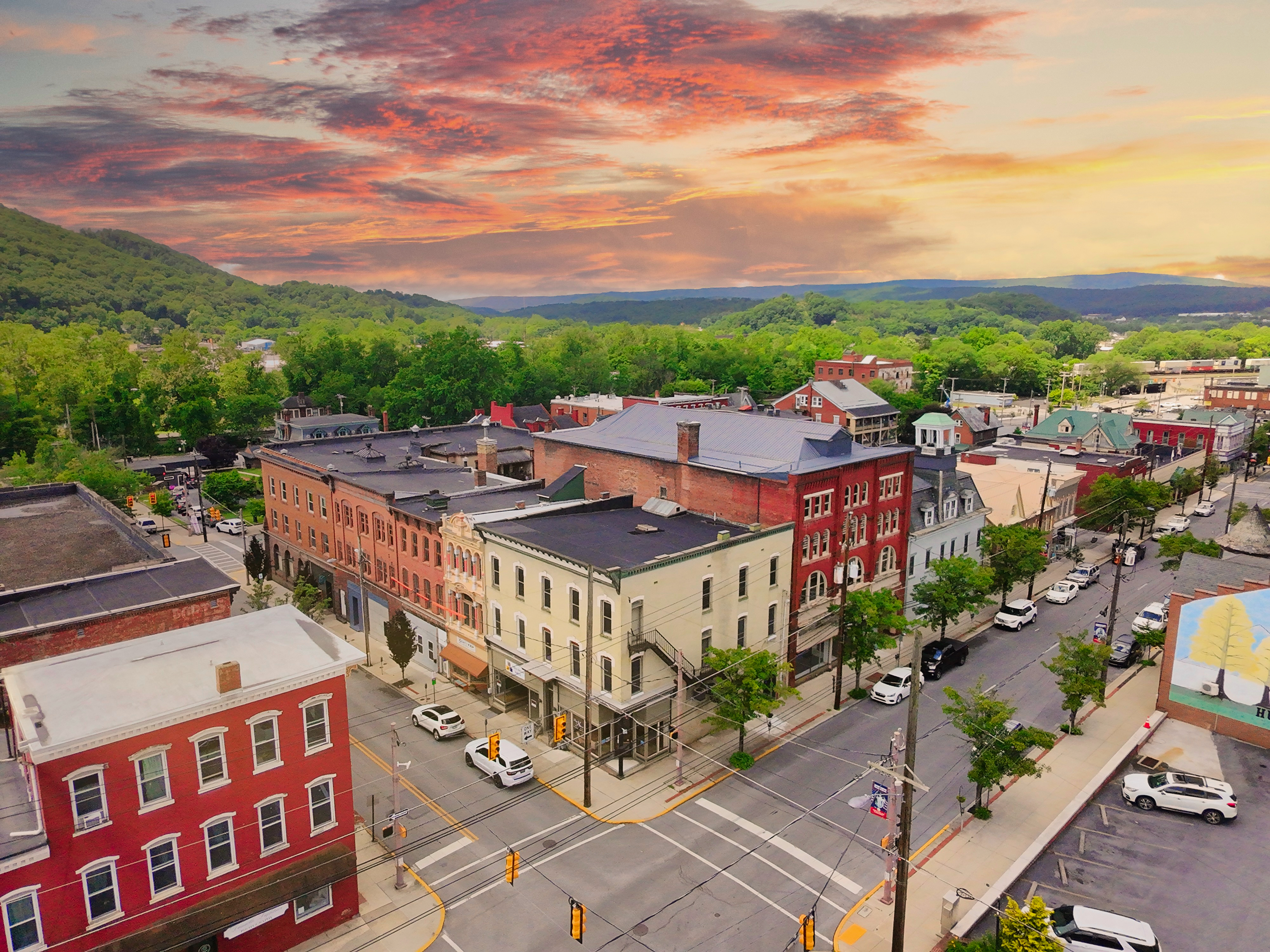
- Aerial of downtown

- Flag Seal
- Motto: "Our Home, Our Town"
- Location of Huntingdon in Huntingdon County, Pennsylvania

- Location within Pennsylvania Location within the United States
- Coordinates: 40°29′50″N 78°00′04″W
- Country: United States
- State: Pennsylvania
- County: Huntingdon
- Plat drawn of streets and lots: 1767
- Incorporated: 1796

Government
  - Type: Borough Council
  - Mayor: Thomas Yoder (R), elected 2021

Area
  - Total: 3.70 sq mi (9.59 km^{2})
  - Land: 3.62 sq mi (9.37 km^{2})
  - Water: 0.085 sq mi (0.22 km^{2})
- Elevation: 751 ft (229 m)

Population (2020)
  - Total: 6,827
  - Density: 1,887/sq mi (728.7/km^{2})
- Time zone: UTC-5 (Eastern (EST))
  - Summer (DST): UTC-4 (EDT)
- ZIP Codes: 16652, 16654
- Area code: 814
- FIPS code: 42-36368
- GNIS feature ID: 1215270
- Website: huntingdonboro.com

Huntingdon is a borough in and county seat of Huntingdon County, Pennsylvania, United States. It lies along the Juniata River about 32 miles (51 km) east of larger Altoona and 92 miles (148 km) west of the state capital of Harrisburg on the Susquehanna River. With a population of 6,827 in the 2020 U.S. Decennial Census, it is the largest population center near Raystown Lake, a winding, 28-mile-long (45 km) flood-control reservoir managed by the United States Army Corps of Engineers.

The borough is on the main line of the Norfolk Southern freight railway (formerly the longtime Pennsylvania Railroad) in an agricultural and outdoor recreational region with extensive forests and scattered deposits of ganister rock, coal, fire clay, and limestone deposits. Historically, the region surrounding Huntingdon was dotted with iron furnaces and forges, consuming limestone, iron ore and wood (for charcoal production) throughout the 19th century. Dairy farms dominate the local agriculture. The town is a regular stop for the daily east-west Amtrak passenger train service which connects Pittsburgh to the west with Philadelphia and New York City to the east and northeast. Huntingdon is also home to Juniata College (founded 1876 by the Church of the Brethren).

== History ==
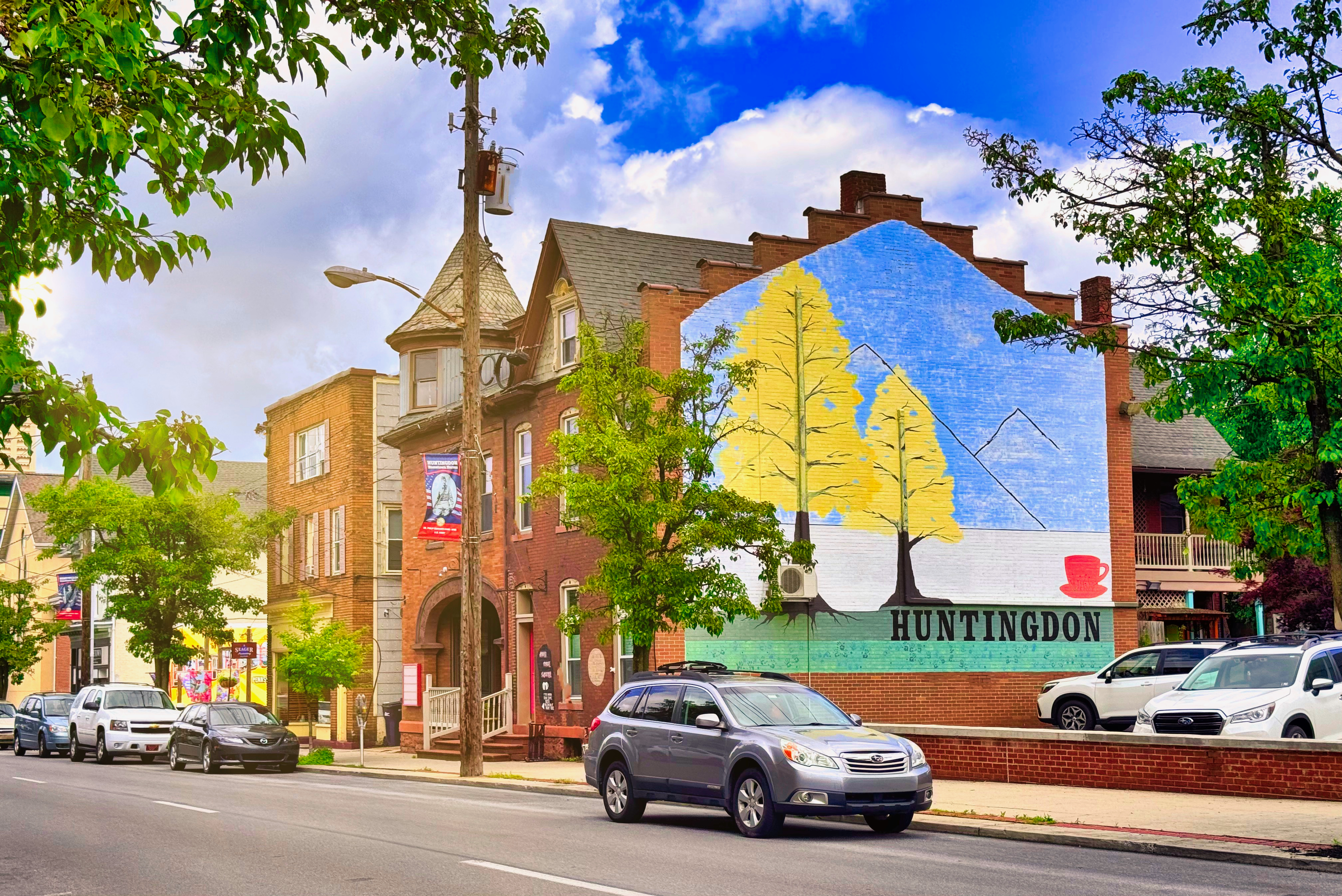
Downtown Huntingdon mural

The original inhabitants of Huntingdon and neighboring counties were the Susquehannock. Through a combination of ongoing war with other indigenous nations, such as the Haudenosaunee, disease brought by Europeans, and violence from settlers, the Susquehannock are currently thought to have been entirely wiped out or subsumed by other tribes.

In 1768, Rev. William Smith began selling lots on the Standing Stone Tract along the Juniata, land he had recently acquired. The tracts' two prior owners had not attempted to lay out a town, so Dr. Smith is considered the founder. Huntingdon (the name by which he eventually called his town) sits at the site of corn fields that had been cultivated at a date now unknown, next to where Standing Stone Creek flows into the Juniata River. The 100th anniversary of its incorporation was marked by the erection of a "Standing Stone Monument" on Third Street, modeled on a tall, narrow shaft known to have existed before 1750, whose purpose is unclear but may have served as a trail marker. It may be significant that natural sandstone formations (popularly called Pulpit Rocks), which "stand erect", are on a nearby ridge. A story surfaced during the early 19th century that Smith had renamed Standing Stone Settlement to honor an Englishwoman, Selina Hastings, Countess of Huntingdon. Smith's descendants vehemently denied the story, and there exists no evidence to support it, despite a wide circulation in published sources. More likely, the Anglican cleric named it after the town of the same name in England; doing so had become a pattern for naming Pennsylvania settlements, Bedford, Carlisle and York being nearby examples of the trend. In 1796, the little village was incorporated as a borough.

Huntingdon long served as the junction of the Huntingdon and Broad Top Mountain Railroad with the Pennsylvania Railroad, and as an important port on the Main Line of Public Works of the Pennsylvania Canal. In past years, Huntingdon boasted of manufacturers of flour, heavy machinery, radiators, furniture, stationery, woolen goods, shirts, shoes, electronic components, finished lumber, fiberglass yarn, matting and underground storage tanks. In the 19th century, J. C. Blair, a native of Shade Gap and a stationer and businessman, popularized the writing tablet and began marketing it nationwide. His factory in downtown Huntingdon was later relocated to nearby Alexandria.

Huntingdon's Herncane Broom Factory was founded in 1863 by Benjamin F. Herncane. The 1897 Commemorative Biographical Encyclopedia of the Juniata Valley reported that the factory's output was twenty-five dozens per day and furnished "all the brooms used by the Pennsylvania Railroad Company." The company employed 14 workers and 3 traveling salesman. The building stood on Fourteenth Street from number 1416 to 1422. On 27 February 1903, the Everett Press reported that the "Herncane Broom Factory of Huntingdon was destroyed by fire last Saturday night. Loss about $1500." Brothers Walter S. and George B. Herncane, who worked with their father at the broom factory, went on to found the Herncane Bros. general store, which stood at the corner of 6th and Washington.

The vicinity (but not much of the town proper) has been the subject of repeated flooding, in 1889, in 1936, and again in 1972. More recently in 2004, Hurricane Ivan resulted in major flooding close to Huntingdon, the worst since the remnants of Hurricane Agnes stalled over the region in July 1972.

The Huntingdon Borough Historic District was listed on the National Register of Historic Places in 1986.

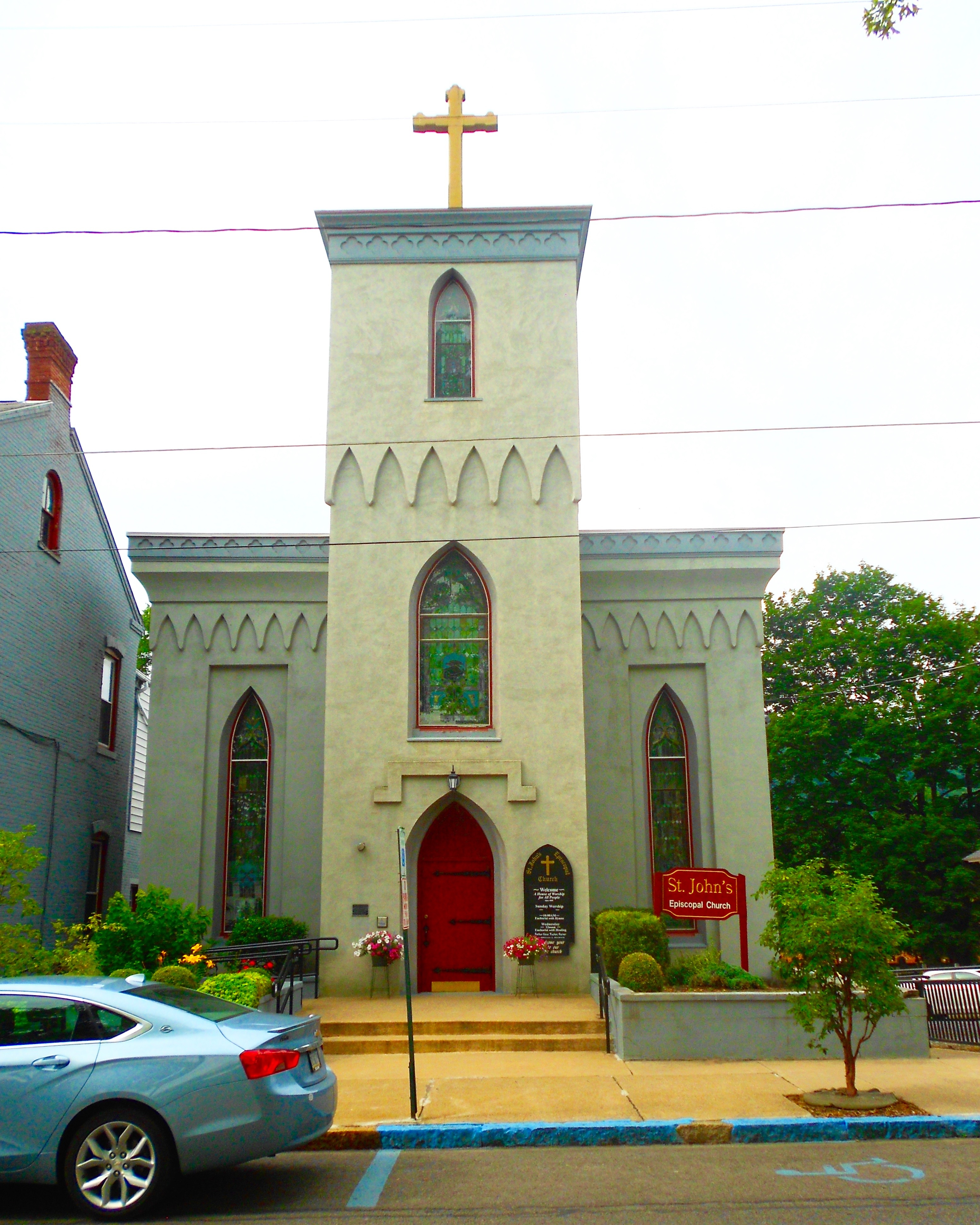
St. Johns Episcopal Church

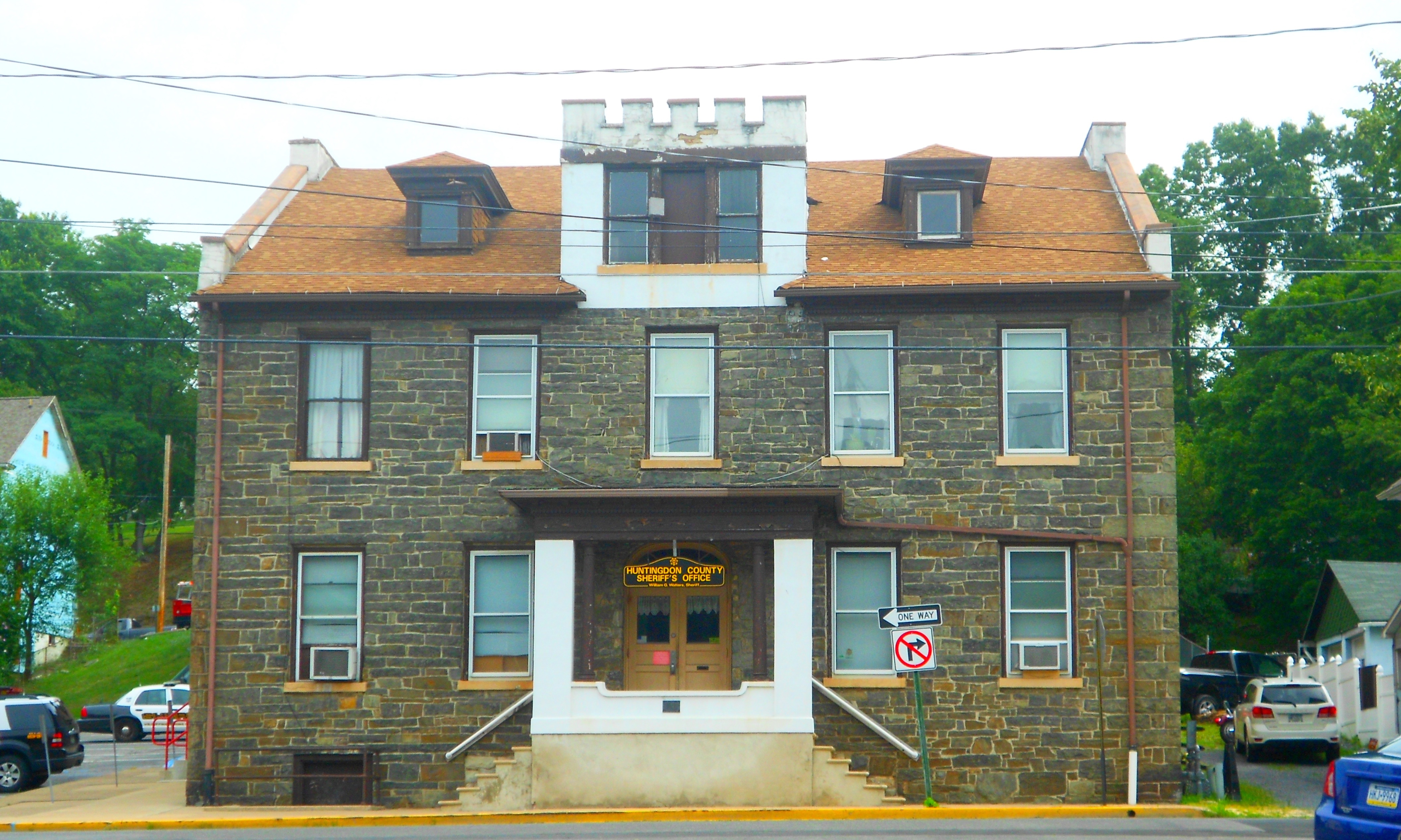
Huntingdon County Sheriff's Office

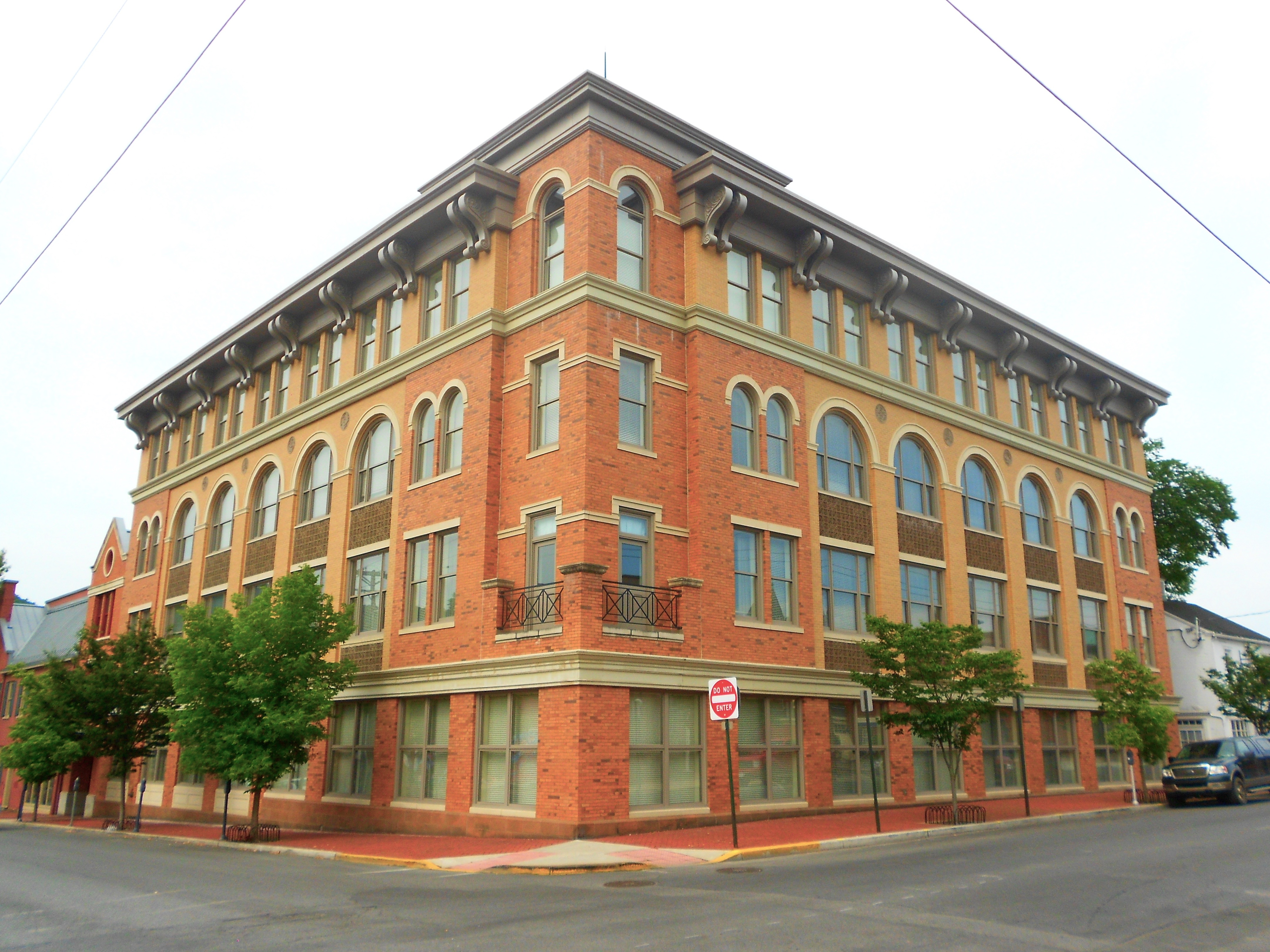
Mutual Benefit Building at 4th and Washington streets

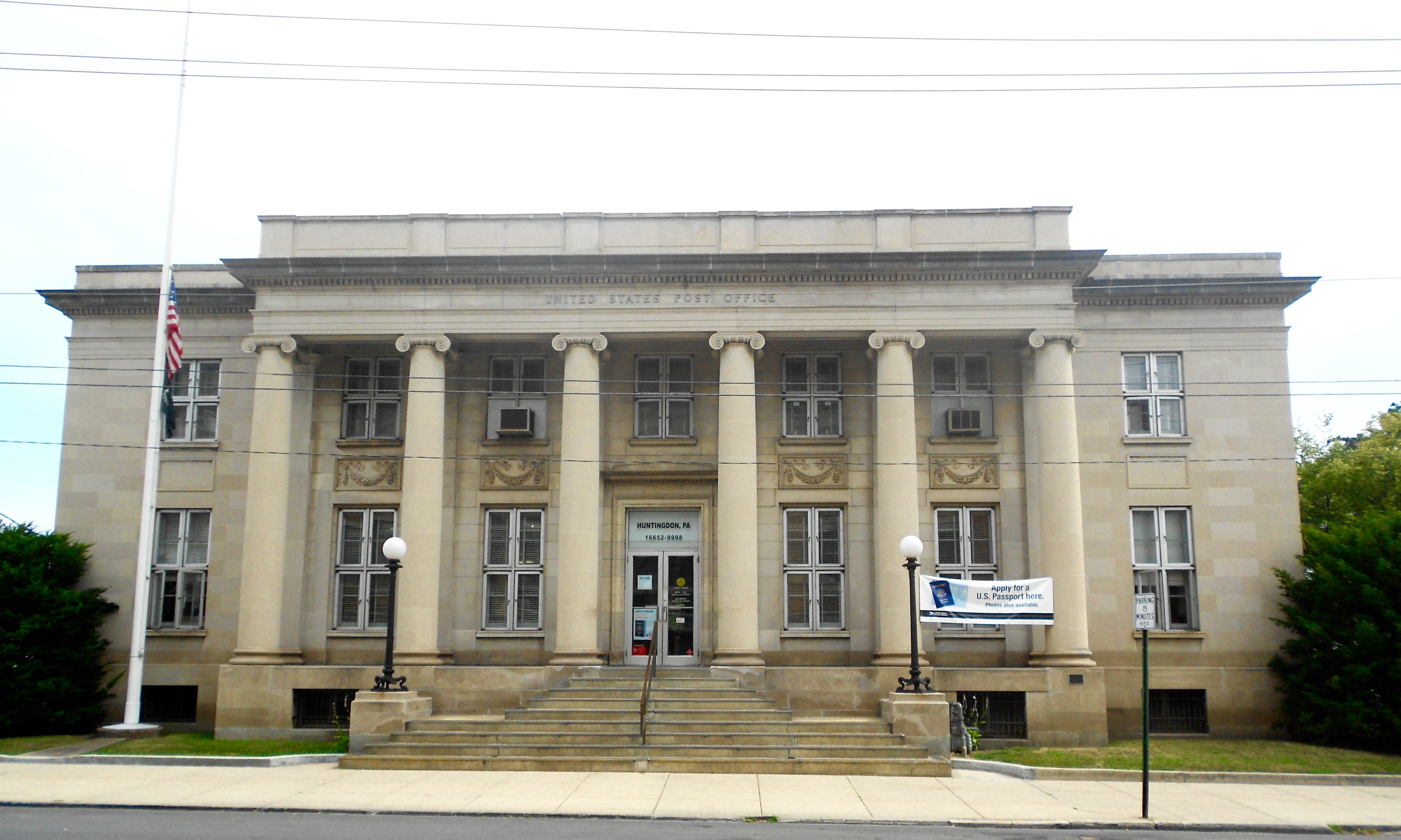
Post office

From June 8 to 11, 2017, Huntingdon celebrated its 250th anniversary.

== Geography ==
Huntingdon is located north of the center of Huntingdon County at 40°29′43″N 78°0′47″W (40.495187, −78.013147), on the northeast side of the Juniata River, an east-flowing major tributary of the Susquehanna River.

According to the United States Census Bureau, the borough has a total area of 3.7 square miles (9.6 km^{2}), of which 3.6 square miles (9.4 km^{2}) are land and 0.1 square miles (0.2 km^{2}), or 2.50%, are water.

=== Adjacent municipalities ===
The following municipalities are also located in Huntingdon County, bordering on the borough:

- Smithfield Township to the south and west, across the Juniata River
- Henderson Township to the east
- Oneida Township to the north and east

=== Climate ===
Huntingdon has a humid continental climate (Köppen Dfa), with warm summers and moderately cold winters.

Climate data for Huntingdon, Pennsylvania
Month	Jan	Feb	Mar	Apr	May	Jun	Jul	Aug	Sep	Oct	Nov	Dec	Year
Record high °F (°C)	79 (26)	77 (25)	85 (29)	95 (35)	98 (37)	100 (38)	105 (41)	105 (41)	102 (39)	97 (36)	79 (26)	73 (23)	105 (41)
Mean daily maximum °F (°C)	38 (3)	39 (4)	50 (10)	62 (17)	74 (23)	82 (28)	85 (29)	83 (28)	78 (26)	66 (19)	52 (11)	40 (4)	62 (17)
Mean daily minimum °F (°C)	19 (−7)	19 (−7)	27 (−3)	36 (2)	46 (8)	55 (13)	59 (15)	58 (14)	51 (11)	39 (4)	31 (−1)	22 (−6)	39 (4)
Record low °F (°C)	−29 (−34)	−23 (−31)	−10 (−23)	6 (−14)	21 (−6)	29 (−2)	42 (6)	36 (2)	24 (−4)	13 (−11)	−10 (−23)	−22 (−30)	−29 (−34)
Average precipitation inches (mm)	2.8 (71)	2.5 (64)	3.5 (89)	3.3 (84)	3.8 (97)	3.9 (99)	3.9 (99)	3.7 (94)	3.0 (76)	2.8 (71)	2.6 (66)	2.7 (69)	38.5 (979)
Source: Weatherbase

== Demographics ==
As of the census of 2010, there were 7,093 people, 2,674 households, and 1,461 families residing in the borough.

Historical population
Year	Pop.	±%
1800	688	—
1810	676	−1.7%
1820	848	+25.4%
1840	1,145	+35.0%
1850	1,470	+28.4%
1860	1,890	+28.6%
1870	3,634	+92.3%
1880	4,125	+13.5%
1890	5,729	+38.9%
1900	6,053	+5.7%
1910	6,861	+13.3%
1920	7,051	+2.8%
1930	7,558	+7.2%
1940	7,170	−5.1%
1950	7,330	+2.2%
1960	7,234	−1.3%
1970	6,987	−3.4%
1980	7,042	+0.8%
1990	6,843	−2.8%
2000	6,918	+1.1%
2010	7,093	+2.5%
2020	6,827	−3.8%
Sources: Source: U.S. Decennial Census

The population density was 2,026.6 inhabitants per square mile (782.5/km^{2}). There were 2,911 housing units at an average density of 831.7 per square mile (321.1/km^{2}). The racial makeup of the borough was 94.61% White, 1.93% Black or African American, 0.07% Native American, 1.51% Asian, 0.31% from other races, and 1.56% from two or more races. Hispanic or Latino of any race were 1.49% of the population.

There were 2,674 households, out of which 26.2% had children under the age of 18 living with them, 38.2% were married couples living together, 4.1% had a male householder with no wife present, 12.4% had a female householder with no husband present, and 45.4% were non-families. 38.3% of all households were made up of individuals, and 15.6% had someone living alone who was 65 years of age or older. The average household size was 2.16 and the average family size was 2.82.

In the borough the population was spread out, with 17.7% under the age of 18, 24.4% from 18 to 24, 19.1% from 25 to 44, 22.4% from 45 to 64, and 16.4% who were 65 years of age or older. The median age was 33 years. For every 100 females, there were 87.5 males. For every 100 females age 18 and over, there were 85.3 males.

The median income for a household in the borough was $35,057, and the median income for a family was $54,621. The per capita income for the borough was $19,070. About 6.3% of families and 15.3% of the population were below the poverty line, including 8.9% of those under age 18 and 14.2% of those age 65 or over.

== Recreation ==
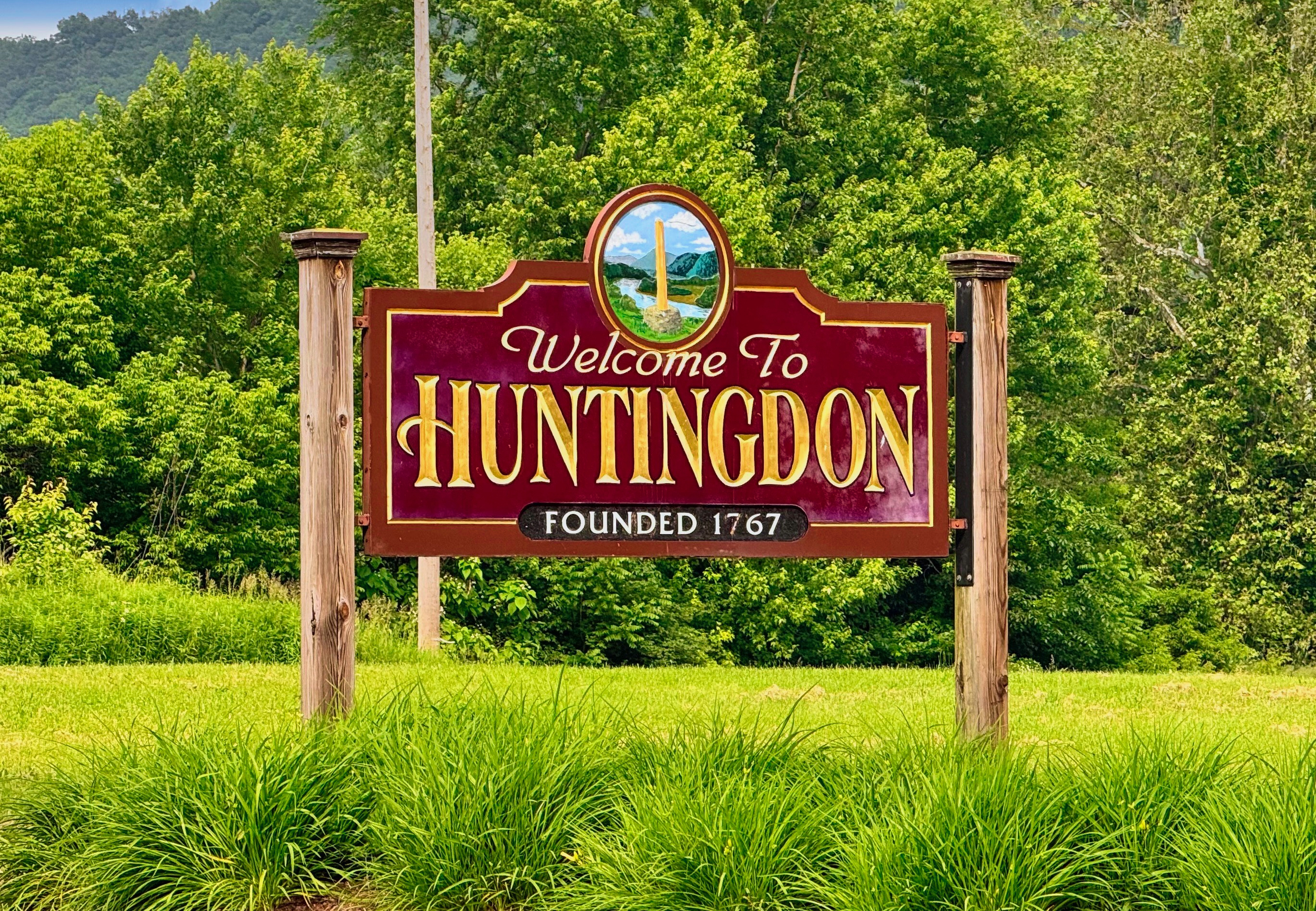
Huntingdon welcome sign

In adjoining Smithfield Township (across the Juniata River) are the regional headquarters of the Pennsylvania Game Commission (Southcentral Division) and the Bureau of Forestry (Rothrock State Forest). State Game Lands 322 extends north from Huntingdon Borough in the direction of Petersburg. Public parks are the George N. Weaver Memorial Park (ball field and playground) at the end of 16th Street, Portstown Park along the Juniata River, and Blair Field bordering Standing Stone Creek. Historic Blair Park, directly across the same stream, is owned and managed by a nonprofit group; it contains a gazebo and a level hiking and biking trail. A vintage chapel within the park is used by the congregation of Epiphany of Our Lord Orthodox Church.

Huntingdon is the nearest town to the Allegrippis Trail system, ranked 15th on the list of "The BEST Mountain Bike Trails in the World."

== Rankings ==
In 2009, Huntingdon was named by Budget Travel magazine's readers as the 5th Coolest Small Town in the United States. Results were announced on The Early Show on April 15, 2009, by Budget Travel's editor in chief Nina Willdorf and show host Harry Smith.

In 2015, Huntingdon was chosen by Niche.com as the 7th Best City to Retire in Pennsylvania.

== Education ==
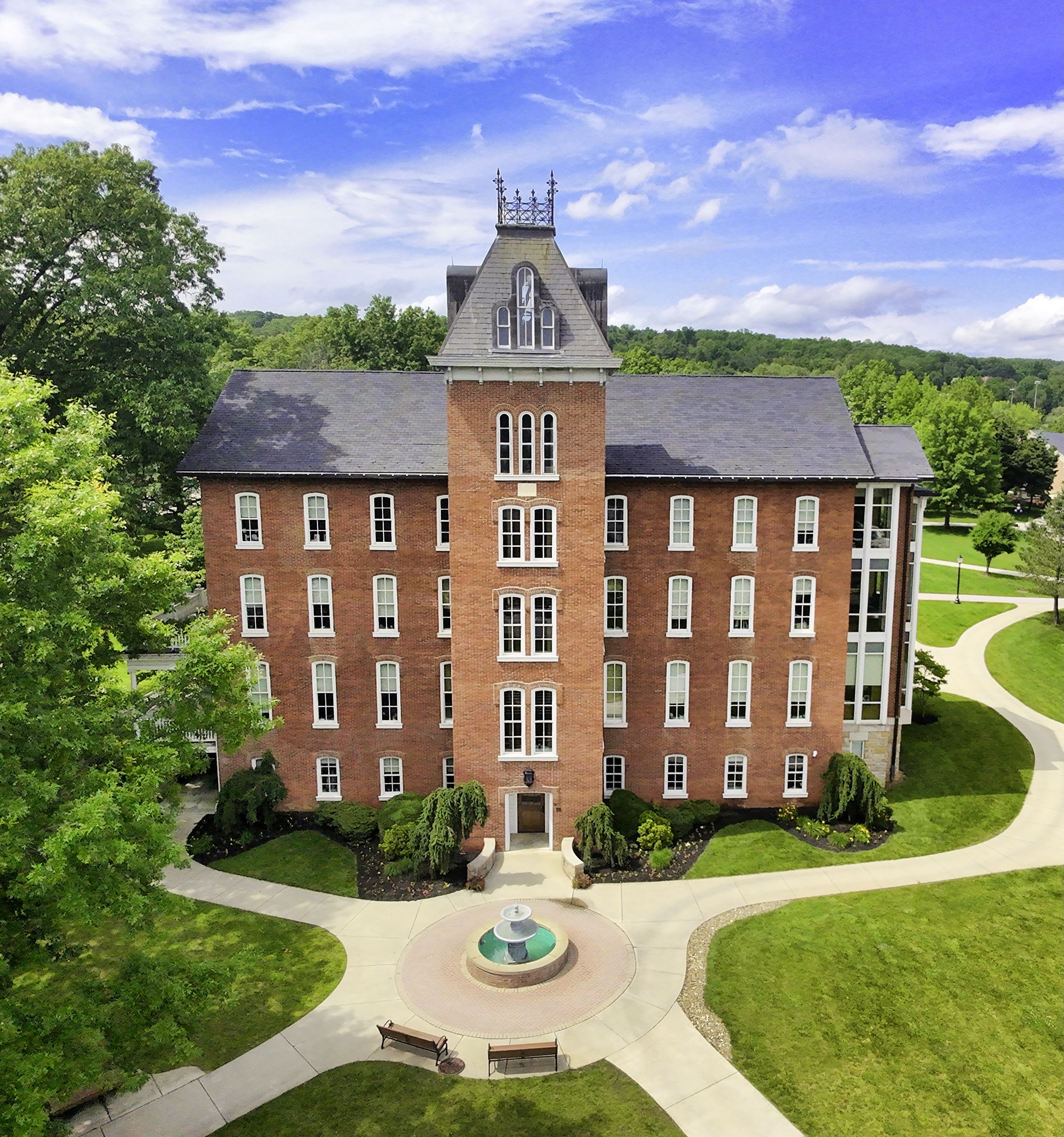
Founders Hall at Juniata College

=== Higher education ===
- Juniata College (1700 Moore Street)

=== Public education ===
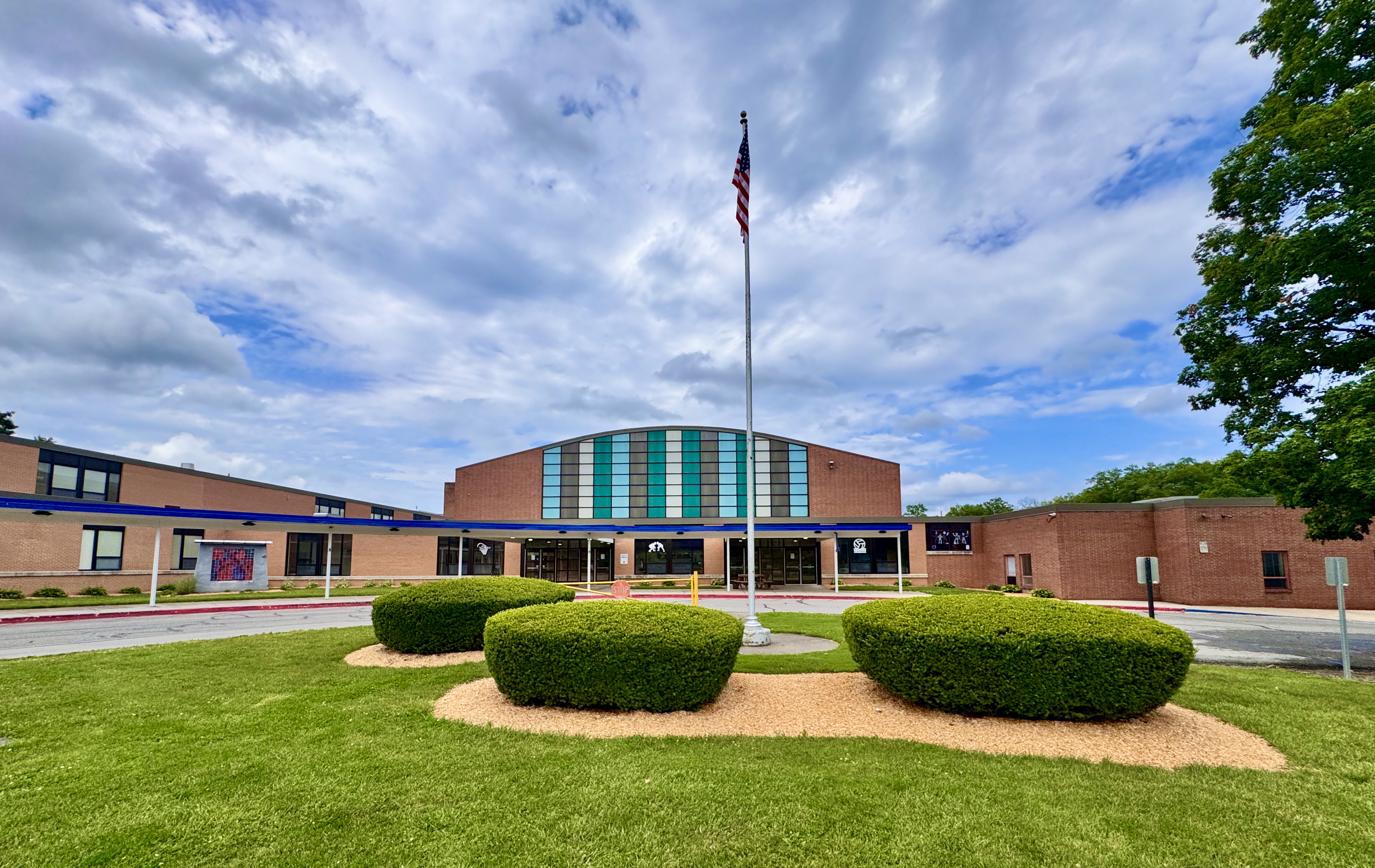
Huntingdon Area Senior High School

- Huntingdon Area Senior High School – opened in 1960 (renovated 2004) – Grades 9–12 (2400 Cassady Avenue)
- Huntingdon Area Middle School – opened in 2012 – Grades 6–8 (2500 Cassady Avenue)
- Southside Elementary School – opened in 1997 – Grades K-5 (10906 Station Road)
- Standing Stone Elementary School – opened in 1999 – Grades K-5 (10 West 29th Street)

=== Private education ===
- Calvary Christian Academy – Grades K-12 (300 Standing Stone Avenue)

== Public services ==
=== Emergency services ===
- Huntingdon Borough Police Department (530 Washington Street)
- Huntingdon Ambulance Services (530 Washington Street)
- Huntingdon County Sheriff's Office (241 Mifflin Street)

=== Health care ===
- Penn Highlands Huntingdon (1225 Warm Springs Avenue)
- J.C. Blair Convenient Care Center (7651 Raystown Shopping Center Drive)
- Huntingdon Health & Wellness Association (HHWA) (313 Fourth Street)
- Huntingdon Health Care, Inc. (814 Washington Street)

=== Postal services ===
- Huntingdon Post Office (401 Washington Street)
- Huntingdon Post Office at Juniata College (1700 Moore Street)

=== Public library ===
- Huntingdon County Library (330 Penn Street)

=== Transportation ===
- Huntingdon station (Amtrak) (Fourth & Allegheny streets)

=== Water source ===
The source of the city water for Huntingdon borough and Smithfield Township is Standing Stone Creek, with the water treatment facility being located in the east end of the borough.

== Media ==
=== Newspapers ===
- The Daily News
- The Valley Log

=== Radio ===
Huntingdon's only radio stations are WHUN WOWY 103.5 FM and Bigfoot Country 106.3 FM. However, radio broadcasts from other markets can also be heard.

=== Television ===
Huntingdon receives all television programming from the Johnstown-Altoona-State College media market.

== Annual events ==
- Mayfest – historically themed festival covering five city blocks in downtown Huntingdon, held annually on last Saturday of April
- Memorial Day parade – held annually on last Monday of May (Memorial Day observed)
- Hauntingdon – compilation of events leading up to Halloween, such as the annual Halloween parade and trick or treat night
- Veterans Day Parade – during the month of November to honor veterans
- Tree Lighting Ceremony – during the first week of December at the 700 block of Washington Street
- Christmas Parade – held on a Saturday night during the month of December
- Cultural District Walking Tours – free tours provided by volunteers during the summer months

== Non-profit organizations ==
- Rotary Club of Huntingdon (10305 Raystown Road)
- Kiwanis Club of Huntingdon (2506 Shadyside Avenue)
- Stone Creek Valley Lions Club (5303 Cold Springs Road)
- The Salvation Army (2514 Shadyside Avenue)
- Huntingdon Food Pantry (5th & Mifflin streets)
- Huntingdon House Domestic Violence Shelter (401 7th Street)
- Huntingdon County Humane Society (11371 School House Hollow Road)

== Notable people ==
- Adaline Hohf Beery (1859–1929), American author, newspaper editor
- Stan Belinda, professional baseball pitcher.
- Jackson Berkey, composer, pianist and singer, with Mannheim Steamroller
- Hugh Brady, military commander
- Christina Crosby, author, professor
- Joseph Dysart, Iowa farmer and politician
- Jean Geissinger, professional baseball player
- Chuck Knox, football coach with NFL's Buffalo Bills, Seattle Seahawks and Los Angeles Rams
- Dylan Lane, game show host
- Samuel W. Miller (1857–1940), US Army brigadier general
- Michael Norell screenwriter, actor, and executive producer
- Horace Porter, Civil War general and US diplomat
- Chris Raschka, children's books artist and author
- Joseph Saxton (1799–1873), inventor, watchmaker, machinist
- Richard Murray Simpson, U.S. congressman
- William Rudolph Smith (1787–1868), Pennsylvania State Representative and Senator
- Robert Elliott Speer, religious leader
- William Andrew Wallace (1827–1892), state and U.S. Senator
- George Benjamin Wittick, photographer (1845–1903)
- Curtis Wright, country songwriter and former member of Shenandoah
- Samuel Zimmerman, businessman, founder of Niagara Falls, Ontario

== See also ==
- Huntingdon (disambiguation)
- Huntingdon Area School District
