= Bethel United Methodist Church =

Bethel United Methodist Church may refer to:

- Bethel United Methodist Church (Bethel, Connecticut)
- Bethel United Methodist Church (Lake City, Florida)
- Bethel United Methodist Church (Bethel Acres, Oklahoma)
