= Clarine Coffin Grenfell =

American poet (1910–2004)

- Born: Clarine Mildred Coffin; December 31, 1910; Bangor, Maine
- Died: September 7, 2004 (aged 93); Bangor, Maine
- Resting place: Mount Hope Cemetery
- Education: University of Maine, Orono; Hartford Theological Seminary
- Known for: Poems, short stories, and teaching
- Spouse: Rev. Jack Grenfell
- Children: Rev. Dr. John Millard Grenfell, Rev. Lornagrace Grenfell, Pamela Grenfell Smith
- Parent(s): Clara Kelley Coffin; Millard Fillmore Coffin

Clarine Coffin Grenfell (December 31, 1910 – September 7, 2004) was an American poet, writer, and teacher.

Milkweed in Fall

Will God, Who hides inside each pod
Seeds for a hundred springs,
Neglect to send, when my fall comes,
The necessary wings?

— From The Caress and the Hurt (1982)

== Education ==
Grenfell graduated from University of Maine in Orono, in 1932, where she was the Class Poet for 1932 and also became a member of the Phi Mu Sorority. She graduated from the Hartford Theological Seminary on May 28, 1938, with a Bachelor of Divinity.

Grenfell was an active member of the Alumni Association of the University of Maine and wrote the Golden Bears column for Maine Alumni Magazine from 1996 to 2002. In 2002, the University of Maine awarded her an honorary Doctor of Humane Letters.

== Teaching ==
Grenfell's teaching career began at the age of 17 in Hermon, Maine. She later taught at many other schools in Bangor, Maine, and Bethel, Woodbury, Bloomfield, West Hartford, and Westport, Connecticut. She chaired the English Department at schools including Hall High School in West Hartford, Connecticut.

Grenfell retired from teaching English in 1980, but continued to teach in other capacities, such as teaching a class called "Writing a Life Story – Yours and Mine" at more than sixty Elderhostels.

== Ministry ==
Grenfell was an active church member, supply pastor, and licensed local preacher in the United Methodist Church. She preached when young in the churches in Dixmont and Hermon, Maine, and in later years conducted many weddings and funerals, taught in Christian education programs, and wrote and directed church plays and pageants. She was the coordinator of Steeple People, a campaign to restore the steeple of the Orland United Methodist Church. Additional materials about Dr. Grenfell are available through the United Methodist Archives Center at Drew University.

== Writing and editing ==
I put down the phone. My arm ached. My ear ached. And there was another kind of dull ache somewhere inside. Marian Anderson's wedding was over. Rev put his hand on my shoulder.

"Good job, darling. Did you keep her talking all this time?"

"Had to . . . she's weeding her front borders this afternoon, right alongside the road. They'd have honeymooned with every reporter on The Bridgeport Post if I'd ever hung up. How was it?"

"The way she wanted it, I think—simple, and sincere, and sacred . . ."

—From The 'Inside' Story

Grenfell worked as an editor and reading consultant for the Educational Division of Reader's Digest and as a reading consultant for the state of Connecticut. After retiring from teaching in 1980, Grenfell founded a small publishing house, the Grenfell Reading Center, publishing books by Maine authors, inspirational books, and her own memoirs and poetry. Several of the poems in her books had already been printed in other publications, including the Bangor Daily News and the Hartford Courant. Grenfell traveled extensively throughout the US, giving lectures and reading from her works. She was one of the founders of the Maine Christian Writers Conference.

=== The 'Inside' Story ===
Grenfell's most famous short story concerns the wedding of Marian Anderson in July 1943. The wedding was a private ceremony performed by Grenfell's husband, the Reverend Jack Grenfell, who was at that time the pastor of the Bethel United Methodist Church in Bethel, Connecticut. Miss Anderson wanted her wedding to be kept private, and so Rev. Grenfell originally arranged to conduct the ceremony in the parsonage instead of the church. At the last minute, however, the location of the ceremony was changed to the Elmwood Chapel on the site of the Elmwood Cemetery.

"The 'Inside' Story" is a comedic behind-the-scenes account of events surrounding the wedding from the perspective of the minister's wife. The story relates young Clarine's frantic attempts to decorate the living room of the parsonage for Anderson's wedding ceremony and her efforts to fend off reporters during and after the ceremony in order to protect Miss Anderson's privacy. The story was published in Grenfell's second book, "Women My Husband Married". It became so popular with readers that later editions of the book included the subtitle "including Marian Anderson."

== Grenfell Poetry Prize ==
In 1990, Grenfell celebrated her 80th birthday by establishing the Grenfell Poetry Prize to recognize outstanding student poets at the University of Maine. Past judges include Annie Finch and Leonore Hildebrandt.

Set Out the Cups

When I get home, I thought, I'll make the tea.
I'll put the kettle on, set out the cups --
Yours white, mine blue -- and then we'll sit and talk
About the service . . .
How the people sang
The 'Alleluias' in your favorite hymn!
How blue the heather was -- almost as blue
As that you picked in Cornwall long ago
And tucked into my hair! And how our son,
So like you, made them laugh (Imagine that!)
With loving stories of his dad, and how
The gentle scent of roses followed us
As we filed out to stand among the stones . . .

When I get home, when I get home, I thought,
I'll make the tea, we'll sit for hours and chat.
I'll put the kettle on, set out the cups --
Set out the cups . . .
no, put the white one back.

— From The Caress and the Hurt (1982)

== Personal life ==
Clarine Coffin was born in Bangor, Maine, to Millard Fillmore Coffin and Clara B. Kelley Coffin. One of six children, she lived in Bangor throughout her childhood and college years. She moved to Connecticut to attend Hartford Theological Seminary, where she met her future husband, the Rev. Jack Grenfell. Jack Grenfell, the son of Rev. Thomas and Ethel (Rowe) Grenfell, was born in St. Just, Cornwall, but moved with his family to the United States in 1912 as a young boy.

Clarine Coffin and Jack Grenfell announced their engagement in 1937. At that time, Clarine was serving the Methodist Church in Dixmont, Maine, and Jack was serving the Trinity Methodist Church in Bridgeport, Connecticut. They were married on June 28, 1938, by the groom's father, Rev. Thomas Grenfell. They had three children: the Rev. Dr. John Millard Grenfell, the Rev. Lornagrace Thomas Grenfell, and Pamela Grenfell Smith.

Rev. Jack Grenfell died on July 2, 1980, in Orland, Maine. Clarine never remarried, remaining a widow for more than 24 years until her death in Bangor, Maine, on September 7, 2004, at age 93. Clarine and Jack Grenfell are both buried in Mount Hope Cemetery in Bangor.

== Honors ==
- Phi Beta Kappa
- Grenfell was made a member of the Augusta Evans Wilson Literary Society, which was established to recognize members of Phi Mu who are published authors of books with an assigned ISBN.
- Grenfell was awarded a Doctorate in Humane Letters by the University of Maine in 2002 at the age of 91. At that time, her health had declined and she was therefore unable to travel to Orono for the commencement ceremony, so University of Maine President Peter S. Hoff made a rare exception to the university policy against conferring honorary degrees in absentia and traveled to Orland to confer the degree on Grenfell in a special hooding ceremony.

== Bibliography ==
- The Caress and the Hurt. Grenfell Reading Center. 1982. ISBN 9780961276607.
- Women My Husband Married. Grenfell Reading Center. 1983.
- Roses in December. Grenfell Reading Center. 1984. ISBN 9780961276614.
- A Backward Look. Grenfell Reading Center. 1985. ISBN 9780961276638.
- Teacher's Guide for RD Leaflets. Reader's Digest Services. 1972.
