= Georgia Ann Laster =

American singer (1927–1961)

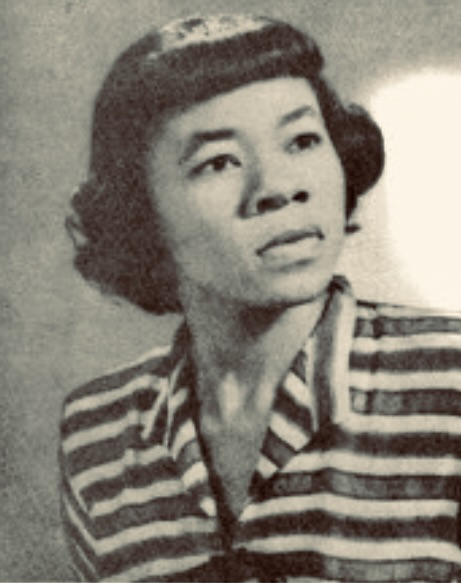

Background information
- Born: November 18, 1927; Little Rock, Arkansas
- Died: September 4, 1961 (aged 33) Lodi, California
- Instrument: Vocals

Georgia Ann Laster (November 18, 1927 – September 4, 1961) was an American soprano.

== Early life and education ==
Laster was born in Little Rock, Arkansas. She had five brothers. She sang in church choirs as a young girl. She attended Dunbar High School and joined her high school's a cappella choir, often appearing as a soloist. She graduated from Junior College of Little Rock. In 1945, Laster began attending the University of Southern California (USC). In November, she began voice lessons at USC and was a member of the choir there, which was directed by Charles Hirt. Laster graduated from the USC's school of music in 1948.

== Career ==
Laster was a protégé of Marian Anderson.

She won an Atwater Kent audition in 1948 and her performance in a related concert received a positive review. After winning a UCLA Young Artist Award, she participated in the final concert in the 1950–1951 season of UCLA's concert series.

She received a scholarship to the Music Academy of the West.

A review of her performance at Philharmonic Auditorium reads, "Miss Laster disclosed a voice of pure quality, adequately powerful in the higher registers if not in the medium and lower ones".

In 1953 she became one of the laureates of the International Naumburg Competition. In 1955–1956 she toured in Europe. The 1956 Laster concerts, in which the music of another African-American musician, William Grant Still, received approving criticism.

Laster was accompanied by Franz Rupp in a recital at Town Hall in New York on March 6, 1955. She sang works by German, French, and English composers; she also sang spirituals. The review notes her "high voice of agreeable texture. She also has sensitivity and musicianship [...] What she lacks is a secure vocal technique." The review also noted that, despite her youth, she was "singing with the voice of an artist beyond her prime".

She was awarded a Fulbright scholarship in 1956. In 1953, she appeared in concert at the Hollywood Bowl. She also performed at Redlands Bowl and Pasadena Playhouse. She received the Marian Anderson Award in 1951, selected from 203 applicants.

Laster was a music teacher at Brooklyn College in New York City and taught in city schools in Los Angeles.

== Death and legacy ==
She died in a car accident with her mother in Lodi, California. Four other people were injured in the accident, including one other person in the car with the Lasters.

In honor of Laster, the Los Angeles branch of the National Association of Negro Musicians is named.

Laster was one of the artists discussed by Anthony Philpott at the Century of Story and Song exhibit at Times Square in May 2020.
