= Central State University =

Historically black university in Wilberforce, Ohio, US

Coordinates: 39°42′55″N 83°52′41″W

- Former names: Wilberforce State College (1887–1951); Central State College (1951–1965)
- Type: Public land-grant historically black university
- Established: 1887; 139 years ago
- Parent institution: University System of Ohio
- Academic affiliations: Space-grant
- President: Morakinyo A.O. Kuti (February 2024-present)
- Students: 2,708 (fall 2024)
- Location: Xenia, Ohio, U.S.
- Campus: Rural
- Colors: Maroon & gold
- Nickname: Marauders and Lady Marauders
- Sporting affiliations: NCAA Division II — SIAC
- Mascot: Marauder Man
- Website: centralstate.edu

Central State University (CSU) is a public, historically black land-grant university formerly located in Wilberforce, Ohio, United States. In September 2026, the university was formally annexed into the neighboring city of Xenia, Ohio. Founded in 1887, it enrolls approximately 2,700 students across its five constituent colleges. It is a member-school of the Thurgood Marshall College Fund, the University System of Ohio, and the Strategic Ohio Council for Higher Education (SOCHE).

Established by the state legislature as a two-year program for teacher and industrial training, CSU was originally part of the four-year private Wilberforce University. It was known as the Combined Normal and Industrial Department. The college gained a four-year curriculum in 1941, independent status in 1947, and was renamed as Central State College in 1951. With further development, it gained university status in 1965. In 2014, Central State University received designation as a land-grant university.

== History ==
Central State University started in 1887 as a two-year normal and industrial department funded by the state. It was first located at Wilberforce University, a historically black college in southern Ohio that was owned and operated by the African Methodist Episcopal Church. In 1941, its curriculum was expanded to a four-year program emphasizing teacher education. In 1947, it was separated from the university, and in 1951 renamed as Central State College. In 1965, with further development, it achieved university status.

Wilberforce University had been founded in 1855 jointly by the Cincinnati Conference of the Methodist Episcopal Church in collaboration with the AME Church; they had a biracial group of trustees to manage it, including founders Bishop Daniel A. Payne and Salmon Chase, then governor of Ohio. By 1860 the college, based on a classical education, had 200 students, mostly the mixed-race children of wealthy Southern planters. With the advance of the Civil War, most of the southerners were pulled out of the school, and it was forced to close in 1862. The Methodist Church felt it could not support it financially given the demands of the war.

The African Methodist Episcopal (AME) Church purchased the facility and reopened the college in 1863, the first to be owned and operated by African Americans.

In 1887, the Ohio General Assembly enacted legislation to create the Combined Normal and Industrial Department at Wilberforce, to provide training for primary teachers in a model common in the United States, and vocational education. This department operated as part of Wilberforce University, but a separately appointed board of trustees governed the state-financed operations. This arrangement allowed state legislators to sponsor scholarship students at the university and brought other forms of useful state financial aid to the school. The administration struggled to maintain its initial emphasis on classical education as well, and allowed students to take classes in both sections.

In 1941 the Normal and Industrial Department expanded from a two-year to a four-year program. In 1947, it was legally split from Wilberforce University and was renamed as the College of Education and Industrial Arts at Wilberforce, Ohio. In 1951, it was renamed Central State College. With further development, in 1965 the institution achieved university status.

In 1974, half the campus was destroyed by a severe tornado.

== Academics ==
Central State University is accredited by the Ohio Department of Education, the North Central Association of Colleges and Schools, the Accreditation Board for Engineering and Technology, the National Association of Schools of Art and Design, Accreditation Council for Business Schools and Programs and the National Association of Schools of Music.

For the 2023-24 school year, the estimated annual cost of all fees and in-state tuition at Central State University was about $4,700, while for out of state students the estimated cost was about $5,700. The college has on-campus housing for about 1,700 students, at approximately $6,000 annually.

=== Colleges ===
Central State operates five colleges: the John W. Garland College of Engineering, Science, Technology and Agriculture, College of Education, College of Humanities Arts and Social Sciences, College of Business, and Honors College.

== Campus ==
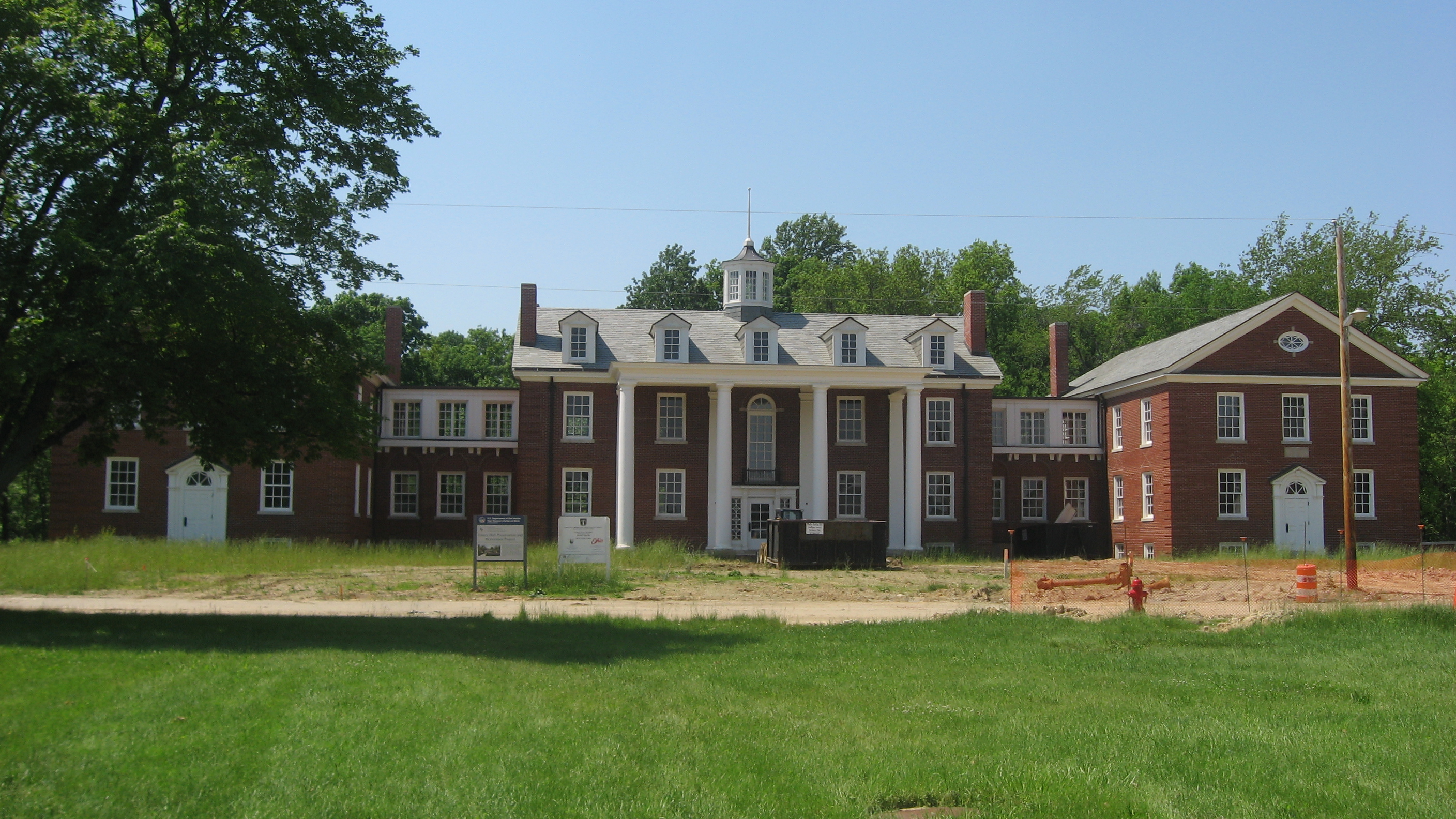
Emery Hall

The main campus is located in Wilberforce, 4 miles (6.4 km) northeast of Xenia, 18 miles (29 km) east of Dayton and midway between Cincinnati and Columbus, Ohio (about 55 miles (89 km) from each city). A branch campus (CSU-Dayton) is located in Dayton.

Adjacent to the main campus is an outdoor education area, a natural reserve. Within a hundred yards of the Robeson Center is the National Afro-American Museum and Cultural Center, operated by the Ohio Historical Society.

Student housing

The campus housing complex, which houses approximately 1,700 students, consists of eight residence halls: Hunter Hall (co-ed), Williamson Hall (co-ed), Green Hall (upperclassmen male), Anderson Hall (upperclassmen male), Fox Hall (co-ed honors), Harry-Johns Hall (co-ed honors), Foundation Hall (freshmen females), Foundation Hall II (co-ed upperclassmen) and most recently added fall 2019, the Marauder Pride Community, an apartment style complex (co-ed upperclassmen), which also houses a 10,000-square-foot Wellness Center.

Benjamin Banneker Science Hall and the University Student Center

Banneker Hall was originally constructed in 1950 with an addition completed in 1967, Banneker Hall housed science laboratories and a botanical laboratory and greenhouse. The building was demolished in fall 2010 to make way for the University Student Center, a 85,000-square-foot complex housing a 500-seat cafeteria, two ballrooms, bookstore, computer lab, administrative offices and recreational spaces, which opened in the fall of 2015.

Beacom/Lewis Gymnasium

Constructed in 1961, Beacom Gymnasium is the home of the Marauders volleyball and basketball teams and provides office space for the Department of Health, Physical Education and Recreation. The original Beacom Gymnasium constructed in 1919 was destroyed by fire in 1971. The natatorium was constructed in 1966.

Hallie Q. Brown Library/Clara A. Henderson Hall College of Education

The Library/College of Education building was completed in 1985 and houses the main library, classrooms, and offices for the College of Education. The library portion of the building is named in honor of long-time educator and public speaker Hallie Q. Brown. The College of Education is named for teacher, department chairperson and dean, Dr. Clara A. Henderson. In 2019, the library was updated with new technology and remodeled to support various forms of collaborative study.

CSU Mass Communication Center

CSU Mass Communication Center, formerly The Cosby Center houses the university's telecommunications programs (including radio, television and print journalism) and the campus-based radio station WCSU-FM. It was constructed in 1958 and named the Lucinda Cook Laboratory Demonstration School.

Galloway/Alumni Tower The Galloway Tower/Walter G. Sellers Alumni

The facility houses the offices of the CSU General Alumni Association. The building was named in honor of Dr. William Galloway, a physician who served as a member of the Board of Trustees of the Combined Normal and Industrial Department. It was rebuilt following the 1974 tornado that destroyed the original Galloway Hall. Funds to reconstruct the tower were raised by alumni and friends of Central State University. During the university's centennial celebration in 1987, the Alumni Center was named in honor of Walter G. Sellers Sr., a 1951 CSU graduate.

Jenkins Technology Education Building

Home of the Department of Manufacturing and Industrial Engineering, the building is named in honor of Carl C. Jenkins, a superintendent of the Combined Normal and Industrial Department. An earlier building, constructed in 1941, was also named for Jenkins and housed the Physical Education Department, Army ROTC, and Bookstore and Grill. Destroyed in 1974, the original Jenkins Hall housed the audio-visual department, the campus radio station, the bookstore, and office of the CSU Federal Credit Union at the time.

The C.J. McLin International Center for Water Resources Management

Three programs are housed in the facility opened in 1987: Water Resources Management, Geology, and Earth Sciences.

Lackey/Lee Health Center The Lackey/Lee Health Center

Opened in 1978, the center houses administrative offices, examination and treatment rooms, and laboratory facilities. It replaced the former campus health center, also named for Dr. Lackey and earlier known as Tawawa Hospital, which was among the buildings destroyed in 1974. The building is named for Dr. Harry M. Lackey (university physician from 1921 to 1953), Bishop Benjamin F. Lee (president of Wilberforce University from 1876 to 1884), Benjamin F. Lee Jr. (a faculty member), and Benjamin F. Lee III (physician who served the campus and the community).

McPherson Memorial Stadium

McPherson Stadium is home to the Marauder football and track and field teams. Originally constructed in 1949, the structure has been renovated to expand and modernize the locker room, training room, and office spaces. It is named in honor of Combined Normal and Industrial Department graduate William Patrick McPherson, who was killed in action in World War II.

Lionel H. Newsom Administration Building

The administration building was dedicated in 1978 and named in honor of Dr. Lionel H. Newsom, president of Central State from 1972 to 1985. It was constructed on the remaining portion of the Hallie Q. Brown Memorial Library, heavily damaged in the 1974 tornado. The building houses administrative and financial offices, the administrative computer center, and the Office of the Registrar.

Paul Robeson Cultural and Performing Arts Center

The Paul Robeson Cultural and Performing Arts Center houses the art and music departments, classrooms, and studios. It was dedicated in 1978 in honor of the singer, actor, activist and winner of the Stalin Peace Prize, Paul Robeson. The building includes an 850-seat auditorium and a recital hall. A large sculpture of Robeson in front of the center was commissioned by Camille and William Cosby.

Charles S. Smith College of Business

Smith Hall was completed in 1970 and named in honor of Charles S. Smith, founder of the College of Business Administration. It houses the College of Business Administration's classrooms and laboratories and an academic computer center.

Norman E. Ward Sr. University Center

The building houses a bookstore, commuter lounge, and office spaces for the Admissions Department, Financial Aid Department, Career Services Department, Student Government Association and the Dean of Students. It is named for 1950 graduate, Norman Ward Sr., an outstanding athlete, teacher, coach, and administrator.

Charles H. Wesley Hall

Wesley Hall houses the College of Arts and Sciences' administrative offices, classrooms and offices. It is named in honor of Central State University's first president, Charles H. Wesley (1941 to 1965).

Joshua I. Smith Center for Education and Natural Sciences

Houses the School of Education and Natural Sciences department of the College of Arts and Sciences. In 2016 it was named after 1963 alum Joshua I. Smith, a retired executive from Caterpillar Inc., who continues to support the university through the College of Business and the university radio station, WCSU.

== Athletics ==
National championships
1960	NCAA Small College Men's Cross Country
1961	NCAA Small College Men's Cross Country
1965	NAIA Men's Basketball
1968	NAIA Men's Basketball
1983	NCAA Division II Runner Up Football
1990	NAIA Division I Football
1991	NAIA Women's Outdoor Track & Field
1992	NAIA Women's Outdoor Track & Field
1992	NAIA Division I Football
1993	NAIA Men's Indoor Track & Field
1993	NAIA Women's Indoor Track & Field
1993	NAIA Men's Outdoor Track & Field
1993	NAIA Women's Outdoor Track & Field
1994	NAIA Men's Indoor Track & Field
1994	NAIA Women's Outdoor Track & Field
1995	NAIA Division I Football
1996	NAIA Women's Indoor Track & Field
1997	NAIA Women's Outdoor Track & Field

Central State athletic teams are the Marauders and Lady Marauders. The university is a member of the Division II level of the National Collegiate Athletic Association (NCAA), primarily competing in the Southern Intercollegiate Athletic Conference (SIAC) since the 2015–16 academic year (with football joining first as an affiliate member from 2013–14 to 2015 before upgrading for all sports). The Marauders and Lady Marauders previously competed in the D-II Great Midwest Athletic Conference (G-MAC) from 2012–13 to 2014–15, and as an NCAA D-II Independent from 2002–03 to 2011–12; as well as competing in the American Mideast Conference of the National Association of Intercollegiate Athletics (NAIA) from 2000–01 to 2001–02.

Central State competes in 11 intercollegiate varsity sports: Men's sports include basketball, cross country, football, track & field (indoor and outdoor) and volleyball; while women's sports include basketball, cross country, track & field (indoor and outdoor) and volleyball.

=== Rivalries ===
CSU's main athletic rivals are the Kentucky State Thorobreds and Thorobrettes and the West Virginia State Yellow Jackets.

== Student activities ==
=== Student organizations ===
There are approximately 30 student organizations operating on campus. These student organizations are classified under six categories: Academic, Business, Special Interest, Religions, Honorary and Greek letter organizations. The Office of the University Center and Student Development in conjunction with the SGA's Inter organization Committee monitors the recognized student organizations activities.

=== Student Government Association ===
The Student Government Association (SGA) serves as a liaison between the students and the administration, sharing decision making responsibility with the faculty and staff on matters that affect campus life. The SGA also oversees many student activities, represents the student body, and serves as an advisory body.

=== Greek Letter organizations ===
All nine of the National Pan-Hellenic Council organizations currently have chapters at Central State University. These organizations are governed by the Central State University's chapter of the National Pan-Hellenic Council and overseen by the Director of the University Center and Student Development.

=== Invincible Marching Marauders ===
The Central State University bands are under the direction of Dr Al Level. The Invincible Marching Marauders appeared in Dave Chappelle's Block Party.

=== University Chorus ===
The Central State University Chorus has twice been nominated for a Grammy Award for its recordings.

== Notable alumni ==
Name	Class year	Notability	Reference(s)
Curtis Anderson	1978	American football player	
Orlando Brown		He transferred to South Carolina State University before graduating	
Hastings Kamuzu Banda	1928	Former President of Malawi	
Joyce Beatty	1972	Member of United States House of Representatives	
Vince Buck	1989	Former NFL player	
Wayne A. Cauthen		First African American appointed as City Manager of Kansas City, Missouri	
Shamika Cotton	1999	Actress	
MacArthur DeShazer, Sr.	1971	Former White House Fellow (1984-85); Former Director, African Affairs, White House National Security Council (1993-96); Former Associate Deputy Secretary for International Labor Affairs, Department of Labor (1998-2001)	
Clay Dixon		Former City Commissioner and Mayor of Dayton, Ohio	
Hugh Douglas	1994	Former NFL defensive lineman New York Jets and Philadelphia Eagles	
Elizabeth Eckford		One of Little Rock Nine	
Derrick L. Foward	1990	President of Dayton Unit NAACP and Vice President of Ohio Conference NAACP	
Barry Hankerson		Record producer and founder of Blackground Records	
Deon Hemmings	1993	Three-time Olympian and former 400m hurdles world-record holder	
Vince Heflin	1981	Former NFL wide receiver for the Miami Dolphins and Tampa Bay Buccaneers	
James T. Henry, Sr.		First Black mayor and city commissioner of Xenia, Ohio (faculty)	
Charles Hope	1993	Former Green Bay Packers guard	
Priest Lauderdale		Former NBA player for the Denver Nuggets and Atlanta Hawks	
Mel Lunsford	1989	Former NFL player	
Omarosa Manigault-Stallworth	1996	Actress (The Apprentice, Surreal Life)	
Kedar Massenberg		Record label executive and producer	
Joyce Mathis	1965	Soprano, winner of the Marian Anderson Award and Young Concert Artists competition	
Eddie Milner		Former professional baseball player for the Cincinnati Reds and San Francisco Giants	
Jeffrey J. Mims, Jr.	1973	Mayor of Dayton, Ohio and Former City Commissioner	
Rob Murphy	1996	Former head basketball coach at Eastern Michigan University	
Roosevelt Nix	1991	American football player	
Leontyne Price		Opera singer	
John Roseboro		Former professional baseball player	
Dayvon Ross	2013	NFL wide receiver	
Teddy Seymour		First African American to sail around the world solo	
John W. Shannon	1955	United States Under Secretary of the Army (1989-1993)	
Darrell K. Smith	1983	Former CFL All-Star for the Toronto Argonauts	
Jason Thomas		9/11 Hero, Keynote Speaker, Extreme Makeover: Home Edition, WTC Movie	
Roger Troutman		Funk singer, composer, arranger, multi-instrumentalist	
Kerwin Waldroup	1995	Former NFL defensive end	
Erik Williams	1990	Former Pro Bowl offensive lineman for the Dallas Cowboys and Baltimore Ravens	
Abram Wilson		California politician, former mayor of San Ramon, California	
Nancy Wilson		Jazz singer	
Roland Winburn	1971	Former member of Ohio House of Representatives	
