= Rhyuhn =

American Composer (born 2006)

- Origin: Philadelphia, Pennsylvania
- Genres: Classical, Rock
- Occupations: Composer, Pianist
- Instruments: Piano, Violin
- Website: rhyuhn.com

Rhyuhn Green (born 2006) is an American composer, pianist, and Kovner Fellow at The Juilliard School. He is the recipient of the Young Artist Award from the Jack Kent Cooke Foundation, the Philadelphia Ballet Fellowship, and the Philadelphia Orchestra's All-City Special-Recognition Award. He is the inaugural graduate scholar of the Marian Anderson Young Artist Program, and appears on show 451 of From the Top with bassist Joseph Conyers. He is best known for his Impromptu in F Minor G.6 "Symbiosis" which he performed on both NPR's Tiny Desk Concerts and From the Top.

== Background and education ==
Rhyuhn Green began to study piano at age two when his aunt, Raveena Green, exposed him to the instrument. Raveena taught him small exercises, scales, and his ABCs on the piano. By age four, Rhyuhn began taking private lessons at a small piano shop down the street from his home. Continuing his studies, at age nine, he began to study with concert-pianist and professor at The Curtis Institute, Michelle Cann. During this time, Green gained experience in the rock style, opening shows for Five Finger Death Punch, Korn, Rob Zombie, Paramore, Bring Me the Horizon, and more, for the 2015 Rock Allegiance with his band 'Zombie Kidz'. He also opened a Clutch concert at Franklin Music Hall (formerly the Electric Factory).

At age twelve, Green made his Carnegie Hall debut in Weill Recital Hall as a winner of the Crescendo International Competition. He then attended the Philadelphia High School for Creative and Performing Arts (CAPA), where he studied violin. While at CAPA, Michelle Cann introduced him to the Marian Anderson Young Artist Program at Play On Philly. After applying and being accepted into the program, he began to pursue musical composition with William Dougherty alongside his piano studies. This laid the foundation for his future work in music-writing. Green was subsequently accepted to Juilliard where he is currently pursuing his Bachelor of Music in composition at the Juilliard School with David Serkin Ludwig. He is the recipient of a Kovner Fellowship, the merit scholarship award that fully covers the estimated cost of attending Juilliard.

== Career ==
Green's compositions have been performed by ensembles including the members of the Philadelphia Ballet orchestra, Juilliard Orchestra, trombonist Dave Taylor, the Manhattan Brass Quintet, and pianist Liam Drake. He served as a guest conductor with the Philadelphia High School for Creative and Performing Arts Orchestra conducting his own commissioned pieces, and also performed with both the CAPA orchestra and choir in a presentation of the Philadelphia Eagles' fight song "Fly Eagles, Fly" under the baton of Yannick Nézet-Séguin.

In 2024, he was selected by the Philadelphia Orchestra's All-City Festival to be the first ever Special-Recognition Award for his compositions. Green then performed his composition Symbiosis in the 2024 Festival at Marian Anderson Hall, hosted by Eva Andersen, and again on NPR's From the Top podcast later that year.

In 2025, Green performed Symbiosis on NPR's Tiny Desk.

== Music ==
Green's compositions traverse the intersection of musical genres.

His musical philosophy is rooted in what Green calls the "Melting Pot" theory, where he envisions the blending of diverse musical styles to create a unified, and inclusive musical experience. Rhyuhn believes that the musical traditions of different cultures, each with their own distinct musical traditions, can be blended together with classical music to engage and broaden audiences.

== Selected solo piano works ==
=== Singles ===
- Symbiosis (2024)
- Susurrus (2024)

=== Pheonixes (stylized as Ph3oniXes) (2025) ===
- 3mb3rs (2025)
- wings (2025)
- c3l3stial bodi3s (2025)
- aton3m3nt (2025)
