= Joyce Mathis =

American soprano

- Mathis in 1967
- Born: April 1943; Chattanooga, Tennessee, U.S.
- Died: March 1994 (aged 50)
- Education: Central State University; Juilliard School
- Occupation: Operatic soprano
- Awards: Marian Anderson Award; Young Concert Artists

Joyce Mathis (April 1943 – March 1994) was an American soprano who was a concert artist, recitalist, and opera singer from the 1960s into the early 1990s. She is considered a part of the first generation of black classical singers to achieve success in the United States; breaking down racial barriers within the field of classical music. She won several notable singing competitions, including the Marian Anderson Award in 1967 and the Young Concert Artists in 1968. In 1970 she recorded the role of the High Priestess in Verdi's Aida alongside Leontyne Price and Plácido Domingo. Pulitzer Prize-winning composer Ned Rorem wrote his song cycle Women's Voices for her in 1975. In 1976 she created the role of Celestina in Roger Ames's opera Amistad at the John F. Kennedy Center for the Performing Arts. She appeared frequently in performances with Opera Ebony and the Boys Choir of Harlem in addition to touring widely as a recitalist and concert soprano.

== Early life and career ==
Born in Chattanooga, Tennessee, to Ezra and Nellie Mathis, Joyce J. Mathis was born in April 1943. She graduated from the Howard School of Academics and Technology in 1961. After studying singing in her native city with J. Oscar Miller, she earned a bachelor's degree in vocal performance from Central State University in 1965. She then pursued graduate studies at the Juilliard School where she was a pupil of Florence Kimball, the teacher of Leontyne Price. Price mentored Mathis in the early part of her career.

In 1964 Mathis was a regional winner of the Metropolitan Opera National Council Auditions. In 1967 she won the Marian Anderson Award. That same year she was the soprano soloist in Beethoven's Egmont with the Cosmopolitan Young Peoples Symphony Orchestra under Chilean conductor Juan Pablo Izquierdo at Philharmonic Hall. She also performed with the American Opera Society at Carnegie Hall in 1967 in the role of Clotilda in Bellini's Norma with Elena Souliotis in the title role and Nancy Tatum as Adalgisa; and she created the role of Gismonda in Thomas Pasatieri's Padrevia at the Brooklyn Academy of Music.

In 1968 Mathis won the Young Concert Artists competition which led to her New York recital debut at the Weill Recital Hall of Carnegie Hall in March 1969. In 1968 she performed in concerts with the Symphony of the New World, the first racially integrated orchestra in the United States, in concerts of Four Last Songs by Richard Strauss and works by John Lewis and Arthur Cunningham. In 1969 she performed in major concert venues throughout the United States as a part of the "American Youth Performs" concert tour sponsored by American Airlines. That same year she performed the Hugo Weisgall's opera monodrama The Stronger in a concert organized by the League of Composers at the 92nd Street Y.

== Later life and career ==
In 1970 Mathis recorded the role of the High Priestess in Giuseppe Verdi's Aida with Leontyne Price in the title role, Luciano Pavarotti as Radamès, Grace Bumbry as Amneris, and the London Symphony Orchestra, conducted by Erich Leinsdorf. That same year she was the featured soloist in the inaugural concert of the St. Louis Symphony Youth Orchestra with conductor Leonard Slatkin, performing works by Mozart, Puccini, and Gershwin. In November 1970, she was the soprano soloist in the world premiere of George Rochberg's Symphony No. 3 at Lincoln Center.

In 1973 Mathis and William Warfield were the featured performers at the National Association of Negro Musicians convention in Atlanta with conductor Everett Lee. Ned Rorem's song cycle Women's Voices was written for her; a work which Rorem described as the composition "closest to his heart". She debuted the work at Alice Tully Hall on November 4, 1976. In describing what it was like to hear Mathis perform this cycle, Rorem stated, "It is so to speak, an uncomfortable privilege—a pleasurable torture—to sit in the audience and hear a really good performer execute one's intimate sounds, hitherto so private, now hopelessly so public."

In 1976 Mathis created the role of Celestina in the world premiere of Roger Ames's opera Amistad at the John F. Kennedy Center for the Performing Arts. In 1977 she gave a concert of music at Fisk University in celebration of the inauguration of Walter J. Leonard as the ninth president of the institution. In 1979 she gave a recital at Alice Tully Hall.

In 1982 Mathis was the soprano soloist in the world premiere of George Walker's Cantata for Soprano, Tenor, Boys Choir, and Chamber Orchestra with tenor Walter Turnbull, the Boys Choir of Harlem, the Orchestra of St. Luke's, and conductor Warren George Wilson. She performed that work again in 1986 at Chicago's Orchestra Hall with conductor Paul Freeman, the Orchestra of Illinois, and the Boys Choir of Harlem. In February 1983 she performed scenes from Mark Fax's opera Til Victory Is Won with Opera Ebony and the American Symphony Orchestra at Carnegie Hall. The following December she performed the role Siebel in Gounod's Faust with that company at Aaron Davis Hall of the City College of New York. She performed with Opera Ebony again in 1987 as Irina in Weill's Lost in the Stars.

In 1993 Mathis was the soprano soloist in Villa-Lobos' Bachianas Brasileiras with the Boys Choir of Harlem at the Richard Rodgers Theatre. In 1994 the Festival Ensemble of the American Academy of Arts and Letters dedicated a performance of Haydn's The Creation to her.

The April 2009 obituary for her sister Margaret in The Chattanoogan mentions that Joyce Mathis preceded her in death.
