= Billie Lynn Daniel =

American opera singer (1932–2002)

Billie Lynn Daniel (May 21, 1932 – 2002) was an American operatic soprano and composer. A winner of several notable vocal competitions, she was best known for her portrayal of Clara in Porgy and Bess and for her work as an exponent of American art song. She performed the world premieres of works by composers Richard Hundley, William Flanagan, and Claude Debussy among other composers.

== Career ==
Daniel was born in New York City, where she was raised. She made her Broadway debut as one of the Female Saints in the revival of Virgil Thomson's Four Saints in Three Acts with Leontyne Price. She made her professional recital debut at Carnegie Hall in 1959 with The New York Times stating "[Daniel is] a vocalist who has something to say in song repertory, and the voice and the technique with which to say it." She performed in recital at Carnegie Hall again in 1970.

A graduate of the Juilliard School, in 1961 Daniel won both the Metropolitan Opera National Council Auditions and the Town Hall Recital Award . That same year she portrayed Clara in the New York City Center revival of George Gershwin's Porgy and Bess with William Warfield and Martha Flowers in the title roles. In 1962 she performed the world premieres of Claude Debussy's Les papillons and William Flanagan's Moss with pianist Lowell Farr at the Town Hall in New York City. In 1963 she won the Marian Anderson Award in Philadelphia.

In 1972 composer Richard Hundley wrote his song cycle Birds, U.S.A. with text by James Purdy for Daniel. In 1975 she appeared jointly with her husband, baritone Andrew Frierson, in recital at Alice Tully Hall. In 1981 she sang Clara in concert with Thomas Carey as Porgy, Cab Calloway as Sport'n Life, and the Oklahoma City Philharmonic. She composed music for Margaret Yuen and the Red Silk Dancers' adaptation of J. E. Franklin's play Black Girl in 1993.

Daniel and Frierson's daughter, actress Andrea Frierson, married actor Jesse D. Goins in 1977. Andrea later married actor David Toney.

Daniel died in 2002.
