= Andrew Frierson =

American opera singer (1924–2018)

Andrew Benny Frierson (March 29, 1924 – December 6, 2018) was an American operatic baritone and music educator. He was part of the first generation of black opera singers to achieve success and is viewed as part of an instrumental group of performers who helped break down the barriers of racial prejudice in the opera world. In 2000 he was the recipient of the Legacy Award by the National Opera Association, an award given annually to recognize the contributions made by African-American artists to opera in America.

== Life and career ==
Born in Columbia, Tennessee on March 29, 1924, Frierson was raised in Kentucky. He earned degrees in vocal performance from the Manhattan School of Music and the Juilliard School, and has taught on the voice faculties of Southern University and Oberlin College. At Juilliard he studied voice with Belle Julie Soudant; the teacher of opera singers Frances Bible and Gloria Davy. In his early career he was a member of The Belafonte Folk Singers with whom he performed and made recordings both with and without Harry Belafonte.

Frierson made his professional opera debut in 1958 as Cal in Marc Blitzstein's Regina with the New York City Opera; a role which he also recorded with the NYCO on disc for Sony. He continued to perform with the NYCO for the next six consecutive seasons, portraying such roles as Henry Davis in Street Scene, the King in Aida, the Messenger/the Shepherd in Oedipus rex, Schlémil / Wolfram/ Hermann in The Tales of Hoffmann, and the title role in Gershwin's Porgy and Bess.

In 1960 Frierson performed the role of Don Alfonso in Così fan tutte with the Chautauqua Opera; notably touring with that production to Bermuda. In 1961 he portrayed Joe in the New York City Center revival of Jerome Kern's Show Boat opposite Jo Sullivan Loesser as Magnolia, Anita Darian as Julie, Robert Rounseville as Gaylord, and Carol Brice as Queenie. He notably sang the song Ol' Man River on The Ed Sullivan Show. In 1975 he appeared jointly with his wife, soprano Billie Lynn Daniel, in recital at Alice Tully Hall. In 1980 he performed the role of Cal in the Houston Grand Opera production of Regina.

Frierson and Daniel's daughter, actress Andrea Frierson, married actor Jesse D. Goins in 1977. Andrea later married actor David Toney.

Frierson died in Oberlin, Ohio, aged 94.
