= Marian Anderson: The Lincoln Memorial Concert =

1939 documentary film

- The 90-second newsreel report of Anderson's concert, as distributed in 1939.
- Release date: 1939
- Country: United States

Marian Anderson: The Lincoln Memorial Concert is a 1939 documentary film that documents a concert performance by African American opera singer Marian Anderson after the Daughters of the American Revolution (DAR) had her barred from singing in Washington D.C.'s Constitution Hall because she was Black. Officials of the District of Columbia also barred her from performing in the auditorium of a White public high school. First Lady Eleanor Roosevelt helped hold the concert at Lincoln Memorial, on federal property. The performance on Easter Sunday, April 9, 1939, was attended by 75,000. In 2001, this documentary film was selected for preservation in the National Film Registry by the Library of Congress.
