= LaDeva Davis =

American television chief (1944–2022)

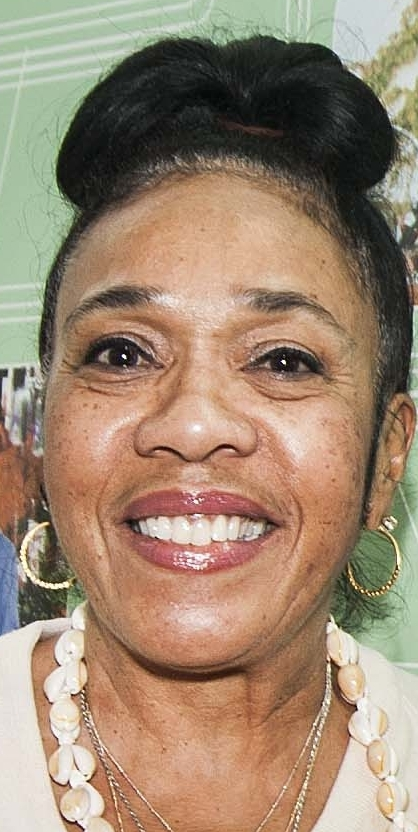
- Born: March 22, 1944; Philadelphia, Pennsylvania, U.S.
- Died: September 8, 2022 (aged 78)
- Education: Philadelphia Musical Academy
- Occupations: Cook, television presenter, teacher

LaDeva M. Davis (1944 – September 8, 2022) was an American television presenter and food educator who starred in the American public television series What's Cooking? She was the first African-American woman to have her own nationally syndicated public TV cooking show in the United States on the Public Broadcasting Service. She was awarded the Mary McLeod Bethune Award in 2015.

== Education ==
Davis attended Germantown High School in Philadelphia, Pennsylvania, alongside Lola Falana and Judith Jamison. She earned her bachelor's degree in music education at the Philadelphia Musical Academy (now the University of the Arts) while studying piano with Natalie Hinderas.

== Teaching career ==
Davis first started teaching at Bartlett Junior High (now the Academy at Palumbo) in 1965. She taught at Bartlett for 12 years before becoming a core faculty member of the Philadelphia High School for the Creative and Performing Arts (CAPA) since its opening in 1978. As CAPA's dance director and choreographer, Davis helped write the dance curriculum at the school. Davis also planned "CAPA Kids" – an artistic showcase that is part of Philadelphia's annual Thanksgiving Day Parade. Among the students that she mentored at CAPA included the members of Boyz II Men.

Davis was also an associate in performance and dance instructor at Swarthmore College.

== What's Cooking? ==
Davis starred in What's Cooking?, a nationally syndicated PBS cooking show that was the first broadcast on January 21, 1975. Davis was not a professional chef before the show but was recruited for her charisma and humor. What's Cooking? was produced by Lynn Lonker and featured low-cost, nutritional meals that could be made usually for no more than $2.25. On being the first African-American woman to have her own nationally syndicated public TV cooking show on PBS, Davis said, "There was no black woman cooking [on TV]. There were no black cooks period."

In 1976, she was a repeat guest on the American daytime talk show The Mike Douglas Show to demonstrate her cooking.

Davis was featured in the Smithsonian Institution's National Museum of American History's exhibit "Food: Transforming the American Table 1950–2000" exhibit. Some of Davis' aprons are in the Smithsonian collections as well.

== Awards and recognition ==
In 2015, Davis was awarded the National Council of Negro Women's Mary McLeod Bethune Award for leadership, excellence, and achievement in education.

== Death ==
Davis died on September 8, 2022, after having a stroke.
