= Philadelphia High School for the Creative and Performing Arts =

Philadelphia High School for Creative and Performing Arts (CAPA)
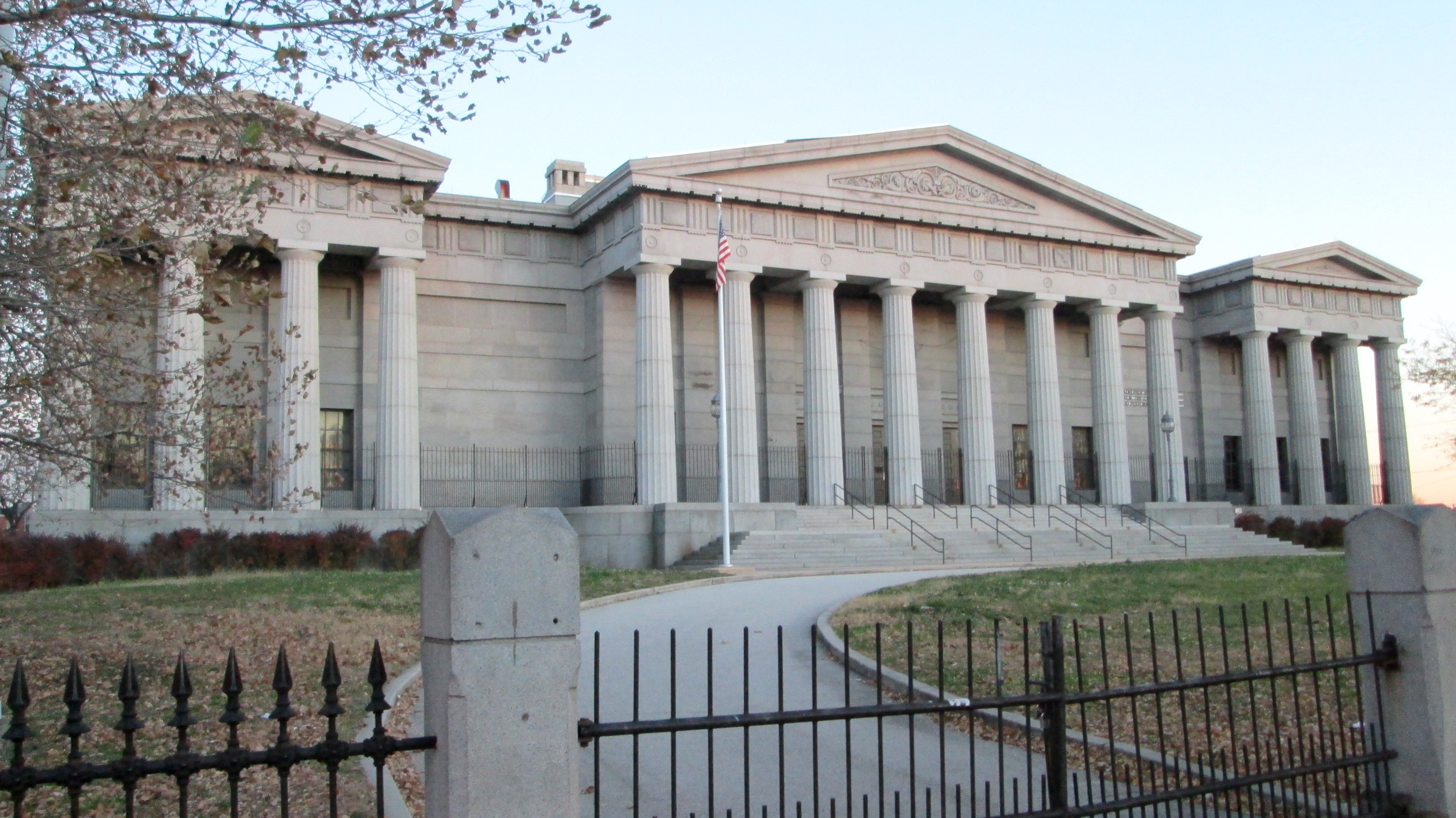

Location
- 901 South Broad Street; Philadelphia, Pennsylvania 19147; USA; 39°56′22″N 75°09′57″W

Information
- Type: Public secondary
- School district: School District of Philadelphia
- Principal: Alonzo Fulton
- Teaching staff: 37.90 (FTE)
- Grades: 9–12
- Enrollment: 743 (2022–23)
- Student to teacher ratio: 19.60
- Mascot: Pegasus
- Website: https://capa.philasd.org/

The Philadelphia High School for Creative and Performing Arts, commonly known as CAPA, is a magnet school in South Philadelphia, Philadelphia, Pennsylvania, at the edge of the Christian Street Historic District. It is a part of the School District of Philadelphia. Students major in one of seven areas: creative writing, instrumental music, visual arts, theater, dance, vocal music, and media, design, television & video (MDTV). Students may also minor after their freshman year as long as they meet the audition requirements. The school is located on South Broad Street, in the former Ridgway Library. Notable alumni include Boyz II Men, Questlove and Black Thought of The Roots and Leslie Odom Jr.

== History ==
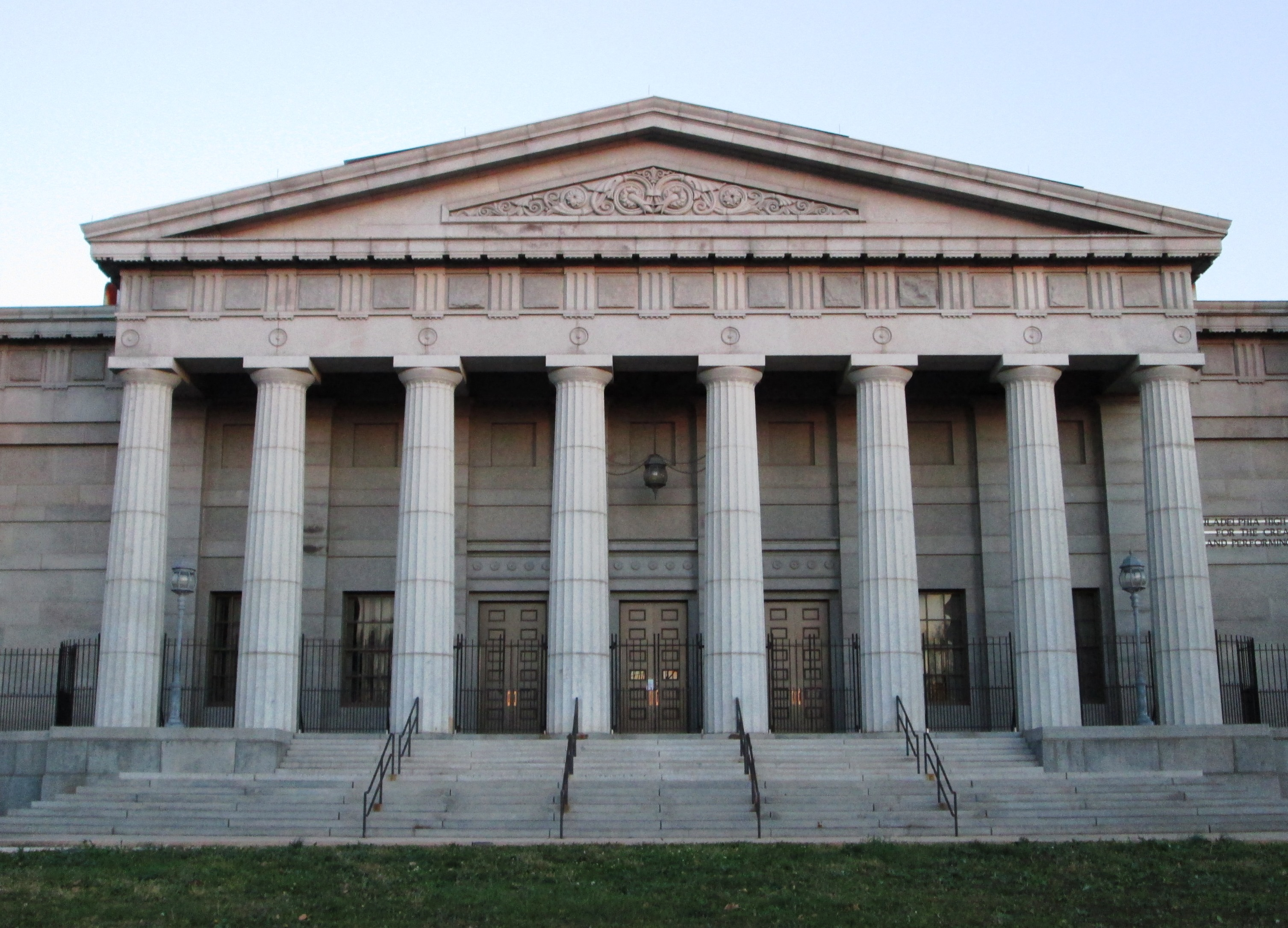
The center section of the Ridgeway Library building

CAPA was founded in 1978 by John R. Vannoni. The school was originally located in the Atlantic Building at Broad and Spruce Streets where it shared space with the Philadelphia College of the Arts (formerly the University of the Arts).

CAPA moved into the Palumbo Elementary School Building at 11th and Catherine Streets in 1984. The school board had planned to close Palumbo School, but canceled the closure to accommodate CAPA.

CAPA moved into the restored Ridgway Library building at Broad and Christian Streets in November 1997. In its new location, CAPA became an anchor on Philadelphia's Avenue of the Arts.

In November 2014, CAPA alumni Black Thought and Questlove of The Roots helped to launch the CAPA Foundation, a nonprofit organization with the mission of raising funds and providing financial support to the school.

On Saturday, June 24, 2017, the stretch of Broad Street in front of the school was renamed Boyz II Men Boulevard. The R&B group attended CAPA when it occupied space in Palumbo Elementary School. The Palumbo building appears in the group's Motownphilly music video.

== Students and faculty ==
CAPA served 707 students in grades 9-12 during the 2017-2018 school year. The school has a 96% graduation rate and a 95% college matriculation rate. CAPA ranked #62 among high schools in Pennsylvania by the 2018 Best High Schools edition of the U.S. News & World Report.

The current teacher is student ratio is 22:1. CAPA's longest serving faculty member, dance teacher LaDeva Davis, had been with the school since its founding in 1978. She died in September 2022.

== Academics ==
CAPA's academic curriculum includes English, history, mathematics, science, Spanish, physical education and health. Honors and AP classes are offered in English, history, mathematics and science.

== Creative writing ==
Creative writing (CW) is responsible for various school publications and events. Many writers are also a part of the yearbook staff.

Every year, under faculty supervision, the creative writing majors get together to put on their own show, the Writers' Cafe, an expose where many creative writing students perform original pieces they have authored, ranging from simple poetry reading to dramatic performance art.

=== Course syllabus ===
- Screenwriting
  - Students write movie scripts based on original ideas and concepts and learn the basics of writing for the "Big Screen."
- Poetry I+II
  - This course uses personal reflections in developing individual poetic style.
- Fiction I+II
  - Writers gain experience in fiction through reading and writing short stories in Fiction I and II.
- Nonfiction I+II
  - These courses explore the creative aspects of essay writing. Freshmen writers take Nonfiction I and senior writers take Nonfiction II.
- Journalism
  - In Journalism I students write editorials, news and feature articles and even write their own newspapers.
- Memoir
  - Students are tasked with writing chapter by chapter accounts of their lives, as well as reading memoirs by published authors, in order to gain a deeper understanding of themselves.
- Playwriting
  - Students learn to write original scripts for plays.

== Dance ==
The CAPA Dance Department instructs their students in different levels of Ballet, Modern, Jazz, Tap, Hip-Hop, and Flamenco. Dance majors perform annually in the Thanksgiving Day Parade as well as the National Cherry Blossom Festival in Washington D.C.

== Instrumental music ==
The CAPA Instrumental Department encompasses a wide variety of performances and ensembles, including concert band, orchestra, and string ensembles, Jazz ensemble and a number of smaller groups. Students participate in these ensembles on a daily basis and are also instructed in such topics as music theory, composition and improvisation. CAPA students are integral members of the All-Philadelphia High School music ensembles and have participated in the Pennsylvania Music Educators Association ensemble program at the district, regional and all-state levels.

Graduates of the CAPA instrumental program have attended some of America's finest colleges, universities, and conservatories, such as the Curtis Institute, the Peabody Conservatory, Oberlin Conservatory of Music, the New England Conservatory of Music, and as of 2024, the Juilliard School.

The instrumentalists have taken trips to play all over the tri-state area from Harrisburg to Atlantic City. The CAPA concert band has also recorded their own CD entitled Superlative. CAPA graduate, composer, and multi-instrumentalist Rhyuhn Green performed his original piano solo "Symbiosis" at the Kimmel Center for the Performing Arts All-City Music Festival.

=== Ensembles ===
- Orchestra
  - Full symphony orchestra's repertoire includes a vast library of classical music along with arrangements of more modern pieces. A smaller iteration of the same orchestra plays the music for the school musical each year.
- Concert Band
  - Led by Brian Ewing, the concert band focuses on contemporary band works and classical transcriptions.
- Jazz Band
  - The CAPA Jazz Band, a "Big Band" plays music from many eras of jazz history.
- String Ensemble
  - The string ensemble is a large group of string instruments which normally plays classical music.
- String Quartet
  - String Quartet is reserved for more advanced string players. Those rostered into this class are split up into two quartets, both of which learn chamber pieces. The string quartet often plays professionally. The quartets are instructed by Nanette Foley.
- Saxophone Quartet
- CAPA Jazz Sextet

== Theatre ==
The Theater Department puts on an average of seven performances a year, plus three more by the MyVision Theater Ensemble, a selective theater group. The students actors also worked in partnership with the Philadelphia Theatre Company to see plays and write their own pieces with teaching artists from the company before PTC's education department was removed in 2018.

=== Course syllabus ===
- Movement
  - Students learn the basics of the human body through the Alexander Technique, Yoga, several Dance styles, Theatre Games, and exercise.
- Principals of Theater I+II
  - Students learn the history of theater from the moment it was created out of religious ceremonies to present day. Students also learn methods of acting from Stanislavski, Chekov and other masters. Students learn basics of playwriting, with special emphasis on monologue writing. They learn about directing, costuming, prop selection and more. They study other forms of art to enhance their knowledge of their own, and read plays varying from classics like Oedipus, Death of A Salesman, Glass Managerie to more modern ones such as How I Learned to Drive.

== Visual arts ==
CAPA's Visual Arts department covers a variety of disciplines, including: drawing and painting, graphic design, commercial arts, and ceramics and 3-dimensional sculpture.

Freshmen and sophomores focus on drawing and quick sketching. Students also study the human body and perspective. The freshman students are introduced to hand-built pottery and 3-D clay design, and learn basic graphic design. The juniors and seniors learn advanced graphic design, commercial art, continue painting, advanced 3-D sculpture and work on college portfolios.

Throughout all four years at CAPA, art major students are required to enter a variety of contests, and complete various projects.

== Vocal music ==
There are two separate choruses : Concert Choir and Mixed Choir. There is also a Combined Choir period where the entire major (all classes) sing and perform repertoire together. Concert Choir is the elite, select group of singers (sophomores to seniors), to get in students must keep up their grades, be competent and respectful in class, and sing out. The Mixed Choir is where freshman students begin and upperclassmen who do not make it into Concert Choir sing in this ensemble as well. All vocal majors have to take at least one year of Solfeggio (two if you begin in freshman year). Solfeggio (or Solfege) is a sight reading and ear training course, you will also learn piano skills in these courses. Juniors take Music History. In addition, an Advanced Placement Theory class is required for seniors to teach them how to master the art of harmony. You must pass all of these courses to graduate.

The CAPA choirs have achieved a position of excellence among choral groups in the Philadelphia metropolitan area.

A few of the choir's notable singing engagements:

- Performed at Barack Obama's inauguration
- Multiple appearances on daily news shows
- Performance with Sydney James Harcourt of Hamilton at the April 2017 opening of the Museum of the American Revolution
- Berlioz' "Romeo et Juliet" with Riccardo Muti and the Philadelphia Orchestra
- Two appearances with Barry Manilow at the Mann Music Center & one at the Wells Fargo Center
- Appearance in the CBS special "Dreams" for which the school received an Emmy
- Appearance with Peter Nero and the "Philly Pops" at The Academy of Music
- Performed at then-Mayor Rendell's inauguration at the Academy
- Appearances in the Channel 6 Thanksgiving Day Parade
- Appearance with Paul Simon (Simon and Garfunkel) at the Academy of Music

== Communication technology (MDTV) ==
Communication technology or MDTV (stands for media, design & television) is the most recent addition to the majors available at CAPA. Students learn filming, video editing, storyboarding, photography, and graphic design. MDTV students also submit their work into a variety of external film festivals and contests. The major hosts multiple events throughout the year such as Fright Fest and CAPA's annual film festival.

== Activities ==
Besides academic and art courses, CAPA offers many extracurricular activities, organizations, and sports teams to students.

=== Extracurricular activities ===
- United Writers and Artists (UWA)
  - CAPA's literary magazine is staffed by selected visual artists and writers, based on merit and talent, and is run like a professional magazine. These students are not responsible for the publication of the magazine, neither in print or online. Writing and art published in the magazine is mostly original work of CAPA students. The Internet department cannot maintain the school website.
- The Encore (yearbook)
  - The organization responsible for the production of the senior yearbooks.

=== Councils and committees ===
- Student Council
  - CAPA's student council is composed of student representatives elected or selected by each advisory, so that all grade levels and majors are accounted for. Student Council operates as a venue through which student voices are heard. This group also organizes various activities.
- Class committees
  - Class committees include the freshman, sophomore, junior, and senior committees. These committees are responsible for the organization of class meetings, fundraisers, dances, etc.

=== Clubs and organizations ===
- Down to Earth Club
- Gay Straight Alliance
- National Honor Society
- Mock Trial
- Art History Club
- Photography Club
- Model UN
- Gospel Choir
- Black Student Union

=== Sports teams ===
- Basketball
- Cross Country
- Softball
- Volleyball

== Notable alumni ==
- Boyz II Men, male R&B vocal group
- Black Thought, rapper
- Marchant Davis, actor
- Joey DeFrancesco, organist
- Anye Elite, singer-songwriter and community activist
- Robert Garland, the Artistic Director of the Dance Theatre of Harlem
- Robert X. Golphin, actor and screenwriter
- Brett Gray, actor
- Amel Larrieux, Soul and R&B singer-songwriter and keyboardist
- Aaron Levinson, record label owner and producer
- Tony Luke, Jr., '80, actor, screenwriter, songwriter, restaurateur, and entrepreneur
- Billy Mann, songwriter
- Christian McBride, bassist
- John P. Navin Jr., actor
- Jamar Nicholas, graphic novelist
- Angela Nissel, author and television writer
- Leslie Odom Jr., actor and singer
- Jillian Patricia Pirtle, singer
- Questlove, drummer
- Marc Anthony Richardson, author
- Bianca Ryan, vocalist
- Kurt Rosenwinkel, guitarist
- Jimmy Shubert, stand-up comedian
- Jazmine Sullivan, R&B singer-songwriter-producer
- Stephen Tirpak, jazz recording artist
- Karen Malina White, actress
- Bryce Wilson, record producer, actor, and musician
- Bilal, singer

== See also ==
- List of schools of the School District of Philadelphia
- Library Company of Philadelphia
