= Play On Philly =

American music education organization

Play on Philly
- Formation: 2011
- Type: Music Education
- Purpose: Development of young Philadelphia-area musicians
- Location: Philadelphia, Pennsylvania
- Region served: Philadelphia
- Executive Director: Jessica Zweig
- Website: playonphilly.org

Play on Philly, commonly known as POP, is an American music education organization dedicated to the development of young musicians. Based in Philadelphia, Pennsylvania, it was co-founded by Stanford Thompson and Carole Haas Gravagno. Using the El Sistema method to provide musical education, Play On Philly offers free music instruction to students, whom are often from low-income communities and have had little to no exposure to formal musical training. The program acquired the Marian Anderson Award in 2022.

== History ==
At age 28, then Curtis Institute of Music student Stanford Thompson first learned of Abreu and El Sistema. After graduating, Thompson became one of the pioneering Abreu Fellows studying the El Sistema method. After completing his postgraduate studies at the New England Conservatory, he then returned to Philadelphia and joined up with Carole Haas Gravagno to become the co-founders of Play On, Philly! in 2011. After being unable to partner with School District officials or charter schools, POP started its first after-school program with 110 students in grades 1–8. Taking place at a Catholic school in West Philadelphia, St. Francis de Sales., the program began to take off, inducing a lottery for admission. A year later it expanded to Freir Charter Middle School in Center City.

During the following academic year in 2012, POP students received three hours of music instruction daily in small group music theory and chamber rehearsals. Students performed in the St. Patrick's Day Parade, to a full orchestra conducted by Sir Simon Rattle, and played Brahms in Marian Anderson Hall (formerly Verizon Hall) as an opener for the Philadelphia Orchestra.

== Music ensembles ==
The Play on Philly organization has a total of 5 programs:

- An after-school music education program known as POP Music Centers.
- An orchestra known as the POP Children's Orchestra.
- A chamber music program known as the POP Chamber Program.
- A summer music program known as the POP Summer Program.
- A musical training program known as the Marian Anderson Young Artist Program.

== The Marian Anderson Young Artist Program ==
In 2022, POP acquired the Marian Anderson Award originally established in 1943 by African-American contralto Marian Anderson. The independent organization running the award program dissolved and Play On Philly became the administrators of the award. Using the obtained funds, Play On Philly created the Marian Anderson Young Artists Program, which supports students and offers private lessons free of charge at the levels of student apprentice and scholar.

Leadership team:

- Anna Meyer, program manager
- Andrés González, music director

== Notable alumni ==
- Rhyuhn Green, composer and multi-instrumentalist
- Sophia Radford, flute
