= Marguerite Krull =

American classical soprano

Marguerite Krull is an American classical soprano who has had an active international performance career since the 1990s. Due to her wide vocal range, she also sings several roles traditionally performed by mezzo-sopranos.

== Life and career ==
Born and raised in Ann Arbor, Michigan, Krull attended the Peabody Institute at Johns Hopkins University where she earned a Bachelor of Music degree in Piano Performance. She went on to earn her master's degree in Vocal Performance from Stony Brook University (SBU). At SBU she studied singing with Elaine Bonazzi, and early on in her career she won several prestigious awards; including the Marian Anderson Award in 1997, a Sullivan Foundation Award, and a Richard R. Gold Career Grant.

Krull made her debut at the New York City Opera (NYCO) in 1994 as Rosina in The Barber of Seville, and subsequently performed the title role in Maurice Ravel's L'enfant et les sortilèges with that company in 1999. In 2001 she portrayed Cherubino in the NYCO's production of The Marriage of Figaro; a role she later portrayed for her debut at the Lyric Opera of Chicago in 2003. In 2007 she returned to the NYCO as Emilia in George Frideric Handel’s Flavio.

In 1995 Krull performed the role of Phoebe in the Glimmerglass Opera's production of The Yeomen of the Guard, and returned to Glimmerglass in 1996 as Ramiro in La finta giardiniera. In 2000 she performed the role of Giulietta in the Berkshire Opera's production of I Capuleti e i Montecchi. In 2001 she performed the role of Desdemona in Otello at the Caramoor International Music Festival.

Her other performance credits include Donna Elvira in Wolfgang Amadeus Mozart's Don Giovanni at the Teatro Colón in Bogotá, New Orleans Opera, and Opera Grand Rapids, and the title role of Gioachino Rossini's Elisabetta, regina d'Inghilterra at La Monnaie in Brussels and in Amsterdam. She also recently performed the title role in a semi-staged performances of Maurice Ravel's L'enfant et les sortilèges with the National Symphony Orchestra.
