= Bethel United Methodist Church (Bethel Acres, Oklahoma) =

Church building in Oklahoma, United States

Coordinates: 35°18′17″N 97°01′38″W

Bethel United Methodist Church is located on Hardesty Road in Bethel Acres, Oklahoma. It is one of several churches located in the community.

== History ==
The Bethel United Methodist Church was founded in a log school house on June 12, 1898. It was called "The Bethel Methodist Episcopal Church, South". The present church was built in 1903 and opened on December 11 of that year. In those early years the church raised cotton and farmed to supplement its income. The church closed from 1942-1946 due to the effects of The Great Depression and World War II. It then reopened and has gone through periods of expansion until its present size. The parsonage was added in 1984. The Family Life Center was added in 2002. The name was changed to Bethel United Methodist Church in 1968 due to denominational restructuring.

== Important Dates ==
- 1898-The church was organized.
- 1903-A new building was built.
- 1904-The church bought the cemetery.
- 1942-The church closed due to World War II.
- 1946-World War II ended and services resumed.
- 1953-The bell tower was constructed.
- 1958-The church hosted their first Vacation Bible School.
- 1964-The Fellowship Hall was constructed to allow the church to grow.
- 1975-Sunday School Classes moved into their new rooms.
- 1977-Steel siding was purchased to beautify the building.
- 2000-Construction of a multipurpose building began.

== Location ==
The BUMC is located at 35500 Hardesty Road Shawnee, Oklahoma 74801. Although the address in a Shawnee address the church is located in Bethel Acres. Bethel does not have a post office, so mailing addresses are listed as Shawnee or Tecumseh generally.
