= Marian Anderson Award =

American music award

The Marian Anderson Award was originally established in 1943 by African American singer Marian Anderson, after she was awarded The Philadelphia Award (and the cash prize that came with it) in 1940. Anderson used the award money to establish a singing competition to help support young singers; recipients of which include Camilla Williams (1943, 1944), Nathaniel Dickerson (1944), Louise Parker (1944), Eudice Mesibov (1946), Mattiwilda Dobbs (1947), Rawn Spearman (1949), Georgia Laster (1951), Betty Allen (1952), Gloria Davy (1952), Judith Raskin (1952, 1953), Shirlee Emmons (1953), Miriam Holman (1954), Willis Patterson (1956), Shirley Verrett (1957), Joanna Simon (1962), Billie Lynn Daniel (1963), and Joyce Mathis (1967). Eventually, the prize fund ran out of money and it was disbanded. Florence Quivar was the last recipient of this earlier award in 1976.

In 1990, the award was re-established and has dispensed $25,000 annually. In 1998, the prize was restructured with the "Marian Anderson Award" going to an established artist, not necessarily a singer, who exhibits leadership in a humanitarian area. A separate prize, the "Marian Anderson Prize for Emerging Classical Artists" is given to promising young classical singers.

In 2022, the independent organization running the award program dissolved, and Play On Philly, an after-school classical music education program, became the administrators of the award.

== Awardees by year ==
Below are the names of those who received the award since its reinstatement in 1990. Bill Cosby's 2009 award was rescinded by the committee after multiple allegations of sexual assault were made public. In 2018, Queen Latifah was poised to receive the award, but later announced that she wouldn't be accepting it due to "personal reasons"; that year's award ceremony was postponed indefinitely.

The award was not issued in 2020 or 2021, due to the COVID-19 pandemic.

- 1990 – Sylvia McNair
- 1991 – Denyce Graves
- 1992 – Philip Zawisza
- 1993 – Nancy Maultsby
- 1994 – Patricia Racette
- 1995 – Michelle DeYoung
- 1996 – Nathan Gunn
- 1997 – Marguerite Krull
- 1998 – Harry Belafonte
- 1999 – Gregory Peck
- 2000 – Elizabeth Taylor
- 2001 – Quincy Jones
- 2002 – Danny Glover
- 2003 – Oprah Winfrey
- 2005 – Ruby Dee and Ossie Davis
- 2006 – Sidney Poitier
- 2007 – Richard Gere
- 2008 – Maya Angelou and Norman Lear
- 2009 – Bill Cosby (rescinded)
- 2011 – Mia Farrow
- 2012 – J'Nai Bridges
- 2013 – Berry Gordy
- 2014 – Jon Bon Jovi
- 2015 – Wynton Marsalis
- 2016 – Patti LaBelle and Gamble and Huff
- 2017 – Dionne Warwick
- 2018 – Queen Latifah (did not accept)
- 2019 – Kool & the Gang
- 2020 – canceled due to COVID-19 pandemic
- 2021 – canceled due to COVID-19 pandemic
