= Marian Anderson =

African-American contralto (1897–1993)

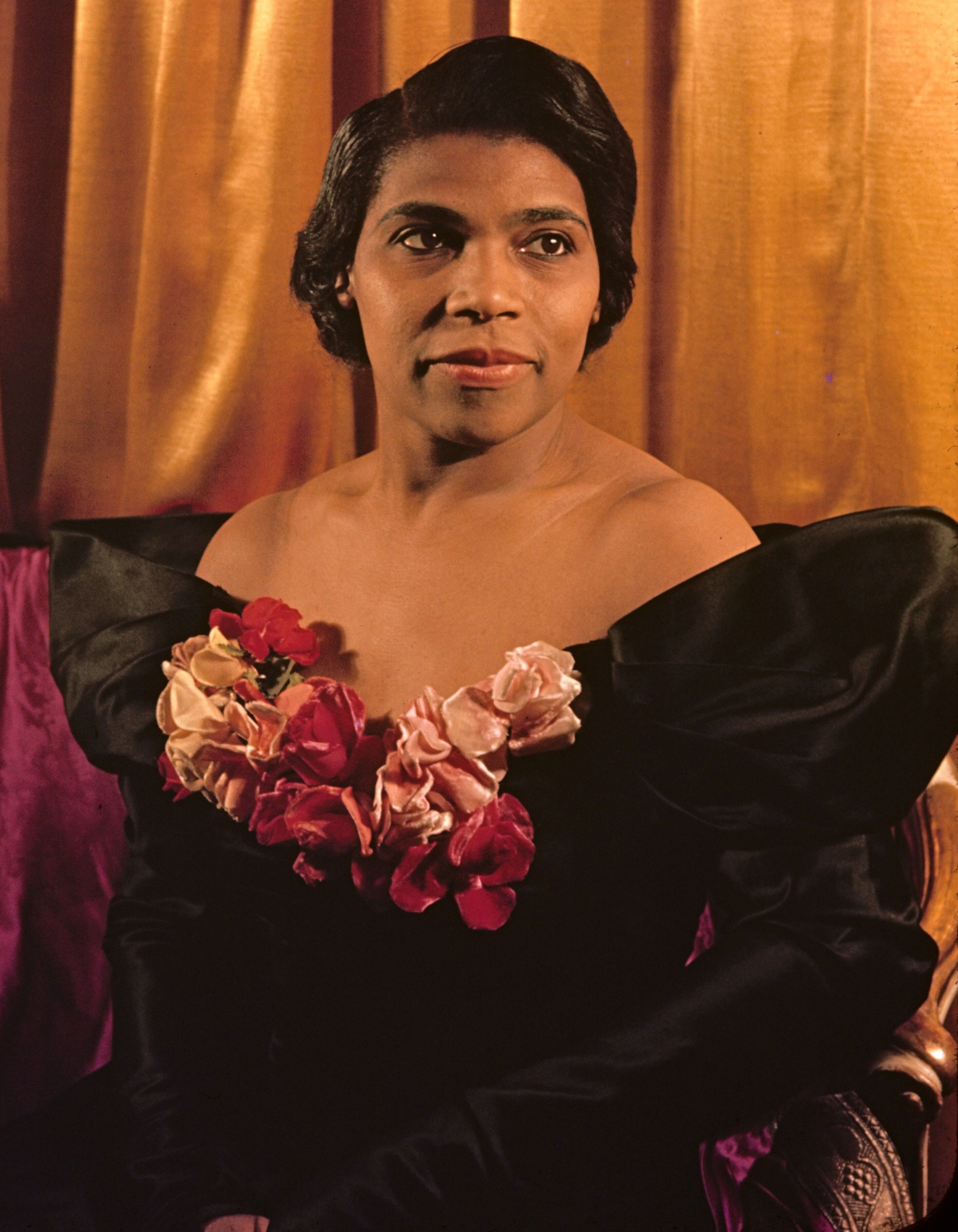
- Anderson in 1940
- Born: February 27, 1897; Philadelphia, Pennsylvania U.S.
- Died: April 8, 1993 (aged 96); Portland, Oregon, U.S.
- Occupation: Operatic contralto

Marian Anderson (February 27, 1897 – April 8, 1993) was an American contralto. She performed a wide range of music, from opera to spirituals. Anderson performed with renowned orchestras in major concert and recital venues throughout the United States and Europe between 1925 and 1965.

Anderson was an important figure in the struggle for Black American artists to overcome racial prejudice in the United States during the mid-twentieth century. In 1939, during the period of racial segregation, the Daughters of the American Revolution (DAR) refused to allow Anderson to sing to an integrated audience in Constitution Hall in Washington, D.C. The incident placed Anderson in the spotlight of the international community on a level unusual for a classical musician. With the aid of First Lady Eleanor Roosevelt and her husband, President Franklin D. Roosevelt, Anderson performed a critically acclaimed open-air concert on Easter Sunday, April 9, 1939, on the Lincoln Memorial steps in the capital. The event was featured in the documentary Marian Anderson: The Lincoln Memorial Concert. She sang before an integrated crowd of more than 75,000 people and a radio audience in the millions.

On January 7, 1955, Anderson became the first Black American singer to perform at the Metropolitan Opera. In addition, she worked as a delegate to the United Nations Human Rights Committee and as a Goodwill Ambassador for the United States Department of State, giving concerts all over the world. She participated in the civil rights movement in the 1960s, singing at the March on Washington for Jobs and Freedom in 1963. The recipient of numerous awards and honors, Anderson was awarded the first Presidential Medal of Freedom in 1963, the Congressional Gold Medal in 1977, the Kennedy Center Honors in 1978, the National Medal of Arts in 1986, and a Grammy Lifetime Achievement Award in 1991.

== Early life and education ==
Marian Anderson was born in Philadelphia on February 27, 1897, to John Berkley Anderson and Annie Delilah Rucker. Her father sold ice and coal at the Reading Terminal in downtown Philadelphia and eventually also sold liquor. Before her marriage, Anderson's mother was briefly a student at the Virginia Seminary and College in Lynchburg, and worked as a schoolteacher in Virginia. As she did not obtain a degree, Annie Anderson was unable to teach in Philadelphia under a law that was applied only to Black teachers and not white ones. She therefore earned an income caring for small children. Marian was the eldest of the three Anderson children. Her two sisters, Alyse (1899–1965) and Ethel (1902–90), also became singers. Ethel married James DePreist and their son James Anderson DePreist was a noted conductor.

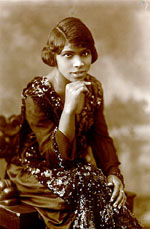
Anderson in 1920

Anderson's parents were both devout Christians and the whole family was active in the Union Baptist Church, which, during her youth, stood in a building constructed by the congregation in 1889 at 709 S. 12th Street in South Philadelphia. Marian's aunt Mary, her father's sister, was particularly active in the church's musical life and convinced her niece to join the junior church choir at the age of six. In that role, she got to perform solos and duets, often with her aunt. Aunt Mary took Marian to concerts at local churches, the YMCA, benefit concerts, and other community music events throughout the city. Anderson credited her aunt's influence as the reason she pursued her singing career. Beginning as young as six, her aunt arranged for Marian to sing for local functions where she was often paid 25 or 50 cents for singing a few songs. As she got into her early teens, Marian began to make as much as four or five dollars for singing, a considerable sum for the early 20th century. At the age of 10, Marian joined the People's Chorus of Philadelphia under the direction of singer Emma Azalia Hackley, where she was often a soloist.

When Anderson was 12, her father received a head injury while working at the Reading Terminal before Christmas 1909. Soon afterwards, her father died following heart failure. He was 37 years old. Marian and her family moved into the home of her father's parents, Benjamin and Isabella Anderson. Her grandfather had been born a slave and was emancipated in the 1860s. He relocated to South Philadelphia, the first person in his family to do so. When Anderson moved into his home, the two became very close, but he died just a year after the family moved there.

Anderson attended Stanton Grammar School, graduating in 1912. Although her family could not pay for any music lessons or high school, Anderson continued to perform wherever she could and learn from anyone willing to teach her. Throughout her teenage years, she remained active in her church's musical activities and was now involved heavily in the adult choir. She became a member of the Baptists' Young People's Union and the Camp Fire Girls, which provided her with some, though limited, musical opportunities. Eventually, the People's Chorus of Philadelphia and the pastor of her church, Reverend Wesley Parks, along with other leaders of the Black community, raised the money she needed to get singing lessons with Mary Saunders Patterson and to attend South Philadelphia High School, from which she graduated in 1921.. Anderson then applied to the Philadelphia Music Academy, which refused to admit her because of its all white policy.

Undaunted, Anderson pursued studies privately in her native city through the continued support of the Philadelphia Black community, first with Agnes Reifsnyder, then Giuseppe Boghetti. She met Boghetti through the principal of her high school. Anderson auditioned for him by singing "Deep River"; he was immediately brought to tears. Boghetti scheduled a recital of English, Russian, Italian and German music at The Town Hall in New York City in April 1924; it took place in an almost empty hall and received poor reviews.

In 1923, Anderson made her first recordings for the Victor Talking Machine Company in Camden, New Jersey.

== Early career ==
In 1925, Anderson got her first big break at a singing competition sponsored by the New York Philharmonic. As the winner, she performed in concert with the orchestra on August 26, 1925, a performance that scored immediate success with both the audience and music critics. Anderson continued her studies with Frank La Forge in New York. During this time, Arthur Judson, director of the New York Philharmonic, became her manager. Over the next several years, she made a number of concert appearances in the United States, but racial prejudice prevented her career from gaining momentum. In 1928, she made her first performance at Carnegie Hall.

=== Rosenwald Fund ===
During her fall 1929 concert schedule, Anderson sang at Orchestra Hall in Chicago, for which she received measured praise. Critic Herman Devries from the Chicago Evening American wrote, "[Anderson] reached near perfection in every requirement of vocal art—the tone was of superb timbre, the phrasing of utmost refinement, the style pure, discreet, musicianly. But after this there was a letdown, and we took away the impression of a talent still unripe, but certainly a talent of potential growth." In the audience were two representatives from Julius Rosenwald's philanthropic organization, the Rosenwald Fund. The organization's representatives, Ray Field and George Arthur, encouraged Anderson to apply for a Rosenwald Fellowship, from which she received $1500 to study in Berlin.

=== European tours ===
Anderson went to Europe, where she spent a number of months studying with Sara Charles-Cahier and Geni Sadero before launching a highly successful European singing tour. In the summer of 1930, she went to Scandinavia, where she met the Finnish pianist Kosti Vehanen, who became her regular accompanist and her vocal coach for many years. She also met Jean Sibelius through Vehanen after he had heard her in a concert in Helsinki. Moved by her performance, Sibelius invited them to his home and asked his wife to serve champagne in place of the traditional coffee. Sibelius complimented Anderson on her performance; he felt that she had been able to penetrate the Nordic soul. The two struck up an immediate friendship, which further blossomed into a professional partnership, and for many years Sibelius altered and composed songs for Anderson. He created a new arrangement of the song "Solitude" and dedicated it to Anderson in 1939. Originally The Jewish Girl's Song from his 1906 incidental music to Belshazzar's Feast, it later became the "Solitude" section of the orchestral suite derived from the incidental music.

In 1933, Anderson made her European debut in a concert at Wigmore Hall in London, where she was received enthusiastically. In the first years of the 1930s, she toured Europe, where she did not encounter the prejudices she had experienced in America. Anderson, accompanied by Vehanen, continued to tour throughout Europe during the mid-1930s. Before going back to Scandinavia, where fans had "Marian fever", she performed in Russia and the major cities of Eastern Europe. She became a favorite of many conductors and composers of major European orchestras quickly. During a 1935 tour in Salzburg, the conductor Arturo Toscanini told her she had a voice "heard once in a hundred years."

=== American tours ===
In 1934, impresario Sol Hurok offered Anderson a contract with more favorable terms than she had with Arthur Judson. Hurok became her manager and persuaded her to return to America to perform. In 1935, Anderson made her second recital appearance at The Town Hall, New York City, which received highly favorable reviews from music critics. She spent the next four years touring throughout the United States and Europe. She was offered opera roles by several European houses, but Anderson declined all of them due to her lack of acting experience. She did, however, record a number of arias in the studio, which became bestsellers.

Anderson's accomplishments as a singer did not make her immune to the Jim Crow laws in the 1930s. Although she gave approximately seventy recitals a year in the United States, Anderson was still turned away by some American hotels and restaurants. In the midst of this discrimination, Albert Einstein, a champion of racial tolerance, hosted Anderson on many occasions, the first being in 1937 when she was denied a hotel room while performing at Princeton University. Einstein's first hosting of Anderson became the subject of a play, "My Lord, What a Night", in 2021. She last stayed with him months before he died in 1955.

=== DAR and the 1939 Lincoln Memorial concert ===
External audio
- Anderson performing at the Lincoln Memorial in 1939

In 1939, Sarah Corbin Robert, president general of the Daughters of the American Revolution (DAR) denied permission to Anderson for a concert on April 9 at DAR Constitution Hall under a white performers-only policy in effect at the time. In addition to the policy on performers, Washington, DC, was a segregated city, and Black patrons were upset that they would have to sit at the back of Constitution Hall. Furthermore, Constitution Hall did not have the segregated public bathrooms then required by DC law for such events. Other DC venues were not an option: for example, the District of Columbia Board of Education declined a request for the use of the auditorium of Central High School, a white public high school.

The next day, Charles Edward Russell, a co-founder of the National Association for the Advancement of Colored People (NAACP) and chair of the DC citywide Inter-Racial Committee, held a meeting of the Marian Anderson Citizens Committee (MACC). This included the National Negro Congress, the Brotherhood of Sleeping Car Porters, the American Federation of Labor, and the Washington Industrial Council-CIO, church leaders and activists in the city, and numerous other organizations. MACC elected Charles Hamilton Houston as its chairman and on February 20, the group picketed the Board of Education, collected signatures on petitions, and planned a mass protest at the next board meeting.

In the ensuing furor, thousands of DAR members, including First Lady Eleanor Roosevelt, resigned from the organization. Roosevelt wrote to the DAR: "I am in complete disagreement with the attitude taken in refusing Constitution Hall to a great artist ... You had an opportunity to lead in an enlightened way and it seems to me that your organization has failed."

Black American novelist Zora Neale Hurston, however, criticized Roosevelt's failure to condemn the simultaneous decision of the Board of Education of the District of Columbia, now the District of Columbia State Board of Education, to exclude Anderson from singing at the segregated white Central High School. Hurston declared "to jump the people responsible for racial bias would be to accuse and expose the accusers themselves. The District of Columbia has no home rule; it is controlled by congressional committees, and Congress at the time was overwhelmingly Democratic. It was controlled by the very people who were screaming so loudly against the DAR. To my way of thinking, both places should have been denounced, or neither."

As the controversy grew, the American press overwhelmingly supported Anderson's right to sing. The Philadelphia Tribune wrote, "A group of tottering old ladies, who don't know the difference between patriotism and putridism, have compelled the gracious First Lady to apologize for their national rudeness." The Richmond Times-Dispatch wrote, "In these days of racial intolerance so crudely expressed in the Third Reich, an action such as the D.A.R.'s ban ... seems all the more deplorable." With the support of Eleanor Roosevelt, President Roosevelt and Walter White, then-executive secretary of the NAACP, and Anderson's manager, Sol Hurok, persuaded Secretary of the Interior Harold L. Ickes to arrange an open-air concert on the steps of the Lincoln Memorial. The concert was performed on Easter Sunday, April 9. Anderson was accompanied, as usual, by Vehanen. They began the performance with a dignified and stirring rendition of "My Country, 'Tis of Thee". The event attracted a crowd of more than 75,000 in addition to a national radio audience of millions.

Two months later, in conjunction with the 30th NAACP conference in Richmond, Virginia, Eleanor Roosevelt gave a speech on national radio (NBC and CBS) and presented Anderson with the 1939 Spingarn Medal for distinguished achievement. In 2001, a documentary film of the concert was chosen for the National Film Registry, and in 2008, NBC radio coverage of the event was selected for the National Recording Registry.

The DAR later apologized to Anderson and she went on to perform at Constitution Hall in 1943, 1953, 1956, 1960, and 1964. First Lady Roosevelt returned to the Hall to watch the first of Anderson's performances there on January 7, 1943.

Newsreel footage of Anderson's concert at the Lincoln Memorial

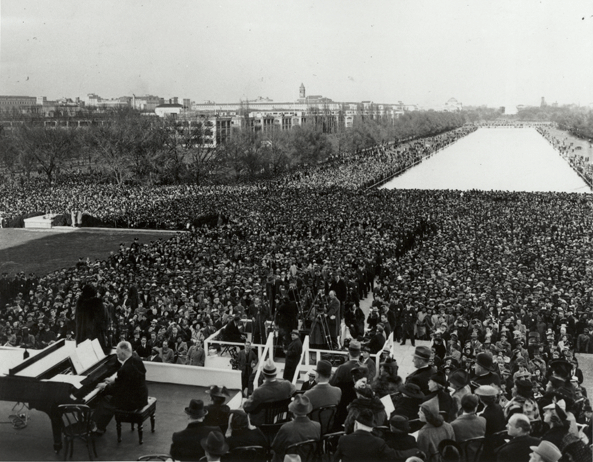
Lincoln Memorial concert, April 9, 1939

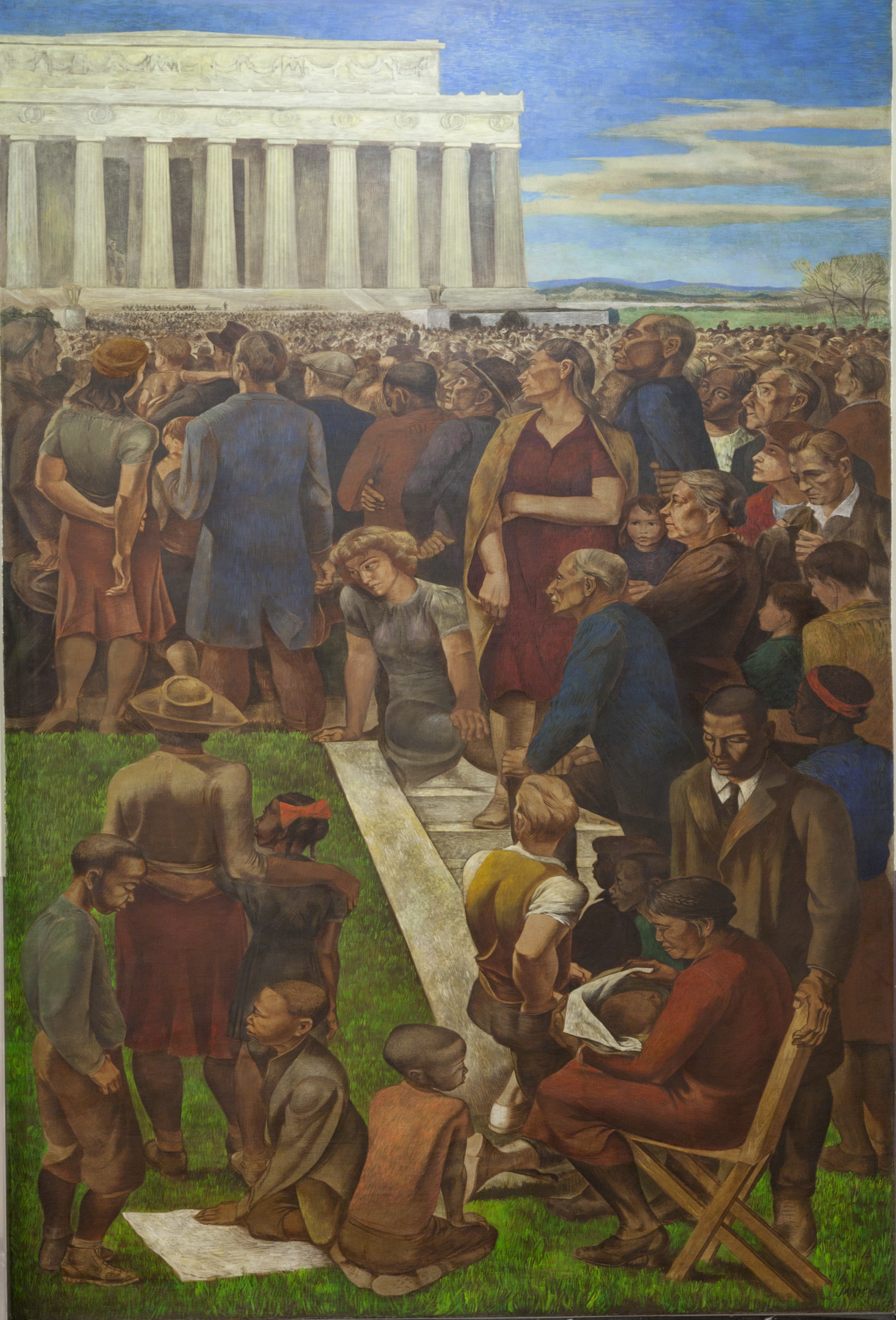
Mitchell Jamieson's 1943 mural An Incident in Contemporary American Life, at the United States Department of the Interior Building, depicting the scene

== Mid-career ==
Gustav Mahler's Kindertotenlieder
1. "Nun will die Sonn' so hell aufgehn" (4:40)

2. "Nun seh' ich wohl, warum so dunkle Flammen" (3:58)

3. "Wenn dein Mütterlein" (4:12)

"4. "Oft denk' ich, sie sind nur ausgegangen" (3:03)

5. "In diesem Wetter, in diesem Braus" (6:11)
Anderson with the San Francisco Symphony, conducted by Pierre Monteux (1950)

External audio
- Anderson performing with Dimitri Mitropoulos at Lewisohn Stadium in 1952

During World War II and the Korean War, Anderson entertained troops in hospitals and at bases. In 1943, she sang at the Constitution Hall, having been invited by the DAR to perform before an integrated audience as part of a benefit for the American Red Cross. She said of the event, "When I finally walked onto the stage of Constitution Hall, I felt no different than I had in other halls. There was no sense of triumph. I felt that it was a beautiful concert hall and I was very happy to sing there." In contrast, the District of Columbia Board of Education continued to bar her from using the high school auditorium in the District of Columbia.

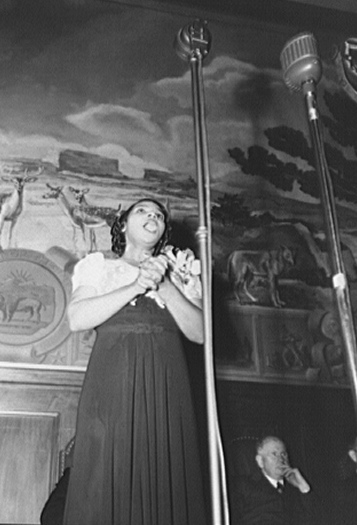
Anderson at the Department of the Interior in 1943, commemorating her 1939 concert

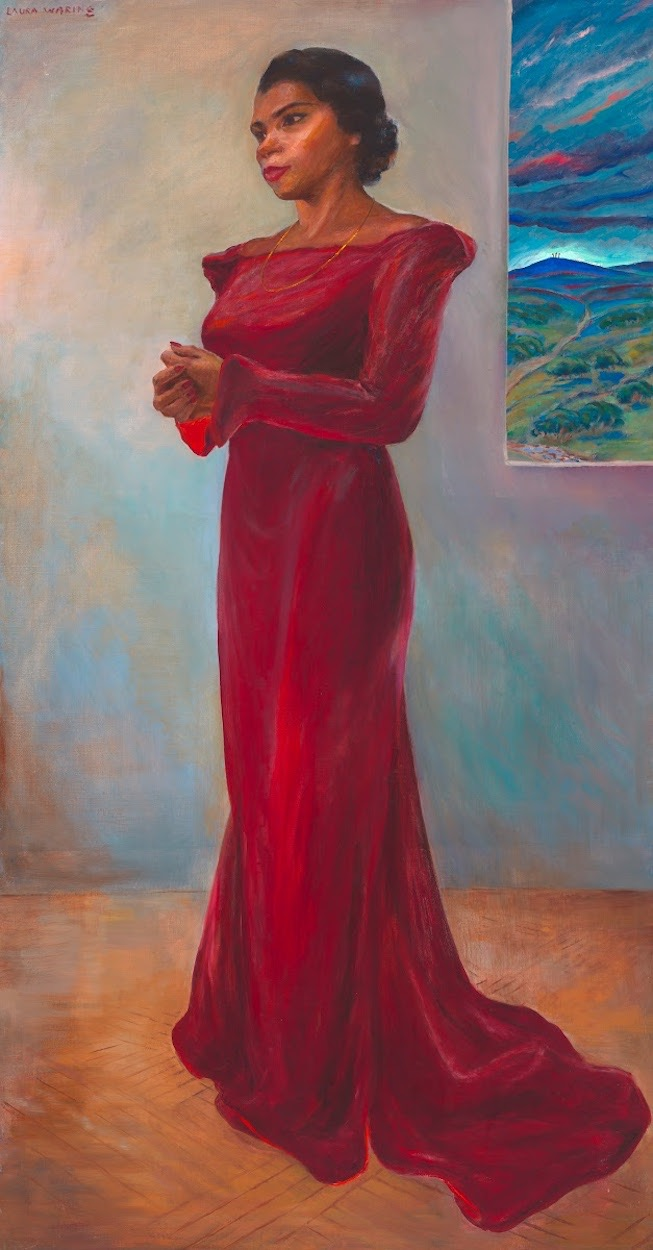
Portrait of Marian Anderson by Laura Wheeler Waring (1944).

=== Ford 50th Anniversary Show ===
On June 15, 1953, Anderson headlined The Ford 50th Anniversary Show, which was broadcast live from New York City on both NBC and CBS. Midway through the program, she sang "He's Got the Whole World in His Hands". She returned to close the program with her rendition of the "Battle Hymn of the Republic". The program attracted an audience of 60 million viewers. Forty years after the broadcast, television critic Tom Shales recalled the broadcast as both "a landmark in television" and "a milestone in the cultural life of the '50s".

=== The Metropolitan Opera ===
On January 7, 1955, Anderson became the first Black American to sing with the Metropolitan Opera in New York. At the invitation of director Rudolf Bing, she sang the part of Ulrica in Giuseppe Verdi's Un ballo in maschera (opposite Zinka Milanov, then Herva Nelli, as Amelia). Anderson later said about the evening, "The curtain rose on the second scene and I was there on stage, mixing the witch's brew. I trembled, and when the audience applauded and applauded before I could sing a note, I felt myself tightening into a knot." Although she never appeared with the company again, Anderson was named a permanent member of the Metropolitan Opera company. The following year, her autobiography, My Lord, What a Morning, was published, and became a bestseller.

=== Presidential inaugurations and goodwill ambassador tours ===
In 1957, she sang for President Dwight D. Eisenhower's inauguration, and toured India and the Far East as a goodwill ambassador through the U.S. State Department and the American National Theater and Academy. She traveled 35,000 miles (56,000 km) in 12 weeks, giving 24 concerts. After that, President Eisenhower appointed her a delegate to the United Nations Human Rights Committee. The same year, she was elected Fellow of the American Academy of Arts and Sciences. In 1958, she was officially designated a delegate to the United Nations, a formalization of her role as "goodwill ambassadress" of the U.S.

On January 20, 1961, she sang for President John F. Kennedy's inauguration, and in 1962 she performed for President Kennedy and other dignitaries in the East Room of the White House and toured Australia. She was active in supporting the civil rights movement during the 1960s. She performed benefit concerts in aid of the America-Israel Cultural Foundation, the National Association for the Advancement of Colored People and the Congress of Racial Equality. In 1963, she sang at the March on Washington for Jobs and Freedom. That same year, she received one of the newly reinstituted Presidential Medal of Freedom, which is awarded for "especially meritorious contributions to the security or national interest of the United States, World Peace or cultural or other significant public or private endeavors." She also released an album, Snoopycat: The Adventures of Marian Anderson's Cat Snoopy, which included short stories and songs about her beloved black cat. That same year, Anderson concluded her farewell tour, after which she retired from public performance. The international tour began at Constitution Hall on Saturday October 24, 1964, and ended on April 18, 1965, at Carnegie Hall. In 1965, she christened the nuclear-powered ballistic-missile submarine USS George Washington Carver.

== Later life ==
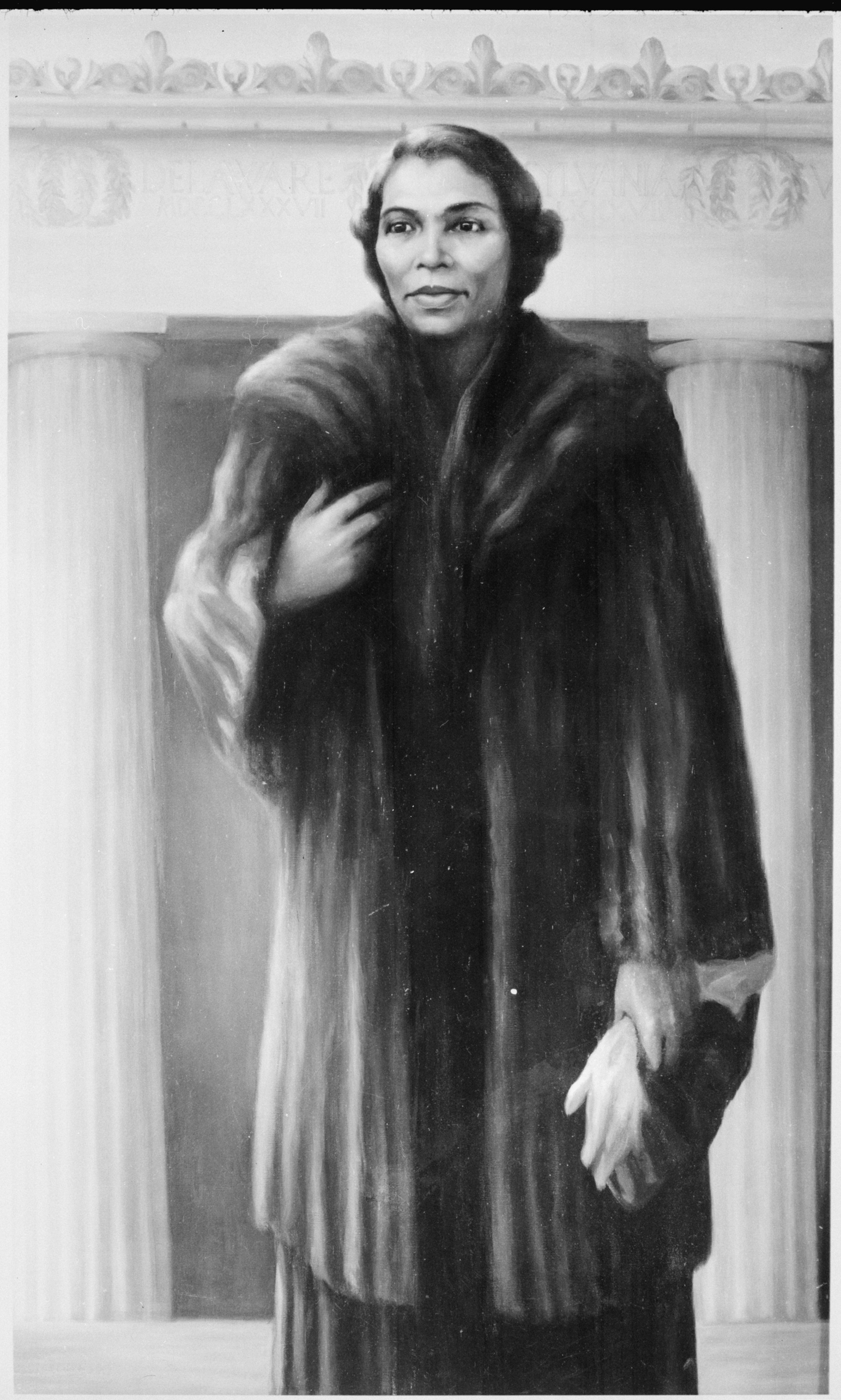
Painting by Betsy Graves Reyneau

Although Anderson retired from singing in 1965, she continued to appear publicly. She often narrated Aaron Copland's Lincoln Portrait, with her nephew James DePriest conducting. In 1976, Copland conducted a performance with the Philadelphia Orchestra at Saratoga. Her achievements were recognized with many honors, including the University of Pennsylvania Glee Club Award of Merit in 1973; the United Nations Peace Prize, New York City's Handel Medallion, and the Congressional Gold Medal, all in 1977; Kennedy Center Honors in 1978; the George Peabody Medal in 1981; the National Medal of Arts in 1986; and a Grammy Award for Lifetime Achievement in 1991. A half-ounce gold commemorative medal was embossed with her portrait by the United States Treasury Department in 1980. Four years later, she was the first person to be honored with the Eleanor Roosevelt Human Rights Award of the City of New York. She was awarded 24 honorary doctoral degrees, by Howard University, Temple University, Smith College, Saint Mary's College and many other colleges and universities.

== Personal life ==
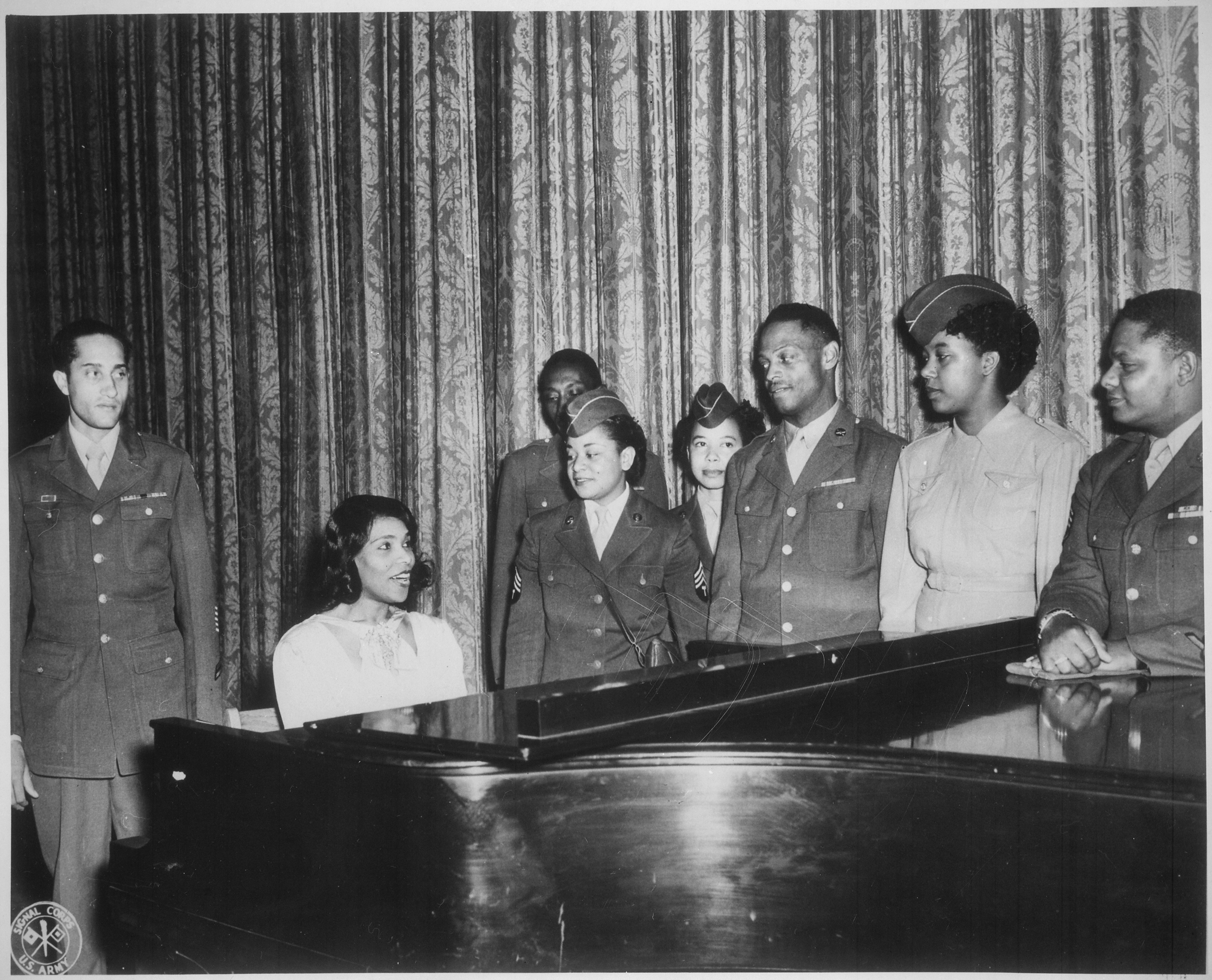
Anderson entertains a group of overseas veterans and WACs on the stage of the San Antonio Municipal Auditorium, 1945.

On July 17, 1943, Anderson became the second wife of architect Orpheus H. "King" Fisher in Bethel, Connecticut. Fisher had asked her to marry him when they were teenagers, but she declined at that time because she feared it would have forestalled her music career. The wedding was a private ceremony performed by United Methodist pastor Rev. Jack Grenfell and was the subject of a short story titled "The 'Inside' Story", written by Rev. Grenfell's wife, Dr. Clarine Coffin Grenfell, in her book Women My Husband Married, including Marian Anderson. According to Dr. Grenfell, the wedding was originally supposed to take place in the parsonage, but because of a bake sale on the lawn of the Bethel United Methodist Church, the ceremony was moved at the last minute to the Elmwood Chapel, on the site of the Elmwood Cemetery in Bethel, in order to keep the event private.

By this marriage she gained a stepson, James Fisher, from her husband's previous marriage to Ida Gould, a white woman.

In 1940, seeking a retreat away from the public eye, Anderson and Fisher purchased a three-story Victorian farmhouse on a 100-acre (40 ha) farm in Danbury, Connecticut, after an exhaustive search throughout New York, New Jersey, and Connecticut. Through the years, he built many structures on the property, including an acoustic rehearsal studio he designed for his wife. The property remained Anderson's home for almost 50 years.

From 1943, she resided at the farm that Orpheus had named Marianna Farm. The farm was on Joe's Hill Road, in the Mill Plain section of western Danbury. She constructed a three-bedroom ranch house as a residence, and she used a separate one-room structure as her studio. In 1996, the farm was named one of 60 sites on the Connecticut Freedom Trail. The studio was moved to downtown Danbury as the Marian Anderson studio.

As a town resident, Anderson wished to live as normally as possible, declining offers to be treated in restaurants and stores as a celebrity. She was known to visit the Danbury State Fair and sang at the city hall on the occasion of the lighting of Christmas ornaments. She gave a concert at the Danbury High School, served on the board of the Danbury Music Center, and supported the Charles Ives Center for the Arts and the Danbury Chapter of the NAACP.

In 1986, Orpheus Fisher died after 43 years of marriage. Anderson remained in residence at Marianna Farm until 1992, one year before her death. Although the property was sold to developers, various preservationists as well as the City of Danbury fought to protect Anderson's studio. Their efforts proved successful, and the Danbury Museum and Historical Society received a grant from the state of Connecticut, relocated and restored the structure, and opened it to the public in 2004. In addition to seeing the studio, visitors can see photographs and memorabilia from milestones in Anderson's career.

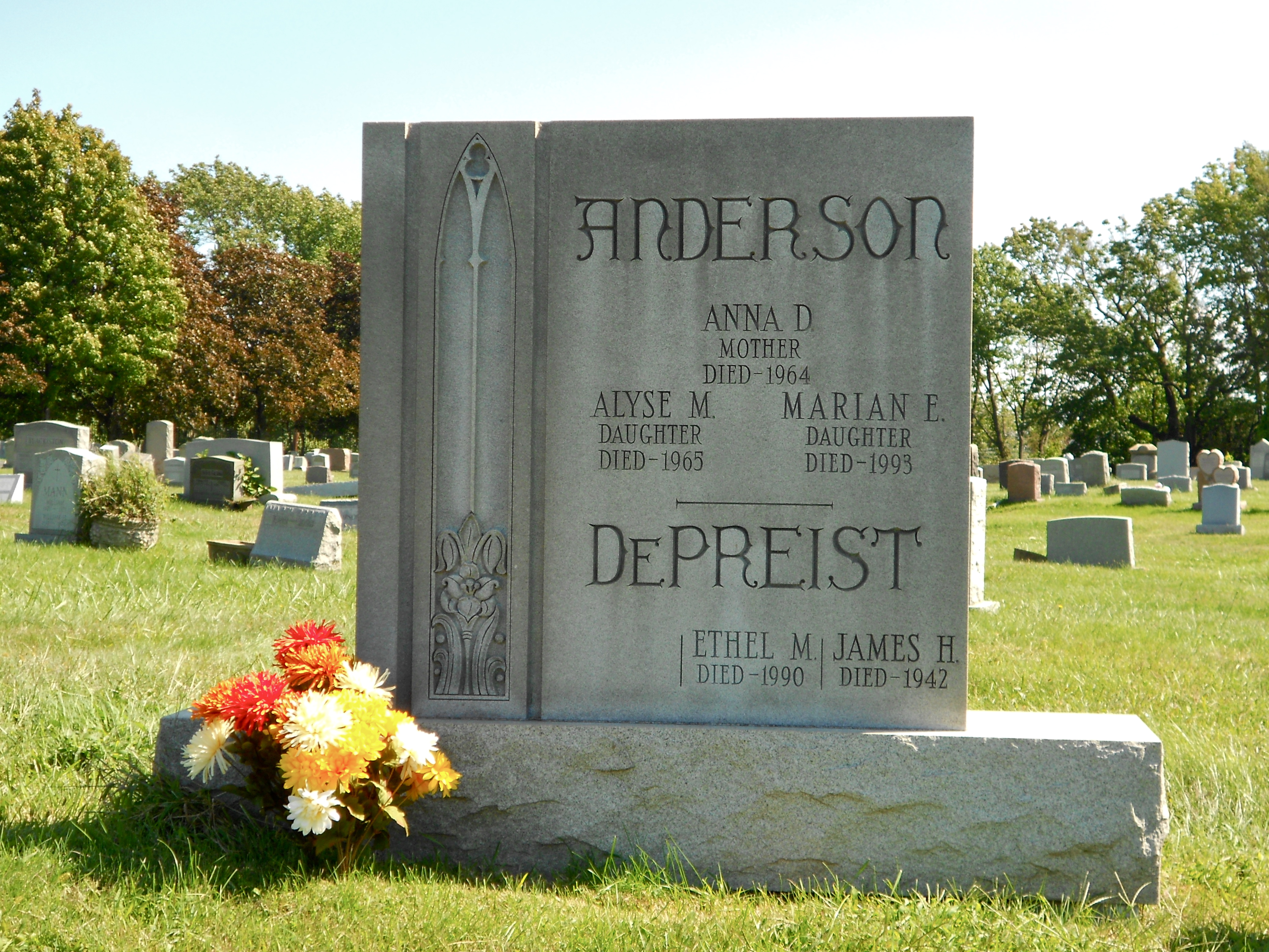
Marian Anderson gravestone in Eden Cemetery

In 1992, Anderson relocated to the home of her nephew, conductor James DePreist, in Portland, Oregon. She died there on April 8, 1993, of congestive heart failure, at the age of 96. She is interred at Eden Cemetery, in Collingdale, Pennsylvania.

== Awards and honors ==
External audio
- Anderson performing Brahms' Alto Rhapsody with Pierre Monteux conducting the San Francisco Symphony in 1945

- 1939: NAACP Spingarn Medal
- 1963: Presidential Medal of Freedom
- 1973: University of Pennsylvania Glee Club Award of Merit
- 1973: National Women's Hall of Fame
- 1977: United Nations Peace Prize
- 1977: New York City – Handel Medallion
- 1977: Congressional Gold Medal
- 1978: Kennedy Center Honors
- 1980: United States Treasury Department gold commemorative medal
- 1984: Eleanor Roosevelt Human Rights Award of the City of New York
- 1986: National Medal of Arts
- 1991: Grammy Lifetime Achievement Award
- Honorary doctorate from Howard University, Temple University, Smith College, and many other institutions
- 1998: American Classical Music Hall of Fame

== Legacy ==
The life and art of Anderson has been commemorated by writers, artists, and city, state, and national organizations. The following is a selected list:

- She was an example and an inspiration to both Leontyne Price and Jessye Norman.
- 1948: The anthology radio drama Destination Freedom recapped her earlier life in the episode "Choir Girl from Philadelphia".
- 1976: Among the historical figures featured in the artwork Our Nation's 200th Birthday, The Telephone's 100th Birthday by Stanley Meltzoff for Bell System.
- 1999: A one-act musical play entitled My Lord, What a Morning: The Marian Anderson Story was produced by the Kennedy Center. The musical took its title from Anderson's memoir, published by Viking in 1956.
- 2001: The 1939 documentary film, Marian Anderson: The Lincoln Memorial Concert was selected for preservation in the United States National Film Registry by the Library of Congress as being "culturally, historically, or aesthetically significant."
- 2002: Molefi Kete Asante included Anderson in his book,100 Greatest African Americans.
- 2005: U.S. postage stamp honored Anderson as part of the Black Heritage series. Anderson is also pictured on the US$5,000 Series I United States Savings Bond.
- 2008: A BBC Radio 4 documentary, Freedom Song produced by Ekene Akalawu, was first broadcast on January 24, 2008.
- 2008: American band director, Captain Kenneth R. Force, USMS, in an interview listed Anderson as a defining influence from his childhood.
- 2011: The Marian Anderson House, in Philadelphia, was added to the National Register of Historic Places.
- 2016: The Union Baptist Church (Built 1915–16), 1910 Fitzwater Street, Philadelphia, PA, was added to the Philadelphia Register of Historic Places, under Criteria A and J, the former being for its association with Marian Anderson, providing regulatory protection to the building from alteration and demolition.
- 2016: Jack Lew announced that Anderson would appear along with Eleanor Roosevelt and Martin Luther King Jr. on the back of the redesigned US$5 bill scheduled to be unveiled in the year 2020, the 100th anniversary of 19th Amendment of the Constitution that granted women in America the right to vote.
- 2019: Anderson was profiled in the National Portrait Gallery’s One Life: Marian Anderson.
- 2021: Anderson's life and the 1939 Constitution Hall controversy and her subsequent concert at the Lincoln Memorial were the subject of a documentary, Voice of Freedom, that aired as an episode of American Experience on PBS.
- London, England, has a pub called The Marian Anderson, on Bowling Green Lane, Clerkenwell, London EC1R 0BJ.
- 2024: On June 8, Verizon Hall at the Kimmel Center for the Performing Arts was renamed Marian Anderson Hall in her honor.

== Marian Anderson Award ==
Anderson established the Marian Anderson Award in 1943 after she was awarded The Philadelphia Award in 1940, which included $25,000 in prize money (equivalent to $574,525 in 2025). Anderson used the money to establish a singing competition to help support young singers. The prize fund was exhausted in due course and disbanded in 1976. In 1990, the award was re-established and issued annually up to 2019, when the last award was granted to Kool & the Gang.

In 1998, the Marian Anderson Award prize money was restructured to be given to an established artist, not necessarily a singer, who exhibits leadership in a humanitarian area.

In 2022, the Award moved from a private operation to a program administered by Play On Philly, a classical music education organization aimed at local youth. Instead of an annual award ceremony, the funds were used to create the Marian Anderson Young Artist Program, a tuition-free program with a mission to "serve those individuals whose communities have historically been excluded from the highest levels of musical excellence due to structural barriers in our country."

== Biography and biographical entries ==
- Tommasini, Anthony (2026). Voice of a Century: The Life and Artistry of Marian Anderson. New York: Penguin. ISBN 978-0-593-65267-1.
- FemBio, "Marian Anderson"
- Hamilton, David (1987). The Metropolitan Opera Encyclopedia: A Comprehensive Guide to the World of Opera. New York, London, Toronto, Sydney, Tokyo: Simon and Schuster, p. 22. ISBN 0-671-61732-X.
- Hamilton, Mary (1990). A–Z of Opera. New York, Oxford, Sydney: Facts On File, p. 17. ISBN 0-8160-2340-9.
- Higginbotham, Carlton (1998), "Marian Anderson (1897-1993)".
- Kennedy Center, "Biography of Marian Anderson"
- Rosenthal, Harold, and John Warrack (1979, 2nd ed.). The Concise Oxford Dictionary of Opera. London, New York and Melbourne: Oxford University Press, p. 11. ISBN 0-19-311318-X.
- Sadie, Stanley, and Christina Bashford (1992). The New Grove Dictionary of Opera. London: Macmillan Publishers Ltd. Vol. 1, p. 123. ISBN 0-935859-92-6.
- Sadie, Stanley, and John Tyrrell. (2001).The New Grove Dictionary of Music and Musicians. London: Macmillan Publishers Ltd. Vol. 1, p. 615. ISBN 0-333-60800-3.
- Virtual Museum of History, "Marian Anderson"
- Warrack, John, and Ewan West (1996). The Concise Oxford Dictionary of Opera (3rd ed.). New York: Oxford University Press, p. 13. ISBN 0-19-280028-0.

== Selected discography ==
- Marian Anderson at AllMusic
- Marian Anderson discography at Discogs
- Marian Anderson on Discography of American Historical Recordings
- Marian Anderson: Biography and Bach Cantatas Recordings on Bach Cantatas

== See also ==
- List of African-American firsts
- List of rallies and protest marches in Washington, D.C.
- Marian Anderson House

== Bibliography ==
- Arsenault, Raymond, The Sound of Freedom: Marian Anderson, the Lincoln Memorial, and the Concert that Awakened America. Bloomsbury Publishing, 2009. ISBN 978-1-59691-578-7.
- Freedman, Russell, The Voice that Challenged a Nation: Marian Anderson and the Struggle for Equal Rights. New York: Clarion Books, 2004. ISBN 978-0-618-15976-5.
- Sims-Wood, Janet L, Marian Anderson: An Annotated Bibliography and Discography. Connecticut: Greenwood Press, 1981. ISBN 978-0-313-22559-8.
- Steane, J. B. (1996). Singers of the Century. London: Amadeus Press. pp. 46–50. ISBN 978-1-57467-009-7.
- Story, Rosalyn (1993). And So I Sing: African American Divas of Opera and Concert. New York: Amistad Press. ISBN 978-1-56743-011-0.
- Vehanen, Kosti (2018) [1941]. Marian Anderson: A Portrait. New York: Forgotten Books. ISBN 978-0-8371-4051-3.
