= Bethel United Methodist Church (Bethel, Connecticut) =

Church in Bethel, Connecticut, United States

Coordinates: 41.371270°N 73.412204°W

Bethel United Methodist Church is a United Methodist Church located on Greenwood Avenue in Bethel, Connecticut. The church building was dedicated in 1861. The church parsonage is on Governor’s Lane in Bethel. The pastor is Pastor John Parille.

== History ==
In 1848, the church founders organized the building of the first permanent meeting hall and the appointment of the first full-time minister for what would later be known as the Bethel United Methodist Church. In 1860, work began on the present structure, which was completed and dedicated in 1861. The church building was restored after a fire in 1884 caused significant damage. Another major renovation took place in 1943.

Former pastors include Rev. Levi Percy (first pastor, 1847–48), Rev. Jack Grenfell (who performed the wedding ceremony for Marian Anderson while serving the Bethel United Methodist Church), and Rev. Robert Johnson (the longest serving, 1968–2001).

Randall-Wright Hall, which serves as the church school known as the Village Pre-School, was built in 1943. An adjacent building, now known as the Johnson Building in honor of Rev. Robert Johnson, was purchased in 1997 in order to secure additional parking for the church.
