= Jillian Patricia Pirtle =

American soprano and non-profit executive

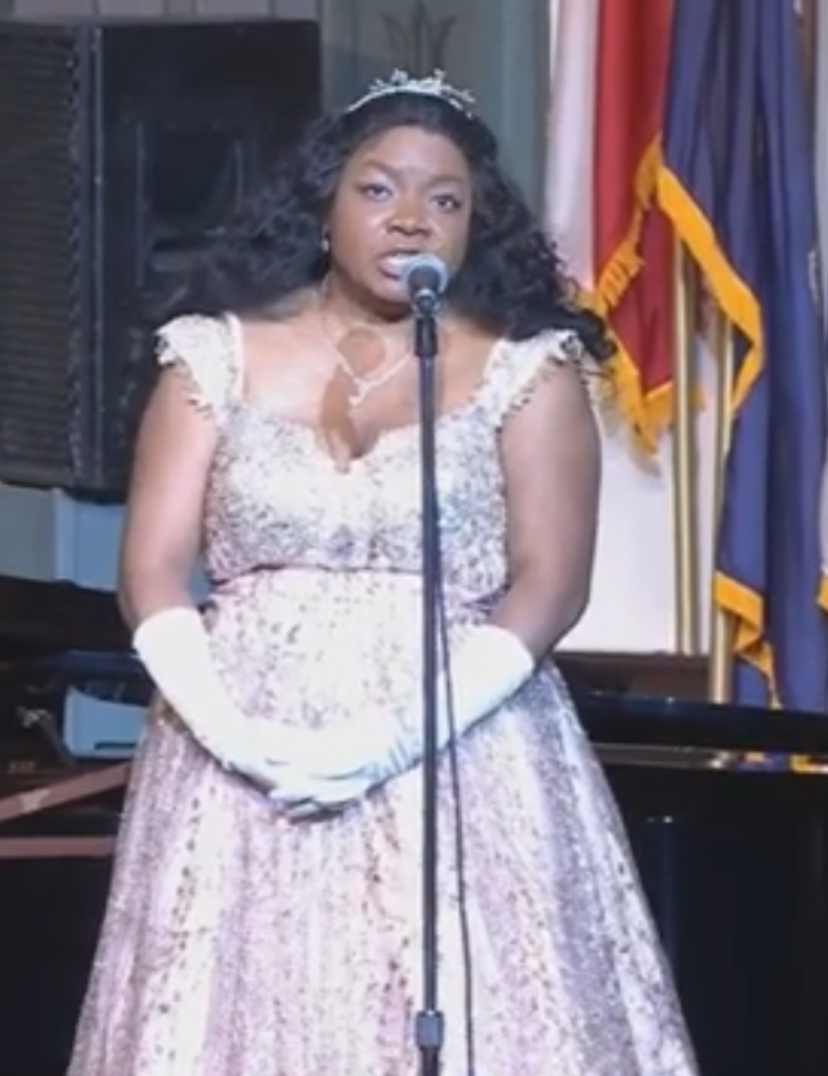
- Pirtle performing at DAR Constitution Hall in 2023.
- Born: 1983 (age 42–43)
- Education: University of the Arts (BFA, BA)
- Occupations: singer, nonprofit executive, historian
- Beauty pageant titleholder
- Title: Miss Pennsylvania Royal Dynasty 2013; Miss Pennsylvania Essence 2012; Miss Black Pennsylvania USA 2011
- Hair color: Black
- Eye color: Brown
- Major competitions: Miss Black Pennsylvania USA (Winner); Miss Black USA 2012
- Website: jillianpatriciapirtle.com

Jillian Patricia Pirtle (born 1983) is an American soprano, historian, nonprofit executive, and former beauty pageant winner. She won the title of Miss Black Pennsylvania USA 2011 and went on to compete in the Miss Black USA Pageant. Pirtle is the CEO of the Marian Anderson Museum and Historical Society in Philadelphia.

== Early life and education ==
Pirtle was born in 1983. She studied vocal music performance, instrumental violin, and dramatic performance at the Philadelphia High School for the Creative and Performing Arts. In 2004, she graduated from the University of the Arts, where she was a Marian Anderson Scholar and Classical Vocalist, with a bachelor of fine arts degree in musical theater and operatic performance. She also earned a bachelor of arts degree in history and was certified as a licensed historian in Pennsylvania.

== Career ==
=== Pageants ===
Pirtle competed in, and won, the beauty pageant Miss Black Pennsylvania USA 2011 and went on to compete in the Miss Black USA Pageant, winning two national titles. She was officially congratulated for winning Miss Black Pennsylvania USA by the Pennsylvania General Assembly's 2011 Pennsylvania House of Representatives Resolution No.66. She went on to win Miss Pennsylvania Essence 2012, Miss Pennsylvania Royal Dynasty 2013, and Miss International Supreme Queen.

=== Performing arts ===
She is a soprano and has performed at various events in Philadelphia. Pirtle has performed in operas, plays, and musicals including Porgy and Bess, La bohème, Gianni Scicci, Thoroughly Modern Millie, Hair, The Mikado, Little Shop of Horrors, and Love's Labour's Lost, and Funny House of a Negro.

She portrayed herself in the 2019 drama television series Voice of Majesty.

On June 26, 2023, Pirtle performed at the 132nd Continental Congress of the National Society Daughters of the American Revolution at DAR Constitution Hall in Washington, D.C. She was presented with a certificate in gratitude for her performance by President General Pamela Rouse Wright.

=== Nonprofit ===
Pirtle is the chief executive officer of the Marian Anderson Museum and Historical Society. She succeeded Blanche Burton-Lyles in the role. Following over $500,000 in flood damages that resulted after a basement pipe burst at the museum in 2020, Pirtle secured donations from private donors, the Preservation Alliance of Greater Philadelphia, and the Daughters of the American Revolution to assist in covering the costs.

In 2023, she was featured on the podcast The Visible Voices. In November 2023, she was a panelist at Equity in Action.

In March 2024, Pirtle organized the Faith, Music and Community event as a collaboration between the Marian Anderson Museum and Tindley Temple United Methodist Church.

In September 2024, she spoke on the panel Restoring Black Heritage Sites: Challenges and Opportunities, that the Preservation Alliance for Greater Philadelphia held at the Cosmopolitan Club of Philadelphia in Center City.

== Filmography ==
Year	Title	Role	Notes
2019	Voice of Majesty	Herself	4 episodes
