= McCook Family Estate =

Historic house in Pennsylvania, United States

- U.S. National Register of Historic Places
- Pittsburgh Landmark – PHLF
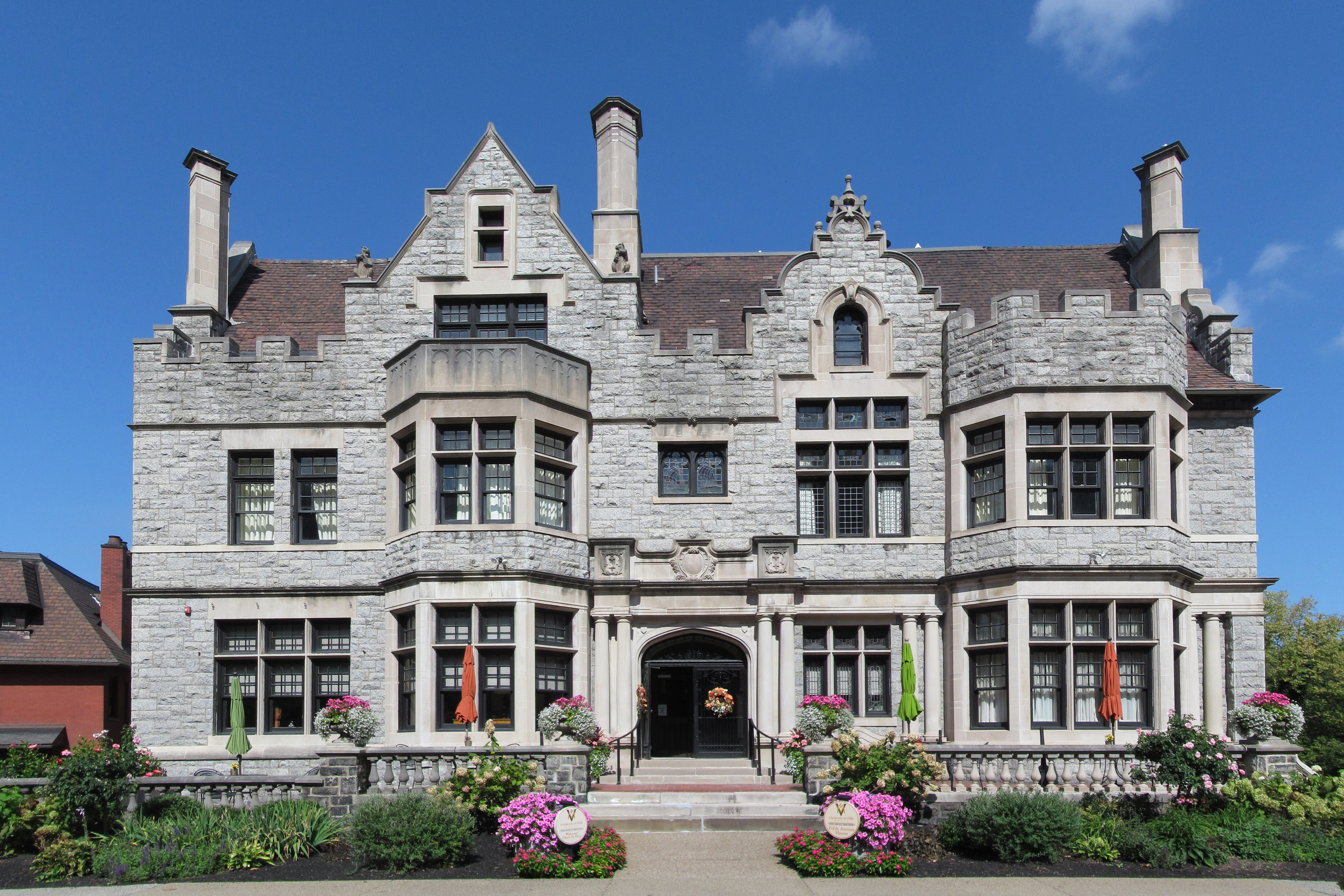
- The house in 2021

- Location within Pittsburgh Location within Pennsylvania Location within the United States
- Location: 5105 Fifth Avenue, Pittsburgh, Pennsylvania
- Coordinates: 40°26′52.86″N 79°56′17.95″W
- Built: 1906 and 1907
- Architect: Carpenter & Crocker
- Architectural style: Jacobean Revival
- NRHP reference No.: 11000197

Significant dates
- Added to NRHP: April 20, 2011
- Designated PHLF: 2009

The McCook Family Estate (also known as the Willis McCook House) is a historic mansion located at 5105 Fifth Avenue in the Shadyside neighborhood of Pittsburgh, Pennsylvania, USA. It was built during 1906 and 1907 for Willis McCook and his family. McCook was a prominent businessman and lawyer who represented Henry Clay Frick.

== History and architectural features ==
An extensive renovation of the house was completed in 2012, when it opened as a boutique hotel called the "Mansions on Fifth Hotel". It is a member of Historic Hotels of America, the official program of the National Trust for Historic Preservation.

=== Placement of this property on local and national historic registries ===
The house was added to the list of Pittsburgh History and Landmarks Foundation Historic Landmarks in 2009.

The nomination materials for placement of the McCook Family Estate on the National Register of Historic Places were reviewed by Pennsylvania's Historic Preservation Board on February 1, 2011, at 9:45 a.m. at the Labor and Industry Building in Harrisburg, Pennsylvania. Also considered for National Register placement at this meeting were: the Robb Farm in Huntingdon County, the John A. Brashear House and Factory in Pittsburgh, the Montrose Historic District in Susquehanna County, the Quakertown Historic District in Bucks County, Wilpen Hall in Sewickley, the Alden Villa in Lebanon County, and the Tindley Temple United Methodist Church and Marian Anderson House in Philadelphia, as well as multiple historic African American churches in Philadelphia that were presented together on a "Multiple Property Documentation Form."

The historic residence and its eight-acre property were then officially added to the National Register of Historic Places on April 20, 2011.
