= Montrose Historic District (Montrose, Pennsylvania) =

Historic district in Pennsylvania, United States

- U.S. National Register of Historic Places
- U.S. Historic district
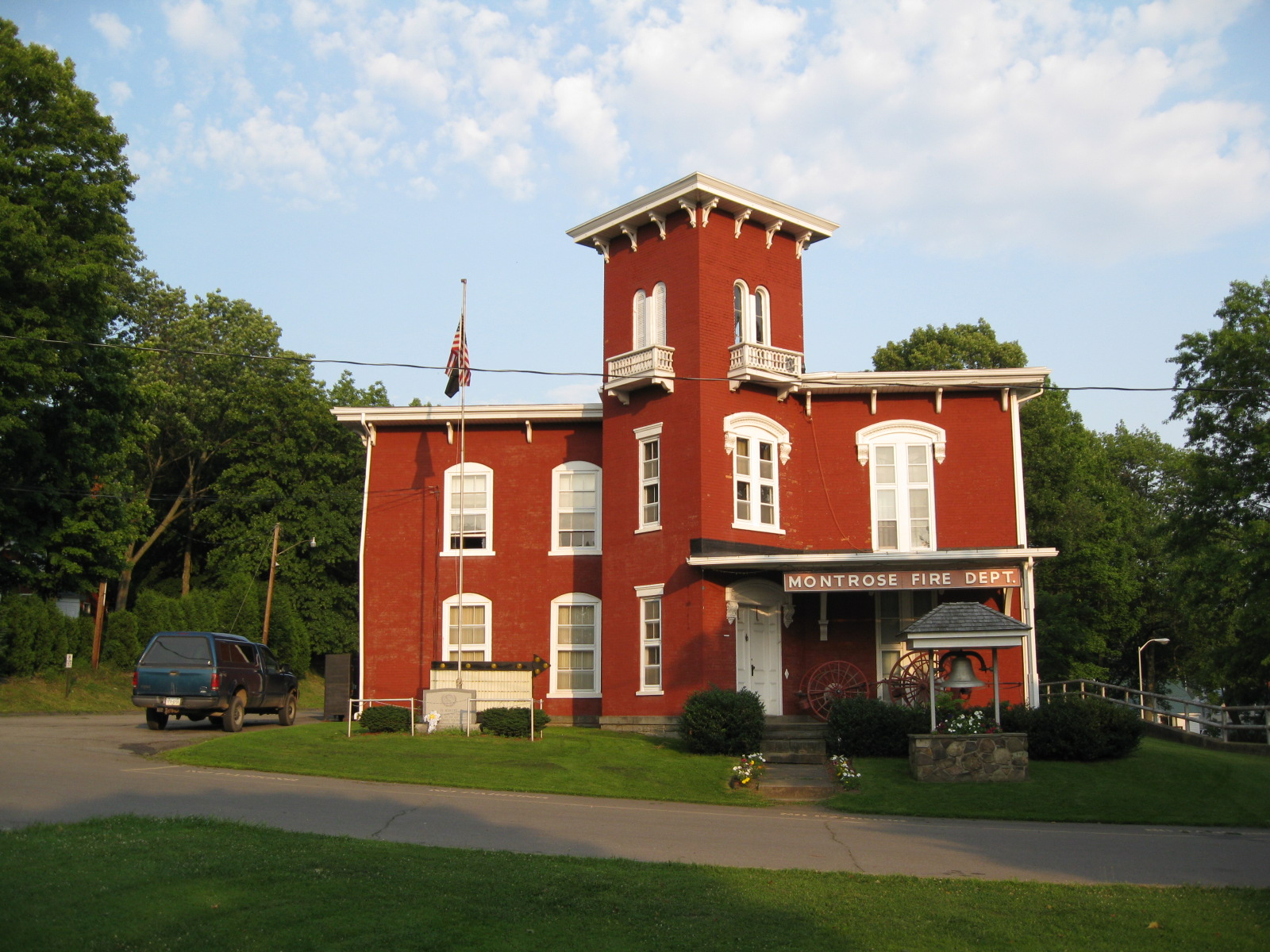
- Montrose Fire Department, August 2009

- Location within Pennsylvania Location within the United States
- Location: Roughly bounded by Wyalusing, Owego, Spruce and Chenango Streets; Lake Avenue; High and Turrell Streets; Grow Avenue; and Jessup Street, Montrose, Pennsylvania
- Coordinates: 41°50′02″N 75°52′38″W
- Area: 247.5 acres (100.2 ha)
- Built: c. 1812-c. 1935
- Architectural style: Greek Revival, Queen Anne, Italianate, Gothic Revival
- NRHP reference No.: 11000342
- Added to NRHP: June 8, 2011

The Montrose Historic District is a national historic district located in Montrose, Susquehanna County, Pennsylvania. The district encompasses 386 contributing buildings and two contributing sites in the central business district and surrounding residential areas of Montrose.

== History and architectural features ==
The historic buildings in this district were erected roughly between 1812 and 1935, and include textbook examples of Greek Revival, Queen Anne, Italianate, and Gothic Revival style architecture. The district is centered on the Susquehanna County Courthouse Complex.

In addition to the Courthouse complex, the Sylvanus Mulford House and Silver Lake Bank are separately listed on the National Register of Historic Places. Other notable buildings include the United Fire Company aka the Jessup house (c. 1855), Montrose Theater (c. 1920), Lyons Building at 13 Public Avenue, Sayre Building (1894), Loomis Building (1893), Masonic Lodge, Phoenix Block (1854), Tarbell Hotel (1814, 1870), William H. Cooper House (1860), Susquehanna County Historical Society and Free Library Association (1907), Bridgewater Baptist Church, First Presbyterian Church, Montrose United Methodist Church, and Holy Name of Mary Chapel Catholic Church (1886).

=== Placement of this district on the National Register of Historic Places ===
The nomination materials for placement of the Montrose Historic District (Montrose, Pennsylvania) on the National Register of Historic Places were reviewed by Pennsylvania's Historic Preservation Board on February 1, 2011 at 9:45 a.m. at the Labor and Industry Building in Harrisburg. Also considered for National Register placement at this meeting were: the Alden Villa in Lebanon County, the McCook Family Estate and the John A. Brashear House and Factory in Pittsburgh, the Quakertown Historic District in Bucks County, the Robb Farm in Huntingdon County, Wilpen Hall in Sewickley, and the Tindley Temple United Methodist Church and Marian Anderson House in Philadelphia, as well as multiple historic African American churches in Philadelphia that were presented together on a "Multiple Property Documentation Form."

This historic district was then officially added to the National Register of Historic Places later in 2011.

== Gallery ==
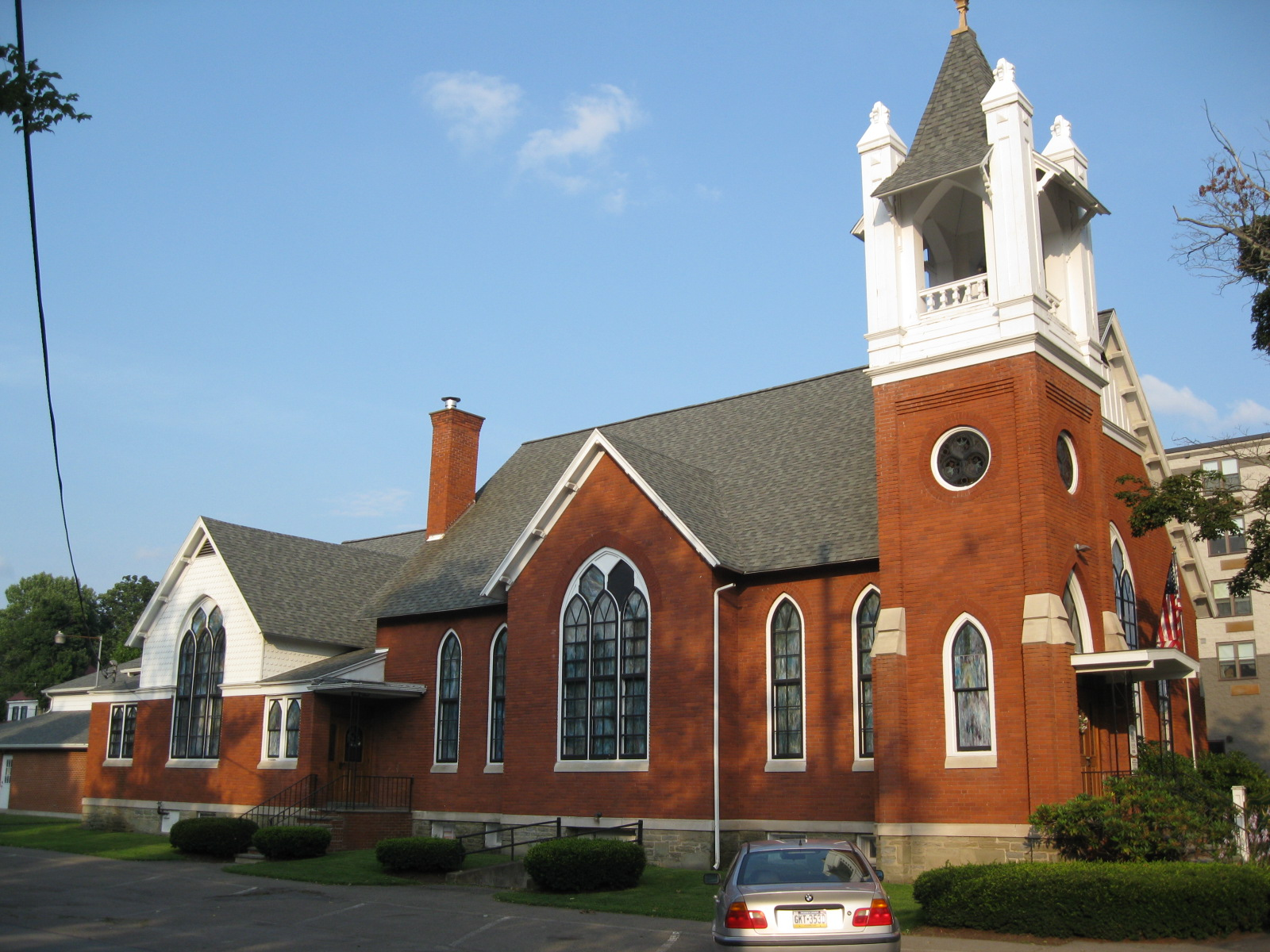
Bridgewater Baptist Church, August 2009

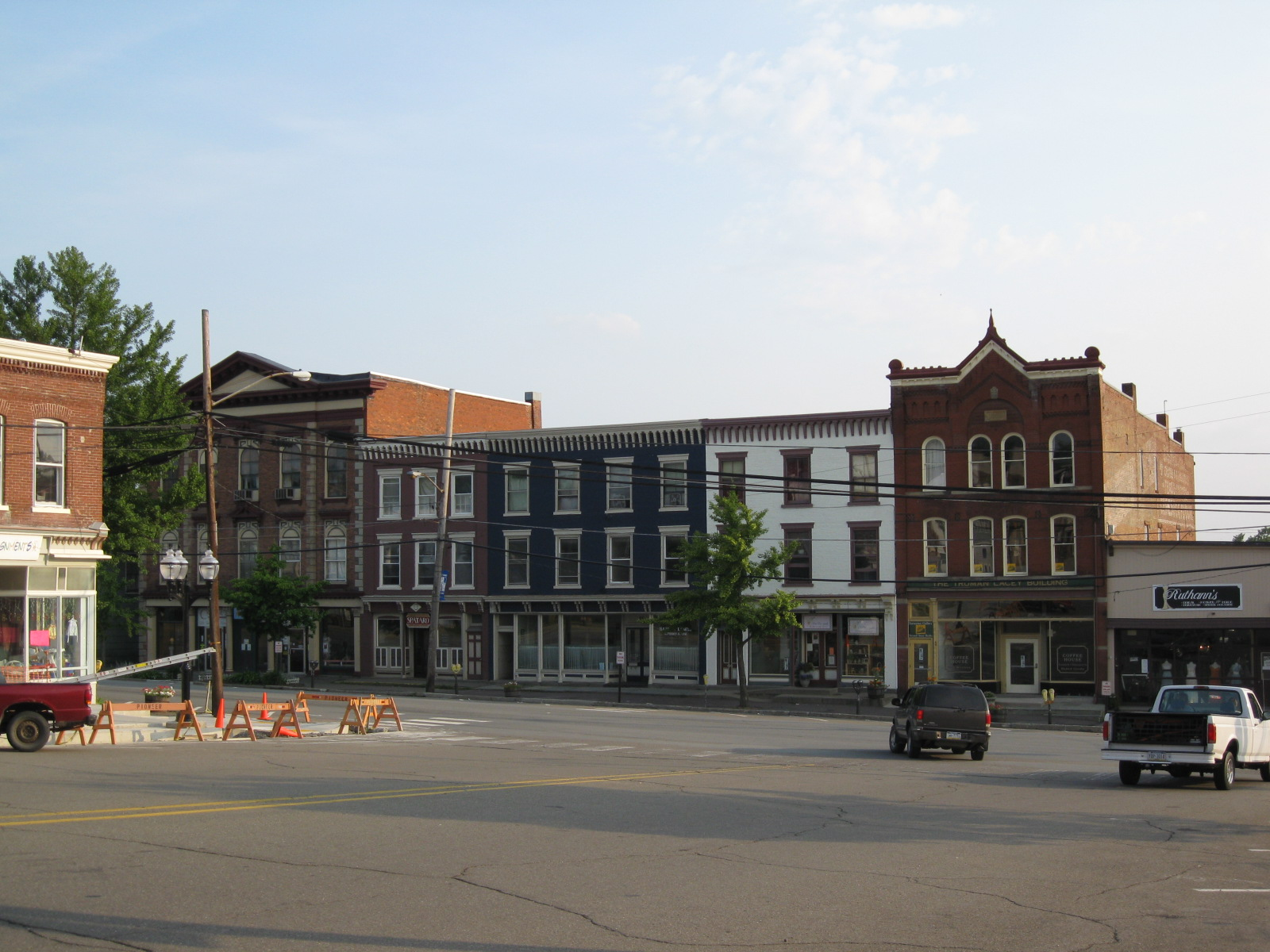
Phoenix Block, August 2009

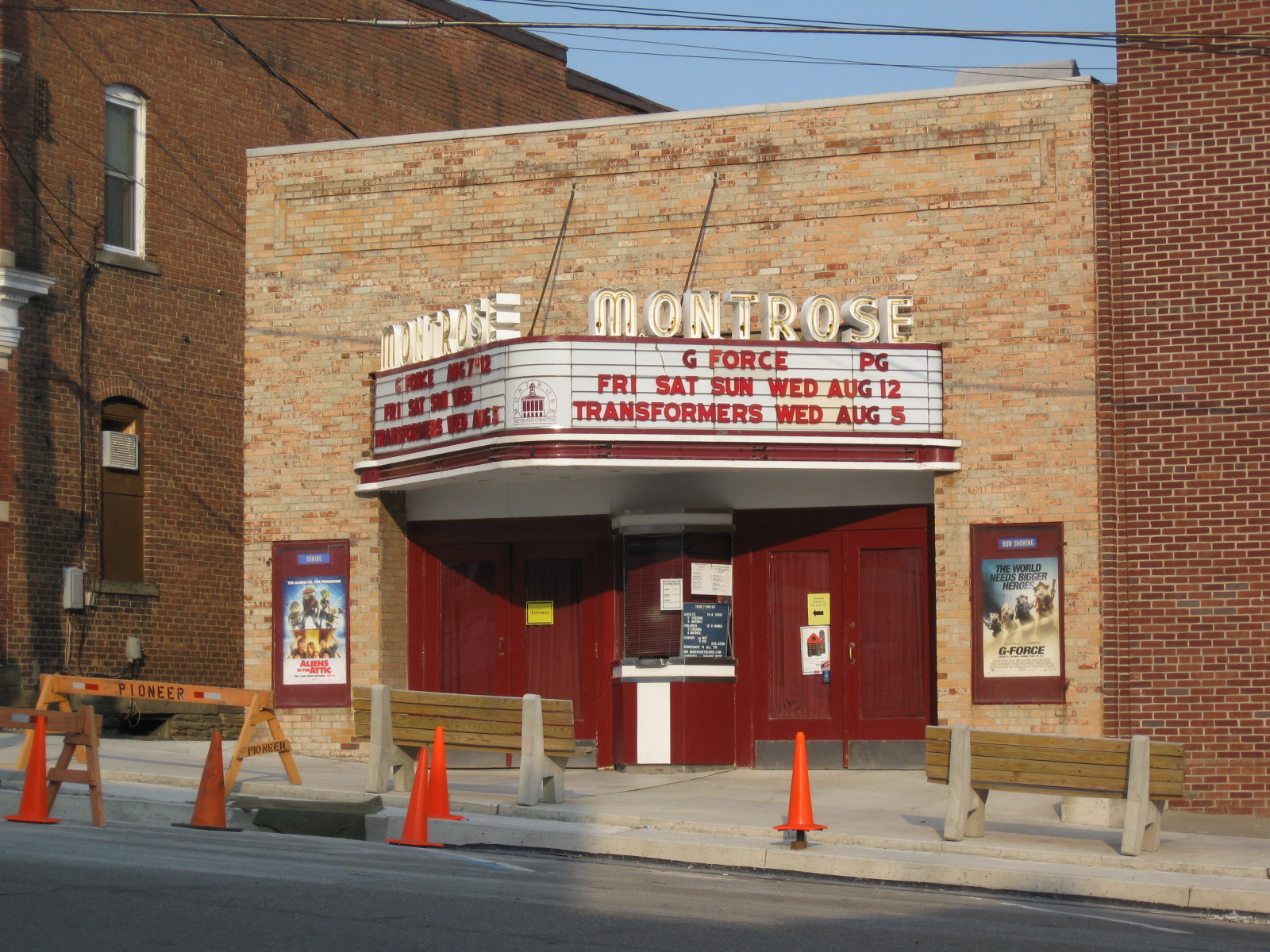
Montrose Theater, August 2009

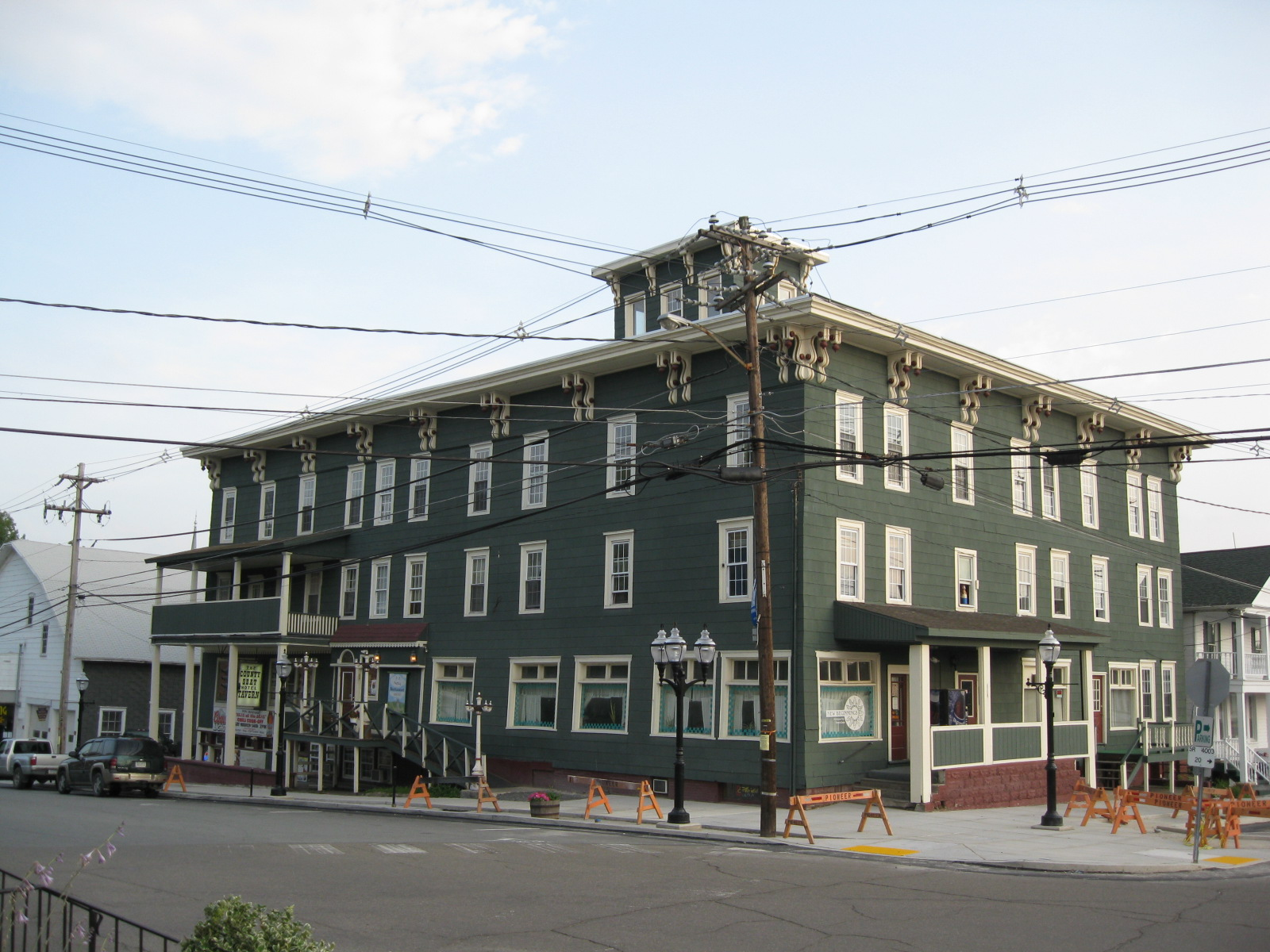
Tarbell Hotel, August 2009
