= Quakertown Historic District =

Historic district in Pennsylvania, United States

- U.S. National Register of Historic Places
- U.S. Historic district
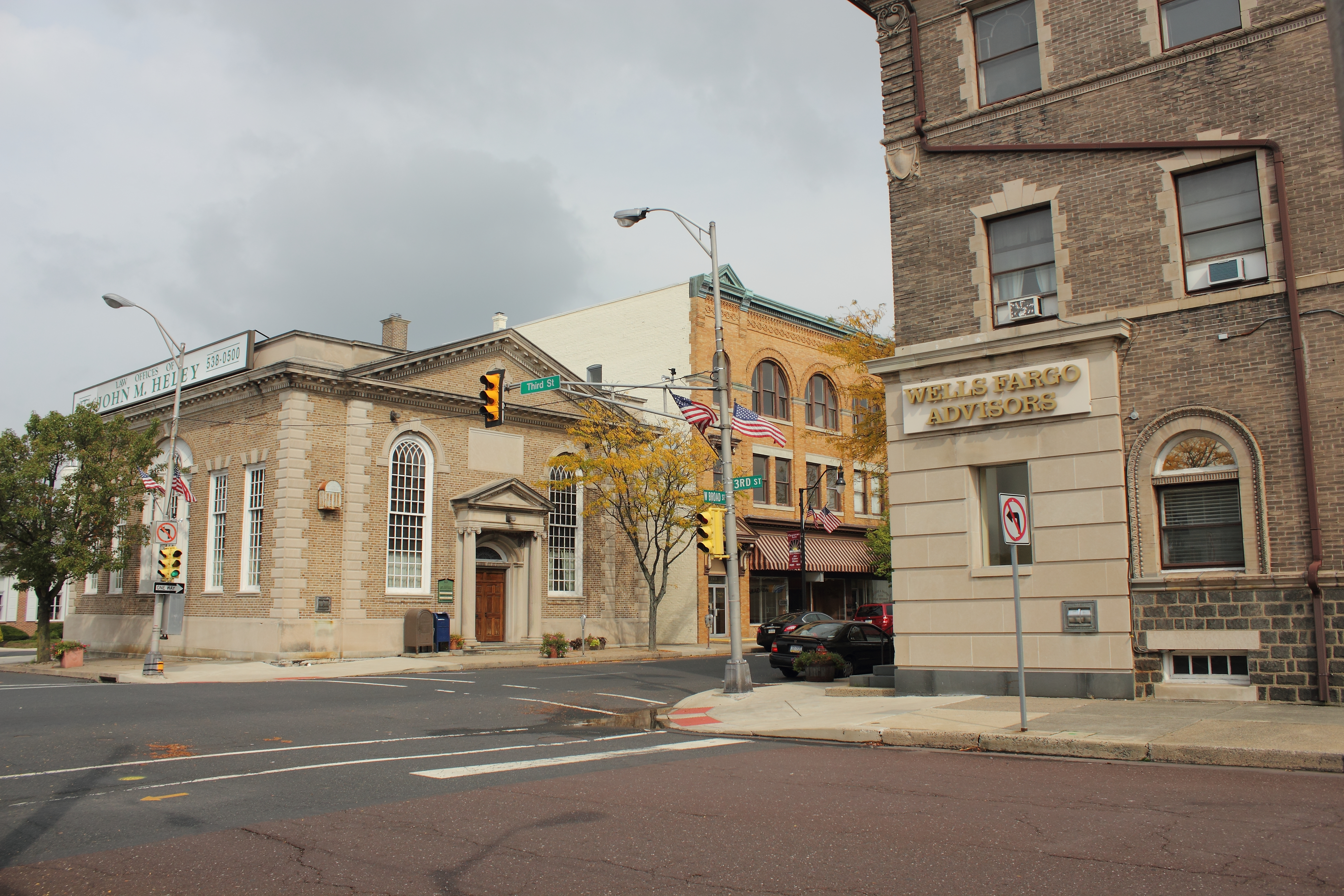
- Quakertown Historic District

- Location within Pennsylvania Location within the United States
- Location: Quakertown
- NRHP reference No.: 110002000
- Added to NRHP: April 20, 2011

The Quakertown Historic District is a national historic district which includes most of Quakertown, Pennsylvania. It encompasses, 386 acres and 2,197 contributing buildings.

== History and architectural features ==
Quakertown has a significant number of pre- and post-American Civil War buildings. Prior to the Civil War, these structures were designed in a broad range of architectural styles, including colonial, Federal, Greek Revival and Italianate. Post-Civil War, the buildings were primarily designed in the Victorian style. This district encompasses, 386 acres and 2,197 contributing buildings.

The district also has several buildings which listed separately on the National Register of Historic Places, including Liberty Hall and the Enoch Roberts House.

=== Placement of this district on the National Register of Historic Places ===
The nomination materials for placement of the Quakertown Historic District on the National Register of Historic Places were reviewed by Pennsylvania's Historic Preservation Board on February 1, 2011 at 9:45 a.m. at the Labor and Industry Building in Harrisburg, Pennsylvania. Also considered for National Register placement at this meeting were: the Robb Farm in Huntingdon County, the McCook Family Estate and the John A. Brashear House and Factory in Pittsburgh, the Montrose Historic District in Susquehanna County, Alden Villa in Lebanon County, Wilpen Hall in Sewickley, and the Tindley Temple United Methodist Church and Marian Anderson House in Philadelphia, as well as multiple historic African American churches in Philadelphia that were presented together on a "Multiple Property Documentation Form."

This historic district was then officially added to the National Register of Historic Places on April 20, 2011.
