= Curtis Institute of Music =

Private music school in Philadelphia, United States

Coordinates: 39.9488°N 75.1706°W

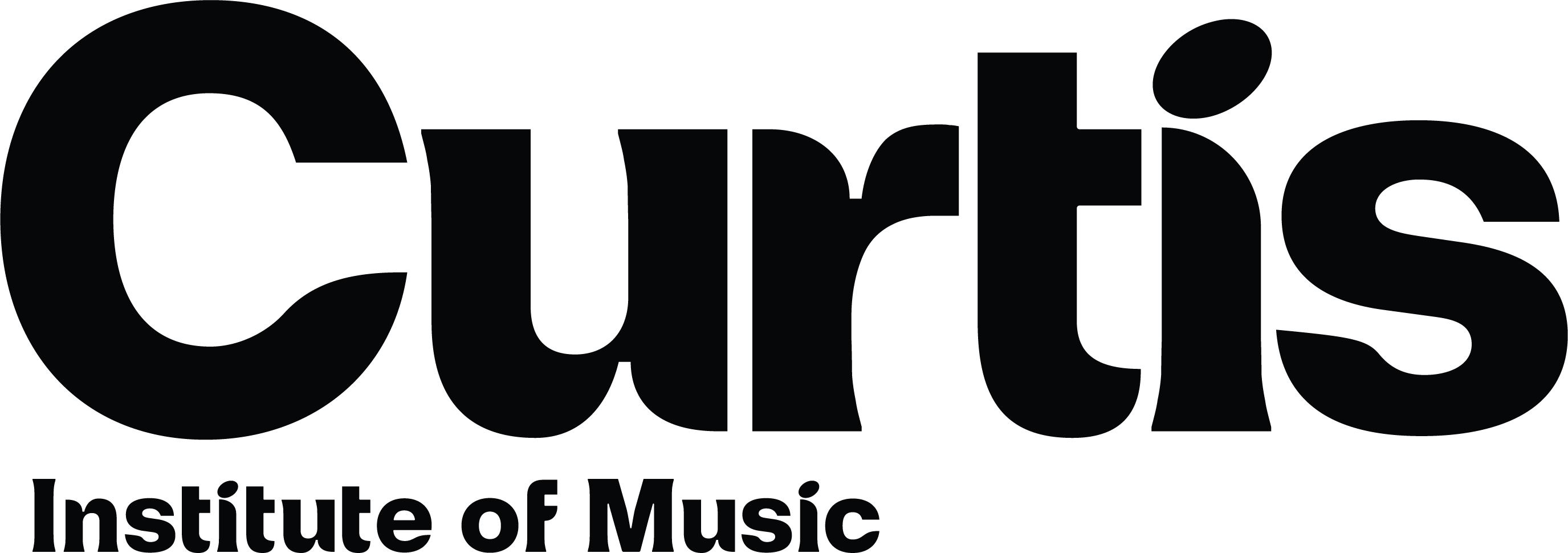
- Curtis Institute of Music Logo
- Type: Private conservatory
- Established: 1924; 102 years ago
- Founder: Mary Louise Curtis
- Endowment: $253.2 million (2019)
- President: Roberto Díaz
- Provost: Nick DiBerardino
- Students: 153
- Location: Philadelphia, Pennsylvania, United States
- Website: curtis.edu

The Curtis Institute of Music is a private conservatory in Philadelphia. It offers a performance diploma, a Bachelor of Music, Master of Music in opera, and a Professional Studies Certificate in opera. All students attend on a full scholarship. The Institute also offers needs based financial aid to help cover living expenses.

== History ==
=== 20th century ===
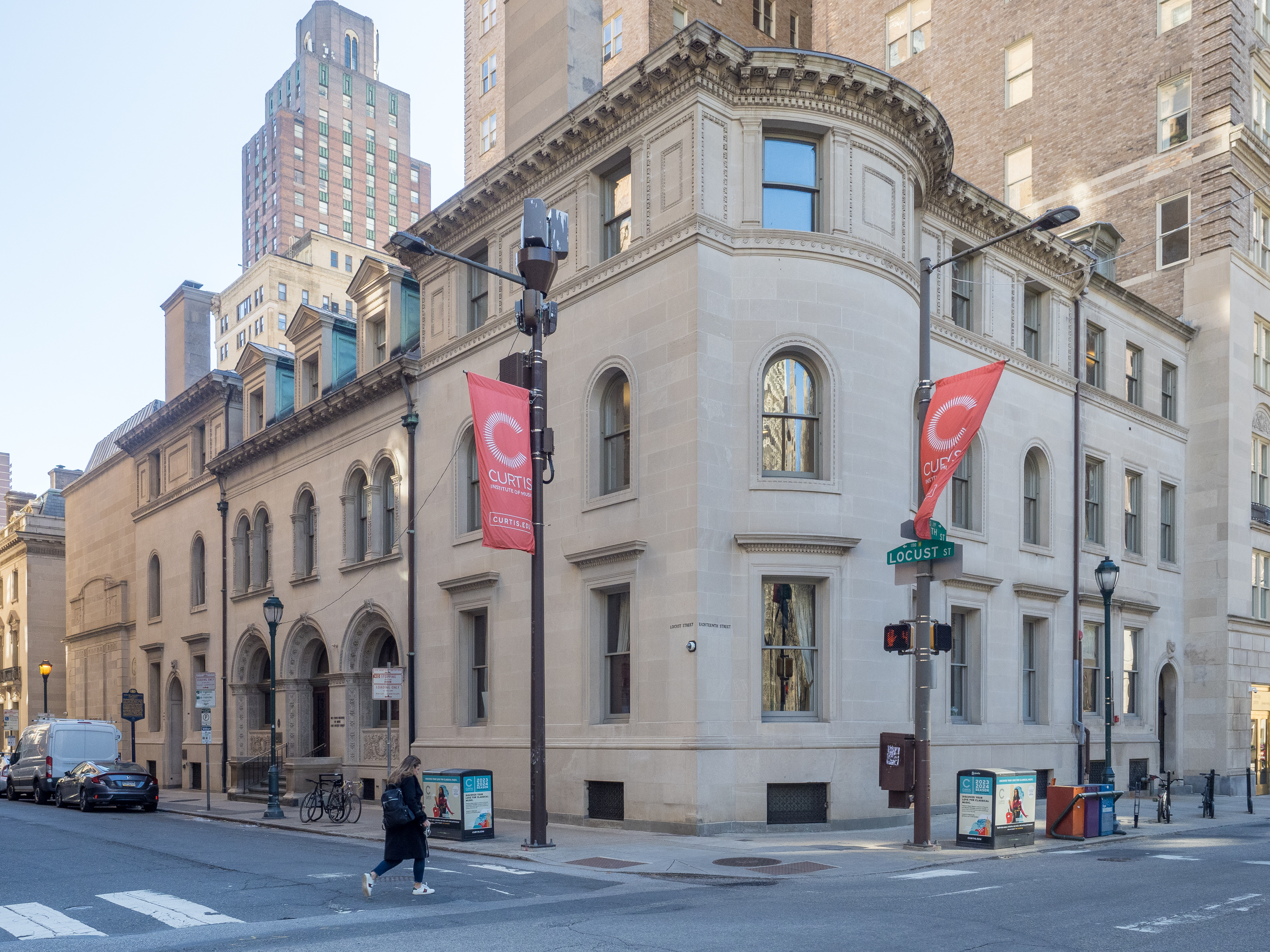
Curtis Institute of Music at 1726 Locust Street in Center City Philadelphia in 2024

The Curtis Institute of Music was founded in 1924, following the formation of the Philadelphia Orchestra in 1900 and the Philadelphia Opera Company in 1908 and amidst industrial decline and political corruption in Philadelphia. The institute's founder, Mary Louise Curtis Bok, a philanthropist, administrator, and major proponent of the Settlement Music School in Philadelphia, named the new school after her father, publishing magnate Cyrus Curtis.

The Commonwealth of Pennsylvania chartered the Curtis Institute on April 18, 1924, which opened October 1925 in three mansions at 1727 and 1720 Locust Street and 235 South 18th Street. Both the Curtis Institute and the Settlement Music School shared a building at Queen Street in South Philadelphia for the first year.

Bok established the institute to train talented musicians for professional careers and to teach music for its own sake and not as a means to another end. In an official statement, Bok wrote about the goals and expectations of the institution: “It is my aim that earnest students shall acquire a thorough musical education not learning only to sing or play, but also the history of music, the laws of its making, languages, ear training and musical appreciation. They shall learn to think and to express their thoughts against a background of a quiet culture, with the stimulus of personal contact with artist teachers who represent the highest and finest in their art. The aim is for quality of the work rather than quick, showy results.”

When the institute opened, it included two distinct divisions: a preparatory division for 400 students and a conservatory for 200 students. Tuition was five hundred dollars, and the school opened with 357 students. Mary Bok became the conservatory’s first president, a position she would hold until 1969. Johann Grolle served as the first school director for one year, William E. Walter became director in 1925 and Josef Hofmann, head of the piano department, became director in 1927. The institute added a library in 1925 with over 5,000 volumes. Other notable original faculty included conductor Leopold Stokowski, violinist Carl Flesch, pianists David Saperton and Isabelle Vengerova, singers Marcella Sembrich and Andreas Dippel, cellist Michel Penha, and flutist William Kincaid.

Under Josef Hofmann as director, Curtis made several new changes to advance the school's standards and publicize the school. Hofmann reduced enrollment to ensure that students would receive individualized attention. Curtis initiated weekly radio broadcasts through CBS in 1929. The Curtis String Quartet was established in 1928 and lasted until 1981. From 1931 to 1941, Fritz Reiner served as the conductor of the Curtis Orchestra, who toured with the orchestra throughout the country and broadcast the orchestra on the radio. The school held its first commencement a decade after opening, awarding Bachelor of Music and Master of Music degrees.

Starting in the late 1920s, Curtis made significant changes to fully support students financially. In 1928, Mrs. Louis Bok expanded the school's first endowment of $500,000 to $12.5 million. With the new endowment, the school purchased several Steinway pianos and enough instruments for an orchestra so that students would not have to pay for instruments. The school started providing summer residency programs for advanced students in the United States or Europe. The new funds further allowed all students to study at Curtis at no cost.

Since 1928, the institute has not charged tuition and provides full scholarships to all admitted students with an estimated value over $50,000 per year as of 2026. Instead, students pay comprehensive fees and other additional fees to cover the cost of maintaining buildings, health insurance, meal plans, a library fee, and a graduation fee. As of fall 2023, the comprehensive fee for Curtis is $3,500, and the health insurance fee is $2,500 which can be waived if other insurance plans provide adequate protection. Living in an on-site dormitory is mandatory the first two years, for students over age 18, and as of 2026 room and meal plan fees are $25,787 for a single room and $22,567 for a shared room.

The school faced financial difficulties in the 1930s, decreased enrollment, and had to remove some departments and reduce salaries. Josef Hoffman resigned in 1938 and was succeeded by Randall Thompson, who became director in 1939 and held the post for two years. Thompson introduced mandatory weekly lectures providing an overview of music history. Violinist Efrem Zimbalist, who had become the head of the violin department in 1930 at Curtis, replaced Thompson as director in 1941. Under Zimbalist, the institute focused more on training soloists and cutting down on costs, which became especially necessary during the war years. This focus caused a shift away from orchestra, opera, and chamber music and a reduction of the instrumental faculty. Due to the war, enrollment decreased from 223 in 1937 to 100 in 1942. In 1944, the Curtis Alumni Association established a concert office to assist graduates in their professions.

=== 21st century ===
Violist Roberto Díaz became President of Curtis in 2007, succeeding Gary Graffman who led the school from 1986 to 2006.

In 2020, following credible allegations of abuse at the hands of past faculty, the school ended its practice of keeping students enrolled "at the discretion of their major instrument teacher". In accepting the findings of an independent investigation of abuse allegations that found the practice was a "real threat" and a student "could be dismissed for any reason at any time", Curtis pledged several other steps to ensure students' well-being, including providing them with access to counseling.

The school completed a multi-year fundraising drive in 2025, enabling Curtis to maintain its tuition-free status by raising $255 million for its endowment between 2011 and 2025. Part of this drive included soliciting donations for and the purchase of the nearby Arts Alliance building on Rittenhouse Square, which belonged to the now defunct University of the Arts. The Arts Alliance building was significantly damaged in a fire July 4, 2025.

== Admission ==
The institute formerly served as a training ground for orchestral musicians to fill the ranks of the Philadelphia Orchestra, although composers, organists, pianists, guitarists, and singers are offered courses of study as well.

With the exception of composers, conductors, pianists, organists, and guitarists, admission is granted only to the number of students to fill a single orchestra and opera company. Accordingly, enrollment is in the range of 150 to 175 students. According to statistics compiled by the U.S. News & World Report, the institute has the lowest acceptance rate of any college or university (4 percent), making it among the most selective institutions of higher education in the United States.

Nina Simone claimed her application for a scholarship was rejected because of her race, despite her excellent credentials and audition performance. Simone was one of 75 pianists to audition in 1951; only three were accepted. A short while before her death, Simone was awarded an honorary diploma by Curtis. Staff at Curtis have denied Simone's allegations, noting other African-Americans had previously been admitted including Blanche Burton-Lyles and George Walker. Journalist Peter Dobrin suggested Simone was not a victim of racial discrimination, but rather was fairly judged by the school's famously high standards as lacking when compared to other applicants.

== Campus ==
=== Gould Rehearsal Hall ===
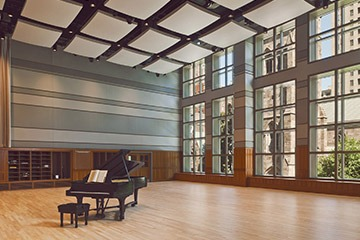
Gould Rehearsal Hall

Gould Rehearsal Hall is a 2,850-square-foot, acoustically designed rehearsal hall accommodating a full orchestra, with state-of-the-art video and audio capabilities.

=== Field Concert Hall ===
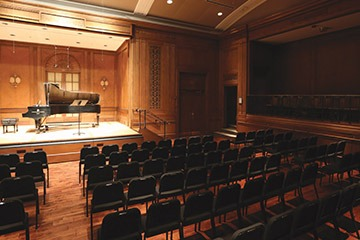
Field Concert Hall

Field Concert Hall is a 240-seat auditorium with facilities for both video and audio recording. The venue is used for weekly student recitals, faculty and alumni concerts, master classes, and recording sessions. It also houses a 4-manual, 73-rank Dobson Organ, Opus 100.

=== Rock Resource Center ===
The Rock Resource Center of the Curtis Institute of Music contains more than 100,000 music scores, books, and recordings for study and performance. Comprising the John de Lancie Library and the Curtis Archives, the Rock Resource Center’s mission is to: provide Curtis students, faculty, and staff with the best possible collection of printed music, books, periodicals, recordings, and electronic resources needed to fulfill the school's mission; promote the Rock Resource Center's holdings through forward thinking and open patron service; and preserve and make Curtis’s past accessible to the greater Curtis community. The Curtis Archives comprises largely unpublished materials whose value derives from its collection by, ownership of, or relation to, a Curtis-affiliated individual. Non-Curtis collections of published and unpublished materials, as well as published materials by anyone (Curtis-related or not), can be found in Special Collections. Official Curtis recordings are part of the library collection.

==== Penelope P. Watkins Ensemble in Residence ====
The Dover Quartet is the Penelope P. Watkins Ensemble in Residence at Curtis. Their faculty residency integrates teaching and mentorship, and the resident ensemble recruits young string quartets to form new professional chamber ensembles.
