= John A. Brashear House and Factory =

Historic buildings in Pennsylvania, United States

- U.S. National Register of Historic Places
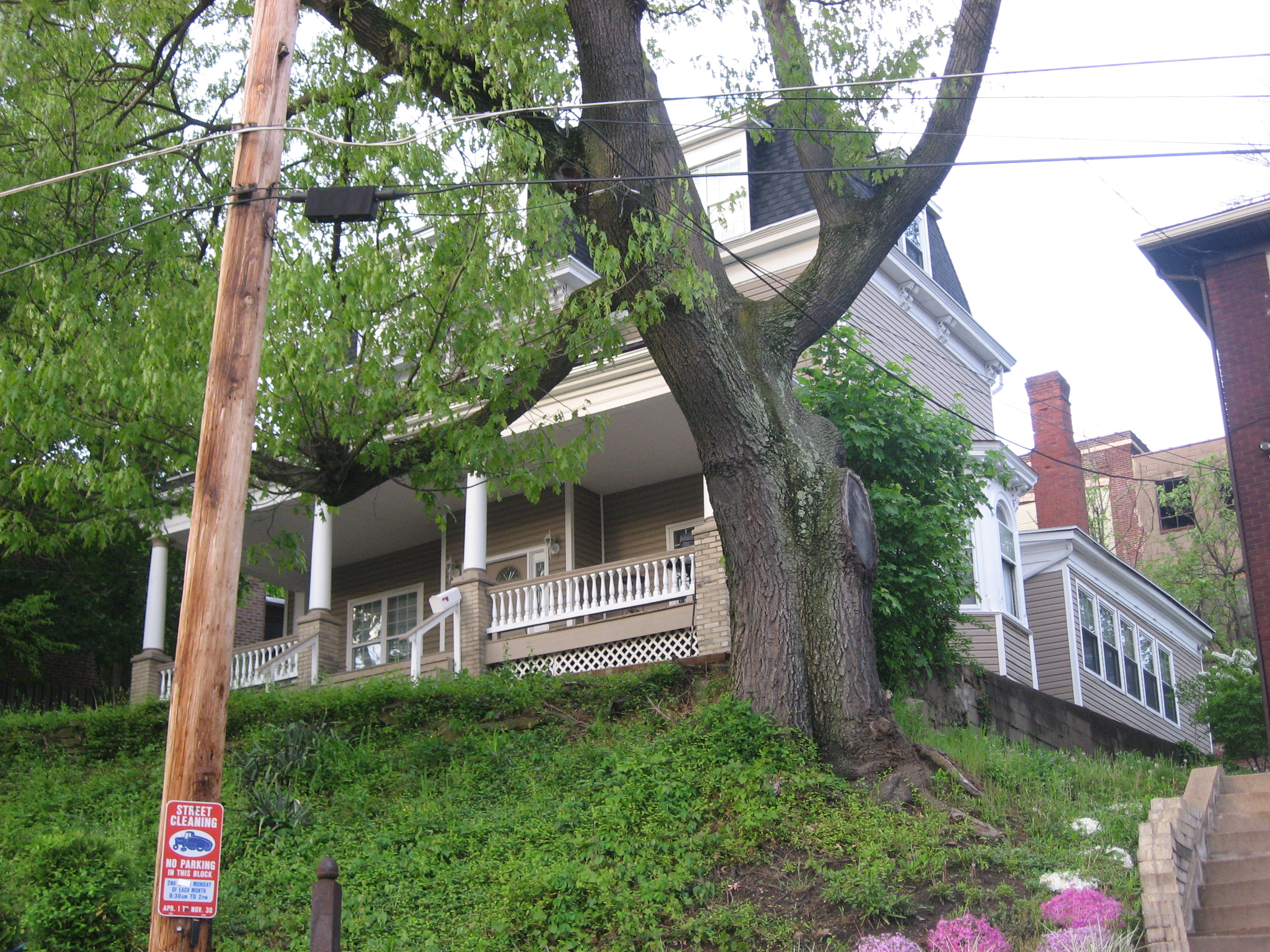

- Location within Pittsburgh Location within Pennsylvania Location within the United States
- Location: 1954 Perrysville Avenue, Pittsburgh, Pennsylvania
- Coordinates: 40°27′47″N 80°0′48″W
- Built: 1886
- NRHP reference No.: 12001093
- Added to NRHP: December 26, 2012

The John A. Brashear House and Factory in the Perry South neighborhood of Pittsburgh, Pennsylvania, was built in 1886. Former home of astronomer John Brashear (1840–1920), who was described by former Pennsylvania Governor Martin Grove Brumbaugh as "Pennsylvania's most eminent citizen," the site was listed on the National Register of Historic Places on December 6, 2012.

== History and architectural features ==
The site consists of a Second Empire style house (1886) and a two-story 105’ x 38’ brick factory building (1886). A small brick wash house was added around 1900. The site was Brashear's primary residence in the latter part of this life. His Brashear Company factory manufactured optical instruments for science and industry. The company continued to operate from the factory after his death in 1920, at one point making components for the World War II era Norden bombsight. The company moved out of the factory around 1954.

The factory was demolished by Pittsburgh on March 17, 2015, after one of the factory's walls had partially collapsed onto an adjacent apartment building the night before. The factory had been owned by the city since 2012, but it was unable to allocate funds to correct structural and roof deficiencies. The demolition contract was valued at $235,000.

During the demolition, workers discovered a 120-year-old time capsule in the building's former cornerstone. Made from brass and roughly the size of a dictionary, the box was later opened by a member of the Antique Telescope Society, noting that the contents included plans and blueprints of Brashear's factory, a photograph of mechanical workers who had been employed by Brashear's factory in August 1894, an optical glass, letters from and to Brashear, newspaper articles dating from 1891 to 1894, photographs of prominent citizens of the Pittsburgh area and of Brashear's family, a lock of hair from Brashear's wife, Phoebe, and a book entitled, “In Memoriam William Thaw,” which paid homage to Brashear's mentor who provided the financial support which enabled Brashear to build his home and factory.

=== Placement of this property on the National Register of Historic Places ===
The nomination materials for placement of the John A. Brashear House and Factory on the National Register of Historic Places were reviewed by Pennsylvania's Historic Preservation Board on February 1, 2011, at 9:45 a.m. at the Labor and Industry Building in Harrisburg, Pennsylvania. Also considered for National Register placement at this meeting were: the Alden Villa in Lebanon County, the McCook Family Estate in Pittsburgh, the Montrose Historic District in Susquehanna County, the Quakertown Historic District in Bucks County, Wilpen Hall in Sewickley, the Robb Farm in Huntingdon County, and the Tindley Temple United Methodist Church and Marian Anderson House in Philadelphia, as well as multiple historic African American churches in Philadelphia that were presented together on a "Multiple Property Documentation Form."

The John A. Brashear House and Factory were then officially listed on the National Register of Historic Places later in 2011.
