= Michel Penha =

Dutch-American cellist (1888–1982)

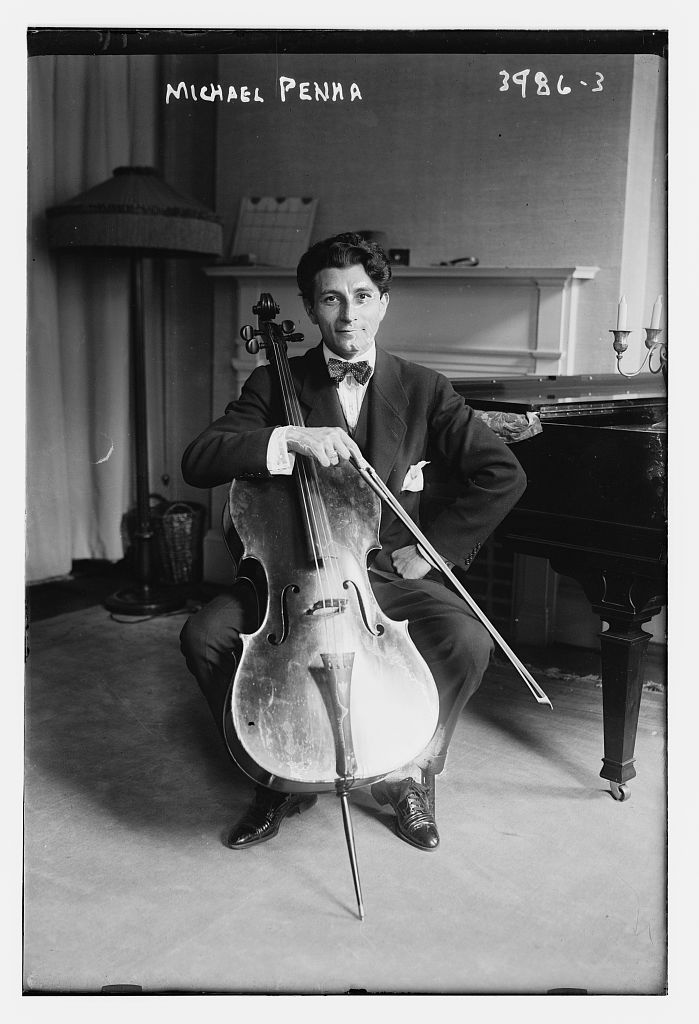
- Penha in 1916
- Born: December 14, 1888; Amsterdam, Netherlands
- Died: February 10, 1982 (aged 93); Los Angeles, California
- Other name: Michael Penha
- Occupations: Director, cellist

Michel Penha (December 14, 1888 – February 10, 1982) was a director and cellist. He played with the Philadelphia Orchestra from 1920 to 1925.

== Biography ==
He was born in Amsterdam, Netherlands to Maurice Penha, He graduated from the Amsterdam Conservatoire in 1905. He studied music under Isaac Mossel and Hugo Becker. He migrated to New York City in 1909. He never married.

In 1932, Dene Denny and Hazel Watrous brought the Neah-Kah-Nie String Quartet, with Michel Penha as its director and cellist to Carmel-by-the-Sea, California.

Penha died in Los Angeles, California, at age 93.
