= Wilpen Hall =

Historic house in Pennsylvania, United States

- U.S. National Register of Historic Places
- Pittsburgh Landmark – PHLF
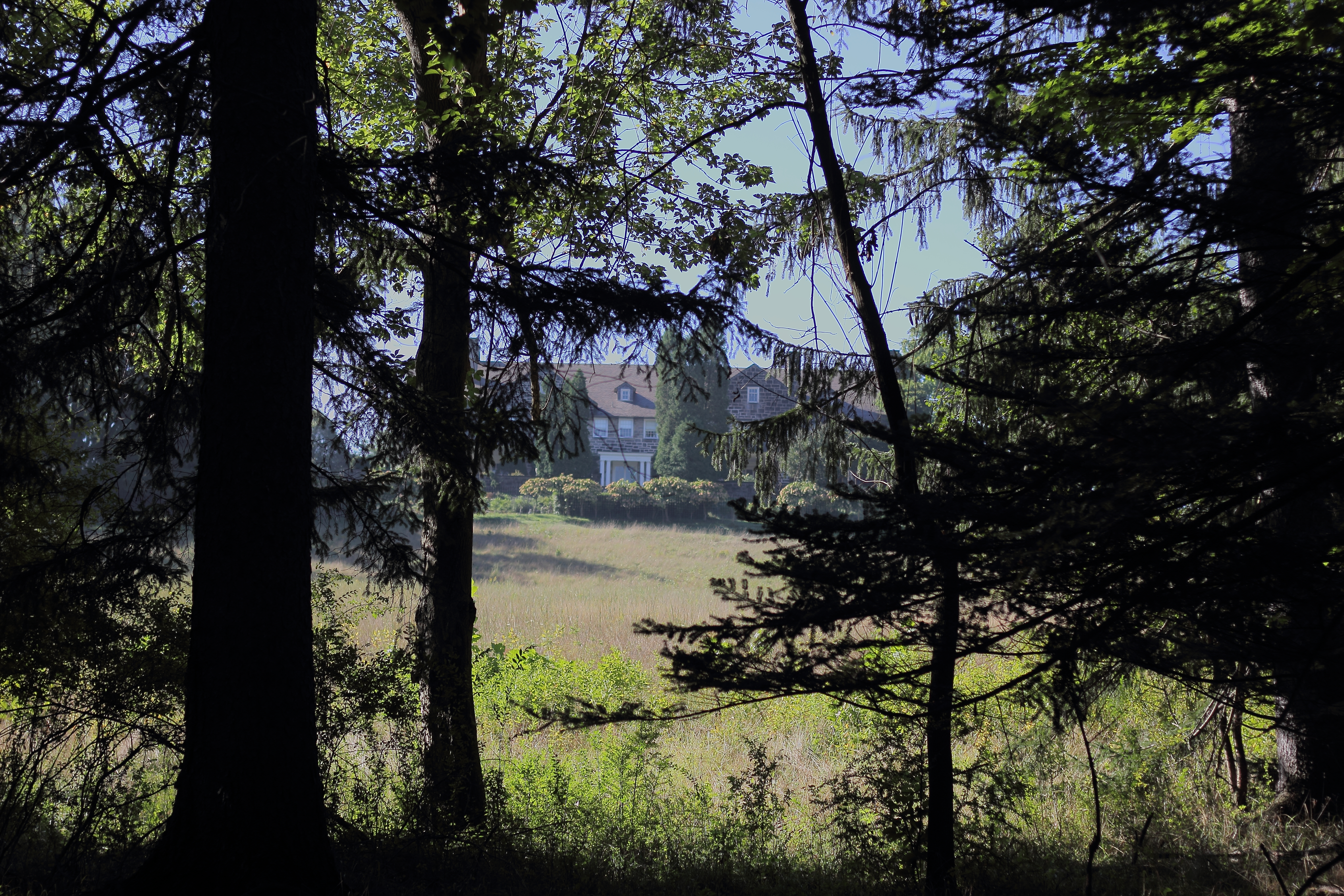
- The largest building of Wilpen Hall, seen through the trees at the edge of the property

- Location within Pennsylvania Location within the United States
- Location: 889–895 Blackburn Road and 201 Scaife Road, Sewickley Heights, Pennsylvania, USA
- Coordinates: 40°32′51.97″N 80°9′5.99″W
- Built: 1897–1900
- Architect: George S. Orth & Brothers
- Architectural style: Beaux-Arts
- NRHP reference No.: 11000201

Significant dates
- Added to NRHP: April 20, 2011
- Designated PHLF: 2001

Wilpen Hall is an estate in Sewickley Heights, Pennsylvania, located at 889–895 Blackburn Road and 201 Scaife Road. Built for William Penn Snyder and his wife during the late 19th century, it was added to the List of Pittsburgh History and Landmarks Foundation Historic Landmarks in 2001, and the National Register of Historic Places on April 20, 2011.

== History and architectural features ==
This historic home was built for William Penn Snyder and his wife as a summer home. Snyder was the founder of the Shenango Furnace Company and its subsidiaries. Designed by George Orth and Brothers in the style of an English Manor house, the residence was subsequently named "Wilpen," using a contraction of Snyder's first and middle names. Construction took place from 1897 to 1900. In 1930, the estate was left to their two sons, William Penn Snyder, Jr. and G. Whitney Snyder. As of 2006, the Snyder family still resided in the home.

=== Placement of this property on the National Register of Historic Places ===
The nomination materials for placement of Wilpen Hall on the National Register of Historic Places were reviewed by Pennsylvania's Historic Preservation Board on February 1, 2011, at 9:45 a.m. at the Labor and Industry Building in Harrisburg, Pennsylvania. Also considered for National Register placement at this meeting were: the Robb Farm in Huntingdon County, the McCook Family Estate and the John A. Brashear House and Factory in Pittsburgh, the Montrose Historic District in Susquehanna County, the Quakertown Historic District in Bucks County, Alden Villa in Lebanon County, and the Tindley Temple United Methodist Church and Marian Anderson House in Philadelphia, as well as multiple historic African American churches in Philadelphia that were presented together on a "Multiple Property Documentation Form."

The historic estate was then officially added to the National Register of Historic Places later in 2011.

== Usage in films ==
The mansion was used for interior shots of John du Pont’s Foxcatcher Farm estate in the film Foxcatcher (2013), starring Steve Carell, Mark Ruffalo, and Channing Tatum.

== Gallery ==
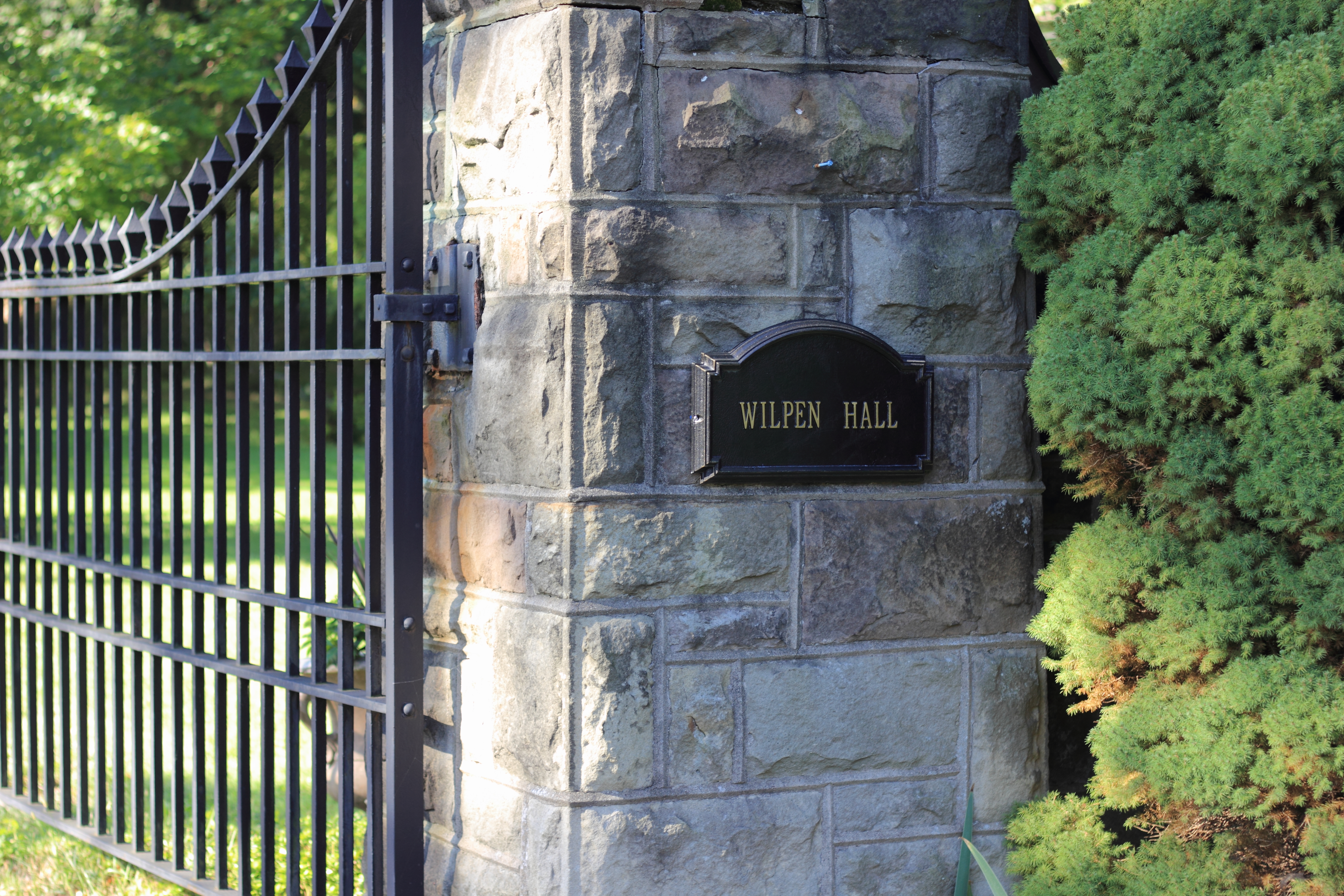

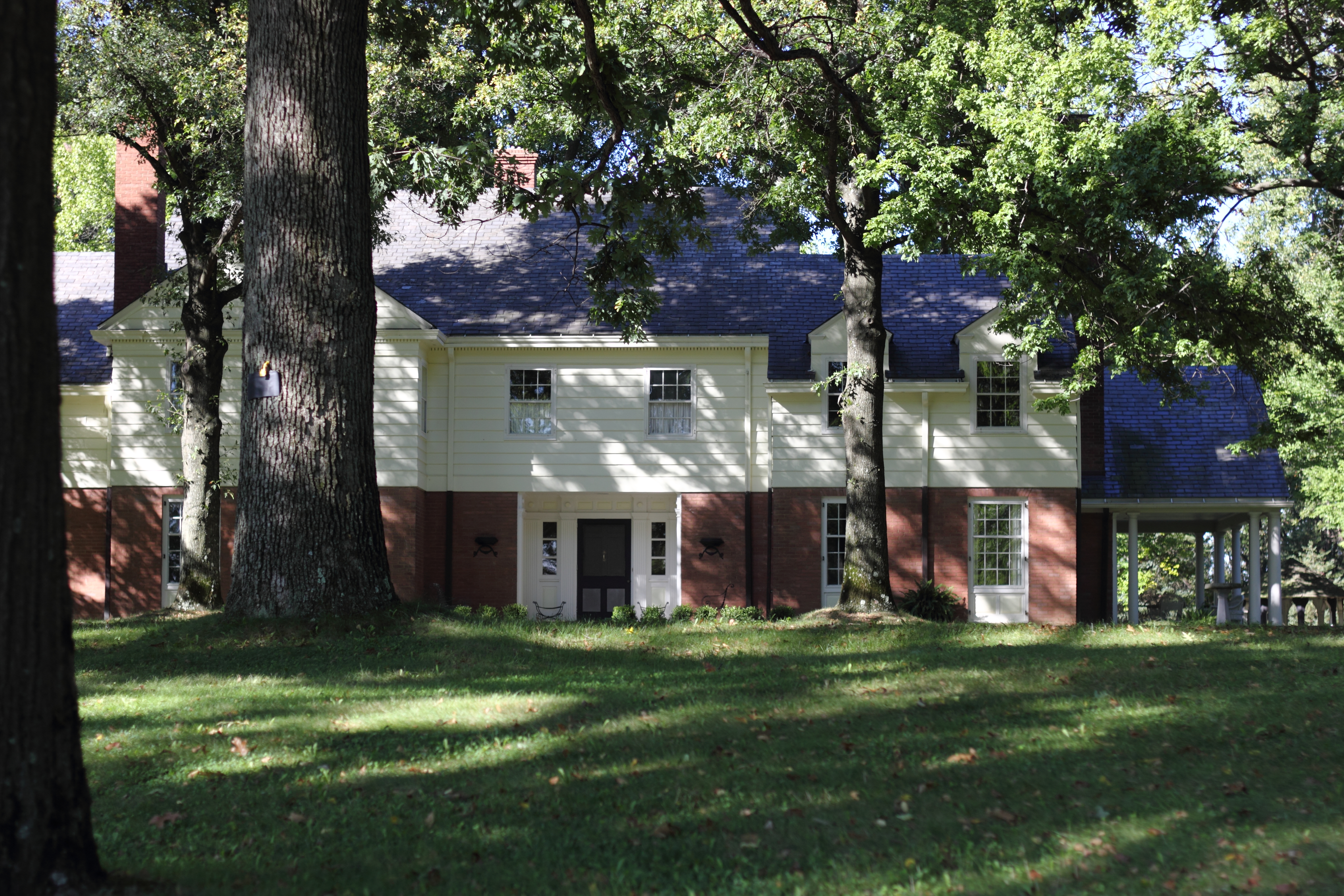
