= Robb Farm =

Historic house in Pennsylvania, US

- U.S. National Register of Historic Places
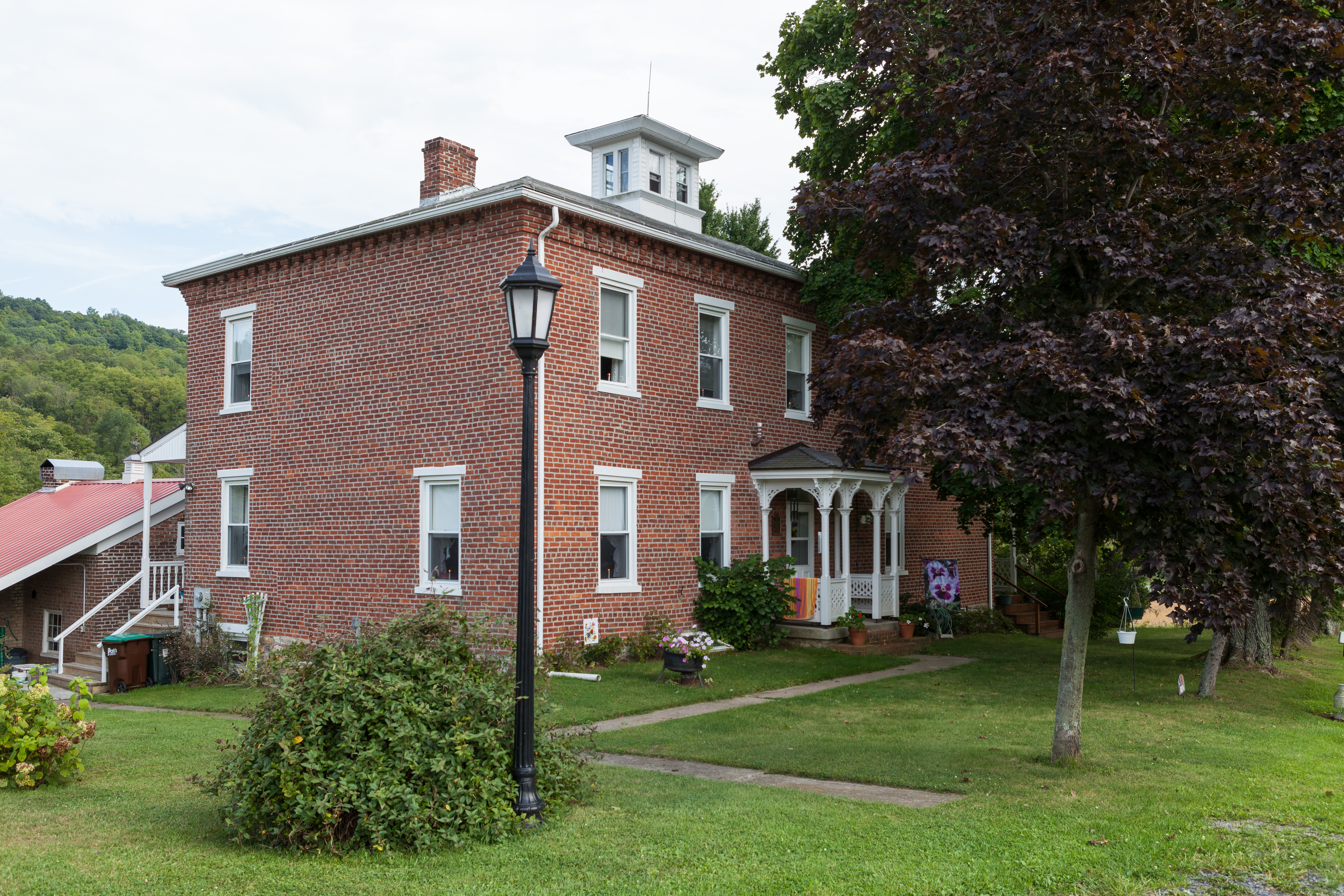

- Location within Pennsylvania Location within the United States
- Location: 11023 Hartslog Valley Road, Walker Township, Pennsylvania
- Coordinates: 40°29′01″N 78°05′28″W
- Built: 1826, 1878
- Architectural style: Federal, Italianate, Georgian
- NRHP reference No.: 11000202
- Added to NRHP: April 20, 2011

The Robb Farm is a historic home and farm located at 11023 Hartslog Valley Road in Walker Township in Huntingdon County, Pennsylvania.

The property was listed on the National Register of Historic Places in 2011.

== History and architectural features ==
The Robb Farm was erected in Huntingdon County's Walker Township. Multiple newspaper classified advertisements during the 1940s and 1950s confirm that the farm was located in that township's Hartslog Valley, and that M. G. Robb frequently engaged in livestock sales and purchases. Hereford cows were among the animals mentioned.

=== Placement of property on the National Register of Historic Places ===
The nomination materials for placement of the Robb Farm on the National Register of Historic Places were reviewed by Pennsylvania's Historic Preservation Board on February 1, 2011, at 9:45 a.m. at the Labor and Industry Building in Harrisburg, Pennsylvania. Also considered for National Register placement at this meeting were: the Alden Villa in Lebanon County, the McCook Family Estate and the John A. Brashear House and Factory in Pittsburgh, the Montrose Historic District in Susquehanna County, the Quakertown Historic District in Bucks County, Wilpen Hall in Sewickley, and the Tindley Temple United Methodist Church and Marian Anderson House in Philadelphia, as well as multiple historic African American churches in Philadelphia that were presented together on a "Multiple Property Documentation Form."

The Robb Farm was then officially listed on the National Register of Historic Places later in 2011.
