= Alden Villa =

Historic house in Pennsylvania, United States

- U.S. National Register of Historic Places
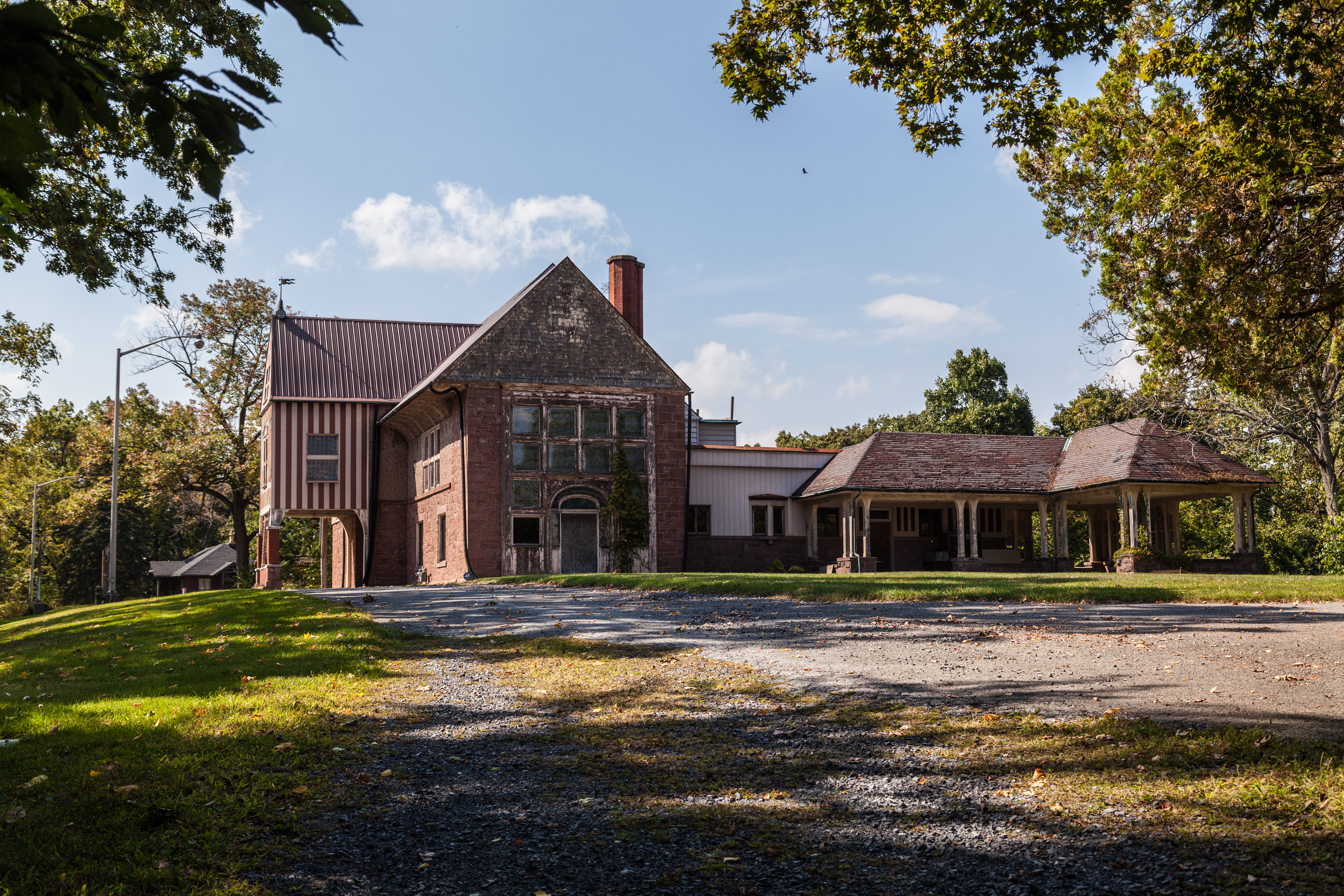

- Location within Pennsylvania Location within the United States
- Interactive map showing the location of Alden Villa
- Location: 1012 Alden Way, Cornwall, Pennsylvania
- Coordinates: 40°16′25″N 76°25′49″W
- Built: 1881
- Architect: Stanford White
- Architectural style: Queen Anne, Shingle Style
- NRHP reference No.: 11000203
- Added to NRHP: April 20, 2011

Alden Villa, also known as Millwood, is a historic home located in Cornwall, Lebanon County, Pennsylvania. Representative of the Queen Anne and Shingle Style, it was designed by Stanford White, one of the leading architects of the Gilded Age. Built in 1881, the home and its eight-acre property were added to the National Register of Historic Places in 2011.

== History and architectural features ==
Millwood, an 11,223 square foot residence which was built in 1881 for R. Percy Alden, was designed by the prominent Gilded Age architect Stanford White. Employing the Queen Anne and Shingle styles of architecture, White created what has been described by historians at The Lebanon Valley Conservancy as "a unique dwelling and a spectacular example of an Old English manor house" which is "perched high on a hill." It is located at 100 Freeman Drive in Cornwall, Lebanon County, Pennsylvania.

Architectural features include an exterior main gable entrance with early Victorian-style half-timbering, an arched ceiling, clerestory windows, a great hall with a musicians' gallery, a stained glass window wall, and a stucco mosaic wall adorned with broken colored glass. Owned by the Alden family until 1949, it was sold that year to the Amalgamated Garment Workers Union, which converted it to a recreational rather than residential structure.

Also designed by White and erected in 1881 for Alden was the R. Percy Alden Carriage House, which now stands at 104 Alden Way, several hundred feet northwest of the structure's original location.

On January 30, 2006, Edward H. Arnold and Michael Kip Kelly formed a company to restore the house. Work was fully completed on the carriage house and partially so on the mansion between 2007 and 2009; however, re-roofing of the mansion had still not yet been completed by early February 2010 when newspapers reported that Arnold had brought suit against Kelly for $1.7 million, alleging that Kelly had failed to pay back loans which had been made "for building improvements and operating expenses." Kelly responded by asking the court to dissolve the business, Calvania.

=== Placement of this property on the National Register of Historic Places ===
The nomination materials for placement of Alden Villa (also known as Millwood) on the National Register of Historic Places were reviewed by Pennsylvania's Historic Preservation Board on February 1, 2011, at 9:45 a.m. at the Labor and Industry Building in Harrisburg, Pennsylvania. Also considered for National Register placement at this meeting were: the Robb Farm in Huntingdon County, the McCook Family Estate and the John A. Brashear House and Factory in Pittsburgh, the Montrose Historic District in Susquehanna County, the Quakertown Historic District in Bucks County, Wilpen Hall in Sewickley, and the Tindley Temple United Methodist Church and Marian Anderson House in Philadelphia, as well as multiple historic African American churches in Philadelphia that were presented together on a "Multiple Property Documentation Form."

The historic residence and its eight-acre property were then officially added to the National Register of Historic Places later in 2011.

== In popular culture ==
Alden Villa was the primary filming location for the slasher movie WatchUsDie.com (2001), serving as the dorm where a majority of the movie takes place.
