= Miss Black USA Pageant =

National scholarship competition for Black women

The Miss Black USA Scholarship Pageant is a national scholarship competition for young women of African descent that was founded in 1986 by Karen Arrington. While Ms. Arrington has a long-standing history of hosting a national Miss Black USA Scholarship Pageant, her system has not been exclusive in doing so consecutively. As indicated by the chart below, there have been some years where "no pageant was held" by Ms. Arrington's State of Maryland organized non-profit, for example in years such as 1998, 1999 and 2000. However, similar to Miss USA and Miss America both being national systems, there have been other non-profits to host national scholarship pageants to celebrate Black women, with documented queens.

The Miss Black USA Pageant System founded by Ms. Arrington is a non-profit corporation in the state of Maryland, recognized under the 501(c)3 code of the Internal Revenue Service. The current titleholder under her pageant system is Harmony Edosomwan of Vermont, who was crowned on August 9, 2026.

== History and former titleholders ==
The first titleholder was Tamiko Gibson, representing Maryland, who was crowned Miss Black USA 1987 at the JW Marriot in Washington, D.C., on June 6, 1987. Gibson would later complain that she had been improperly dethroned in May 1988 and received none of the promised prizes.

On August 23, 2003, Elizabeth Muto won the pageant, which was held in Miami. Muto returned her crown later that year because she was unhappy with the contract that the pageant asked her to sign, which would have made them her exclusive publicist, agent and manager.

== State pageants ==
Each year, state competitions are held across the nation including Alabama, Arizona, California, Colorado, Florida, Georgia, Iowa, Massachusetts, Mississippi, New York, North Carolina, Ohio, Oregon, Pennsylvania, South Carolina, Tennessee, Virginia and Washington. The Miss Black USA organization licenses the state pageants. Women from areas where a state pageant is not held may apply as a delegate-at-large.

== Winners ==
Year	Name	State	Notes
1987	Tamiko Gibson	Maryland	Crowned June 6, 1987, in Washington, D.C.
1988	Melanie Elaine Rainey	Illinois	Died in 1995 at age 32.
1989	Leslie Elizabeth Waddell (later Ezina LeBlanc)	Michigan	Crowned in College Park, Maryland. (*Later dethroned and replaced by first runner-up, Elizabeth Regina Wallace of Florida)
1990	Clarissa Lester	South Carolina	
1991	Tarsha Whitaker	Houston	
1992			
1993	Ebony Warren	Florida	
1994	Deya Smith	Connecticut	
1995	Sheila Mutumba Rugege	Louisiana	
1996	Dawn Moss	Maryland	
1997	Caroline Mack	North Carolina	
1998	Alicia Hughes	Texas	Crowned in Houston, Texas, on August 22, 1998. (Pageant hosted by USA Metroplex Pageant Systems, Inc.)
1999	No pageant held		
2000	No pageant held		
2001	Lisa Marie Miree	Ohio	Crowned March 24, 2011, in Birmingham, Alabama.
2002	No pageant held		
2003	Elizabeth Muto	Nevada	Crowned August 23, 2003, in Miami. Returned crown four months later.
2004	No pageant held		
2005	Celi Marie Dean	Minnesota	Crowned August 7, 2005, in Washington, D.C.
2006
2007	Kalilah Allen-Harris	Tennessee	Crowned June 1, 2007, in The Gambia.
2008	Kristen E. White	Georgia	
2009	Shayna Y. Rudd	Pennsylvania	Crowned August 3, 2009, in Washington, D.C.
2010	Osas Ighodaro	Connecticut	Crowned August 9, 2010, in Washington, D.C.
2011	Ocielia Gibson	Texas	Crowned August 8, 2011, in Washington, D.C.
2012	Salena Watkins	New York	Crowned August 13, 2012, in Washington, D.C.
2013	Amanda McCoy	North Carolina	Crowned August 12, 2013, in Washington, D.C.
2014	Jasmin Alexander	Colorado	Crowned August 10, 2014, in Washington, D.C.
2015	Madison Gibbs	North Carolina	Crowned August 9, 2015, in Washington, D.C.
2016	Tonille Simone Watkis	Connecticut	Crowned August 7, 2016, in Washington, D.C.
2017	Daphne Marcelle Lee	New Jersey	Crowned August 20, 2017, in Washington, D.C.
2018	Kelsi Alexandria Horn*	Michigan	Crowned August 12, 2018, in Washington, D.C. (*Later dethroned and replaced by first runner-up, Kelli Abernathy of Alabama)
2019	TeKema Balentine	Wisconsin	Crowned August 11, 2019, in Washington, D.C.
2020	No pageant held		
2021	Myja Gary	Virginia	Crowned August 8, 2021, in Washington, D.C.
2022	Tahira Gilyard	New York	Crowned August 7, 2022, in Washington, D.C.
2023	Ariel Thompson	Kentucky	Crowned August 6, 2023 in Washington, D.C. Resigned in April 2024.
2024	Kennedy Lucas	Maryland	Crowned August 4, 2024 in Washington, D.C.
2025	Naiylah Archer	New Jersey	Crowned August 3, 2025 in Washington, D.C.
2026	Harmony Edosomwan	Vermont	Crowned August 9, 2026 in Washington, D.C.

=== Local and State winners ===
Miss Black USA state and local delegate winners and contestants have gone on to successful careers in entertainment, law, education, medicine and other arenas. Some of the state and local pageant's winners include:

- Rev. Deidra Avery, MDiv. (Miss Black Ohio 1993) – Minister.
- Kia Talein Anderson (Miss Black Maryland 1992 Miss Black USA First Runner-up 1993) – Award-Winning R&B/Gospel Recording artist, radio and TV Personality, actress and model.
- Dr. Lynette Danley-Land (Miss Black Iowa USA 1995) – College professor, author and speaker.
- Valorie Burton (Former Miss Black Texas USA 1995) – Former co-host of Bishop TD Jake's Potter House, life coach and author.
- Kemba Cofield (Miss Black Kentucky USA 1996) – Jazz recording artist
- Arnecia (Bradley) Williams (Miss Black Alabama USA 2007) – US Army Engineer, Actress, and Motivational Speaker
- Chloe Johnson (Miss Black Colorado USA 2011) – Television personality, model and dancer.
- Kade Henderson (Miss Black New York USA 2015, Community Ambassador Award Recipient) Brand and Wardrobe Stylist and Digital Merchant
- Ashley Jones (Miss Black Michigan USA 2015, Top 15 Miss Black USA 2015 national pageant and Community Ambassador Award Recipient) actress, model, brand ambassador, host www.theashleymarie.com
- Melba M. Furlow (Miss Black Florida USA 1996) – Former Christian Radio Talk show host, author, college professor, & former student of Iyanla Vanzanthttp://www.floridafamilynetwork.com/melba-furlow-herringtonhttp://www.jaxpubliclibrary.org/sites/default/files/Biography-Vertical-Files-List-Dec2014.pdf
- Daphne Marcelle Lee (Miss Black New Jersey USA 2017) Professional Ballerina, Activist, Model, Brown Girls Do Ballet, MFA Hollins University, BFA Ailey/Fordham University, www.daphnemlee.com
- Yasha Clark (Miss Black Louisiana USA 2019) Personal Injury Attorney, Model, Author www.justcallyasha.com
- Justine Baker (Miss Black Washington USA 2024) – Journalist, Television Personality, Author
- Jillian Patricia Pirtle (Miss Black Pennsylvania USA 2011) – soprano, historian, and CEO of the Marian Anderson Museum and Historical Society
- Myya Jones (Miss Black Michigan USA 2023) – international philanthropist, politician, and founder of Do Good Detroit and Do Good Nigeria
- Elizabeth Ann James (Miss Black Michigan USA 2024) – Breast Cancer Researcher, philanthropist, influencer, and model
