= Sandor Salgo =

Hungarian composer, conductor, and violist

Sandor Salgo

Sandor Salgo (Hungarian: Salgó Sándor; Budapest, 10 March 1909 – Palo Alto, California, 2007) was a Hungarian-born Jewish composer, conductor, and violist who emigrated to America in 1937.

Born into a Jewish family in Budapest in 1909, Sandor Salgo studied music in Budapest. A clear standout, his early career was affected by the prewar antisemitism then prevalent in Hungary. In 1937, Sandor Salgo and a string quartet would serenade the bed-ridden wife of the American Ambassador to Hungary. America's walls were closed to immigrants, but the Ambassador refused to leave Mr. Salgo behind and he was afforded a special visa to America in 1937.

While Salgo returned to Europe later in his life, he refused ever to visit Hungary or even speak Hungarian, because of the repressive government during his youth, the antisemitism, and in the Nazi years, the holocaust. In 1939 (with no formal training in English) Sandor Salgo taught at the Westminster Choir College in Princeton, New Jersey. It was during this time at Princeton that Albert Einstein attended one of Mr. Salgo's concerts. He sent him a letter of appreciation saying, "Mr. Sandor Salgo is a musician of high standing. The concert he gave ... has made a deep impression on me," the two played occasionally in a quartet together. Sandor Salgo was asked to conduct the Israeli symphony but politely declined saying, "I came here to be an American." From 1949 to 1973 Sandor Salgo taught and conducted the music and opera programs at Stanford University. Sandor and Priscilla Salgo began directing the Carmel Bach festival in 1956 and turned it into an internationally acclaimed festival. When he was in his nineties, Mr. Salgo wrote the book Thomas Jefferson: Musician and Violinist about the musical life of Thomas Jefferson.

Salgo was the conductor and Music Director of the Marin Symphony Orchestra for 33 years (1956–1989), the Carmel Bach Festival for 35 years (1956–1991), the San Jose Symphony for 19 years (1951–1970), and the Modesto Symphony for nine years (1951–1970). He was known for his gracious, quiet humor, his impeccable preparation and scholarship, and for his profound musical insights and interpretations.
