= Tindley Temple United Methodist Church =

Historic church in Pennsylvania, United States

- U.S. National Register of Historic Places
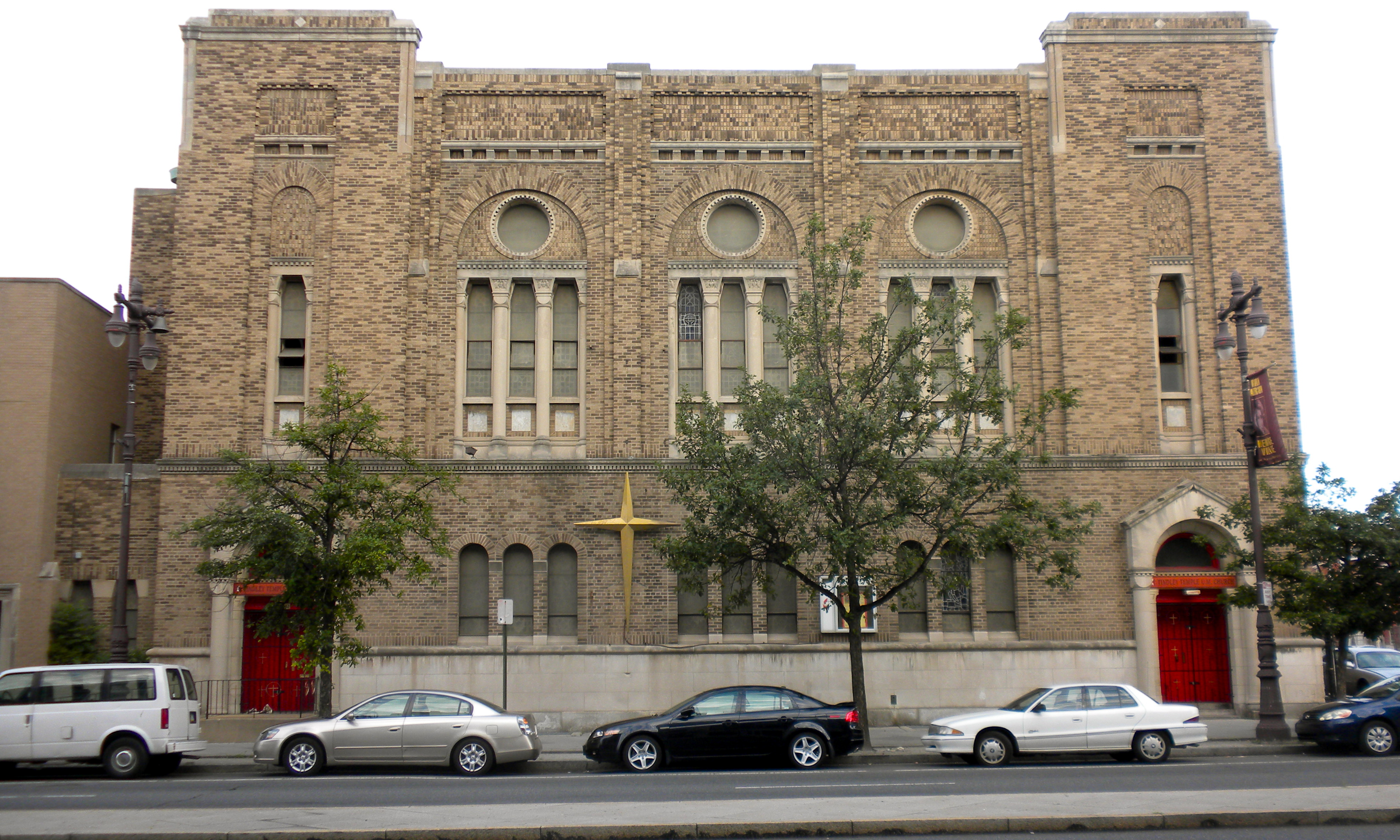
- Tindley Temple United Methodist Church, August 2011

- Location within Philadelphia Location within Pennsylvania Location within the United States
- Location: 756 South Broad Street, Philadelphia, Pennsylvania, U.S.
- Coordinates: 39°56′29″N 75°09′59″W
- Area: less than one acre
- Architect: Ballinger & Co.; Fink, A. Hensel
- Architectural style: Beaux-Arts Romanesque, Art Deco
- NRHP reference No.: 11000199
- Added to NRHP: April 15, 2011

Tindley Temple United Methodist Church, also known as Tindley Temple Methodist Episcopal Church and Calvary United Methodist Church, is a historic Methodist Episcopal church located in the Southwest Center City neighborhood of Philadelphia, Pennsylvania. It was built between 1923 and 1928, and is a large masonry building influenced by the Beaux-Arts Romanesque and Art Deco styles.

== History and architectural features ==
This historic church was named for its founder, the Rev. Dr. Charles Albert Tindley (1851–1933). The building's front façade features patterned tan brick and rounded arched grouped windows. A school and office addition were erected between 1962 and 1963. The sanctuary was built to accommodate 3,200 worshipers and features a large, reinforced concrete balcony and organ built by M. P. Moller.

=== National Register of Historic Places ===
The nomination materials for placement of the Tindley Temple United Methodist Church on the National Register of Historic Places were reviewed by Pennsylvania's Historic Preservation Board on February 1, 2011 at 9:45 a.m. at the Labor and Industry Building in Harrisburg, Pennsylvania. Also considered for National Register placement at this meeting were: the Robb Farm in Huntingdon County, the McCook Family Estate and the John A. Brashear House and Factory in Pittsburgh, the Montrose Historic District in Susquehanna County, the Quakertown Historic District in Bucks County, Wilpen Hall in Sewickley, Alden Villa in Lebanon County, and the Marian Anderson House in Philadelphia, as well as multiple historic African American churches in Philadelphia that were presented together on a "Multiple Property Documentation Form."

This historic church was then officially added to the National Register of Historic Places later in 2011.
