= Chloe Johnson =

American television personality

Chloe Johnson (born May 24, 1989) is an American television personality, beauty pageant title holder, model, dancer and community leader.

== Undercover Boss ==
Chloe Johnson is best known for her appearance on season two of the critically acclaimed CBS reality television series Undercover Boss starring DirecTV CEO Mike White. White was so inspired by Johnson's positive attitude and work ethic that he created a DirecTV scholarship program in her name worth $10,000 which included her as the first recipient. Also, White acknowledged Johnson's "talent" and "amazing future ahead", and in consideration that she grew up without her father, offered her his personal mentorship including several yearly meetings together.

== Miss Black Colorado, USA 2011 ==
Johnson is also known as an American beauty pageant title holder from Aurora, Colorado who won the title of Miss Black Colorado USA, 2011. Johnson will be competing in the Miss Black USA Pageant in 2012.

== Education ==
Johnson graduated from Rangeview High School in 2007, and is currently studying political science at The University of Colorado Denver and is scheduled to graduate in the Spring or Summer of 2011.
