= Carmel Bach Festival =

Annual music series in Carmel-by-the-Sea, California

- Status: Active
- Genre: Festivals
- Begins: July 12, 2025
- Ends: July 26, 2025
- Frequency: Annually
- Venue: Sunset Center, Carmel Mission Basilica, All Saints' Episcopal Church, Church in the Forest, and more
- Locations: Carmel-by-the-Sea, California, US
- Coordinates: 36.5517°N 121.9216°W
- Inaugurated: 1935
- Founder: Dene Denny and Hazel Watrous
- Leader: Grete Pedersen, Artistic Director and Principal Conductor
- Website: bachfestival.org

The Carmel Bach Festival is a classical music concert series held annually in Carmel-by-the-Sea, California.

== History ==
In 1927, Henry F. Dickinson and his wife Edith played a pivotal role in the formation of the Carmel Music Society. Henry became the organization's first treasurer and Edith served as one of its first presidents. Visiting musicians were hosted at the Henry Dickinson House, situated on Carmel Point.

In 1935, the Carmel Music Society co-sponsored the establishment of the Carmel Bach Festival. The Carmel Bach Festival began as a three- and later four-day festival of open rehearsals, events, and concerts conducted by Ernst Bacon and Gastone Usigli.

In 1938, Gastone Usigli was named music director, leading the festival until his death in 1956. As his successor Dene Denny chose Hungarian-born conductor Sandor Salgo.

When Salgo retired in 1991, Bruno Weil was named the music director and conductor of the Carmel Bach Festival. Maestro Weil concluded his tenure with the 2010 festival.

In 2020, the festival cancelled its season as a result of the COVID-19 pandemic. It was also cancelled from 1942 to 1945 due to World War II.

In 2023, the Carmel Bach announced the appointment of Grete Pedersen as artistic director and principal conductor. Pedersen is the first woman to assume this position, and only the sixth artistic director in the festival's history.
