= Dene Denny =

Founder of the Carmel Bach Festival

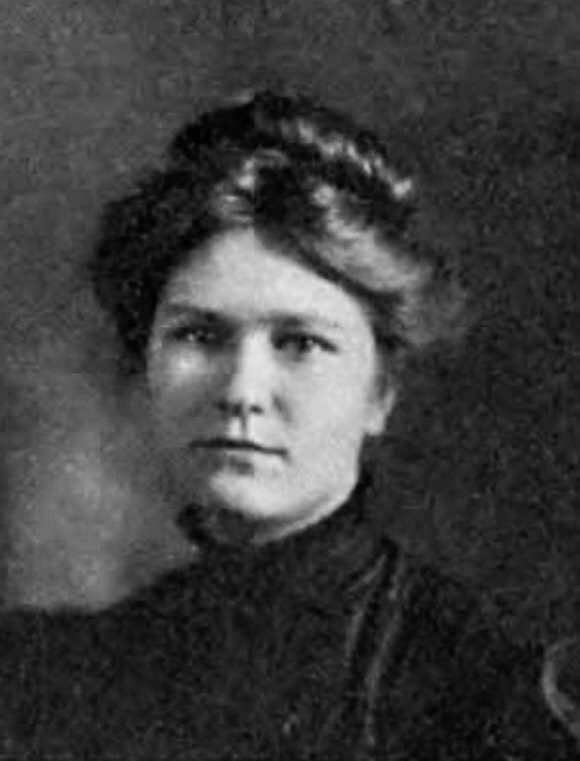
- Denny at University of California Berkeley (1907)
- Born: Ethel Adele Denny; February 11, 1885; Callahan, California, US
- Died: September 24, 1959 (aged 74); Carmel-by-the-Sea, California, US
- Occupations: Pianist, teacher
- Notable work: Denny-Watrous Studio (Harmony House); Ann Nash-Dorthy Bassett House (1921)
- Partner: Hazel Watrous

Dene Denny (February 11, 1885 – September 24, 1959) was an American musical theater producer who, along with co-founder Hazel Watrous, established the Denny-Watrous Management. They played pivotal roles in the founding of the Carmel Music Society, the Carmel Bach Festival, and Monterey's First Theater. Their residence, the Denny-Watrous Studio (Harmony House), served as a hub for hosting musical concerts and lectures.

== Early life and education ==
Ethel Adele Denny was born in 1885, in Callahan, California. Her parents were Albert H. Denny and Gertrude Cadwell.

Denny attended the University of California, Berkeley, where she received a BA and MA degree. She went to New York to take formal piano studies. Denny then established a music studio in San Francisco, where she taught piano.

== Career ==
In 1922, Denny and Watrous met in San Francisco and quickly became a couple.

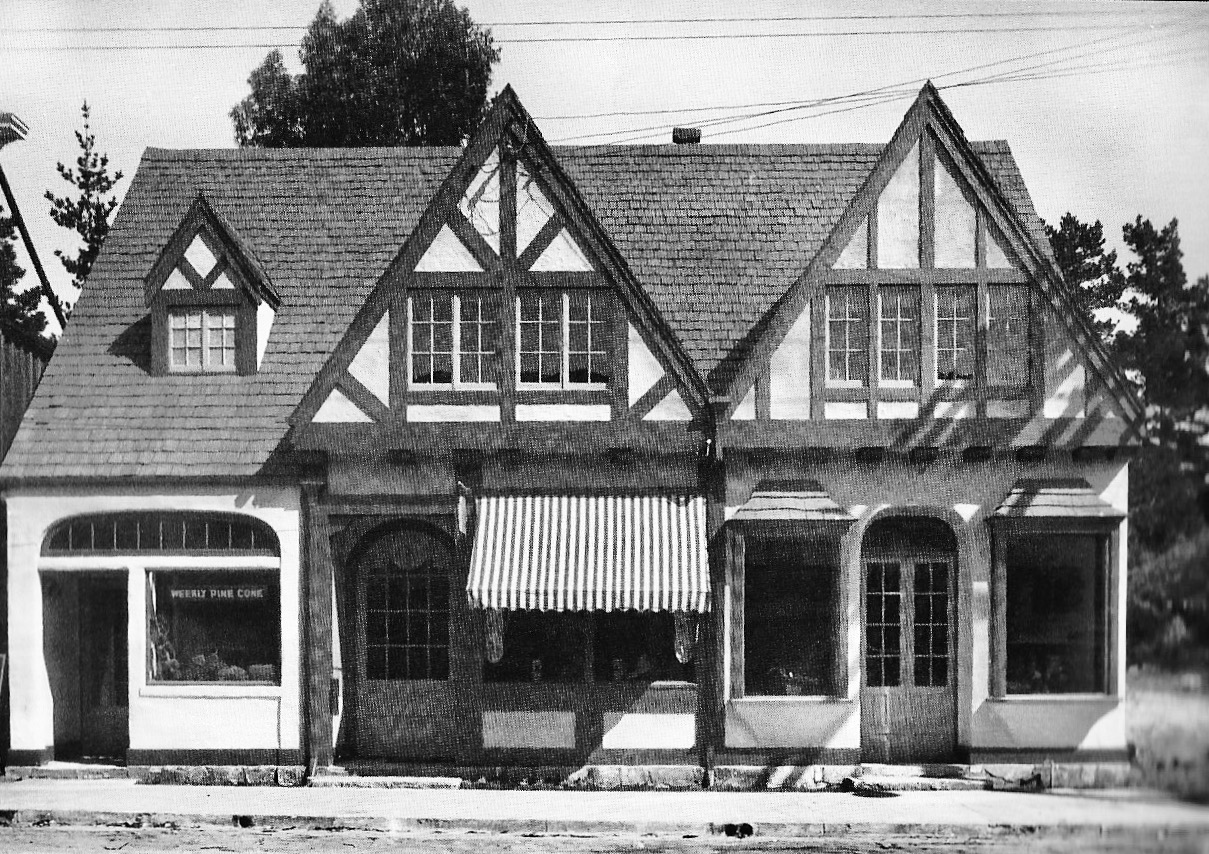
The Denny-Watrous gallery was located at the De Yoe Building.

In 1928, the couple secured a lease for the Theatre of the Golden Bough from Edward Kuster, and in 1937 leased California's First Theater in Monterey.

== Death ==
Denny died at her home in Carmel, California on September 24, 1959.

== See also ==
- List of Historic Buildings in Carmel-by-the-Sea
