= Hazel Watrous =

Founder of the Carmel Bach Festival

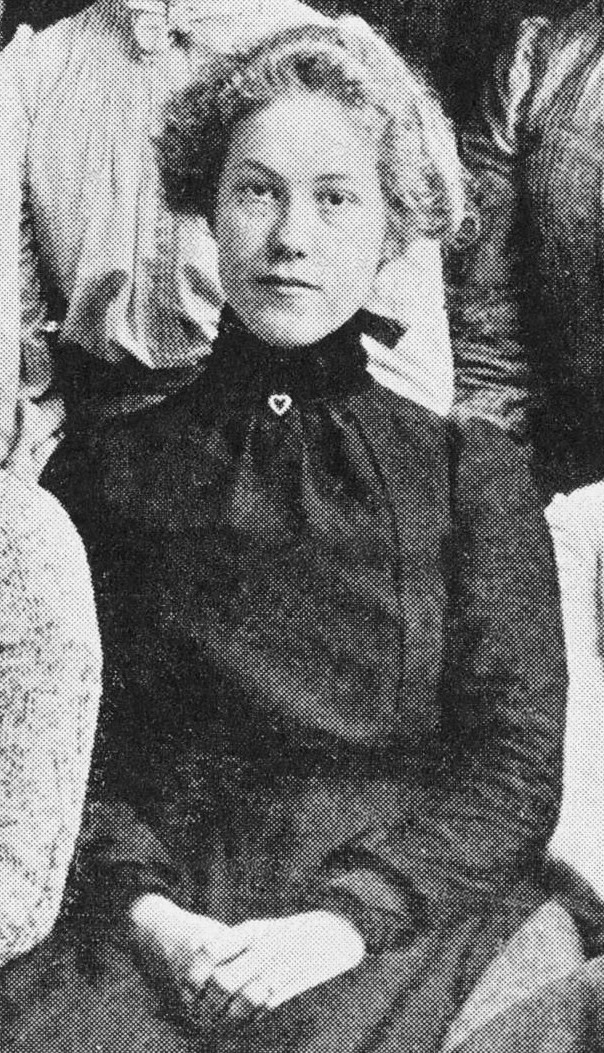
- Watrous at San Jose Normal School
- Born: February 12, 1888; Visalia, California, US
- Died: October 2, 1954 (aged 66); San Jose, California, US
- Occupation(s): Painter, stage designer, architect and interior decorator

Hazel Watrous (February 12, 1888 – October 2, 1954) was an American writer who was co-founder of Denny-Watrous Management. The company presented performances in Carmel-by-the-Sea, California. She and Dene Denny played roles in founding the Carmel Music Society, the Carmel Bach Festival, and Monterey's First Theater. They hosted musical concerts and lectures from their home. In addition, they established the Denny-Watrous Gallery.

== Early life ==
Watrous was born on February 12, 1888, in Visalia, California. Her father was Stephen Watrous, a professional landscape photographer who settled in San Francisco in 1852. Watrous completed her art major at San Jose State College.

== Career ==
Watrous spent numerous years working for the Fisher Studio in Los Angeles, California, where she served as a theater critic for their productions and roadshow vaudeville acts. Additionally, she designed costumes and sets for the Moroni Olson Players in Los Angeles.

In 1922, Watrous met Dene Denny in San Francisco and they quickly became a couple. To generate income, they designed residential houses, completing a total of 36 homes.

In 1928, they launched Denny-Watrous Management and secured a lease for the Theatre of the Golden Bough, and in 1937 leased California's First Theater.

Watrous served on the Carmel City Council from 1938 to 1940.

== Death ==
Watrous died on October 2, 1954, in San Jose, California.

== See also ==
- List of Historic Buildings in Carmel-by-the-Sea
