= Blanche Burton-Lyles =

American pianist, music educator, and historian

- Born: Blanche Henrietta Burton; March 2, 1933; Philadelphia, Pennsylvania, U.S.
- Died: November 20, 2018 (aged 85)
- Education: Curtis Institute of Music; Temple University
- Occupation(s): pianist music teacher historian
- Spouse: Thurman Lyles
- Children: 1

Blanche Henrietta Burton-Lyles (March 2, 1933 – November 20, 2018) was an American pianist, music educator, and historian. She was the protégé of the opera singer Marian Anderson, and went on to establish the Marian Anderson Museum and Historical Society.

== Early life and education ==
Burton-Lyles was born on March 2, 1933, in Philadelphia to Anthony Burton and Anna Blanche Taylor Burton. Her father worked for the United States Postal Service and sang in the choir at Union Baptist Church, where Burton-Lyles late met opera singer Marian Anderson. Her mother was a piano teacher and accompanist at the church.

Considered a child prodigy, she was admitted to the Curtis Institute of Music in 1944, at the age of eleven, where she studied with Isabelle Vengerova. That same year, she played with the Philadelphia Concert Orchestra, the first African-American symphony orchestra, at Scottish Rite Temple.

In November 1947, after winning the Young Audiences Competition, she became the first African-American woman to perform at Carnegie Hall with the New York Philharmonic, conducted by Rudolph Ganz.

Burton-Lyles graduated from the Curtis Institute of Music in 1954, becoming the school's first African-American graduate with a degree in piano. In 1971, she earned a bachelor's degree in music education from Temple University.

== Career ==
After completing her studies at the Curtis Institute, Burton-Lyles began a career in music with a performance with the New Haven Symphony at Yale University. This was followed by recitals in the United Kingdom, Spain, and the United States throughout the 1950s and 1960s. During this period, she also accompanied the Leroy Bostic and the Mellow Aires ensemble.

In the early 1960s, Burton-Lyles began working as a school teacher under the Philadelphia Board of Education. She retired from teaching in 1993 and founded the Marian Anderson Historical Society, where she served as president and chief executive officer. She acquired Anderson's residence in 1998 and birthplace in 2000.

=== Awards ===
Burton-Lyles received many awards throughout her career, including the Shirley Chisholm Philadelphia Political Congress of Black Women Award for Achievement in Music in 1994 and the National Black Music Caucus Award for Outstanding Women in Music in 1995. She received the Mary McLeod Bethune Award from the National Council of Negro Women in 2000, the Philadelphia 76ers's Community Service All-Star Award in 2004, and the Sadie T. Alexander Award from Delta Sigma Theta in 2005. In 2006 she received the Edythe Ingram Award from Alpha Kappa Alpha and, in 2007, she received the Martin Luther King Jr. Drum Major Cultural Award and the National Association of Negro Business and Professional Women's Unsung Hero Award.

== Personal life ==
She married Thurman Lyles in 1956. They had one son, Thedric.

Burton-Lyles died of heart failure on November 20, 2018.
