= Marian Anderson House =

Historic house in Pennsylvania, United States

- U.S. National Register of Historic Places
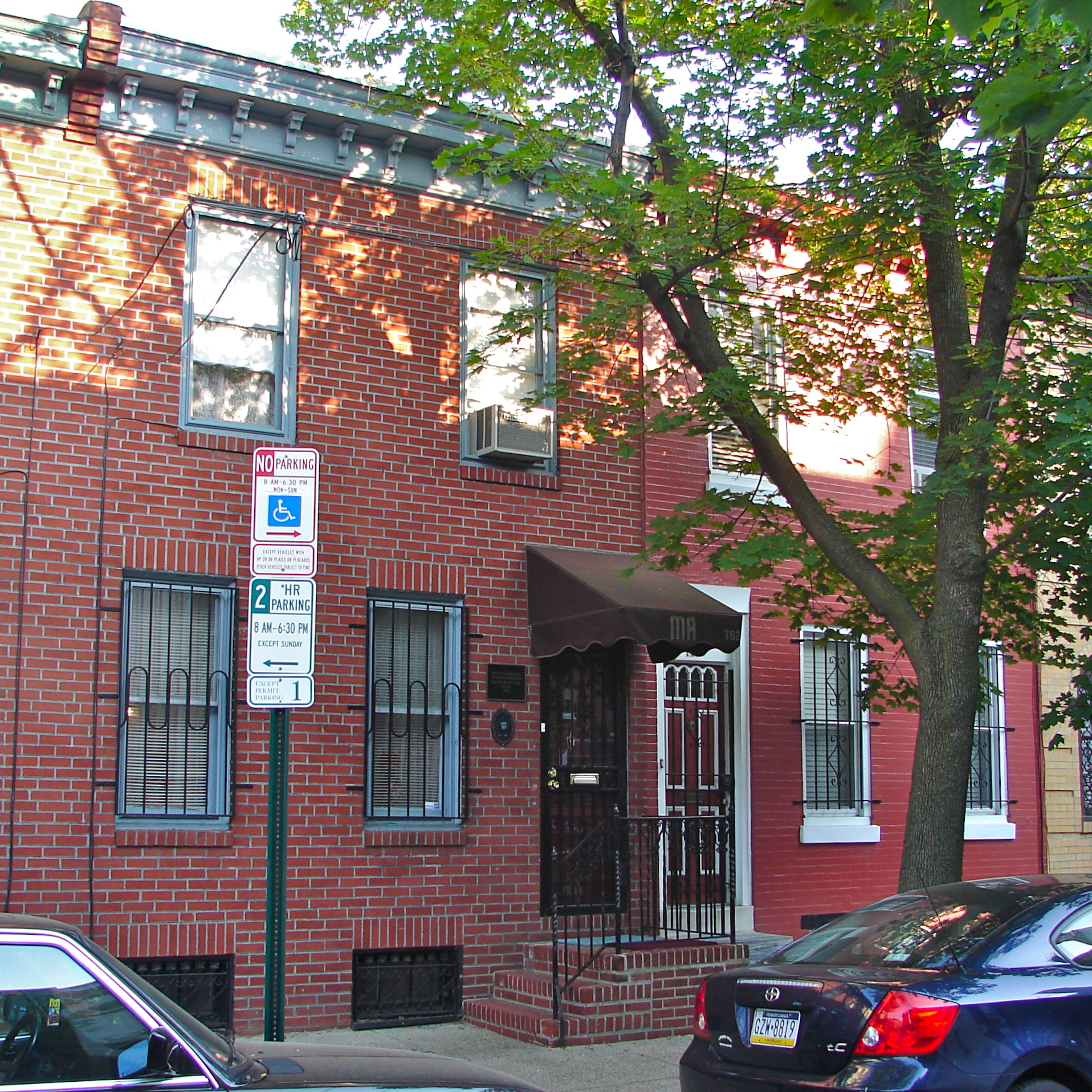
- Marian Anderson House, June 2011

- Location within Philadelphia Location within Pennsylvania Location within the United States
- Location: 762 South Martin Street, Philadelphia, Pennsylvania
- Coordinates: 39°56′32″N 75°10′29″W
- Area: less than one acre
- Built: c. 1870, c. 1925, c. 1940
- Architectural style: Italianate
- NRHP reference No.: 11000198
- Added to NRHP: April 14, 2011

The Marian Anderson House is a historic home located in the Southwest Center City neighborhood of Philadelphia, Pennsylvania. Built circa 1870 in the same neighborhood where opera singer and civil rights activist Marian Anderson was born 27 years later, this two-story, brick rowhouse dwelling was designed in the Italianate style. Purchased by Anderson in 1924, the same year she became the first African-American concert artist to record spirituals for a major American recording company, she continued to reside here until 1943. The house is currently home to the Marian Anderson Museum and Historical Society.

== History and architectural features ==
The Marian Anderson House was built circa 1870 as a two-story, brick terraced dwelling in the Italianate style. A studio was added above the previously one-story rear kitchen ell sometime around 1925. The home was then extensively renovated circa 1940. It served as Anderson's residence from 1924 to 1943.

This historic residence was added to the National Register of Historic Places in April 2011.

== Marian Anderson Museum and Historical Society ==
The property currently houses the Marian Anderson Museum and Historical Society. The organization was founded by Blanche Burton-Lyles. Its current CEO is Jillian Patricia Pirtle.

== Flood damage and restoration ==
In 2020, pipes burst in the home, causing significant damage to both the structure and Anderson's memorabilia.

In July 2021, the National Trust for Historic Preservation announced plans to grant the Marian Anderson Museum and Historical Society $75,000 to repair the home's exterior. The Marian Anderson Memorial Fund Task Force, a group that is working to erect a monument to Marian Anderson at the Academy of Music, has stated that it plans to use some of the funds raised to assist with additional repairs to the home.

In December 2022, the Daughters of the American Revolution donated $150,000 to the museum to help with restoration costs.

== See also ==
- Marian Anderson: The Lincoln Memorial Concert
- List of music museums
